= List of battery electric vehicles =

Battery powered cars

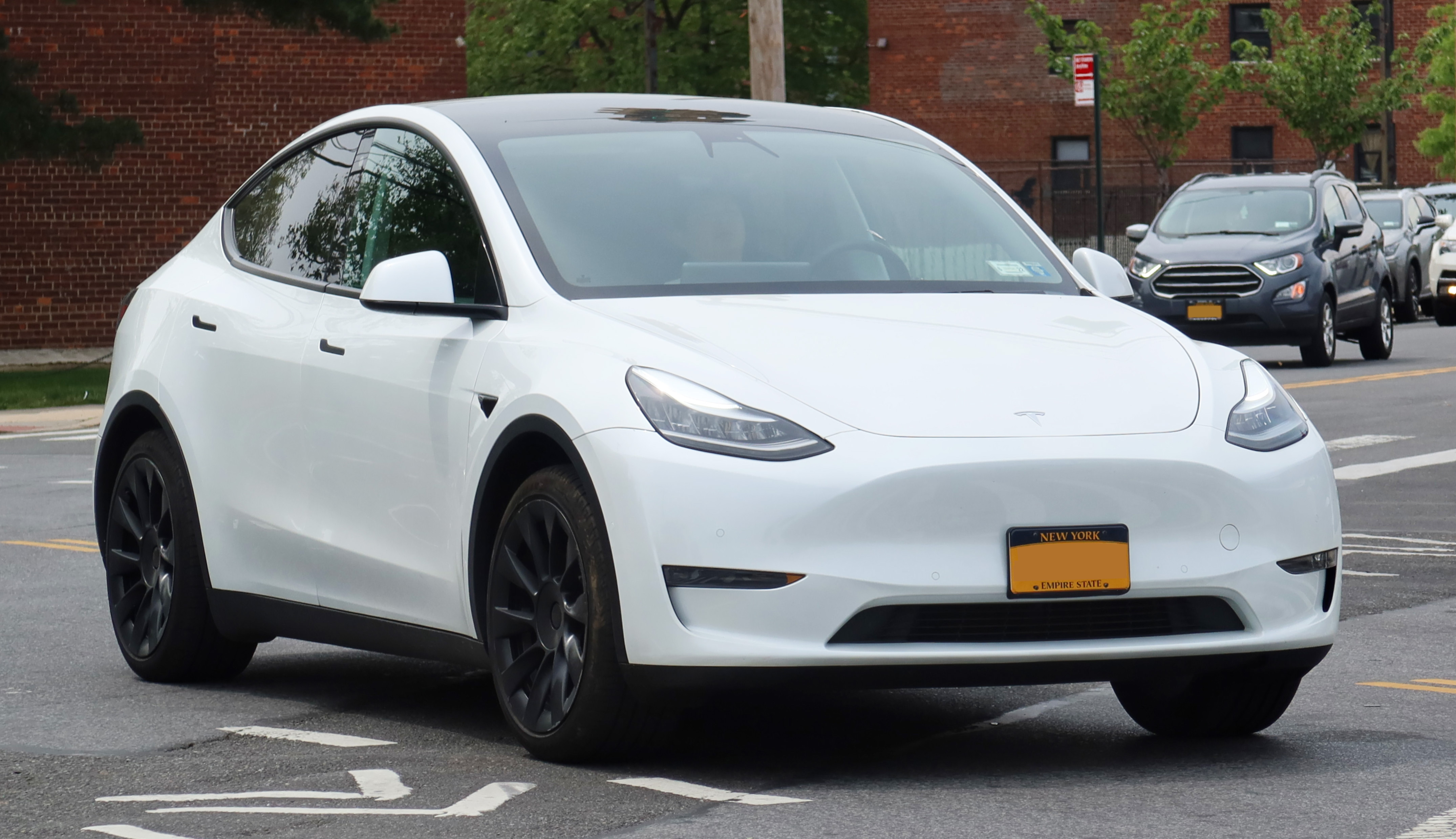
The Tesla Model Y is the first electric vehicle to become the world's best-selling car in 2023, outselling the Toyota Corolla.

Battery electric vehicles are vehicles exclusively using chemical energy stored in rechargeable battery packs, with no secondary source of propulsion (e.g., hydrogen fuel cell, internal combustion engine, etc.). The following list includes mass-produced vehicles, formerly produced vehicles, and planned vehicles.

== Production models ==
=== Highway-capable automobiles ===
Highway-capable battery electric automobiles capable of 100 km/h (62 mph) highway speed:

==== Global market ====
Production highway-capable battery electric automobiles originating outside the Chinese market, both dedicated battery electric vehicles (without an ICE-powered counterpart sharing the same body) or non-dedicated battery electric vehicles (based on an ICE-powered vehicle):

Model	Calendar year produced	Body style	Platform	Dedicated battery electric vehicle? (Note: Indicates whether the vehicle is a dedicated battery electric vehicle without any non-battery electric counterpart sharing the same underpinnings or body)	Manufacturer	Marque origin			
Abarth 500e	2023	Hatchback		No	Stellantis	Italy			
Abarth 600e	2024	Crossover SUV	eCMP, CMP	No	Stellantis	Italy			
Aletra L8	2025	MPV/minivan		Yes	Aletra (produced by Geely)	Indonesia			
Alfa Romeo Junior	2024	Crossover SUV	eCMP, CMP	No	Stellantis	Italy			
Alpine A290	2024	Hatchback	AmpR Small	Yes	Alpine/Renault	France			
Alpine A390	2026	Crossover SUV	AmpR Medium	Yes	Alpine/Renault	France			
Audi e-tron GT	2021	Sedan	J1	Yes	Audi	Germany			
Audi A6 e-tron	2024	Sedan and Station wagon	PPE	Yes	Audi	Germany			
Audi Q4 e-tron	2021	Crossover SUV	MEB	Yes	Audi	Germany			
Audi Q6 e-tron	2024	Crossover SUV	PPE	Yes	Audi	Germany			
BMW i3	2026	Sedan	Neue Klasse	Yes	BMW	Germany			
BMW i4	2021	Liftback	CLAR	No	BMW	Germany			
BMW i5	2023	Sedan	CLAR	No	BMW	Germany			
BMW i5 Touring	2024	Station wagon	CLAR	No	BMW	Germany			
BMW i7	2022	Sedan	CLAR	No	BMW	Germany			
BMW iX	2021	Crossover SUV	iX	Yes	BMW	Germany			
BMW iX1	2022	Crossover SUV	UKL2	No	BMW	Germany			
BMW iX2	2023	Crossover SUV	UKL2	No	BMW	Germany			
BMW iX3	2025	Crossover SUV	Neue Klasse	Yes	BMW	Germany			
Cadillac Celestiq	2024	Liftback	BEV3	Yes	General Motors	United States			
Cadillac Escalade IQ	2024	SUV	BT1	Yes	General Motors	United States			
Cadillac Lyriq	2022	Crossover SUV	BEV3	Yes	General Motors	United States			
Cadillac Optiq	2023	Crossover SUV	BEV3	Yes	General Motors	United States			
Cadillac Vistiq	2025	Crossover SUV	BEV3	Yes	General Motors	United States			
Chevrolet Blazer EV	2023	Crossover SUV	BEV3	Yes	General Motors	United States			
Chevrolet Bolt	2025	Crossover SUV	BEV2	Yes	General Motors	United States			
Chevrolet Captiva EV	2025	Crossover SUV	Tianyu D	No	General Motors (produced by SAIC-GM-Wuling)	United States			
Chevrolet Equinox EV	2024	Crossover SUV	BEV3	Yes	General Motors	United States			
Chevrolet Express Max EV	2025	Van		No	General Motors (produced by SAIC Motor)	United States			
Chevrolet Silverado EV	2023	Pickup truck	BT1	Yes	General Motors	United States			
Chevrolet Spark EUV	2025	Mini SUV	Tianyu M	Yes	General Motors (produced by SAIC-GM-Wuling)	United States			
Chevrolet Spark EV	2022	Microcar hatchback	GSEV	Yes	General Motors (produced by SAIC-GM-Wuling)	United States			
CMC E300	2018	Van and Truck		No	CMC	Taiwan			
CMC ET35	2025	Truck		Yes	CMC	Taiwan			
Citroën e-Berlingo	2021	Van	EMP2	No	Stellantis	France			
Citroën ë-C3 (Europe)	2023	Hatchback	Smart Car	No	Stellantis	France			
Citroën ë-C3 (India)	2023	Hatchback	Smart Car	No	Stellantis	France			
Citroën ë-C3 Aircross (Europe)	2024	Crossover SUV	Smart Car	No	Stellantis	France			
Citroën ë-C4	2021	Crossover SUV	eCMP	No	Stellantis	France			
Citroën ë-C4 X	2022	Crossover SUV	eCMP	No	Stellantis	France			
Citroën ë-C5 Aircross	2025	Crossover SUV	STLA Medium	No	Stellantis	France			
Citroën ë-Jumper/Relay	2021	Van		No	Stellantis	France			
Citroën ë-Jumpy/Dispatch/SpaceTourer	2021	Van	EMP2	No	Stellantis	France			
Cupra Born	2021	Hatchback	MEB	Yes	SEAT	Spain			
Cupra Raval	2026	Hatchback	MEB Entry	Yes	SEAT	Spain			
Cupra Tavascan	2023	Crossover SUV	MEB	Yes	SEAT	Spain			
Daihatsu e-Hijet Cargo/e-Atrai	2026	Van/microvan	DNGA	No	Toyota	Japan			
DS 3 Crossback E-Tense	2019	Crossover SUV	eCMP	No	Stellantis	France			
DS No. 4	2025	Hatchback	EMP2 V3	No	Stellantis	France			
DS No. 8	2025	Crossover SUV	STLA Medium	Yes	Stellantis	France			
Dodge Charger Daytona	2024	Liftback	STLA Large	No	Stellantis	United States			
Dacia Spring	2021	Hatchback	CMFA-EV	No	Dacia/Renault	Romania			
Faraday Future FF 91	2023	Crossover SUV		Yes	Faraday Future	United States			
Ferrari Luce	2026	Liftback		Yes	Ferrari	Italy			
Fiat E-Doblò	2022	Van		No	Stellantis	Italy			
Fiat E-Ducato	2021	Van	Van	No	Stellantis	Italy	No	Stellantis	Italy
Fiat E-Scudo	2022	EMP2	Van	No	Stellantis	Italy	No	Stellantis	Italy
Fiat E-Ulysse	2022	MPV/minivan	EMP2		Stellantis	Italy	No	Stellantis	Italy
Fiat 500e	2020	Hatchback		Yes	Stellantis	Italy		Stellantis	Italy
Fiat 600e	2023	Crossover SUV	eCMP, CMP	No	Stellantis	Italy		Stellantis	Italy
Fiat Grande Panda	2024	Hatchback	Smart Car	No				Stellantis	Italy
Ford Capri EV	2024	Crossover SUV	MEB	Yes	Ford	United States			
Ford E-Tourneo Custom	2023	MPV/minivan	Ford Pro	No	Ford	United States			
Ford E-Transit	2021	Van		No	Ford	United States			
Ford E-Transit Courier	2023	Van	Ford Global B-car	No	Ford	United States			
Ford E-Transit Custom	2023	Van	Ford Pro	No	Ford	United States			
Ford Explorer EV	2024	Crossover SUV	MEB	Yes	Ford	United States			
Ford Mustang Mach-E	2020	Crossover SUV	GE1	Yes	Ford	United States			
Ford Puma Gen-E	2024	Crossover SUV	Ford Global B-car	No	Ford	United States			
Ford Transit City	2026	Van		Yes	Ford (produced by JMC)	United States			
Foxtron Bria	2025	Crossover SUV	Foxtron MIH	Yes	Foxtron	Taiwan			
Foxtron Cavira	2026	Crossover SUV	Foxtron MIH	Yes	Foxtron	Taiwan			
Genesis Electrified G80	2021	Sedan	M3	No	Genesis Motor	South Korea			
Genesis Electrified GV70	2022	Crossover SUV	M3	No	Genesis Motor	South Korea			
Genesis GV60	2021	Crossover SUV	E-GMP	Yes	Genesis Motor	South Korea			
GMC Sierra EV	2023	Pickup truck	BT1	Yes	General Motors	United States			
GMC Hummer EV	2022	Pickup truck and SUV	BT1	Yes	General Motors	United States			
Honda e:Ny1/e:N1	2023	Crossover SUV	e:N Architecture F	No	Honda	Japan			
Honda e:N2/Insight	2026	Crossover SUV	e:N Architecture F	No	Honda	Japan			
Honda N-One e:	2025	Hatchback		No	Honda	Japan			
Honda N-Van e:	2024	Microvan		No	Honda	Japan			
Honda Prologue	2023	Crossover SUV	BEV3	Yes	Honda (produced by General Motors)	Japan			
Honda Super-One/Super-N	2026	Hatchback		No	Honda	Japan			
Hyundai Casper Electric/Inster	2024	Hatchback	Hyundai-Kia K1 BEV	No	Hyundai	South Korea			
Hyundai Creta Electric	2025	Crossover SUV	Hyundai-Kia K2 BEV	No	Hyundai	South Korea			
Hyundai Elexio	2025	Crossover SUV	E-GMP	Yes	Hyundai	South Korea			
Hyundai Ioniq 3	2026	Hatchback	E-GMP	Yes	Hyundai	South Korea			
Hyundai Ioniq 5	2021	Crossover SUV	E-GMP	Yes	Hyundai	South Korea			
Hyundai Ioniq 6	2022	Sedan	E-GMP	Yes	Hyundai	South Korea			
Hyundai Ioniq 9	2025	Crossover SUV	E-GMP	Yes	Hyundai	South Korea			
Hyundai Kona Electric	2019	Crossover SUV	Hyundai-Kia K3	No	Hyundai	South Korea			
Hyundai Neira	2026	MPV/minivan	Hyundai-Kia K2 BEV	No	Hyundai	South Korea			
Hyundai Porter2 Electric	2019	Pickup truck		No	Hyundai	South Korea			
Hyundai Staria Electric	2026	MPV/minivan	Hyundai-Kia N3	No	Hyundai	South Korea			
Hyundai ST1	2024	Pickup truck / cab chassis	Hyundai-Kia N3						
Isuzu D-Max EV	2025	Pickup truck		No	Isuzu	Japan			
Iveco eJolly	2025	Van	EMP2	No	Iveco (produced by Stellantis)	Italy			
Iveco eMoovy	2024	Pickup truck / cab chassis	Hyundai-Kia N3	No	Iveco (produced by Hyundai)	Italy			
Iveco eSuperJolly	2025	Van		No	Iveco (produced by Stellantis)	Italy			
Jeep Avenger	2023	Crossover SUV	eCMP / STLA Small	No	Stellantis	United States			
Jeep Recon	2026	SUV	STLA Large	Yes	Stellantis	United States			
Jeep Wagoneer S	2024	Crossover SUV	STLA Large	Yes	Stellantis	United States			
KGM Korando e-Motion	2022	Crossover SUV		No	KG Mobility	South Korea			
KGM Musso EV	2025	Pickup truck		Yes	KG Mobility	South Korea			
KGM Torres EVX	2023	Crossover SUV		No	KG Mobility	South Korea			
Kia Bongo EV	2020	Pickup truck		No	Kia	South Korea			
Kia Carens Clavis EV	2025	MPV/minivan	Hyundai-Kia K2 BEV	No	Kia	South Korea			
Kia EV2	2026	Crossover SUV	E-GMP	Yes	Kia	South Korea			
Kia EV3	2024	Crossover SUV	E-GMP	Yes	Kia	South Korea			
Kia EV4	2025	Sedan and hatchback	E-GMP	Yes	Kia	South Korea			
Kia EV5	2023	Crossover SUV	Hyundai-Kia N3 eK	Yes	Kia	South Korea			
Kia EV6	2021	Crossover SUV	E-GMP	Yes	Kia	South Korea			
Kia EV9	2023	Crossover SUV	E-GMP	Yes	Kia	South Korea			
Kia PV5 Cargo	2025	Van	E-GMP.S	Yes	Kia	South Korea			
Kia PV5 Passenger	2025	MPV/minivan	E-GMP.S	Yes	Kia	South Korea			
Kia Ray EV	2012	MPV/minivan		No	Kia	South Korea			
Lancia Ypsilon	2024	Hatchback	eCMP	No	Stellantis	Italy			
Lexus ES 350e/500e	2025	Sedan	TNGA: GA-K	No	Toyota	Japan			
Lexus RZ	2022	Crossover SUV	e-TNGA	Yes	Toyota	Japan			
Lotus Eletre	2023	Crossover SUV	EPA	Yes	Lotus Cars	United Kingdom			
Lotus Emeya	2024	Liftback	EPA	Yes	Lotus Cars	United Kingdom			
Lucid Air	2021	Sedan		Yes	Lucid Motors	United States			
Lucid Gravity	2024	Crossover SUV		Yes	Lucid Motors	United States			
Luxgen n7	2024	Crossover SUV	Foxtron MIH	Yes	Yulon Motors	Taiwan			
Mahindra BE 6	2025	Crossover SUV	INGLO	Yes	Mahindra	India			
Mahindra XEV 9e	2025	Crossover SUV	INGLO	Yes	Mahindra	India			
Mahindra XEV 9S	2025	Crossover SUV	INGLO	Yes	Mahindra	India			
Mahindra XUV 3XO EV	2026	Crossover SUV	X100	No	Mahindra	India			
Maserati Grecale Folgore	2023	Crossover SUV	FCA Giorgio	No	Stellantis	Italy			
Maserati GranTurismo Folgore	2023	Coupé	Giorgio Sport	No	Stellantis	Italy			
Maserati GranCabrio Folgore	2024	Convertible	Giorgio Sport	No	Stellantis	Italy			
Mazda 6e	2025	Liftback	EPA1	Yes	Mazda	Japan			
Mazda CX-6e	2026	Crossover SUV	EPA1	Yes	Mazda	Japan			
Mazda MX-30	2020	Crossover SUV	e-Skyactiv	No	Mazda	Japan			
Mercedes-Benz CLA Electric	2025	Sedan	MMA	No	Mercedes-Benz Group	Germany			
Mercedes-Benz C-Class Electric	2026	Sedan	MB.EA	Yes	Mercedes-Benz Group	Germany			
Mercedes-Benz EQE	2022	Sedan	EVA	Yes	Mercedes-Benz Group	Germany			
Mercedes-Benz EQE SUV	2022	Crossover SUV	EVA	Yes	Mercedes-Benz Group	Germany			
Mercedes-Benz EQS	2021	Liftback	MEA	Yes	Mercedes-Benz Group	Germany			
Mercedes-Benz EQS SUV	2022	Crossover SUV	MEA	Yes	Mercedes-Benz Group	Germany			
Mercedes-Benz EQV	2020	MPV/minivan		No	Mercedes-Benz Group	Germany			
Mercedes-Benz eVito	2020	MPV/minivan		No	Mercedes-Benz Group	Germany			
Mercedes-Benz eSprinter	2019	Van		No	Mercedes-Benz Group	Germany			
Mercedes-Benz GLA Electric	2026	Crossover SUV	MMA	No	Mercedes-Benz Group	Germany			
Mercedes-Benz GLB Electric	2026	Crossover SUV	MMA	No	Mercedes-Benz Group	Germany			
Mercedes-Benz GLC Electric	2026	Crossover SUV	MB.EA	Yes	Mercedes-Benz Group	Germany			
Mercedes-Benz G-Class with EQ technology	2024	SUV		No	Mercedes-Benz Group	Germany			
Mercedes-Benz VLE	2026	MPV/minivan	VAN.EA	Yes	Mercedes-Benz Group	Germany			
Mini Cooper E/SE	2023	Hatchback		No	Mini/BMW	United Kingdom			
Mini Countryman E/SE	2024	Crossover SUV	UKL2	No	Mini/BMW	United Kingdom			
Mini Aceman	2024	Crossover SUV		Yes	Mini/BMW	United Kingdom			
Mitsubishi eK X EV	2022	Hatchback	KEI-EV	No	NMKV	Japan			
Mitsubishi Eclipse Cross EV	2025	Crossover SUV	AmpR Medium	Yes	Mitsubishi Motors (produced by Renault)	Japan			
Mitsubishi Minicab EV	2011	Van		No	Mitsubishi Motors	Japan			
Moskvitch 3e	2022	Crossover SUV		No	Moskvitch	Russia			
MAN eTGE	2018	Van		No	MAN Truck & Bus	Germany			
Nissan Ariya	2021	Crossover SUV	AmpR Medium	Yes	Nissan	Japan			
Nissan Clipper EV	2024	Van		No	Nissan (produced by Mitsubishi Motors)	Japan			
Nissan Leaf	2010	Hatchback (2010–2025); Crossover SUV (2025–present)	AmpR Medium	Yes	Nissan	Japan			
Nissan Micra EV	2025	Hatchback	AmpR Small	Yes	Nissan (produced by Renault)	Japan			
Nissan Primera	2026	Sedan	Tianyan Architecture	No	Nissan	Japan			
Nissan Sakura	2022	Hatchback	KEI-EV	Yes	NMKV	Japan			
Nissan Townstar EV	2021	Van	CMF-CD	No	Nissan (produced by Renault)	Japan			
Opel/Vauxhall Astra Electric	2023	Hatchback	EMP2 V3	No	Stellantis	Germany/United Kingdom			
Opel/Vauxhall Astra Sports Tourer Electric	2023	Station wagon	EMP2 V3	No	Stellantis	Germany/United Kingdom			
Opel/Vauxhall Combo-e	2021	Van	EMP2	No	Stellantis	Germany/United Kingdom			
Opel/Vauxhall Corsa Electric	2019	Hatchback	eCMP	No	Stellantis	Germany/United Kingdom			
Opel/Vauxhall Mokka-e	2020	Crossover SUV	eCMP	No	Stellantis	Germany/United Kingdom			
Opel/Vauxhall Frontera Electric	2024	Crossover SUV	Smart Car	No	Stellantis	Germany/United Kingdom			
Opel/Vauxhall Grandland Electric	2024	Crossover SUV	STLA Medium	No	Stellantis	Germany/United Kingdom			
Opel/Vauxhall Movano-e	2021	Van		No	Stellantis	Germany/United Kingdom			
Opel/Vauxhall Vivaro/Zafira-e	2021	Van	EMP2	No	Stellantis	Germany/United Kingdom			
Peugeot e-208	2019	Hatchback	eCMP	No	Stellantis	France			
Peugeot e-2008	2020	Crossover SUV	eCMP	No	Stellantis	France			
Peugeot e-308	2022	Hatchback	EMP2 V3	No	Stellantis	France			
Peugeot e-308 SW	2022	Station wagon	EMP2 V3	No	Stellantis	France			
Peugeot e-3008	2024	Crossover SUV	STLA Medium	No	Stellantis	France			
Peugeot e-408	2024	Crossover SUV	EMP2 V3	No	Stellantis	France			
Peugeot e-5008	2024	Crossover SUV	STLA Medium	No	Stellantis	France			
Peugeot e-Boxer	2021	Van		No	Stellantis	France			
Peugeot e-Expert/e-Traveller	2021	Van	EMP2	No	Stellantis	France			
Peugeot e-Rifter	2021	Van	EMP2	No	Stellantis	France			
Perodua QV-E	2025	Crossover SUV		Yes	Perodua	Malaysia			
Polestar 2	2020	Liftback	CMA	Yes	Volvo Cars	Sweden			
Polestar 3	2024	Crossover SUV	SPA2	Yes	Volvo Cars	Sweden			
Polestar 4	2023	Crossover SUV	SEA	Yes	Volvo Cars	Sweden			
Polytron G3	2025	Crossover SUV		Yes	Polytron (produced by Skyworth Auto)	Indonesia			
Porsche Cayenne (fourth generation)	2026	Crossover SUV	PPE	Yes	Porsche	Germany			
Porsche Macan (second generation)	2024	Crossover SUV	PPE	Yes	Porsche	Germany			
Porsche Taycan	2019	Sedan and shooting brake	J1	Yes	Porsche	Germany			
Proton eMas 5	2025	Hatchback	GEA	Yes	Proton (produced by Geely)	Malaysia			
Proton eMas 7	2024	Crossover SUV	GEA	Yes	Proton (produced by Geely)	Malaysia			
Range Rover Electric	2026	SUV	MLA-Flex	No	Jaguar Land Rover	United Kingdom			
Range Rover Sport Electric	2026	SUV	MLA-Flex	No	Jaguar Land Rover	United Kingdom			
Renault 4 E-Tech	2025	Crossover SUV	AmpR Small	Yes	Renault	France			
Renault 5 E-Tech	2024	Hatchback	AmpR Small	Yes	Renault	France			
Renault Kangoo E-Tech Electric	2021	Van	CMF-CD	No	Renault	France			
Renault Kwid E-Tech	2022	Hatchback	CMFA-EV	No	Renault	France			
Renault Master Z.E./E-Tech Electric	2018	Van		No	Renault	France			
Renault Megane E-Tech Electric	2022	Crossover SUV	AmpR Medium	Yes	Renault	France			
Renault Scenic E-Tech	2024	Crossover SUV	AmpR Medium	Yes	Renault	France			
Renault Trafic E-Tech	2021	Van		No	Renault	France			
Renault Twingo E-Tech	2026	Hatchback	AmpR Small	Yes	Renault	France			
Rivian EDV	2021	Van		Yes	Rivian	United States			
Rivian R1S	2022	SUV		Yes	Rivian	United States			
Rivian R1T	2021	Pickup truck		Yes	Rivian	United States			
Rivian R2	2026	SUV		Yes	Rivian	United States			
Rolls-Royce Spectre	2023	Coupé	Architecture of Luxury	Yes	Rolls-Royce	United Kingdom			
Škoda Elroq	2025	Crossover SUV	MEB	Yes	Škoda Auto	Czechia			
Škoda Enyaq	2020	Crossover SUV	MEB	Yes	Škoda Auto	Czechia			
Škoda Peaq	2026	Crossover SUV	MEB	Yes	Škoda Auto	Czechia			
Škoda Epiq	2026	Crossover SUV	MEB Entry	Yes	Škoda Auto	Czechia			
Smart #1	2022	Crossover SUV	SEA2	Yes	Smart Automobile (produced by Geely)	Germany			
Smart #3	2023	Crossover SUV	SEA2	Yes	Smart Automobile (produced by Geely)	Germany			
Smart #5	2024	Crossover SUV	PMA2+	Yes	Smart Automobile (produced by Geely)	Germany			
Subaru Solterra	2022	Crossover SUV	e-TNGA/e-SGP	Yes	Subaru (produced by Toyota)	Japan			
Subaru Trailseeker/E-Outback	2026	Crossover SUV	e-TNGA/e-SGP	Yes	Subaru (produced by Toyota)	Japan			
Subaru Uncharted	2025	Crossover SUV	e-TNGA/e-SGP	Yes	Subaru (produced by Toyota)	Japan			
Suzuki e Every	2026	Van	DNGA	No	Suzuki (produced by Toyota)	Japan			
Suzuki e Sky	2026	Hatchback	Heartect-e	Yes	Suzuki	Japan			
Suzuki e Vitara	2025	Crossover SUV	Heartect-e	Yes	Suzuki	Japan			
Tata Ace EV	2022	Minitruck		No	Tata Motors	India			
Tata Nexon.ev	2020	Crossover SUV		No	Tata Motors Passenger Vehicles	India			
Tata Punch.ev	2024	Crossover SUV	Acti.ev	Yes	Tata Motors Passenger Vehicles	India			
Tata Harrier.ev	2024	Crossover SUV	Acti.ev	Yes	Tata Motors Passenger Vehicles	India			
Tata Curvv.ev	2024	Crossover SUV	Acti.ev	Yes	Tata Motors Passenger Vehicles	India			
Tata Sierra EV	2026	Crossover SUV	Acti.ev	Yes	Tata Motors Passenger Vehicles	India			
Tata Tiago.ev	2022	Hatchback		No	Tata Motors Passenger Vehicles	India			
Tata Tigor EV	2022	Sedan		No	Tata Motors Passenger Vehicles	India			
Tesla Cybertruck	2023	Pickup		Yes	Tesla, Inc.	United States			
Tesla Cybercab	2026	Coupe		Yes	Tesla, Inc.	United States			
Tesla Model 3	2016	Sedan	Model 3	Yes	Tesla, Inc.	United States			
Tesla Model Y	2020	Crossover SUV	Model 3	Yes	Tesla, Inc.	United States			
Togg T10X	2022	Crossover SUV		Yes	Togg	Turkey			
Togg T10F	2025	Sedan		Yes	Togg	Turkey			
Toyota bZ4X/bZ	2022	Crossover SUV	e-TNGA	Yes	Toyota	Japan			
Toyota bZ4X Touring/bZ Woodland	2026	Crossover SUV	e-TNGA	Yes	Toyota	Japan			
Toyota C-HR+/C-HR	2025	Crossover SUV	e-TNGA	Yes	Toyota	Japan			
Toyota Hilux BEV/Travo-e	2026	Pickup	Toyota IMV	No	Toyota	Japan			
Toyota Pixis BEV	2026	Van	DNGA	No	Toyota (produced by Daihatsu)	Japan			
Toyota Proace City Electric	2021	Van	EMP2	No	Toyota (produced by Stellantis)	Japan			
Toyota Proace Electric	2021	Van	EMP2	No	Toyota (produced by Stellantis)	Japan			
Toyota Proace Max Electric	2023	Van		No	Toyota (produced by Stellantis)	Japan			
Toyota Urban Cruiser/Urban Cruiser Ebella	2025	Crossover SUV	Heartect-e	Yes	Toyota (produced by Suzuki)	Japan			
VinFast EC Van	2025	Van		Yes	VinFast	Vietnam			
VinFast Limo Green	2025	MPV/minivan		Yes	VinFast	Vietnam			
VinFast Minio Green	2025	Hatchback		Yes	VinFast	Vietnam			
VinFast VF e34	2021	Crossover SUV		Yes	VinFast	Vietnam			
VinFast VF 3	2024	Crossover SUV		Yes	VinFast	Vietnam			
VinFast VF 5	2023	Crossover SUV		Yes	VinFast	Vietnam			
VinFast VF 6	2024	Crossover SUV		Yes	VinFast	Vietnam			
VinFast VF 7	2024	Crossover SUV		Yes	VinFast	Vietnam			
VinFast VF 8	2022	Crossover SUV		Yes	VinFast	Vietnam			
VinFast VF 9	2023	Crossover SUV		Yes	VinFast	Vietnam			
Volkswagen e-Caravelle	2024	MPV/minivan	Ford Pro	No	Volkswagen Commercial Vehicles (produced by Ford)	Germany			
Volkswagen e-Crafter	2018	Van		No	Volkswagen Commercial Vehicles	Germany			
Volkswagen e-Transporter	2024	Van	Ford Pro	No	Volkswagen Commercial Vehicles (produced by Ford)	Germany			
Volkswagen ID.3	2020	Hatchback	MEB	Yes	Volkswagen	Germany			
Volkswagen ID.4	2020	Crossover SUV	MEB	Yes	Volkswagen	Germany			
Volkswagen ID.5	2022	Crossover SUV	MEB	Yes	Volkswagen	Germany			
Volkswagen ID.7	2023	Liftback	MEB	Yes	Volkswagen	Germany			
Volkswagen ID.7 Tourer	2024	Station Wagon	MEB	Yes	Volkswagen	Germany			
Volkswagen ID. Buzz	2022	MPV/minivan	MEB	Yes	Volkswagen	Germany			
Volkswagen ID. Buzz Cargo	2022	Van	MEB	Yes	Volkswagen	Germany			
Volkswagen ID. Cross	2026	Crossover SUV	MEB+	Yes	Volkswagen	Germany			
Volkswagen ID. Polo	2026	Hatchback	MEB Entry	Yes	Volkswagen	Germany			
Volvo EC40 (formerly C40 Recharge)	2021	Crossover SUV	CMA	No	Volvo Cars	Sweden			
Volvo ES90	2025	Liftback	SPA2	Yes	Volvo Cars	Sweden			
Volvo EX30	2023	Crossover SUV	SEA	Yes	Volvo Cars	Sweden			
Volvo EX40 (formerly XC40 Recharge)	2020	Crossover SUV	CMA	No	Volvo Cars	Sweden			
Volvo EX60	2026	Crossover SUV	SPA3	Yes	Volvo Cars	Sweden			
Volvo EX90	2024	Crossover SUV	SPA2	Yes	Volvo Cars	Sweden			

==== Chinese-market ====
Production highway-capable battery electric automobiles originating within the Chinese market, including vehicles produced by Chinese manufacturers for domestic market and export markets, and vehicles developed by foreign manufacturers that are only offered in the Chinese market:

Model	Calendar year produced	Body style	Manufacturer	Marque origin	Source
Aeolus E70	2015	Sedan	Dongfeng Motor	China	
Aeolus Sky EV01	2023	Crossover SUV	Dongfeng Motor	China	
Aion i60	2025	Crossover SUV	GAC Group	China	
Aion LX	2019	Crossover SUV	GAC Group	China	
Aion N60	2026	Crossover SUV	GAC Group	China	
Aion RT	2024	Sedan	GAC Group	China	
Aion S	2019	Sedan	GAC Group	China	
Aion S Max	2023	Sedan	GAC Group	China	
Aion S Plus / ES	2021	Sedan	GAC Group	China	
Aion UT	2025	Hatchback	GAC Group	China	
Aion V	2020	Crossover SUV	GAC Group	China	
Aion Y	2021	Crossover SUV	GAC Group	China	
Aishang A100C	2025	Hatchback	Wuling Motors	China	
Aistaland GT7	2026	Shooting brake	GAC Group	China	
AITO M5	2022	Crossover SUV	Seres Auto	China	
AITO M6	2026	Crossover SUV	Seres Auto	China	
AITO M7	2025	Crossover SUV	Seres Auto	China	
AITO M8	2025	Crossover SUV	Seres Auto	China	
AITO M9	2023	Crossover SUV	Seres Auto	China	
Arcfox αS5	2024	Sedan	BAIC Group	China	
Arcfox αS6	2021	Sedan	BAIC Group	China	
Arcfox αT5	2024	Crossover SUV	BAIC Group	China	
Arcfox αT6	2020	Crossover SUV	BAIC Group	China	
Arcfox Beta S3	2026	Sedan	BAIC Group	China	
Arcfox Kaola	2023	MPV/minivan	BAIC Group	China	
Arcfox T1	2025	Hatchback	BAIC Group	China	
Audi Q5 e-tron	2021	Crossover SUV	Audi (SAIC Volkswagen)	Germany	
AUDI E5	2025	Station Wagon	SAIC Volkswagen	Germany	
AUDI E7X	2026	Crossover SUV	Audi (SAIC Volkswagen)	Germany	
Avatr 06	2025	Sedan	Avatr Technology	China	
Avatr 06T	2026	Station Wagon	Avatr Technology	China	
Avatr 07	2024	Crossover SUV	Avatr Technology	China	
Avatr 11	2022	Crossover SUV	Avatr Technology	China	
Avatr 12	2023	Sedan	Avatr Technology	China	
Baojun Yep	2023	Mini SUV	SAIC-GM-Wuling	China	
Baojun Yep Plus	2024	Mini SUV	SAIC-GM-Wuling	China	
Baojun Yunduo / Wuling Cloud EV	2023	Hatchback	SAIC-GM-Wuling	China	
Baojun Yunhai	2024	Crossover SUV	SAIC-GM-Wuling	China	
Baojun Xiangjing	2025	Sedan	SAIC-GM-Wuling	China	
BAW Yuanbao	2021	Hatchback	BAW	China	
BAW Ruisheng Wangpai E-M7	2022	MPV/minivan	BAW	China	
Bestune Pony	2023	Hatchback	FAW Group	China	
Bestune Yueyi 03	2025	Crossover SUV	FAW Group	China	
Bestune Yueyi 08	2026	Sedan	FAW Group	China	
Beijing EU8	2026	Sedan	BAIC Group	China	
Beijing Xingtan 5X	2026	SUV	BAIC Group	China	
Buick Electra E5	2023	Crossover SUV	General Motors (SAIC-GM)	United States	
Buick Electra Encasa	2025	MPV/minivan	General Motors (SAIC-GM)	United States	
Buick Electra L7	2025	Sedan	General Motors (SAIC-GM)	United States	
Buick Velite 6	2022	Liftback	General Motors (SAIC-GM)	United States	
BYD Atto 3 / Yuan Plus	2022	Crossover SUV	BYD Auto	China	
BYD Datang EV	2026	Crossover SUV	BYD Auto	China	
BYD Dahan EV	2026	Sedan	BYD Auto	China	
BYD Dolphin	2021	Hatchback	BYD Auto	China	
BYD E-Vali	2025	Van	BYD Auto	China	
BYD e2	2019	Hatchback	BYD Auto	China	
BYD e6	2011	MPV/minivan	BYD Auto	China	
BYD e7	2025	Sedan	BYD Auto	China	
BYD e9	2021	Sedan	BYD Auto	China	
BYD Han EV	2020	Sedan	BYD Auto	China	
BYD Han L EV	2025	Sedan	BYD Auto	China	
BYD M6 / eMax 7	2024	MPV/minivan	BYD Auto	China	
BYD Qin Plus EV	2021	Sedan	BYD Auto	China	
BYD Qin L EV	2025	Sedan	BYD Auto	China	
BYD Racco	2026	Microvan	BYD Auto	China	
BYD Seagull / Dolphin Mini / Dolphin Surf / Atto 1	2023	Hatchback	BYD Auto	China	
BYD Seal	2022	Sedan	BYD Auto	China	
BYD Seal 06 GT	2024	Hatchback	BYD Auto	China	
BYD Seal 06 EV	2025	Sedan	BYD Auto	China	
BYD Seal 07 EV	2026	Sedan	BYD Auto	China	
BYD Seal 08 EV	2026	Sedan	BYD Auto	China	
BYD Sealion 05 EV	2025	Crossover SUV	BYD Auto	China	
BYD Sealion 06 EV	2025	Crossover SUV	BYD Auto	China	
BYD Sealion 07 EV / Sealion 7	2024	Crossover SUV	BYD Auto	China	
BYD Sealion 08 EV	2026	SUV	BYD Auto	China	
BYD Song L EV	2023	Crossover SUV	BYD Auto	China	
BYD Song Plus EV / Seal U	2020	Crossover SUV	BYD Auto	China	
BYD Song Ultra EV	2026	Crossover SUV	BYD Auto	China	
BYD T3/ETP3	2015	MPV/minivan	BYD Auto	China	
BYD Tang EV / Tan EV	2015	Crossover SUV	BYD Auto	China	
BYD Tang L EV	2025	Crossover SUV	BYD Auto	China	
BYD V3	2020	Van	BYD Auto	China	
BYD Yuan Up/Pro / S1 Pro / Atto 2	2024	Crossover SUV	BYD Auto	China	
Changan Lantuozhe EV	2023	Pick Up	Changan Automobile	China	
Changan Lumin	2022	Hatchback	Changan Automobile	China	
Changan Nevo A06	2025	Sedan	Changan Automobile	China	
Changan Nevo A07	2023	Sedan	Changan Automobile	China	
Changan Nevo E07 / Deepal E07	2024	SUV pickup	Changan Automobile	China	
Changan Nevo Q05	2025	Crossover SUV	Changan Automobile	China	
Changan Nevo Q06	2026	Crossover SUV	Changan Automobile	China	
Changan Ruixing EM80		Van	Changan Automobile	China	
Chery Arrizo e	2019	Sedan	Chery	China	
Chery Duomi	2025	Hatchback	Chery	China	
Chery eQ1 / Aiqar eQ1	2017	Hatchback	Chery	China	
Chery eQ7 / Aiqar eQ7	2023	Crossover SUV	Chery	China	
Chery Fulwin A9	2026	Sedan	Chery	China	
Chery Fulwin T7	2026	Crossover SUV	Chery	China	
Chery Fulwin X3/X3 Plus	2025	Crossover SUV	Chery	China	
Chery Omoda E5 / Omoda E5/C5 EV	2023	Crossover SUV	Chery	China	
Chery QQ3	2026	Hatchback	Chery	China	
Chery QQ Ice Cream / Jetour Ice Cream / Aiqar QQ Ice Cream	2021	Hatchback	Chery	China	
Dayun Yuanzhi M1	2021	MPV/minivan	Dayun Group	China	
Dayun Yuehu ES3	2021	Hatchback	Dayun Group	China	
Deepal L06	2025	Sedan	Changan Automobile	China	
Deepal L07	2022	Sedan	Changan Automobile	China	
Deepal S05	2024	Crossover SUV	Changan Automobile	China	
Deepal S07	2023	Crossover SUV	Changan Automobile	China	
Denza D9	2022	MPV/minivan	BYD Auto	China	
Denza N8L	2026	SUV	BYD Auto	China	
Denza Z	2026	Sports Car	BYD Auto	China	
Denza Z9S	2026	Sedan	BYD Auto	China	
Denza Z9 GT	2024	Shooting brake	BYD Auto	China	
Dongfeng eπ 007	2024	Sedan	Dongfeng Motor	China	
Dongfeng eπ 008	2024	Crossover SUV	Dongfeng Motor	China	
Dongfeng eπ M8	2026	Crossover SUV	Dongfeng Motor	China	
Dongfeng EM13	2018	Van	Dongfeng Motor	China	
Dongfeng Nammi 01	2024	Hatchback	Dongfeng Motor	China	
Dongfeng Nammi 06	2025	Crossover SUV	Dongfeng Motor	China	
Dongfeng Ruitaite EM10		Van	Dongfeng Motor	China	
Dongfeng Sokon EC31/EC35/EC36	2018	Pickup truck and van	Seres Auto (Hubei)	China	
Epicland X9	2026	SUV	Dongfeng Motor	China	
Exeed EX7	2026	Crossover SUV	Chery	China	
Exeed ES / Exlantix ES	2023	Sedan	Chery	China	
Exeed Sterra ET / Exlantix ET	2024	Crossover SUV	Chery	China	
Fangchengbao Formula S	2026	Sedan	BYD Auto	China	
Fangchengbao Formula S GT	2026	Shooting brake	BYD Auto	China	
Fangchengbao Tai 3	2025	Crossover SUV	BYD Auto	China	
Fangchengbao Ti7	2026	Crossover SUV	BYD Auto	China	
Farizon SV	2024	Van	Farizon Auto	China	
Farizon Xingxiang V	2022	Van	Farizon Auto	China	
Fengon Mini EV	2022	Hatchback	Seres Automobile (Hubei)	China	
Fengon E380	2022	MPV/minivan	Seres Automobile (Hubei)	China	
Firefly	2025	Hatchback	Nio	China	
Ford Bronco New Energy	2025	Crossover SUV	Ford (JMC-Ford)	United States	
Forthing Leiting / Friday EV	2023	Crossover SUV	Dongfeng Motor	China	
Forthing Xinghai S7	2024	Sedan	Dongfeng Motor	China	
Foton Smart Smurf E7	2022	Van	BAIC Group	China	
Freelander 8	2026	SUV	Chery (Chery Jaguar Land Rover)	China	
Geely Galaxy A7	2026	Sedan	Geely	China	
Geely Galaxy E5 / Geely EX5	2024	Crossover SUV	Geely	China	
Geely Galaxy E8	2023	Sedan	Geely	China	
Geely Galaxy Starship 7 EV	2024	Crossover SUV	Geely	China	
Geely Galaxy LEVC L380	2025	MPV/minivan	Geely	China	
Geely Galaxy TT	2026	Sedan	Geely	China	
Geely EX2 / Xingyuan / E2	2024	Hatchback	Geely	China	
Geely Panda Mini EV	2022	Hatchback	Geely	China	
Geometry A	2019	Sedan	Geely	China	
Geometry G6	2023	Sedan	Geely	China	
Geometry M6	2022	Crossover SUV	Geely	China	
Geometry E	2022	Crossover SUV	Geely	China	
Honda e:NS2	2024	Crossover SUV	Honda (Dongfeng Honda)	Japan	
Honda GT	2026	Sedan	Honda (GAC Honda)	Japan	
Honda S7	2025	Crossover SUV	Honda (Dongfeng Honda)	Japan	
Honda P7	2025	Crossover SUV	Honda (GAC Honda)	Japan	
Hongqi E-HS9	2020	Crossover SUV	FAW Group	China	
Hongqi E-QM5	2022	Sedan	FAW Group	China	
Hongqi EH7	2024	Sedan	FAW Group	China	
Hongqi Tiangong 05	2025	Sedan	FAW Group	China	
Hongqi Tiangong 06	2025	Crossover SUV	FAW Group	China	
Hongqi Tiangong 08/EHS7	2024	Crossover SUV	FAW Group	China	
Hyptec GT	2023	Sedan	GAC Group	China	
Hyptec HL	2025	SUV	GAC Group	China	
Hyptec HT	2023	Crossover SUV	GAC Group	China	
Hyptec S600	2026	Crossover SUV	GAC Group	China	
Hyptec SSR	2023	Sports car	GAC Group	China	
Hyundai EO	2025	Crossover SUV	Hyundai	South Korea	
Hyundai Ioniq V	2026	Sedan	Hyundai	South Korea	
IM L6 / MG IM5	2024	Liftback	IM Motors	China	
IM L7	2022	Sedan	IM Motors	China	
IM LS7	2022	Crossover SUV	IM Motors	China	
IM LS6 / MG IM6	2023	Crossover SUV	IM Motors	China	
iCar 03 / Chery J6 / Jaecoo J6/EJ6/6 EV	2023	Crossover SUV	Chery	China	
iCar V23	2024	Crossover SUV	Chery	China	
JAC iC5 / E J7 / Sehol E50A	2019	Sedan	JAC Motors	China	
JAC iEV7	2016	Sedan	JAC Motors	China	
JAC iEVA50	2018	Sedan	JAC Motors	China	
JAC Lanmao M1	2022	Van	JAC Motors	China	
JAC Van Baolu	2024	Van	JAC Motors	China	
JAC Yiwei 3	2023	Hatchback	JAC Motors	China	
JAC Yiwei Hua Xian Zi	2024	Hatchback	JAC Motors	China	
JAC Yiwei Aipao	2024	Sedan	JAC Motors	China	
Jaecoo J5 EV / E5	2025	Crossover SUV	Chery	China	
Jetour X50e / eVT5	2025	Crossover SUV	Chery	China	
Jetta M6	2026	Sedan	FAW-Volkswagen	China	
Jiangnan U2	2023	Hatchback	Jiangnan Automobile	China	
JMC E-Fushun	2025	Van and Truck	JMC	China	
JMC E-Lushun V6	2022	Van	JMC	China	
JMEV EV3	2019	Hatchback	JMEV	China	
JMEV Yi	2022	Sedan	JMEV	China	
JMEV Xiaoqilin	2022	Hatchback	JMEV	China	
JY Air	2024	Liftback	Juneyao Auto	China	
Kaicene V919	2025	Van	Changan Automobile	China	
Kaiyi Shiyue	2023	Hatchback	Kaiyi Auto	China	
Karry Dolphin	2019	Van	Chery	China	
Karry Porpoise	2022	Van	Chery	China	
Karry Little Elephant EV	2022	Truck	Chery	China	
Leapmotor A05 / B03	2026	Hatchback	Leapmotor	China	
Leapmotor A10 / B03X	2026	Crossover SUV	Leapmotor	China	
Leapmotor B01	2025	Sedan	Leapmotor	China	
Leapmotor B10	2025	Crossover SUV	Leapmotor	China	
Leapmotor C10	2023	Crossover SUV	Leapmotor	China	
Leapmotor C11	2020	Crossover SUV	Leapmotor	China	
Leapmotor C16	2024	Crossover SUV	Leapmotor	China	
Leapmotor D19	2026	SUV	Leapmotor	China	
Leapmotor D99	2026	MPV/minivan	Leapmotor	China	
Leapmotor Lafa 5 / B05	2025	Hatchback	Leapmotor	China	
Leapmotor T03	2020	Hatchback	Leapmotor	China	
Lepas E4 EV / L4 EV	2026	Crossover SUV	Chery	China	
LEVC L380	2024	MPV/minivan	LEVC	United Kingdom	
Li i6	2025	Crossover SUV	Li Auto	China	
Li i8	2025	Crossover SUV	Li Auto	China	
Li i9	2026	Crossover SUV	Li Auto	China	
Li Mega	2024	MPV/minivan	Li Auto	China	
Lingxi L	2024	Sedan	Dongfeng Honda	China-Japan	
Livan 7	2023	Crossover SUV	Geely	China	
Livan 8	2024	MPV/minivan	Geely	China	
Livan 9	2022	Crossover SUV	Geely	China	
Livan Blue Balloon	2025	Hatchback	Geely	China	
Luxeed R7	2024	Crossover SUV	Chery	China	
Luxeed RX	2026	Crossover SUV	Chery	China	
Luxeed S7	2023	Sedan	Chery	China	
Lynk & Co 10 (formerly Z10)	2024	Sedan	Geely	China	
Lynk & Co 20 (formerly Z20)	2024	Crossover SUV	Geely	China	
Landian E3	2023	Crossover SUV	Seres	China	
Maextro S800	2025	Sedan	JAC Motors	China	
Maxus Dana V1	2023	Van	SAIC Motor	China	
Maxus Dana M1	2024	MPV/minivan	SAIC Motor	China	
Maxus EG10	2016	MPV/minivan	SAIC Motor	China	
Maxus Mifa 7 / MG Maxus 7	2023	MPV/minivan	SAIC Motor	China	
Maxus Mira 9 / MG Maxus 9/Mifa 9/M9 EV	2021	MPV/minivan	SAIC Motor	China	
Maxus EV30	2018	Van	SAIC Motor	China	
Maxus EV70	2023	Van	SAIC Motor	China	
Maxus EV80	2014	Van	SAIC Motor	China	
Maxus T90 EV	2021	Pickup truck	SAIC Motor	China	
Maxus eTerron 9	2024	Pickup truck	SAIC Motor	China	
Mazda EZ-6	2024	Liftback	Mazda	Japan	
Mazda EZ-60	2025	Crossover SUV	Mazda	Japan	
MG 07	2026	Liftback	SAIC Motor	China	
MG 4X	2026	Crossover SUV	SAIC Motor	China	
MG Comet EV	2023	Microcar hatchback	SAIC Motor	China	
MG Cyberster	2023	Roadster	SAIC Motor	China	
MG Hector Tomahawk	2026	Crossover SUV	SAIC Motor	China	
MG Windsor EV	2024	Hatchback	SAIC Motor	China	
MG ZS EV / EZS	2018	Crossover SUV	SAIC Motor	China	
MG4 EV	2022	Hatchback	SAIC Motor	China	
MGS5 EV / MG ES5	2024	Crossover SUV	SAIC Motor	China	
MGS6 EV	2025	Crossover SUV	SAIC Motor	China	
Modern IN	2021	Crossover SUV	Beijing Automobile Works	China	
M-Hero 917	2023	SUV	Dongfeng Motor	China	
NAC Chang Da H9	2017	Van	Nanjing Automobile-SAIC Motor	China	
Nio EC6	2020	Crossover SUV	Nio	China	
Nio EC7	2023	Crossover SUV	Nio	China	
Nio ES6	2019	Crossover SUV	Nio	China	
Nio ES7	2022	Crossover SUV	Nio	China	
Nio ES8	2018	Crossover SUV	Nio	China	
Nio ES9	2026	Crossover SUV	Nio	China	
Nio ET5	2021	Sedan	Nio	China	
Nio ET5 Touring / ET5T	2023	Station wagon	Nio	China	
Nio ET7	2021	Sedan	Nio	China	
Nio ET9	2025	Liftback	Nio	China	
Nissan N7	2025	Sedan	Nissan (Dongfeng Nissan)	Japan	
Nissan NX8	2026	Crossover SUV	Nissan (Dongfeng Nissan)	Japan	
Omoda O4	2026	Crossover SUV	Chery	China	
Onvo L60	2024	Crossover SUV	Nio	China	
Onvo L80	2026	Crossover SUV	Nio	China	
Onvo L90	2025	Crossover SUV	Nio	China	
Ora 5	2025	Crossover SUV	Great Wall Motor	China	
Ora Ballet Cat	2022	Hatchback	Great Wall Motor	China	
Ora Good Cat / Funky Cat / 03 / GWM Ora	2020	Hatchback	Great Wall Motor	China	
Ora Lightning Cat / Next Cat / Grand Cat / 07	2022	Sedan and Station wagon	Great Wall Motor	China	
Radar Horizon	2022	Pickup truck	Geely	China	
Rely R08 EV	2026	Pickup truck	Chery	China	
Roewe D6	2025	Sedan	SAIC Motor	China	
Roewe D7 EV	2023	Sedan	SAIC Motor	China	
Roewe Ei5 / MG5 EV / MG EP/ES	2017	Station wagon	SAIC Motor	China	
Roewe iMAX8 EV	2022	MPV/minivan	SAIC Motor	China	
SAIC Rising F7	2022	Liftback	SAIC Motor	China	
SAIC Rising R7	2022	Crossover SUV	SAIC Motor	China	
SAIC H5	2025	Crossover SUV	SAIC Motor	China	
SAIC Z7	2026	Sedan	SAIC Motor	China	
SAIC Z7T	2026	Shooting brake	SAIC Motor	China	
Sehol E40X	2020	Crossover SUV	JAC Motors	China	
Sehol E50A	2021	Liftback	JAC Motors	China	
Sehol E50A Pro	2022	Liftback	JAC Motors	China	
Sehol E10X	2021	Hatchback	JAC Motors	China	
Seres 3 / E3	2020	Crossover SUV	Seres	China	
Seres E1	2023	Microcar hatchback	Seres	China	
Seres M5	2024	Crossover SUV	Seres	China	
Seres SF5 / A5 / 5	2019	Crossover SUV	Seres	China	
SiTech DEV1	2018	Hatchback	SiTech	China	
Skyworth EV6	2021	Crossover SUV	Skyworth Auto	China	
Small Sports Car SC01	2025	Sports car	JMEV	China	
SRM Shineray X30LEV	2018	Van	Shineray Group	China	
Stelato G9	2026	SUV	BAIC Group	China	
Stelato S9	2024	Sedan	BAIC Group	China	
Stelato S9T	2025	Station Wagon	BAIC Group	China	
Stelato V8	2026	MPV/minivan	BAIC Group	China	
Toyota bZ3	2023	Sedan	FAW Toyota	Japan	
Toyota bZ3X	2025	Crossover SUV	GAC Toyota	Japan	
Toyota bZ5	2025	Crossover SUV	FAW Toyota	Japan	
Toyota bZ7	2026	Sedan	GAC Toyota	Japan	
Venucia D60EV	2019	Sedan	Dongfeng Nissan	China	
Venucia T60EV	2019	Crossover SUV	Dongfeng Nissan	China	
Venucia VX6	2023	Crossover SUV	Dongfeng Nissan	China	
Volkswagen ID.6	2021	Crossover SUV	Volkswagen	Germany	
Volkswagen ID. Aura T6	2026	Crossover SUV	Volkswagen	Germany	
Volkswagen ID. Era 5X	2026	Crossover SUV	Volkswagen	Germany	
Volkswagen ID. Unyx 06	2024	Crossover SUV	Volkswagen	Germany	
Volkswagen ID. Unyx 07	2026	Liftback	Volkswagen	Germany	
Volkswagen ID. Unyx 08	2026	Crossover SUV	Volkswagen	Germany	
Volkswagen ID. Unyx 09	2026	Sedan	Volkswagen	Germany	
Volvo EM90	2024	MPV/minivan	Volvo Cars	Sweden	
Voyah Courage	2024	Crossover SUV	Dongfeng Motor	China	
Voyah Dream	2021	MPV/minivan	Dongfeng Motor	China	
Voyah Free	2021	Crossover SUV	Dongfeng Motor	China	
Voyah Passion	2022	Sedan	Dongfeng Motor	China	
Voyah Passion S	2026	Crossover SUV	Dongfeng Motor	China	
Voyah Taishan X8	2026	Crossover SUV	Dongfeng Motor	China	
Weiwang 407 EV	2018	Van	BAIC Group	China	
Wuling Air EV	2022	Microcar hatchback	SAIC-GM-Wuling	China	
Wuling Binguo	2023	Hatchback	SAIC-GM-Wuling	China	
Wuling Binguo Plus	2024	Crossover SUV	SAIC-GM-Wuling	China	
Wuling Binguo Pro	2026	Hatchback	SAIC-GM-Wuling	China	
Wuling Binguo S	2025	Crossover SUV	SAIC-GM-Wuling	China	
Wuling EV50 / Dianka	2020	Van	Wuling Motors	China	
Wuling EV80	2018	Van	Wuling Motors	China	
Wuling Hongguang EV	2024	Van	SAIC-GM-Wuling	China	
Wuling Hongguang Mini EV	2020	Microcar hatchback	SAIC-GM-Wuling	China	
Wuling Starlight 730/Darion	2025	MPV/minivan	SAIC-GM-Wuling	China	
Wuling Starlight	2023	Sedan	SAIC-GM-Wuling	China	
Wuling Starlight 560/Eksion	2026	Crossover SUV	SAIC-GM-Wuling	China	
Wuling Starlight S	2024	Crossover SUV	SAIC-GM-Wuling	China	
Wuling Yangguang	2024	Van	SAIC-GM-Wuling	China	
Wuling Yangguang L	2026	Van	SAIC-GM-Wuling	China	
Wuling Yangguang Pro	2026	Van	SAIC-GM-Wuling	China	
Wuling Zhiguang EV	2025	Van	SAIC-GM-Wuling	China	
Xiaohu FEV	2021	Hatchback	Henrey Automobile	China	
Xiaomi SU7	2024	Sedan	Xiaomi Auto	China	
Xiaomi YU7	2025	Crossover SUV	Xiaomi Auto	China	
XPeng G6	2023	Crossover SUV	XPeng	China	
XPeng G7	2025	Crossover SUV	XPeng	China	
XPeng G9	2022	Crossover SUV	XPeng	China	
XPeng G9L	2026	SUV	XPeng	China	
XPeng GX	2026	SUV	XPeng	China	
XPeng Mona L03 / L03	2026	Crossover SUV	XPeng	China	
XPeng Mona L05	2026	Crossover SUV	XPeng	China	
XPeng Mona M03	2024	Liftback	XPeng	China	
XPeng P7	2020	Sedan	XPeng	China	
XPeng P7+	2024	Liftback	XPeng	China	
XPeng X9	2023	MPV/minivan	XPeng	China	
Yangwang U7	2024	Sedan	BYD Auto	China	
Yangwang U9	2023	Coupe	BYD Auto	China	
Yudo Yuntu	2023	Hatchback	Yudo Auto	China	
Zhidou Rainbow	2024	Hatchback	Zhidou	China	
Zeekr 001	2021	Shooting brake	Geely	China	
Zeekr 007	2023	Sedan	Geely	China	
Zeekr 007 GT	2025	Shooting brake	Geely	China	
Zeekr 009	2022	MPV/minivan	Geely	China	
Zeekr 7X	2024	Crossover SUV	Geely	China	
Zeekr X	2023	Crossover SUV	Geely	China	
Zeekr Mix	2024	MPV/minivan	Geely	China	

=== Non-highway capable automobiles ===
Battery electric automobiles not capable of 100 km/h (62 mph) highway speed:

Model	Calendar year produced	Manufacturer	Marque origin
Aixam e-City/e-Coupe	2017	Aixam	France
Citroën Ami / Opel Rocks Electric / Fiat Topolino	2020	Stellantis	France/Germany/Italy
Microlino	2022	Micro Mobility Systems	Italy/Switzerland
Sôki	2015	Voze EV	Chile
Toyota COMS	2000	Toyota Auto Body	Japan
XEV Yoyo	2021	XEV	Italy/Hong Kong

== Former production models ==
=== Post-1995 ===
==== Outside the Chinese market ====
Model	Calendar year produced	Calendar year discontinued	Manufacturer	Marque origin	Notes
Acura ZDX	2024	2025	Acura (produced by General Motors)	Japan	
Aspark Owl	2020	2024	Aspark	Japan	
Audi Q8 e-tron	2018	2025	Audi	Germany	
Audi R8 e-Tron	2015	2015	Audi	Germany	Fewer than 100 units were sold at the end of production run.
Azure Transit Connect Electric	2010	2012	Azure Dynamics and Ford	United States	Around 500 units were sold before Azure stopped production in March 2012.
Bolloré Bluecar	2011		Véhicule Électriques Pininfarina Bolloré	France	Cumulative sales in France totaled 5,689 units by the end of September 2016.
BMW i3 (International) and BMW i3 REx	2013	2022	BMW	Germany	Global sales exceeded 250,000 throughout lifetime.
Canoo Lifestyle Vehicle	2023	2025	Canoo	United States	
Chevrolet Bolt EV	2016	2023	General Motors	United States	
Chevrolet Bolt EUV	2021	2023	General Motors	United States	
Chevrolet BrightDrop	2022	2025	General Motors	United States	
Chevrolet S-10 EV	1997	1998	General Motors	United States	S-10 with GM EV1 powertrain, over 100 produced and only about 60 sold to private owners.
Chevrolet Spark EV	2013	2016	General Motors	United States	The Spark EV was released in selected markets in California and Oregon in June 2013. GM planned to sell the Spark in Canada, South Korea and select European markets.
Chrysler TEVan/EPIC	1993	1999	Chrysler	United States	Sold primarily to electric utilities, only 56 were produced and were sold for approximately $120,000 each.
Citroën AX Électrique	1993	1996	PSA Group	France	374 produced between December 1993 and 1996.
Citroën Berlingo électrique	1998	2005	PSA Group	France	
Citroën Berlingo Electric (2010)	2010	2013	PSA Group	France	In 2016 worldwide sales were 491, with just 19 sold in the UK.
Citroën C1 ev'ie	2009	2011	PSA Group	France	EV conversion produced by Electric Car Corporation.
Citroën C-Zero	2010	2020	PSA Group (produced by Mitsubishi Motors)	France	Similar to Mitsubishi i-MiEV.
Citroën E-Méhari	2016	2019	PSA Group and Bolloré	France	Approximately 1,000 cars were planned to be produced in collaboration with the French electric car producer Bolloré.
Citroën Saxo Électrique	1997	2002	PSA Group	France	6,400 produced with Peugeot 106.
Coda Sedan	2012	2013	Coda Automotive	United States	Sales began in California in March 2012.
Elcat Electric Vehicles	1990	2002	ELCAT	Finland	
Fiat 500e	2013	2019	Fiat Chrysler Automobiles	Italy	U.S. sales totaled 27,211 units.
Ford F-150 Lightning	2022	2025	Ford	United States	
Ford Focus Electric	2011	2018	Ford	United States	U.S. sales totaled 9,226 units.
Ford Ranger EV	1998	2003	Ford	United States	Several hundred were produced for lease only, almost all were recovered and most destroyed.
Ford Think City	2000	2002	Ford	United States	
Fisker Ocean	2022	2024	Fisker Inc.	United States	
General Motors EV1	1996	2003	General Motors	United States	First generation (1996–1997) used VRLA batteries, second generation (1999–2003) used NiMH batteries.
Honda Clarity Electric	2017	2019	Honda	Japan	
Honda e	2020	2024	Honda	Japan	
Honda EV Plus	1997	1999	Honda	Japan	About 300 produced.
Honda Fit EV	2012	2014	Honda	Japan	Production was to be limited to only 1,100 units over the first three years. Deliveries to retail customers in the U.S. began in July 2012 and availability is limited to California and Oregon.
Hyundai Ioniq Electric	2016	2022	Hyundai	South Korea	
Jaguar I-Pace	2018	2024	Jaguar Land Rover	United Kingdom	
Kia Niro EV/e-Niro	2018	2026	Kia	South Korea	
Kia Soul EV	2014	2023	Kia	South Korea	
Lexus UX 300e	2020	2025	Toyota	Japan	
Lordstown Endurance	2022	2023	Lordstown Motors	United States	
Lotus Evija	2023	2024	Lotus Cars	United Kingdom	
Lumeneo Smera	2013	2013	Lumeneo	France	Highway speed-capable microcar. Sold 10 cars in 2013 before going bankrupt.
Luxgen 7 MPV EV+	2010		Yulon Motors	Taiwan	
Luxgen S3 EV+	2017	2020	Yulon Motors	Taiwan	
Luxgen U5 EV+	2019	2020	Yulon Motors	Taiwan	
Mahindra e2o	2013	2017	Mahindra Electric	India	
Mahindra e2o Plus	2016	2019	Mahindra & Mahindra	India	
Mahindra eVerito	2016	2019	Mahindra & Mahindra	India	
Mahindra XUV400	2022	2026	Mahindra	India	
Mercedes-Benz A-Class E-Cell	2010	2010	Daimler AG	Germany	Developed with Tesla Motors. Limited production of 500 A-Class E-Cell electric cars was built, for trial purposes and lease to customers in Europe.
Mercedes-Benz B-Class Electric Drive	2014	2019	Daimler AG	Germany	Production for retail customers began in April 2014.
Mercedes-Benz eCitan	2022	2026	Mercedes-Benz Group (produced by Renault)	Germany	
Mercedes-Benz EQA	2021	2026	Mercedes-Benz Group	Germany	
Mercedes-Benz EQB	2021	2026	Mercedes-Benz Group	Germany	
Mercedes-Benz EQC	2019	2023	Mercedes-Benz Group	Germany	
Mercedes-Benz EQT	2023	2026	Mercedes-Benz Group (produced by Renault)	Germany	
Mercedes-Benz SLS AMG Electric Drive	2013	2013	Daimler AG	Germany	Fewer than 100 units were sold.
Mercedes-Benz Vito E-Cell	2010		Daimler AG	Germany	
Mia	2011	2013	Mia Electric	France	
Mini Electric/Cooper SE	2019	2024	Mini/BMW	United Kingdom	
Mitsubishi i-MiEV	2009	2021	Mitsubishi Motors	Japan	Was available in Asia, Europe and the Americas. It was the first electric car to sell more than 10,000 units, including Citroën C-Zero and Peugeot iOn. According to Guinness World Records, the record was reached in February 2011. Global sales totaled about 37,600 units through June 2016.
Mobilize Limo	2022	2023	Mobilize/Renault	France	
Mobilize Duo	2024	2025	Mobilize/Renault	France	
Modec	2007	2011	Modec	United Kingdom	Electric delivery vans.
Navistar eStar	2010	2013	Navistar	United States	
NEVS 9-3 EV	2017	2022	NEVS AB	Sweden	
Nissan Altra EV	1998	2002	Nissan	Japan	Only about 200 vehicles were ever produced mainly for fleet.
Nissan Hypermini	1999	2001	Nissan	Japan	219 produced.
Opel Ampera-e	2017	2020	PSA Group (produced by General Motors)	Germany	
Peugeot 106 Électrique	1996	2003	PSA Group	France	Similar to Citroën Saxo
Peugeot iOn	2010	2020	PSA Group (produced by Mitsubishi Motors)	France	Similar to Mitsubishi i-MiEV.
Peugeot Partner Électrique	1998	2005	PSA Group	France	
Pininfarina Battista	2022	2025	Automobili Pininfarina	Germany/Italy	
Renault Fluence Z.E./Renault Samsung SM3 Z.E.	2011	2020	Renault	France	Global sales totaled 10,600 units through December 2019, mostly composed of SM3 Z.E. units.
Renault Twingo Z.E.	2020	2024	Renault	France	
Renault Twizy	2012	2023	Renault	France	
Renault Zoe	2012	2024	Renault	France	
REVA/REVAi/G-Wiz i	2001	2019	Reva Electric Car Company	India	Since 2001 more than 4,000 cars were sold worldwide by March 2011 and was available in 26 countries. Sales in the UK, where it was sold as the G-Wiz and became its main market, ended by late 2011.
Rimac Nevera	2022	2026	Rimac Automobili	Croatia	
SEAT e-Mii	2020	2021	SEAT	Spain	
Škoda/Tatra Beta	1994	1997	Škoda ELCAR Ejpovice	Czech Republic	About 100 produced, using nickel-cadmium batteries
Škoda Citigo iV	2019	2020	Škoda Auto	Czech Republic	Similar to Volkswagen e-Up.
Smart ED	2007	2017	Daimler AG	Germany	Available for lease in the United States since early 2011. Originally converted by Zytek from 100 Smart Fortwos.
Smart EQ fortwo	2017	2024	Daimler AG	Germany	
Smart EQ forfour	2017	2021	Daimler AG (produced by Renault)	Germany	
Tesla Model S	2012	2026	Tesla, Inc.	United States	
Tesla Model X	2015	2026	Tesla, Inc.	United States	
Tesla Roadster (first generation)	2008	2012	Tesla Motors	United States	
The Kurrent	2006	2007	American Electric Motor Vehicle Company	United States	Neighborhood electric vehicle.
Think City	2008	2011	Think Global	Norway	Successor of the Ford Th!nk.
Toyota eQ/Scion iQ EV	2011	2013	Toyota	Japan	Deployed in limited quantities for research purposes.
Toyota RAV4 EV (1997)	1997	2003	Toyota	Japan	Leased and sold on US east and west coast. 1,484 were leased and/or sold in California.
Toyota RAV4 EV (2012)	2012	2014	Toyota	Japan	Leased and sold only in California, from 2012 through 2015. 2,489 units were sold in the U.S. through April 2015.
Toyota C+pod	2021	2024	Toyota	Japan	
Tobe M’Car EV	2009	2013	Yulon Motors	Taiwan	
Tobe W’Car EV	2010	2013	Yulon Motors	Taiwan	
Tazzari Zero	2009	2022	Tazzari	Italy	
ThunderPower EV/TP	2019		Thunder Power	Taiwan	
ThunderPower Chloe	2020		Thunder Power	Taiwan	
Volkswagen e-Golf	2014	2020	Volkswagen	Germany	
Volkswagen e-Up!	2013	2023	Volkswagen	Germany	NSF
Volvo C30 Electric	2010	2012	Volvo Cars	Sweden	
Venturi Fétish	2004	2007	Venturi	Monaco	Only 25 units have been produced.
Wheego Whip LiFe	2011	2013	Shuanghuan Auto and Wheego Technologies	China-United States	Sales began in the U.S. in April 2011. A total of 34 units had been sold by March 2012, and 400 had been produced when production ended in 2013.
ZENN	2006	2010	ZENN Motor Company	Canada	Based on the Microcar MC2

==== Chinese-market origin ====
Model	Calendar year produced	Calendar year discontinued	Manufacturer	Marque origin	Notes
Aeolus E30	2015	2016	Dongfeng Motor	China	
Aeolus Yixuan	2020	2021	Dongfeng Motor	China	
Aiways U5	2019	2023	Aiways	China	
Aiways U6	2021	2023	Aiways	China	
Arcfox Lite	2017	2020	BAIC Group	China	
Audi Q2L e-tron	2019	2025	Audi (FAW-Volkswagen)	Germany	
Baojun E100	2017	2021	SAIC-GM-Wuling	China	
Baojun E200	2018	2021	SAIC-GM-Wuling	China	
Baojun KiWi EV	2020	2025	SAIC-GM-Wuling	China	
Beijing EC3	2016	2019	BAIC Group	China	
Beijing EC5/EX	2019	2025	BAIC Group	China	
Beijing EV	2013	2017	BAIC Group	China	
Beijing EH	2016	2019	BAIC Group	China	
Beijing EU	2016	2019	BAIC Group	China	
BJEV EU5/Beijing EU5	2018	2025	BAIC Group	China	
BJEV EU7/Beijing EU7	2019	2025	BAIC Group	China	
Beijing EX3	2018	2022	BAIC Group	China	
Bestune E01	2020	2025	FAW Group	China	
Bestune NAT	2021	2025	FAW Group	China	
Besturn X40 EV400/EV460	2017	2021	FAW Group	China	
BMW i3 (G28)	2022	2026	BMW (BMW Brilliance)	Germany	
Buick Electra E4	2023	2025	General Motors (SAIC-GM)	United States	
Buick Velite 7	2020	2022	General Motors (SAIC-GM)	United States	
BYD D1	2020	2023	BYD Auto	China	
BYD e1	2019	2020	BYD Auto	China	
BYD e3	2019	2022	BYD Auto	China	
BYD e5	2015	2020	BYD Auto	China	
BYD Qin EV	2012	2024	BYD Auto	China	
BYD Qin Pro EV	2018	2021	BYD Auto	China	
BYD Song Max EV	2017	2021	BYD Auto	China	The plug-in hybrid version is still produced
BYD Song Pro EV	2019	2021	BYD Auto	China	The plug-in hybrid version is still produced
BYD S2	2019	2022	BYD Auto	China	
BYD Yuan Pro	2021	2024	BYD Auto	China	
Changan BenBen EV/BenBen E-Star	2015	2023	Changan Automobile	China	
Changan CS15EV/CS15 E-Pro	2019	2023	Changan Automobile	China	
Changan CS55 EV	2020	2022	Changan Automobile	China	
Changan Eulove EV	2015	2018	Changan Automobile	China	
Changhe Beidouxing X5E	2016	2022	Changhe	China	
ChangJiang 360e	2016	2020	ChangJiang EV	China	
ChangJiang A1/A60	2016	2020	ChangJiang EV	China	
ChangJiang A2	2016	2020	ChangJiang EV	China	
ChangJiang A3	2016	2020	ChangJiang EV	China	
ChangJiang C1	2016	2020	ChangJiang EV	China	
ChangJiang C2	2016	2020	ChangJiang EV	China	
ChangJiang eCool	2016	2020	ChangJiang EV	China	
ChangJiang eGlory	2016	2020	ChangJiang EV	China	
ChangJiang E60/E260	2017	2020	ChangJiang EV	China	
ChangJiang M04	2018	2020	ChangJiang EV	China	
Chery Arrizo 5e	2017	2019	Chery	China	
Chery eQ	2014	2022	Chery	China	
Chery eQ5	2020	2023	Chery	China	
Chery QQ3 EV	2010	2020	Chery	China	
Chery Tiggo 3xe	2016	2020	Chery	China	
Chery Tiggo e	2019	2021	Chery	China	
Chery Wujie Pro / Aiqar eQ1 Pro	2022	2023	Chery	China	
Chevrolet Menlo	2020	2026	General Motors (SAIC-GM)	United States	
Ciimo M-NV	2021	2024	Dongfeng Honda	China-Japan	
Ciimo X-NV	2020	2024	Dongfeng Honda	China-Japan	
Ciwei Smile	2018	2022	Ciwei	China	
Denza EV/500	2014	2019	Denza	China	
Denza N7	2023	2026	BYD Auto	China	
Denza X	2019	2021	Denza	China	
Denza Z9	2024	2026	BYD Auto	China	
Dorcen E20	2019	2021	Dorcen	China	
Dorcen G60E	2019	2021	Dorcen	China	
Docan V07	2021	2023	Niutron	China	
Dongfeng Fengon E1	2019	2023	Seres Auto (Hubei)	China	
Dongfeng Fengon E3	2019	2022	Seres Auto (Hubei)	China	
Dongfeng Aeolus EX1	2019	2021	Dongfeng Motor	China	
Dongfeng Skio ER30	2014	2017	Dongfeng Motor	China	
Dongfeng Fengnuo E300 EV	2009	2020	Dongfeng Motor	China	
Dearcc EV10	2017	2018	Enovate	China	
Enovate ME5	2021	2024	Enovate	China	
Enovate ME7	2019	2024	Enovate	China	
Everus EA6	2019	2024	GAC Honda	China-Japan	
Everus VE-1	2019	2024	GAC Honda	China-Japan	
Farizon E5L	2019	2023	Farizon Auto	China	
Ford Territory EV	2019	2021	Ford (JMC-Ford)	United States	
Geely Emgrand GSe	2018	2021	Geely	China	
Geely Emgrand EV	2014	2021	Geely	China	
Geely Emgrand EV Pro	2020	2025	Geely	China	
Geometry C	2020	2024	Geely	China	
Geometry EX3	2021	2022	Geely	China	
Haima Freema EV	2011	2016	Haima Automobile	China	
Haima @3 EV	2016		Haima Automobile	China	
Hanteng X5 EV	2018	2021	Hanteng Autos	China	
Hawtai Shengdafei 2 XEV36	2018	2022	Hawtai	China	
Hawtai Shengdafei 5 XEV260 / XEV480	2015	2022	Hawtai	China	
Hawtai Shengdafei 7 XEV520	2016	2018	Hawtai	China	
Hawtai Lusheng S1 iEV360	2018	2022	Hawtai	China	
Hawtai Lusheng S1 EV160B	2010	2013	Hawtai	China	
Hawtai Lusheng S5 iEV230	2013	2018	Hawtai	China	
Hengchi 5	2022	2023	Hengchi	China	
Higer H4E	2016		Higer	China	
HiPhi X	2020	2024	HiPhi	China	
HiPhi Y	2023	2024	HiPhi	China	
HiPhi Z	2022	2024	HiPhi	China	
Hongqi E-HS3	2019	2023	FAW Group	China	
Honda e:NS1	2022	2025	Honda (Dongfeng Honda)	Japan	
Honda e:NP1	2022	2025	Honda (GAC Honda)	Japan	
Honda e:NP2	2024	2026	Honda (GAC Honda)	Japan	
Hycan 007	2020	2025	Hycan	China	
Hycan Z03	2021	2025	Hycan	China	
Hycan A06	2022	2025	Hycan	China	
Hycan V09	2023	2025	Hycan	China	
Hyundai Mistra EV	2021	2022	Hyundai	South Korea	
Hyundai Lafesta EV	2021	2022	Hyundai	South Korea	
JAC iEVS4	2019	2022	JAC Motors	China	
JAC iEV4	2011	2018	JAC Motors	China	
JAC iEV7S	2016	2023	JAC Motors	China	
JAC iEV6E	2016	2021	JAC Motors	China	
Jetour X70S EV	2019	2021	Chery	China	
Ji Yue 01	2023	2024	Jidu Auto	China	
Ji Yue 07	2024	2024	Jidu Auto	China	
JMC E-Lushun	2022	2025	JMC	China	
JMC Yuhu EV	2019		JMC	China	
Kandi K23	2018	2021	Kandi	China	
Kandi K27	2018	2021	Kandi	China	
Kia KX3 EV	2018	2019	Kia	South Korea	
Kia K3 EV	2021		Kia	South Korea	
Leahead i1	2015	2016	GAC Toyota	China-Japan	
Leahead iX4	2018	2019	GAC Toyota	China-Japan	
Leahead iA5	2019	2024	GAC Toyota	China-Japan	
Leapmotor C01	2022	2025	Leapmotor	China	
Leapmotor S01	2019	2021	Leapmotor	China	
Leopaard CS3	2019	2020	GAC Group	China	
Leopaard CS9 EV	2017	2020	GAC Group	China	
Letin Mengo	2020	2023	Levdeo	China	
Levdeo D30	2014	2023	Levdeo	China	
Levdeo D50	2014	2023	Levdeo	China	
Levdeo D60/E60	2015	2023	Levdeo	China	
Levdeo D70	2015	2023	Levdeo	China	
Levdeo i3	2019	2023	Levdeo	China	
Levdeo i5	2019	2023	Levdeo	China	
Levdeo i9	2020	2023	Levdeo	China	
Levdeo V60	2015	2023	Levdeo	China	
Levdeo S50	2015	2023	Levdeo	China	
Lifan 820EV	2015	2020	Lifan Group	China	
Maple 30X	2020	2021	Geely Auto	China	
Maple 60S	2021	2025	Geely	China	
Maple 80V	2020	2025	Geely	China	
Maxus Euniq 5	2019	2023	SAIC Motor	China	
Maxus Euniq 6	2021	2023	SAIC Motor	China	
Maxus Mifa 5	2023	2025	SAIC Motor	China	
Maxus Mifa 6	2023	2024	SAIC Motor	China	
Maxus Euniq 7	2020	2023	SAIC Motor	China	
Mazda CX-30 EV	2021	2023	Mazda	Japan	
Mecha Dragon	2022	2024	Great Wall Motor	China	
Mitsubishi Eupheme EV	2019	2020	Mitsubishi Motors	Japan	
Mitsubishi Airtrek	2021	2023	Mitsubishi Motors	Japan	
Neta Aya / V	2020	2026	Hozon Auto	China	
Neta GT	2023	2024	Hozon Auto	China	
Neta L	2024		Hozon Auto	China	
Neta N01	2018	2020	Hozon Auto	China	Over 18,000 units were sold.
Neta S	2022	2024	Hozon Auto	China	
Neta U / X	2020	2026	Hozon Auto	China	
Nio EP9	2016	2019	Nio	China	
Nissan Sylphy Z.E.	2018	2020	Nissan (Dongfeng Nissan)	Japan	
Niutron NV	2021	2023	Niutron	China	
Ora iQ	2018	2020	Great Wall Motor	China	10,300 units were sold in the first full year of sales, 2019.
Ora Black Cat	2019	2022	Great Wall Motor	China	
Ora White Cat	2020	2022	Great Wall Motor	China	
Ora Cherry Cat	2021	2023	Great Wall Motor	China	
Oshan A600 EV	2019	2022	Changan Automobile	China	
Qiantu K50	2017	2020	Qiantu Motor	China	
Ranz E50	2015	2016	FAW Toyota	China-Japan	
Renault City K-ZE	2019	2020	Renault	France	
Rising Auto ER6	2020	2022	SAIC Motor	China	
Roewe Clever	2020	2025	SAIC Motor	China	
Roewe E50	2012	2016	SAIC Motor	China	
Roewe ERX5	2019		SAIC Motor	China	
Roewe Ei6	2016	2020	SAIC Motor	China	
Roewe Marvel X / Rising Marvel R / MG Marvel R	2018	2026	SAIC Motor	China	
Ruixiang C5 EV	2017	2021	BAIC Ruixiang	China	
Ruixiang Hoen O2	2022		BAIC Ruixiang	China	
Sehol E20X	2018	2022	JAC Motors	China	
Sinogold GM3	2017	2023	Sinogold	China	
Sinogold Junxing	2022	2024	Sinogold	China	
Singulato iS6	2019	2023	Singulato	China	
SiTech MEV	2020		SiTech	China	
SiTech AEVS	2018	2020	SiTech	China	
Trumpchi GE3	2017	2020	GAC Group	China	
Trumpchi GS4 EV	2016	2019	GAC Group	China	
Toyota C-HR EV	2020	2023	GAC Toyota	China-Japan	
Toyota IZOA EV	2020	2023	FAW Toyota	China-Japan	
Venucia e30	2015	2023	Dongfeng Nissan	China	
Volkswagen e-Lavida	2019		Volkswagen	Germany	
Weltmeister E5	2021	2023	Weltmeister	China	
Weltmeister EX5	2018	2023	Weltmeister	China	
Weltmeister EX6	2020	2023	Weltmeister	China	
Weltmeister W6	2021	2023	Weltmeister	China	
Weltmeister M7	2022		Weltmeister	China	
Wuling E10 EV	2023	2025	SAIC-GM-Wuling	China	
Wuling Nano EV	2021	2025	SAIC-GM-Wuling	China	
XPeng G3 / Identity X	2018	2023	XPeng	China	
XPeng P5	2021	2024	XPeng	China	
Yema EC30	2015	2023	Yema Auto	China	
Yema EC60	2019	2023	Yema Auto	China	
Yema EC70	2015	2019	Yema Auto	China	
Yuanhang H8	2023	2024	Dayun Group	China	
Yuanhang H9	2024		Dayun Group	China	
Yuanhang Y6	2023	2024	Dayun Group	China	
Yuanhang Y7	2023	2024	Dayun Group	China	
Yudo π1	2018	2023	Yudo Auto	China	
Yudo π3	2018	2022	Yudo Auto	China	
Yulu EV2	2017	2018	Dongfeng Yulon	China-Taiwan	
Zedriv GC1	2020	2022	Zedriv	China	
Zedriv GC2	2020		Zedriv	China	
Zedriv GX5	2020		Zedriv	China	
Zedriv GT3	2020		Zedriv	China	
Zhidou D1	2014	2020	Zhidou	China	
Zhidou D2	2014	2020	Zhidou	China	
Zhidou D3	2017	2019	Zhidou	China	
Zinoro 1E	2013	2015	BMW Brilliance	China-Germany	
Zotye Cloud 100	2014	2021	Zotye	China	
Zotye E200	2016	2020	Zotye	China	Sales ended in early 2020.
Zotye E20	2014	2020	Zotye	China	
Zotye E30	2016	2019	Zotye	China	
Zotye E300	2008	2013	Zotye	China	
Zotye Z500 EV	2017	2019	Zotye	China	

=== Pre-1995 ===
Model	Calendar year produced	Calendar year discontinued	Manufacturer	Marque origin	Notes
AM General Jeep DJ-5E Electruck	1974	1974	AM General	United States	Sold to United States Postal Service and Canada Post.
Baker Electric	1899	1914	Baker Motor Vehicle	United States	
CitiCar	1974	1977	Sebring-Vanguard	United States	Microcar, a total of 4,444 units were produced up to 1979.
Citroën C15	1990	1994	PSA Group	France	
Citroën C25	1990	1994	PSA Group	France	Also named Fiat Ducato Elettra, Peugeot J5 Electrique
Detroit Electric	1907	1939	Anderson Electric Car Company	United States	Between 1907 and 1939 a total of 13,000 electric cars were built.
Enfield 8000	1973	1973	Enfield Automotive	United Kingdom	120 cars were built in total, of which 65 were used by the Electricity Council.
Fiat Panda Elettra	1990	1998	Fiat	Italy	
Henney Kilowatt	1959	1960	Henney Motor Company	United States	
Scottish Aviation Scamp	1964	1966	Scottish Aviation	United Kingdom	Produced for the Central Electricity Generating Board. 13 prototypes only.
Sinclair C5	1985	1985	Sinclair Vehicles	United Kingdom	Recumbent tricycle. Out of 14,000 C5s made, only 5,000 were sold.
Studebaker Electric	1902	1912	Studebaker	United States	Produced from 1902 to 1912 in South Bend, Indiana
VAZ-111E	1989	1998	AvtoVAZ	Soviet Union	
Zagato Zele	1974	1976	Zagato	Italy	Made by the Italian design firm Zagato. About 500 vehicles were made.

=== Demonstration fleets or prototypes ===
Model	Calendar year produced	Calendar year discontinued	Manufacturer	Marque origin	Notes
AC Propulsion tzero	1997	1997	AC Propulsion	United States	Two-seat sportster prototype, four produced.
Acura RSX	2026		Acura	Japan	Supposed to go into production with prototype model already being shown to the public, but the company in March 2026 and cancelled the entire vehicle.
Afeela 1	2026		Sony Honda Mobility	Japan	Supposed to go into production with prototype model already being shown to the public, but the company cancelled the vehicle in March 2026.
Arrival Bus	2022		Arrival	United Kingdom	Production of the bus was planned for the end of 2022, but development was paused in August 2022. The company went into administration in 2024.
Autobianchi Y10 Electrica	1989	1990			
BMW 1602 Elektro-Antrieb	1972		BMW	Germany	BMW's first electric vehicle prototype, based on the production 1602 model. Unveiled during the 1972 Olympics and used to carry VIPs.
BMW ActiveE	2012	2012	BMW	Germany	Field testing in the U.S. began in January 2012, after the Mini E trial ended. Available only in select markets.
Byton M-Byte	2018	2021	Byton	China	Supposed to go into production with concept model already being shown to the public, but the company went bankrupt in 2021 and cancelled the entire vehicle.
Byton K-Byte	2018		Byton	China	Supposed to go into concept model already being shown to the public, but the company went bankrupt in 2021 and cancelled the entire vehicle.
Canoo MPDV	2020		Canoo	United States	The company went bankrupt in 2025 and cancelled the entire vehicle.
Elcat Electric Vehicles		2002	Elcat Automotive	Finland	
Electrorides ZeroTruck	2008		Electrorides	United States	Based on an Isuzu N-series platform, retrofitted with a UQM Technologies electric motor.
Electrosport	1971	1974	Electric Fuel Propulsion Company	United States	
EMC E36	2011	2011	EnVision Motor Company	United States	Rebadged Dacia Logan I
Fisker Pear	2024		Fisker Inc.	United States	Supposed to go into production with concept model already being shown to the public, but the company went bankrupt in October 2024 and cancelled the entire vehicle.
Fisker Alaska / Kayak	2024		Fisker Inc.	United States	Supposed to go into production with concept model already being shown to the public, but the company went bankrupt in October 2024 and cancelled the entire vehicle.
Fisker Ronin	2024		Fisker Inc.	United States	Supposed to go into production with concept model already being shown to the public, but the company went bankrupt in October 2024 and cancelled the entire vehicle.
Ford SUV (electric)	2024		Ford	United States	Supposed to go into production, but the company in August 2024 and cancelled the entire vehicle.
Hyundai BlueOn	2009	2010	Hyundai	South Korea	Field testing with 30 units began in South Korea by late 2010, production was planned.
Honda 0 Saloon	2026		Honda	Japan	Supposed to go into production with concept model already being shown to the public, but the company in March 2026 and cancelled the entire vehicle.
Honda 0 SUV	2026		Honda	Japan	Supposed to go into production with prototype model already being shown to the public, but the company in March 2026 and cancelled the entire vehicle.
Indi One	2022		Indi EV	United States	Supposed to go into production with prototype model already being shown to the public, but the company went bankrupt in October 2023 and cancelled the entire vehicle.
Jaguar XJ (electric)	2020		Jaguar Land Rover	United Kingdom	Supposed to go into production, but the company in February 2021 and cancelled the entire vehicle.
Iveco Daily	2010		Iveco	Italy	
Lada Ellada	2011		AvtoVAZ	Russia	
Mercedes-Benz Vito 108E	1996		Daimler AG	Germany	
Mini E	2009	2010	BMW	United Kingdom	Built for field trials.
Miles ZX40ST	2007		Miles Electric Vehicles	United States	
Mitsubishi Fuso eCanter	2016		Mitsubishi Fuso	Japan	
Nissan Altra EV	1998	2002	Nissan	Japan	Only about 200 vehicles were ever produced mainly for fleet.
Nissan Hypermini	1999	2001	Nissan	Japan	Only about 219 vehicles were ever produced mainly for Japanese market.
Optimal Energy Joule	2008	2012	Optimal Energy	South Africa	A concept car that was never released commercially; development ceased in April 2012.
Ram 1500 REV (All-Electric)	2023		Ram Trucks	United States	Supposed to go into production with concept model already being shown to the public, but the company in September 2025 and cancelled the entire vehicle.
Tango	2005		Commuter Cars	United States	
Tata Indica Vista EV	2008	2011	Tata Motors	India	
Volkswagen Golf blue-e-motion	2011	2012	Volkswagen	Germany	
Volkswagen Golf CITYStromer			Volkswagen	Germany	
Volkswagen Jetta CITYStromer			Volkswagen	Germany	
Wrightspeed X1	2006		Wrightspeed	United States	An Ariel Atom sports car modified to use an all-electric powertrain. Production has been cancelled.
Zytek Lotus Elise	1998	2003	Lotus Cars and Zytek	United Kingdom	

== Vehicles planned for production ==
=== Outside the Chinese market ===
Model	Calendar year
Aptera	2026
Aston Martin Lagonda All-Terrain	2026
Audi A2 e-tron	2026
Avinya X	2027
Bentley Torcal	2026
BMW iX4	2026
BMW iX5	2026
Chrysler Arrow Cross/Arrow	TBA
Citroën 2CV	2028
City Transformer CT-1	2025
City Transformer urban CT-2	2025
Comsove BUTIQ	2025
Comsove ATIQ	2025
DeLorean Alpha5	2025
EdisonFuture EF1-T	2025
Fiat Grizzly	2026
Fiat Koala	2028
Ford Fathom	2027
Genesis GV90	2026
Honda Alpha	2027
Jaguar Type 01	2027
Kia PV7	2027
Lancia Gamma	2026
Lexus TZ	2026
Maserati Quattroporte EV	2028
Mercedes-AMG GT 4-Door Coupé	2026
Mercedes-AMG GT SUV	2027
Mitsubishi ASX VR-e	2026
Nissan Juke EV	2026
Nissan Pixo EV	2026
Polestar 2	2027
Polestar 5	2026
Polestar 6	2029
Polestar 7	2028
Porsche 718 EV	2026
Range Rover GT	2027
Rivian R3	TBA
Renault FlexEVan	2026
Scout Terra	2027
Scout Traveler	2027
Slate	2026
Smart #2	2026
Subaru Getaway	2026
Telo MT1	2026
Tesla Roadster (second generation)	2028
Toyota Highlander BEV	2026
Volkswagen ID. Tiguan	2026

=== Chinese-market origin ===
Model	Calendar year
MG2 EV	2027
SAIC Z9	2026
Volkswagen ID. Aura L5	2026
Yangwang Altior	2026

== Motorcycles and scooters ==
- Ather Energy
- Energica Motor Company
- Gogoro
- KTM Freeride
- LiveWire
- Maeving
- Niu Technologies
- Ola Electric
- Segway
- Sur-Ron
- Yadea
- Zero Motorcycles

== Buses ==
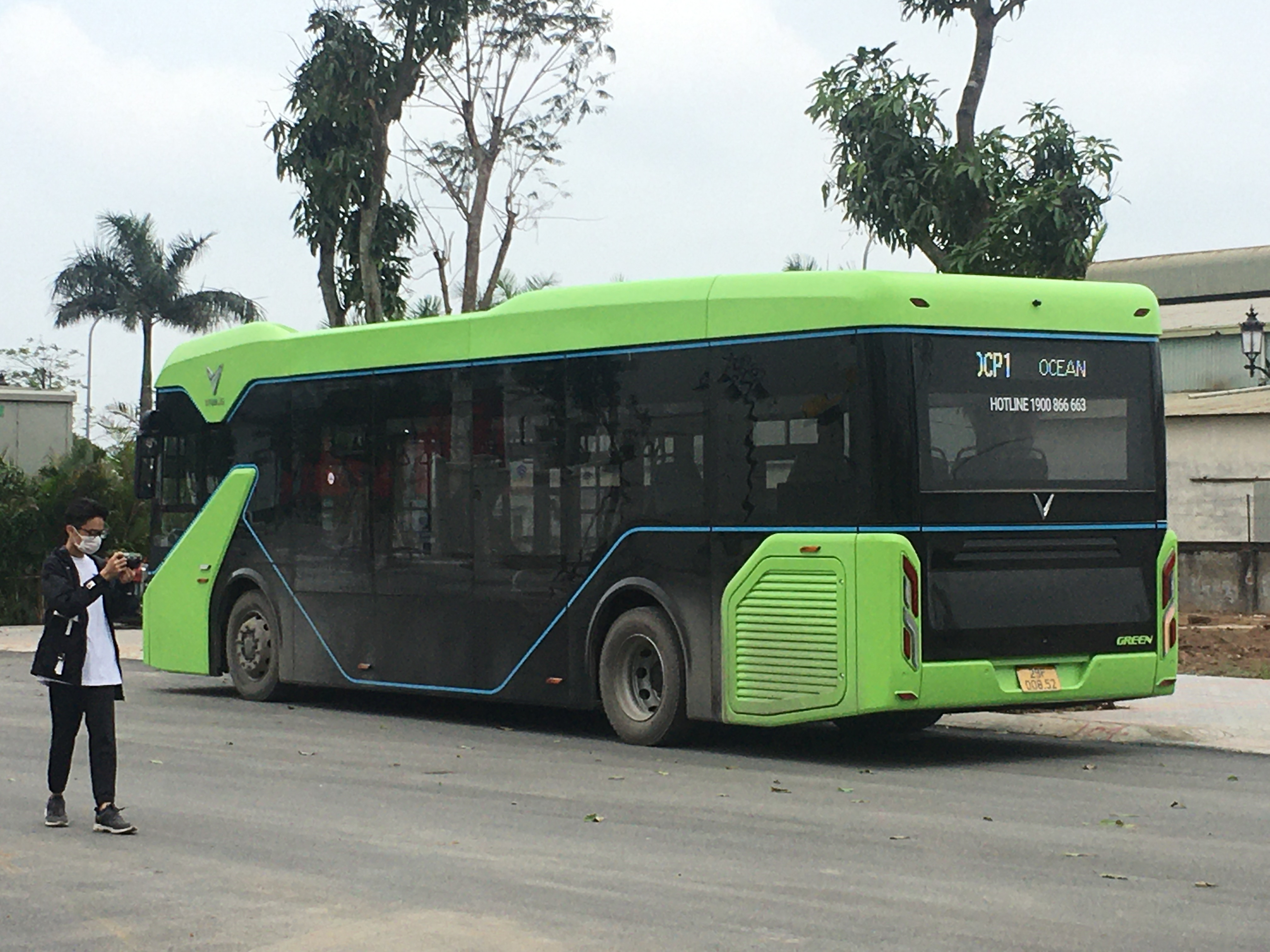
VinBus made by VinFast from Vietnam

- Alexander Dennis Enviro100EV
- Alexander Dennis Enviro200EV
- Alexander Dennis Enviro400EV
- Alexander Dennis Enviro500EV
- BYD C9
- BYD K9
- Foxtron Model T
- Goldstone eBuzz K7
- Higer Steed EV
- MG iEV12
- Optare Metrocity EV
- Optare Metrodecker EV
- Optare Versa EV
- Oreos 2X (PVI)
- Oreos 4X (PVI)
- Proterra Catalyst
- Proterra EcoRide
- Proterra ZX5
- VinBus
- Volvo BZL
- Wright GB Kite
- Yutong E10
- Yutong TCe12
- Yutong U11DD

== Trucks ==
- Tesla Semi, all-electric class 8 truck.
- FR8, EVage Motors showcases 1-tonne electric delivery truck

== Three-wheelers ==
=== Passenger vehicles ===
Arcimoto

- FUV

Aptera Motors

- Aptera (solar electric vehicle)

Champion polyplast

- SAARTHI SHAVAK E AUTO

Mahindra Electric Mobility Limited

- Treo

Omega Seiki Mobility

- STREAM

Piaggio Vehicles Private Limited

- Ape' E-City

=== Cargo vehicles ===
Altigreen Propulsion Labs Pvt Ltd

- NEEV
- NEEV HD
- NEEV LR

Keto Motors Private Limited

- BULKe
- BULKe plus 2.0

Kinetic Green Energy & Power Solutions Ltd

- KINETIC SAFAR STAR – 400
- KINETIC SAFAR JUMBO – PICKUP

Lohia Auto Industries

- Humsafar iB

Mahindra Electric Mobility Limited

- Treo Zor
- Treo Zor FB
- Treo Zor DV

Omega Seiki Mobility

- RAGE+
- SUN-RI

=== Rickshaws ===
Kinetic Green Energy & Power Solutions Ltd

- KINETIC SAFAR SMART
- Kinetic SAFAR SMART LFP

Mahindra Electric Mobility Limited

- Treo Yaari HRT
- Treo Yaari SFT

Omega Seiki Mobility

- RIDE

== See also ==
- Battery electric multiple unit
- Battery electric vehicle
- Electric aircraft
- Electric boat
- Electric fire engine
- Electric motorcycles and scooters
- Electric vehicle conversion
- Plug-in electric vehicle
- Plug-in hybrid
