= Electrorides =

Electrorides Inc is an electric vehicle maker, based in Laguna Niguel, California. The company founder and CEO is Tedd Abramson. Electrorides Zerotruck debuted at the Alternative Fuels & Vehicles National Conference and Expo in Las Vegas May 11–14, 2008.

== Products ==
The Electrorides ZeroTruck is an all-electric truck. It is based on an Isuzu N-series platform, retrofitted with an advanced technology brushless DC electric motor and a lithium-polymer battery 65 kW pack US built. It is a 12,000–16,000-pound (5,400–7,300 kg) GVWR medium duty truck with a 75-mile (121 km) range. The company plans to begin taking orders for the ZeroTruck in January 2009 and to make its first deliveries in June 2009 and recently delivered a ZeroTruck to the City of Santa Monica for their Water Services Dept. (see photo). While most alternative fuel solutions for trucks are hybrids, the ZeroTruck is fully electric.

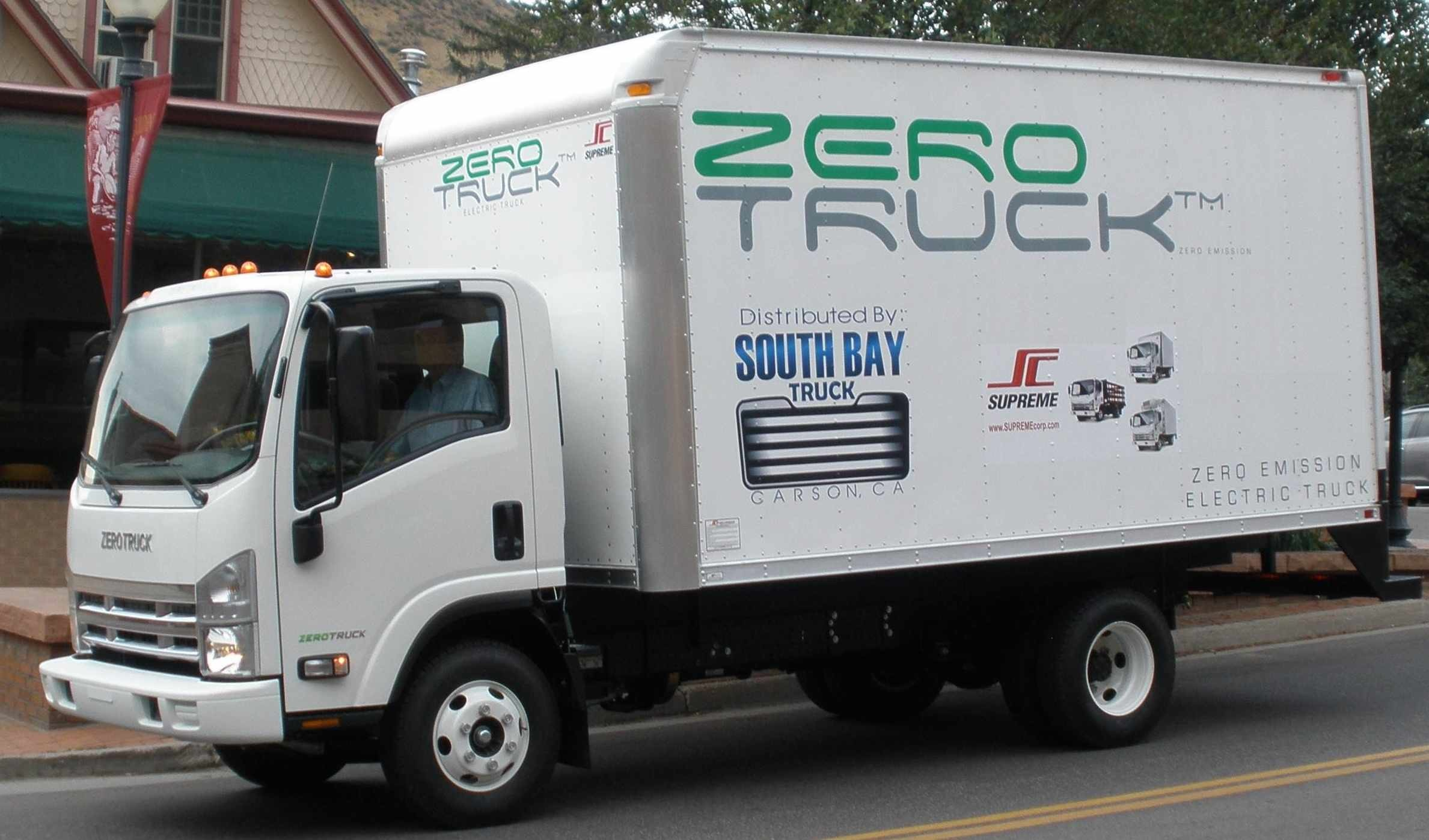
ZeroTruck with Supreme dry freight body configuration

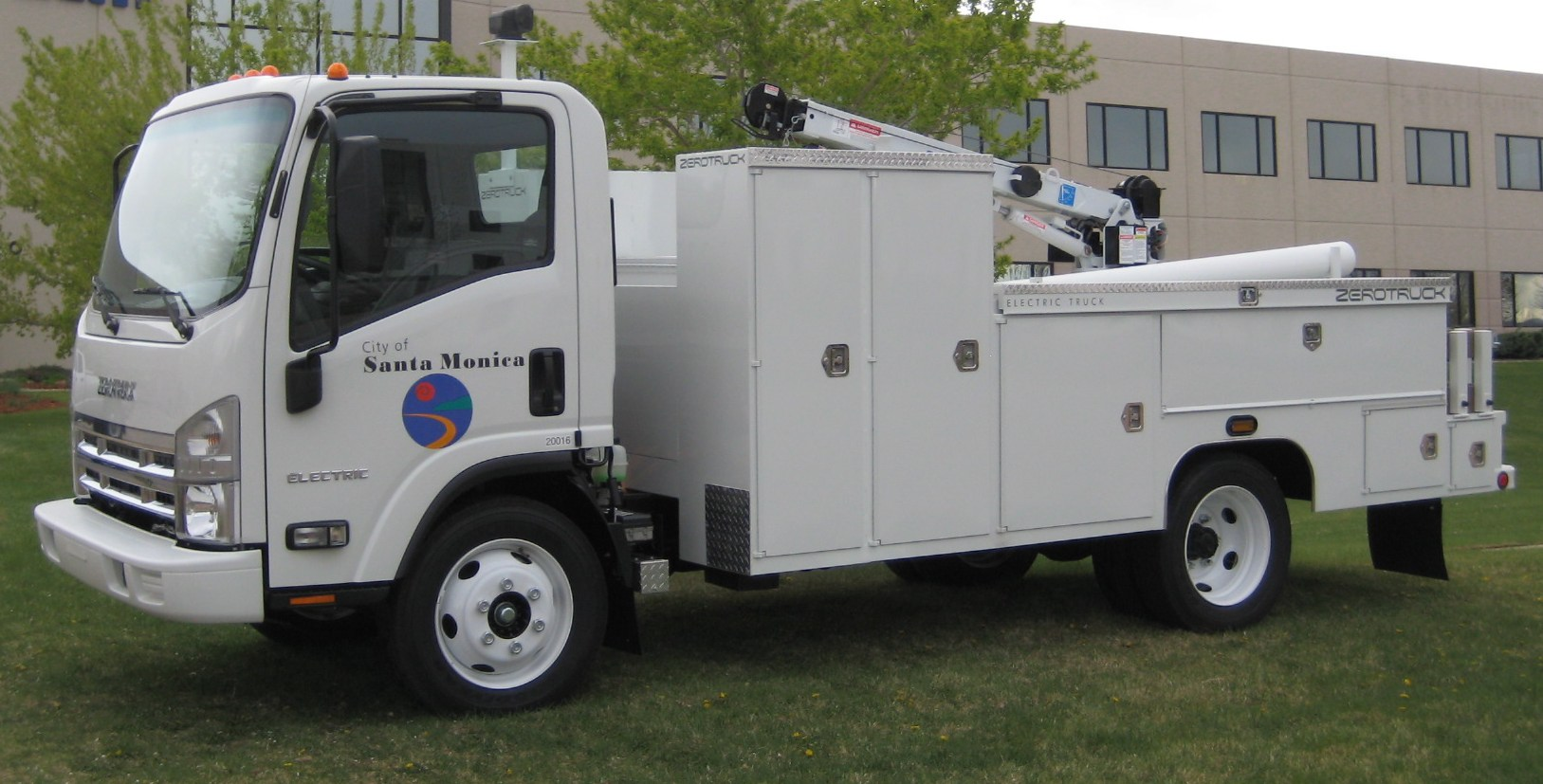
ZeroTruck with Scelzi utility body for the City of Santa Monica, CA 2010

== See also ==
- List of production battery electric vehicles
