= Changan Ruixing M80 =

Chinese automobile

Ruixing M80
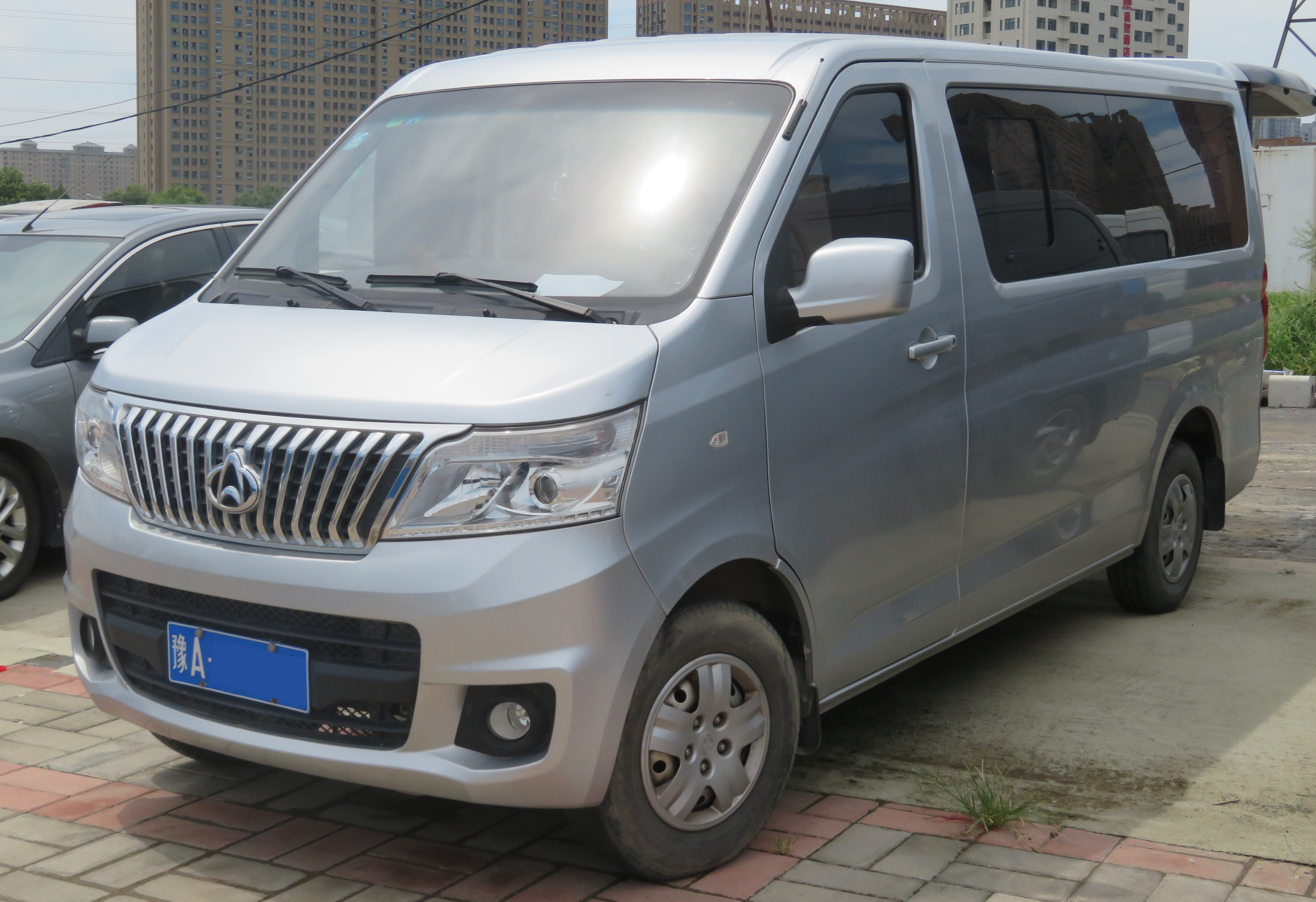
- Ruixing M80

Overview
- Manufacturer: Changan Automobile
- Also called: Changan G10; Ruixing EM80 (Electric version)
- Production: 2013–present
- Model years: 2013–present

Body and chassis
- Class: MPV
- Body style: 5-door wagon
- Layout: Front-engine, front-wheel-drive

Powertrain
- Engine: 2.0 L I4 (turbo petrol)
- Transmission: 5-speed manual

Dimensions
- Wheelbase: 3,050 mm (120.1 in)
- Length: 4,805 mm (189.2 in)
- Width: 1,715 mm (67.5 in)
- Height: 1,990 mm (78.3 in)

The Changan Ruixing M80 is a MPV produced by Changan Automobile from 2013 under the Kaicene sub-brand. The official English name of Ruixing was later changed to Raesor. A smaller variant was launched in 2019 called the M60, positioned below the M80.

== Overview ==
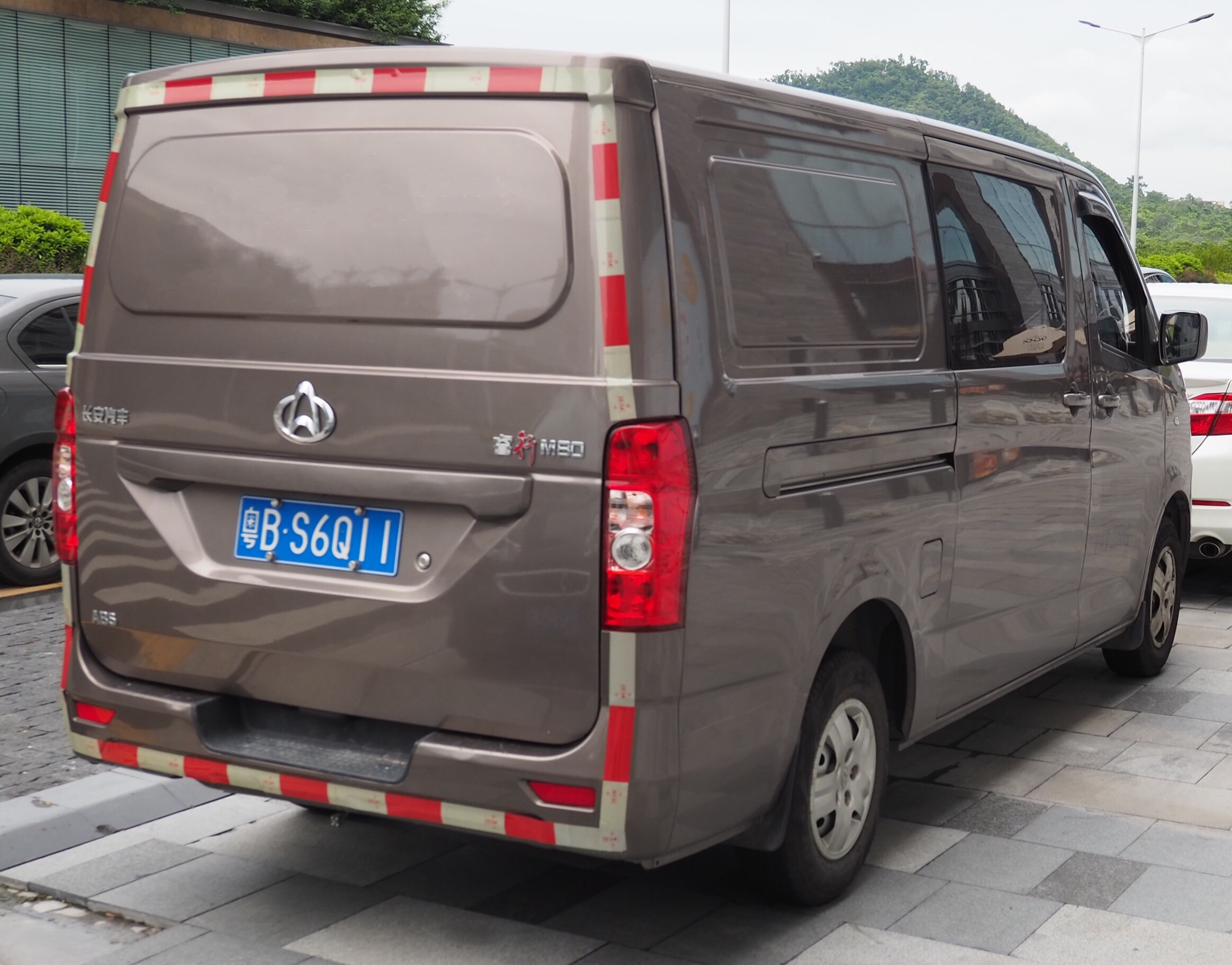
Ruixing M80 rear

The Ruixing M80 debuted in October 2013 and was launched on the Chinese auto market with prices ranging from 57,200 yuan to 71,100 yuan for the 2018 model year.

The Ruixing M80 is available in 7-seater, 9-seater and a 10-seater configurations. The power of the Ruixing M80 comes from a Mitsubishi-sourced 4G15S 1.5 liter four-cylinder petrol engine producing 74.8 kW and 126.6 nm of torque, mated to a 5-speed manual gearbox.

The Ruixing M80 is manufactured by Chana, Changan's commercial division, also later known as Oushang. As of 2019, the Ruixing van products has been excluded from Oushang's official website and was sold separately from a different channel.

== Ruixing EM80 ==
The Ruixing EM80 is the electric version of the Ruixing M80 built on the same platform as the M80. The EM80 is equipped with a 48.4kWh battery and a rear located electric motor capable of producing 60 kW and 200 nm of torque. Prices of the Ruixing EM80 ranges from 96,800 yuan to 98,800 yuan.

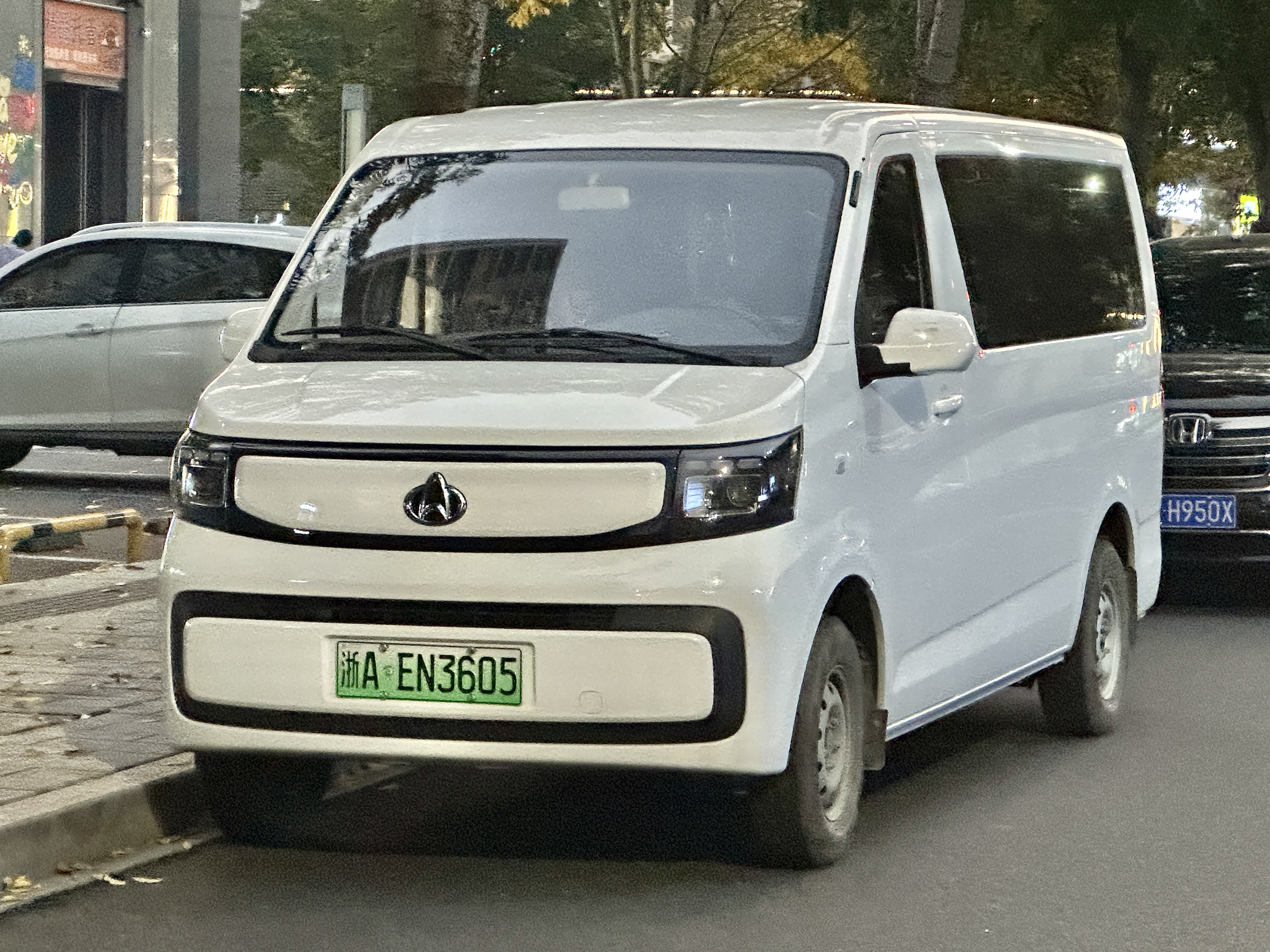
Ruixing EM80 II

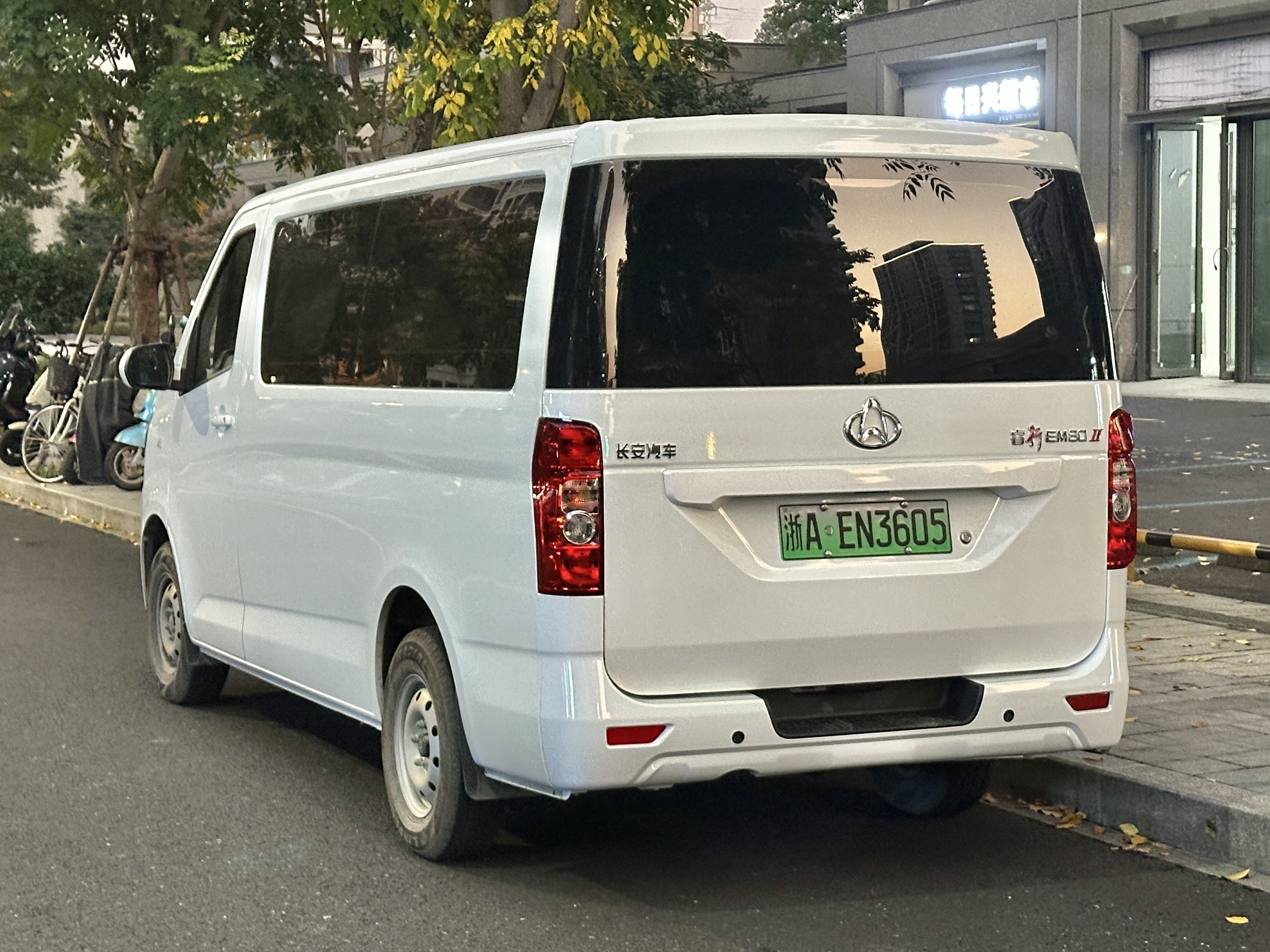
Ruixing EM80 II rear

== Ruixing M60 ==
Ruixing M60
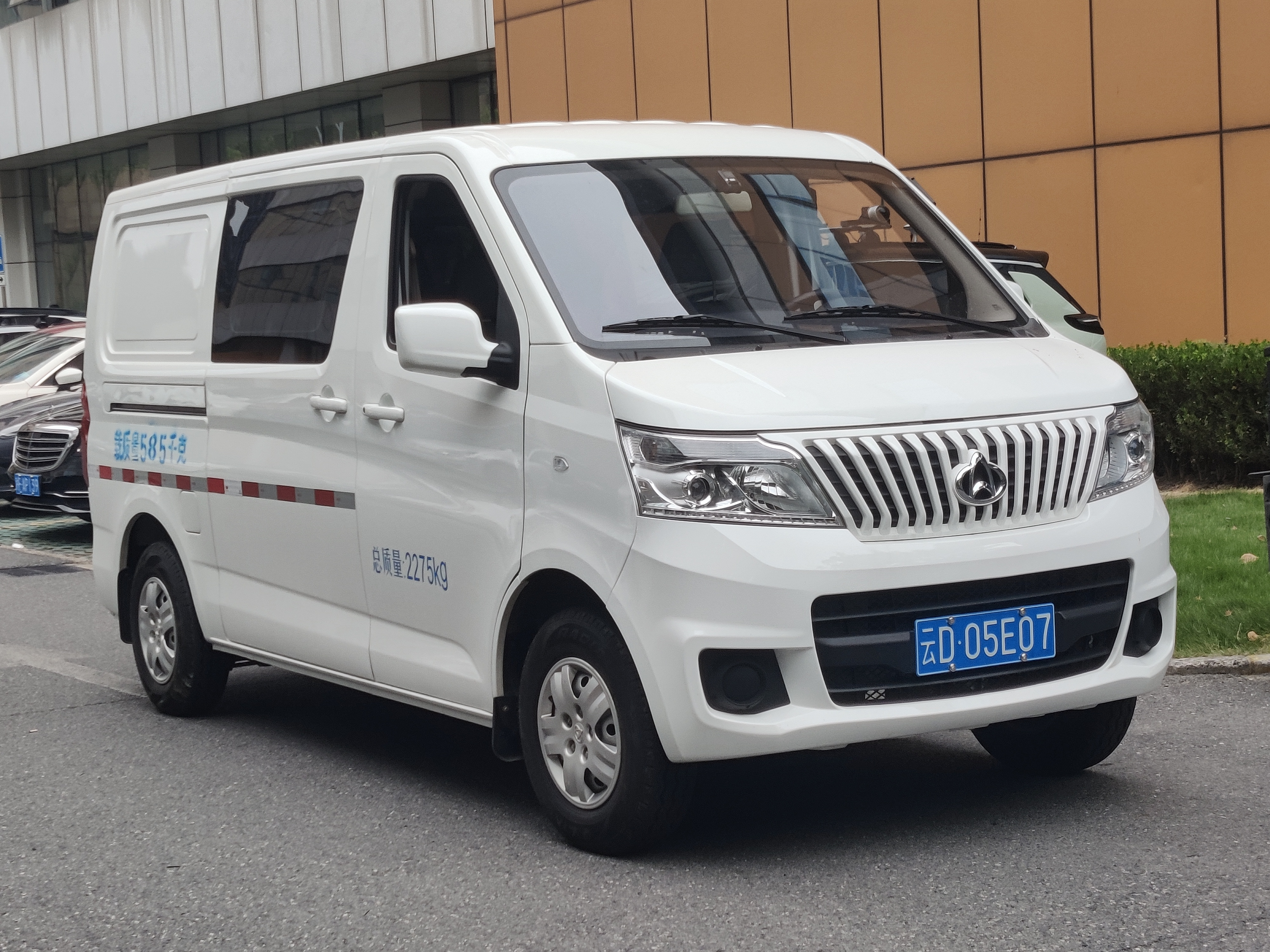
- Ruixing M60

Overview
- Manufacturer: Changan Automobile
- Also called: Teraco Tera-V6/V8 (Vietnam)
- Production: 2019–present
- Model years: 2019–present

Body and chassis
- Class: MPV
- Body style: 5-door wagon
- Layout: Front-engine, front-wheel-drive

Powertrain
- Engine: 1.5 L I4 petrol)
- Transmission: 5-speed manual

Dimensions
- Wheelbase: 3,050 mm (120.1 in)
- Length: 4,498 mm (177.1 in) (Passenger); 4,530 mm (178.3 in) (Cargo)
- Width: 1,680 mm (66.1 in) (Passenger); 1,715 mm (67.5 in) (Cargo)
- Height: 1,990 mm (78.3 in) (Passenger); 1,990 mm (78.3 in) (Cargo)

The Ruixing M60 is the smaller version of the M80, and was officially listed in early June 2019. The positioning is lower than the Ruixing M80 and the main market is city logistics and rural passenger transport.

=== Overview ===
The Ruixing M60 offers for four models, including 7-seat and 6-seat passenger variants, as well as 2-seat and 5-seat cargo variants. The four models offered are all powered by 1.5 liter engines.

The Ruixing M60 is powered by a 1.5 liter engine code-named 4G15S, with a maximum power output of 80 kW (107 hp) and a peak torque of 131N·m which meets the CN-5 emission standards, or a 1.5 liter engine code-named DAM15KR, with a maximum power output of 85 kW (114 hp), the peak torque is 150 N·m to meet CN-6 emission standards.

In terms of transmission, the 1.5 liter engines of the Ruixing M60 is mated with a 5-speed manual transmission and adopts a mid-mounted rear drive layout. In terms of chassis, Ruixing M60 comes standard with electric power steering, front disc brakes and rear drum brakes, ABS+EBD, front McPherson independent and rear five-plate spring-type non-independent suspension.

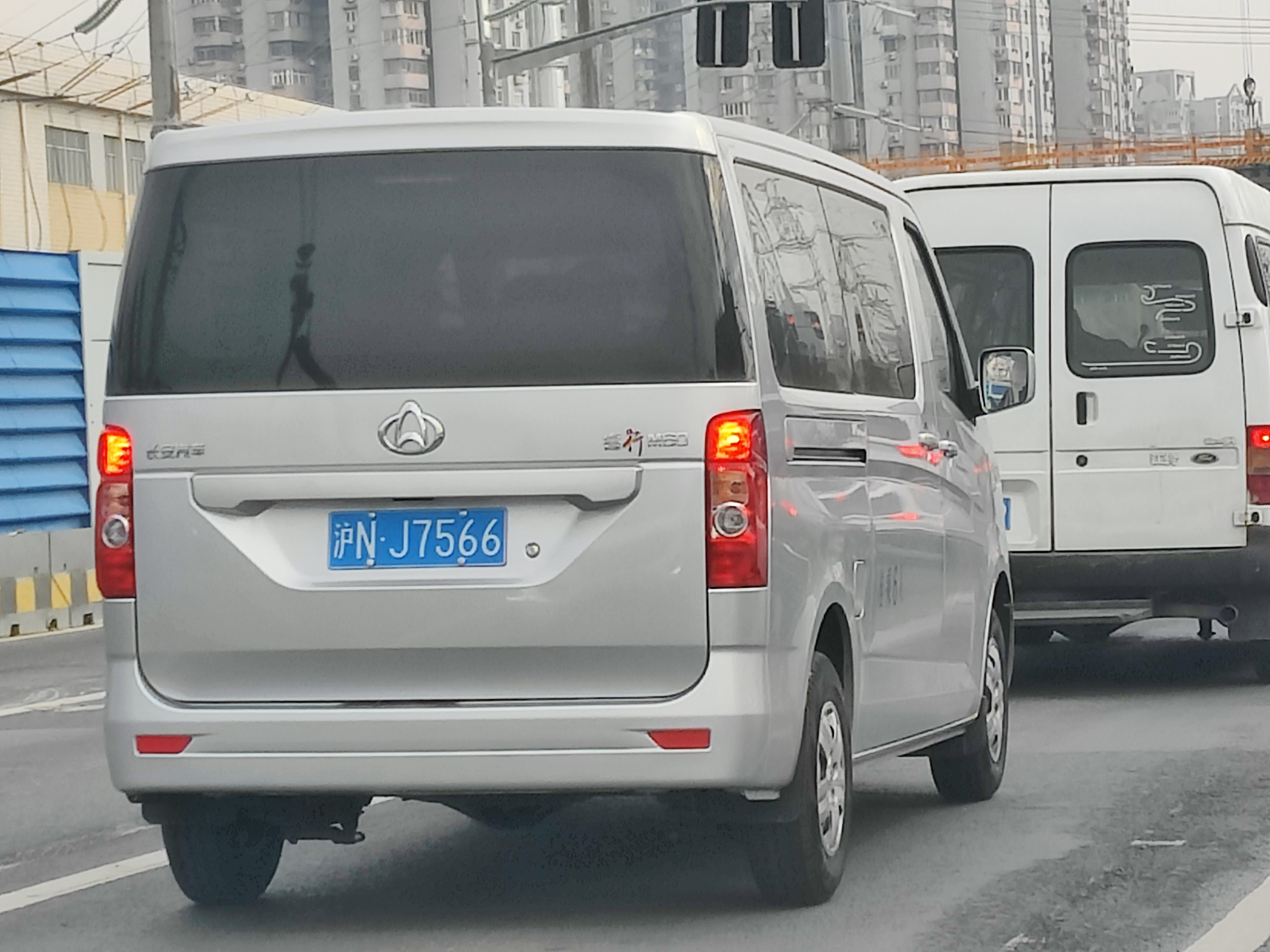
Ruixing M60 (rear)

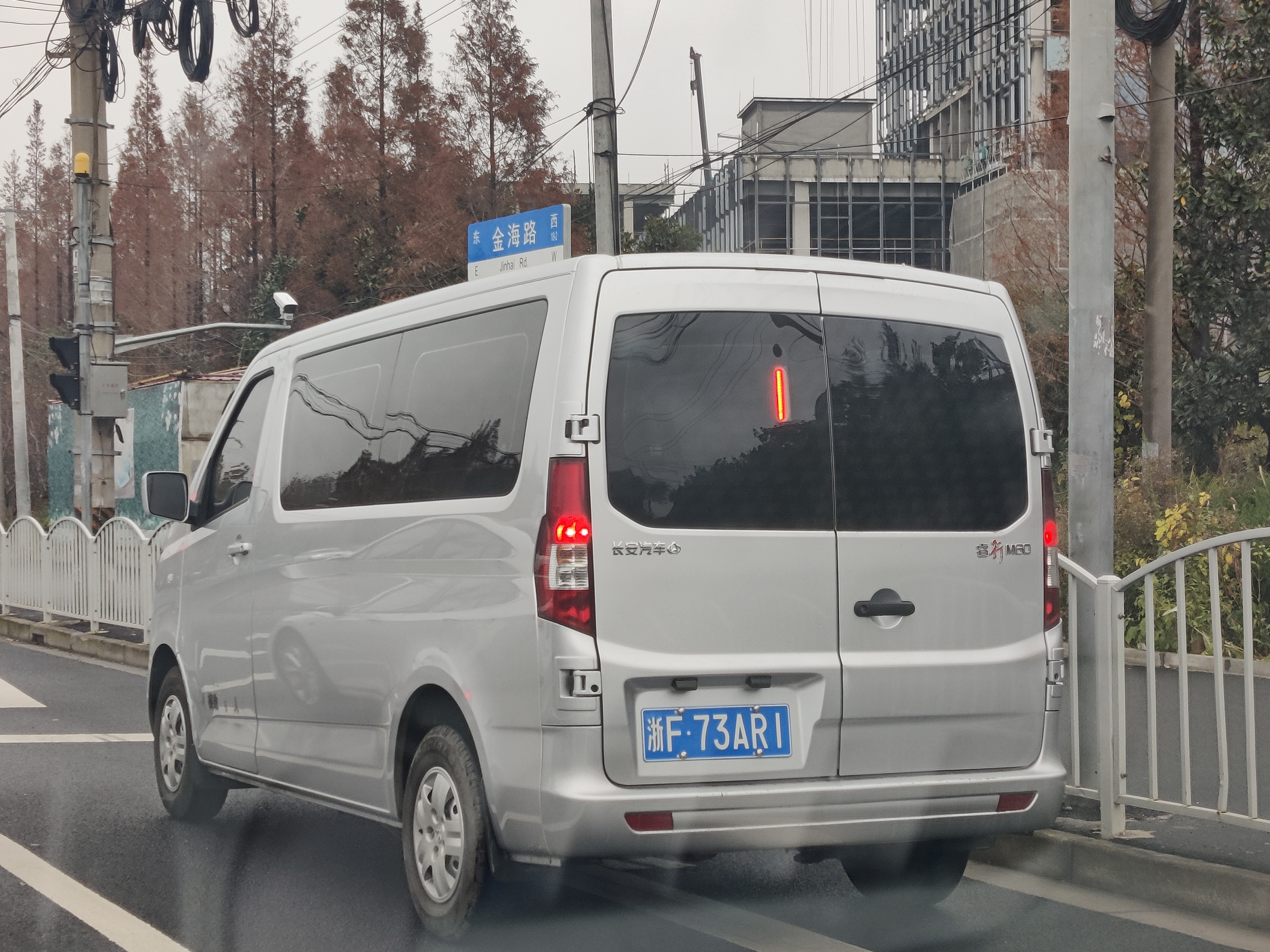
Ruixing M60 with barn doors(rear)
