= Weiwang 407 EV =

Electric 4/5 door van

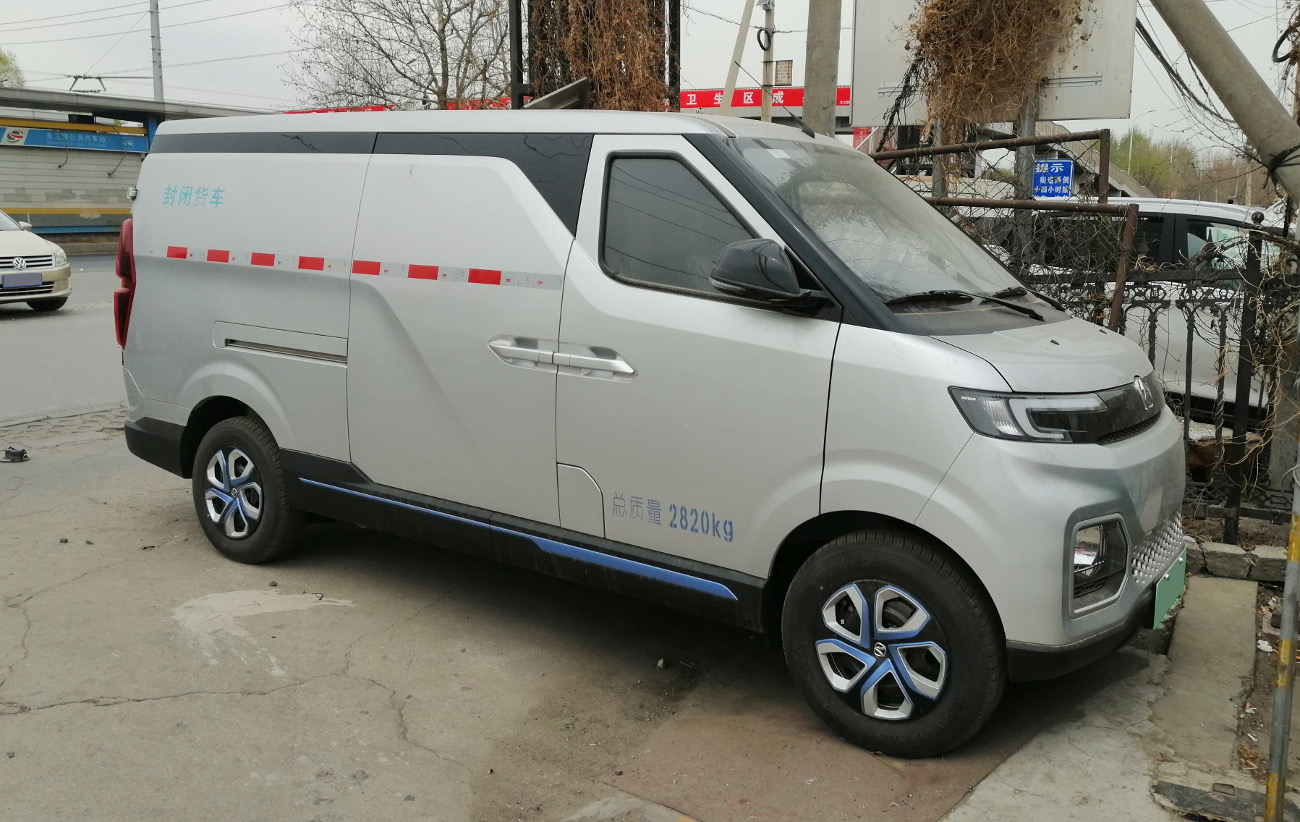
- Weiwang 407 EV photographed in Beijing, China.

Overview
- Manufacturer: BAIC Group
- Also called: BAIC EV5
- Production: 2018—present
- Model years: 2018—present
- Assembly: China

Body and chassis
- Class: Light commercial vehicle
- Body style: 4/5-door van
- Layout: Dual motors, four-wheel drive

Powertrain
- Electric motor: 2x1YM AC Permanent magnet synchronous electric motor
- Power output: 62 kW (83 hp; 84 PS) (front); 30 kW (41 hp; 42 PS) (rear); 92 kW (124 hp; 126 PS) (combined)
- Transmission: 1-speed direct-drive
- Battery: Li-ion battery: 43.5 kWh
- Electric range: 220 km (138 mi)

Dimensions
- Wheelbase: 2,920 mm (115.0 in)
- Length: 4,500 mm (177.2 in)
- Width: 1,650 mm (65.0 in)
- Height: 1,940 mm (76.4 in)
- Curb weight: 1600 kg (3527 lbs)

The Weiwang 407 EV is an electric light commercial 4/5-door van designed and produced by the Chinese automaker BAIC Group under the Weiwang brand since June 2018.

== Overview ==
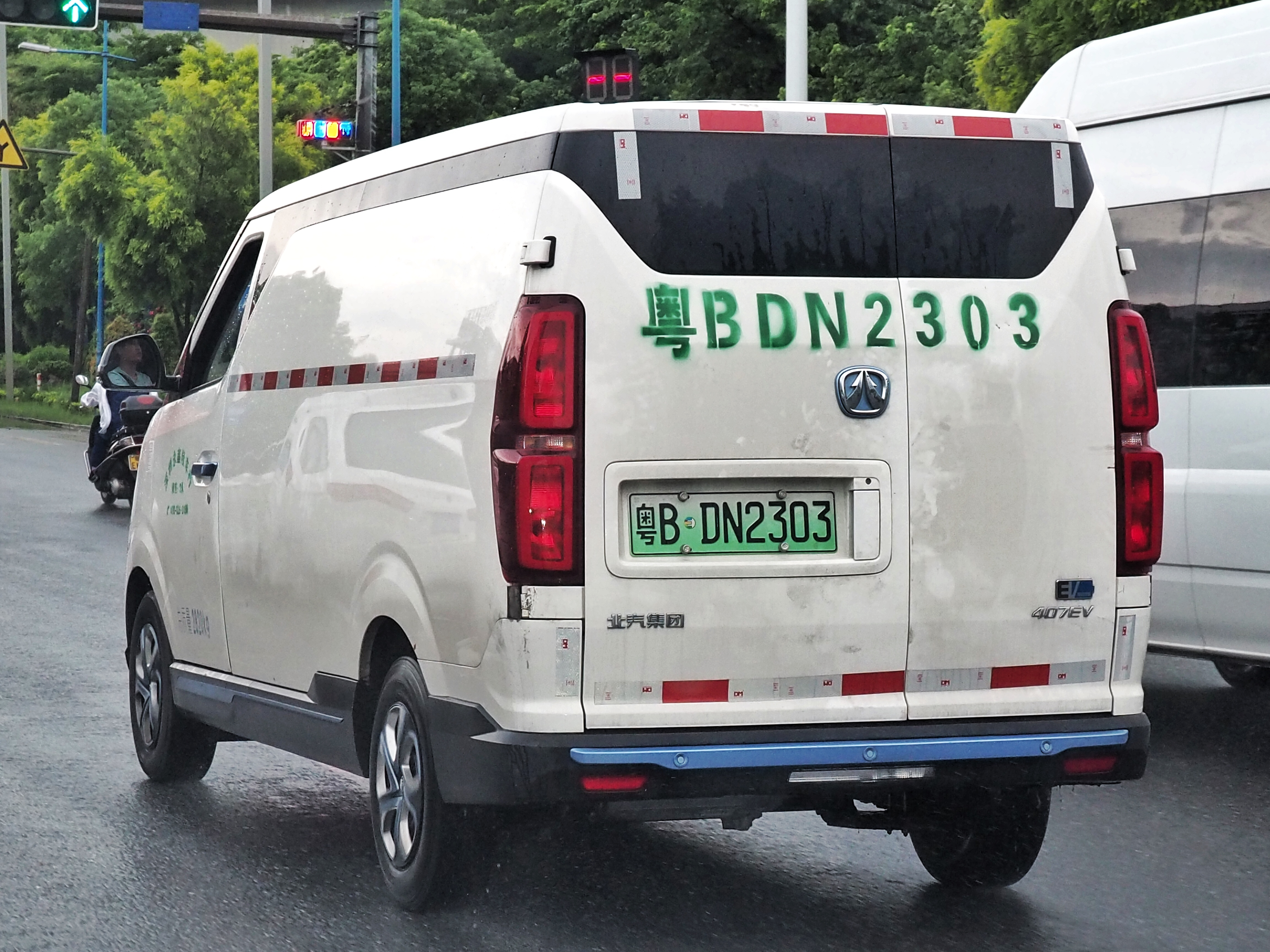
BAIC Weiwang 407 EV rear quarter

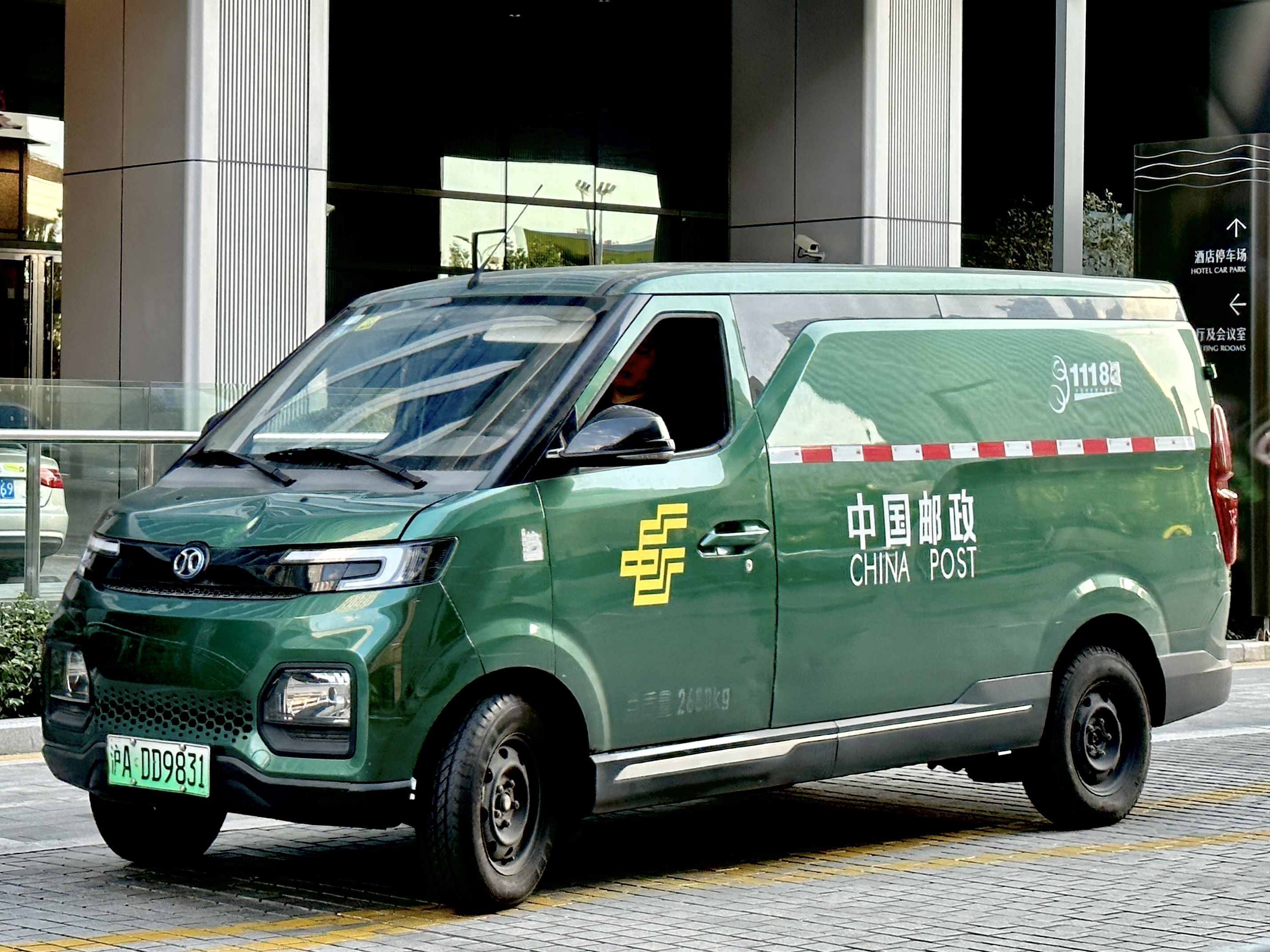
BAIC EV5 serving as postal van in Shanghai

The Weiwang 407 EV pure electric panel van is a battery electric vehicle equipped with a 43.5 kWh battery delivering an NEDC range of 220 km or 138 miles. DC charging is supported and charging up to 80 percent requires 30 minutes.

The 389 kg (858 lbs) battery pack has an energy density of 115.54Wh/kg. The drivetrain of the Weiwang 407 EV consists of two electric motors sitting at the front and rear of the vehicle, the motor in the front produces a maximum power of 62 kW (83 hp), while the motor in the rear is capable of producing 30 kW (40 hp). The maximum power produced by the two motors together allowed by the system is 62 kW (83 hp). The 407 EVs front electric motor generates 220 N⋅m (162 lb⋅ft) torque, with the electric motor in the rear delivering 105 N⋅m (77 lb⋅ft). The maximum system torque produced by the two motors combined is 220 N⋅m (162 lb⋅ft). The maximum speed of the Weiwang 407 EV panel van is 80 km/h (50 mph). The maximum load capacity of the Weiwang 407 EV in volume is 4.5 cubic-meters, and the maximum pay load capacity is 880 kg (1,940 lb), and the maximum operating weight of the 407 EV is 2,410 kg (5,313 lb).

As of 2018, pricing for the Weiwang 407 EV in China starts at 109,800.00 ¥, and 78,900 ¥ after government incentives.
