= Maeving =

British electric motorcycle brand

Maeving is a British electric motorcycle brand. Established in 2021 and based in Coventry, the company produces c. 1,600 motorcycles annually, using majority British-made parts.

As of 2026, the company's range consists of three core models, all featuring wheel hub motors, swappable batteries and retro styling:

- RM1, the inaugural single-seater model
- RM1S, extended range model
- RM2, two-seater model

The bikes are designed to mimic classic styling, with an 'engine block' which actually houses the removable batteries, and 'fuel tank' which is a storage compartment.

Maeving bikes are sold in Germany, France, and the US, in addition to their native UK where they employ the direct-to-consumer business model.
