= Jiangnan Automobile =

Chinese automobile company

Hunan Jiangnan Automobile Manufacturing Co., Ltd.
- Native name: 湖南江南汽车制造有限公司
- Company type: Subsidiary
- Founded: 2001; 25 years ago
- Headquarters: Xiangtan, China
- Parent: Zotye Auto

Hunan Jiangnan Automobile Manufacturing Co., Ltd. (simplified Chinese: 湖南江南汽车制造有限公司; traditional Chinese: 湖南江南汽車製造有限公司; pinyin: Húnán Jiāngnán Qìchē Zhìzào Yǒuxiàn Gōngsī), commonly known as Jiangnan Automobile (simplified Chinese: 江南汽车; traditional Chinese: 江南汽車; pinyin: Jiāngnán Qìchē) is a Chinese automobile manufacturing company established in 2001 and majority owned by Zotye from 2007 onwards, headquartered in Xiangtan. It went bankrupt, entered reorganisation in 2021 and was relaunched in 2022.

== History ==
The company was officially established in 2001 by the Jiangnan Machinery Group, a subsidiary of the state-owned enterprise Norinco. Zotye acquired a stake in Jiangnan Automobile between 2006 and 2007, reorganising it in March 2007. Zotye took a 70% controlling stake while the Jiangnan Machinery Group kept a minority 30%. The aim of the Zotye acquisition was to get various production permits from the government. The company's production, initially focused on assembling Suzuki Alto-based vehicles, was relaunched in April 2007, later also adding Fiat-based models. Jiangnan Automobile assembled mostly Zotye-badged cars such as the Jiangnan TT, the Zotye Z100, the Zotye Z300, the Zotye 5008, the M300, the Zotye Z200HB, the Zotye Yun 100 and others.

In November 2021, the company filed for "bankruptcy and reorganisation" as part of a wider restructuring by parent Zotye in order to try stopping its own bankruptcy and liquidation. It was re-established by the end of that year, after Jiangsu Shenshang, the new owner of Zotye, completed its reorganisation process.

In February 2023, news about an upcoming electric microcar by Jiangnan surfaced called the Jiangnan U2. The Jiangnan U2 vehicle body is heavily based on the Ruixiang HOEN O2 or originally, Qingchengshidai.

According to the Organisation Internationale des Constructeurs d'Automobiles, in 2012 Jiangnan Automobile was ranked as the 40th manufacturer of motor vehicles by number produced, with 117,051.

== Products ==
=== Current Models ===
- Jiangnan U2
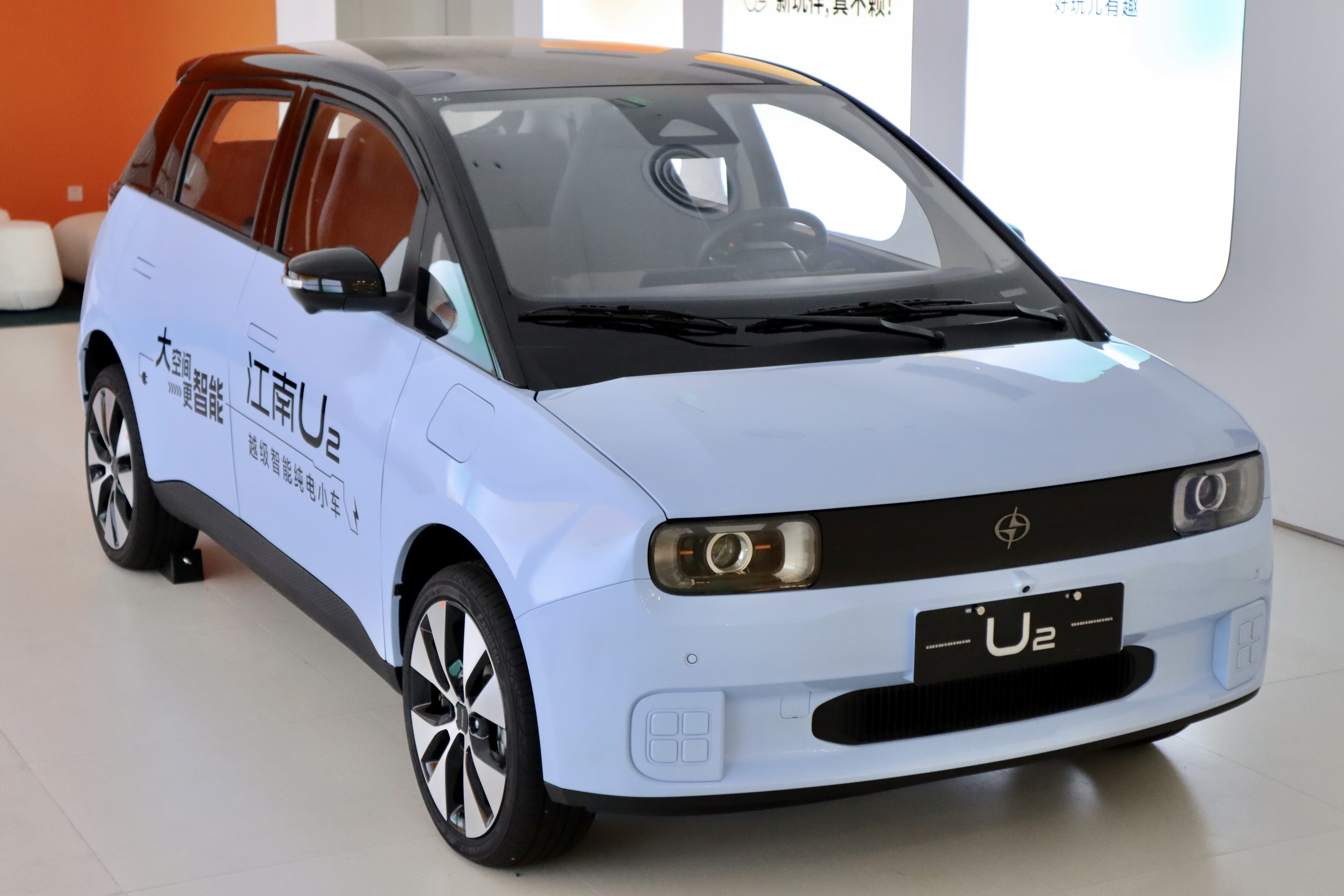
Jiangnan U2

=== Former Models ===
- Jiangnan Alto
- Jiangnan TT
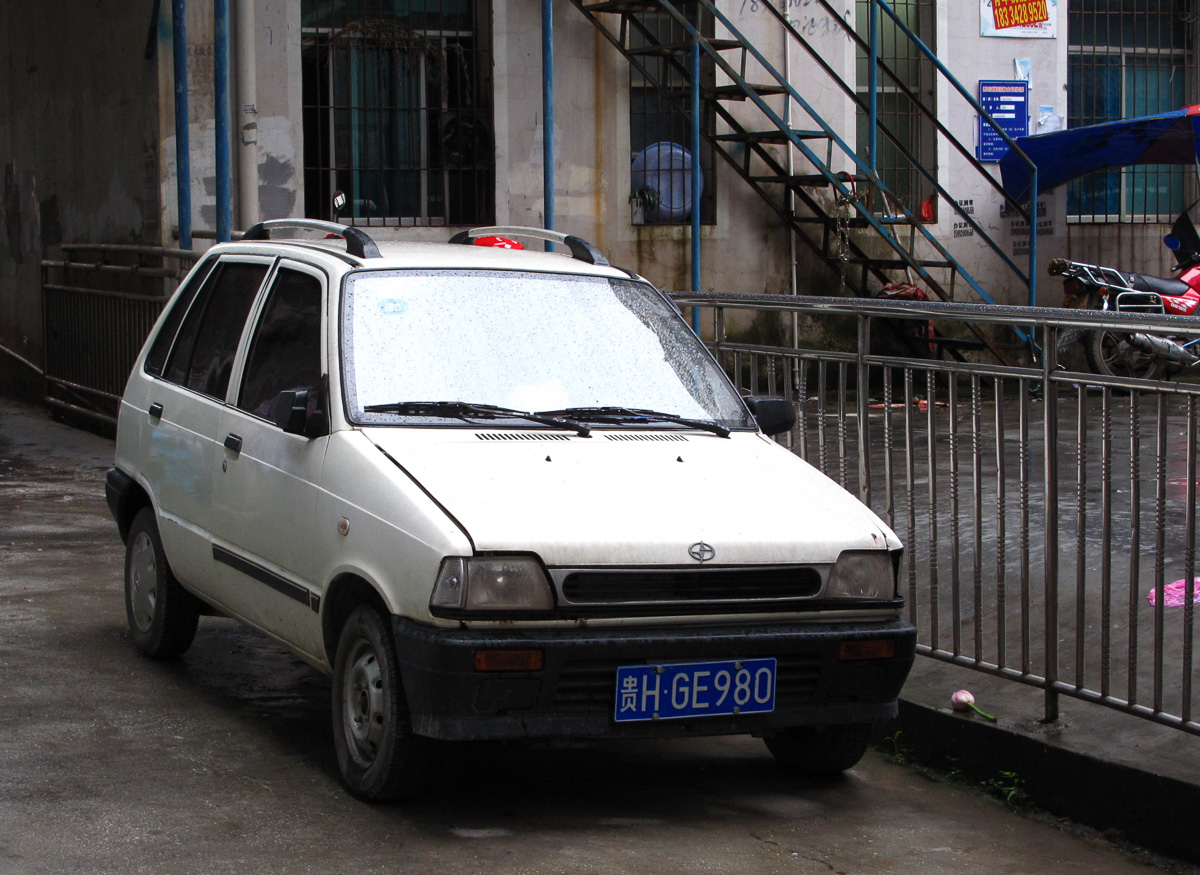
Jiangnan Alto

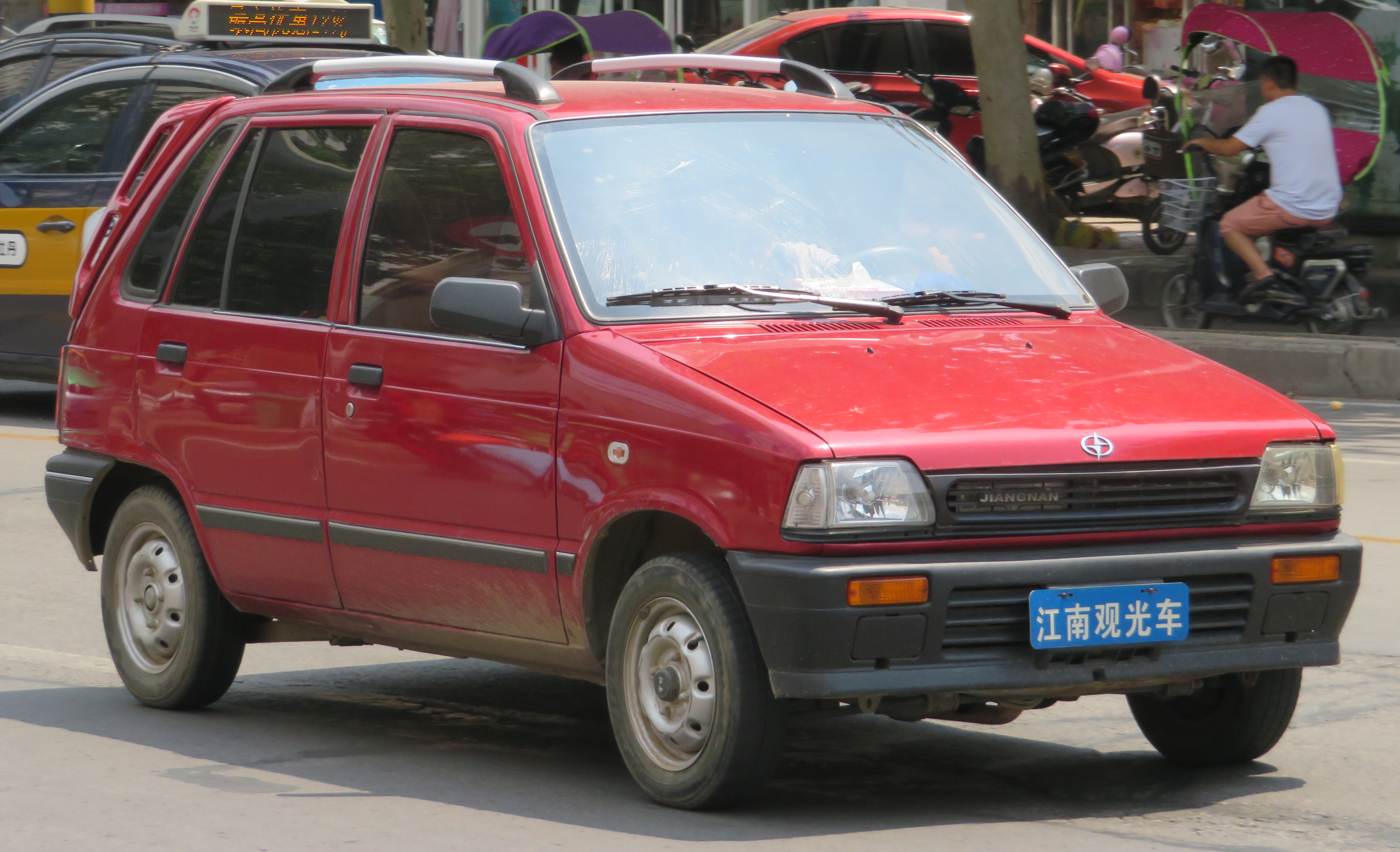
Jiangnan TT
