= Zotye Z700 =

Chinese sedan

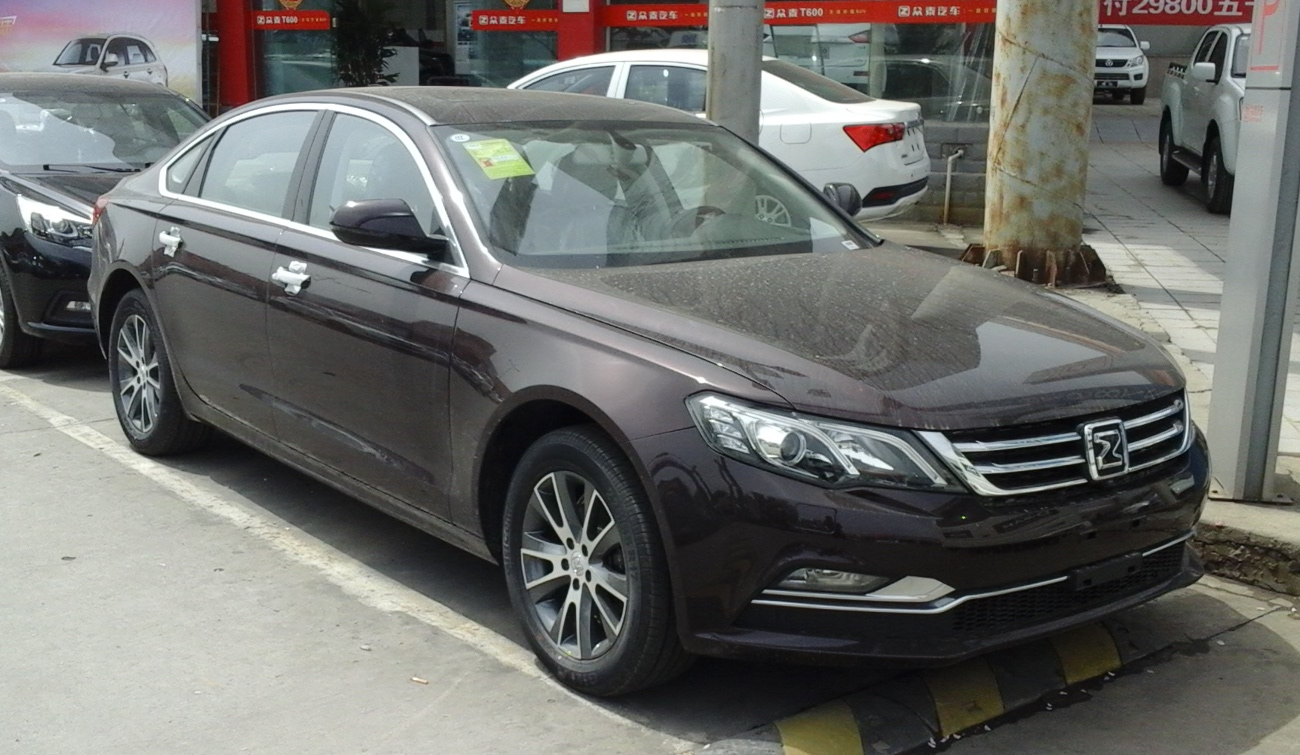
- Zotye Z700

Overview
- Manufacturer: Zotye Auto
- Also called: Zotye Z700H
- Production: 2015–2021

Body and chassis
- Body style: 4-door sedan
- Layout: Front-engine, front-wheel-drive

Powertrain
- Engine: 1.8 L turbo I4
- Transmission: 5-speed manual 6-speed DCT

Dimensions
- Wheelbase: 2,970 mm (116.9 in)
- Length: 5,020 mm (197.6 in)
- Width: 1,877 mm (73.9 in)
- Height: 1,469 mm (57.8 in)

The Zotye Z700 is a mid-size sedan produced by Chinese auto maker Zotye Auto. It is considered the brand's flagship sedan.

== Overview ==
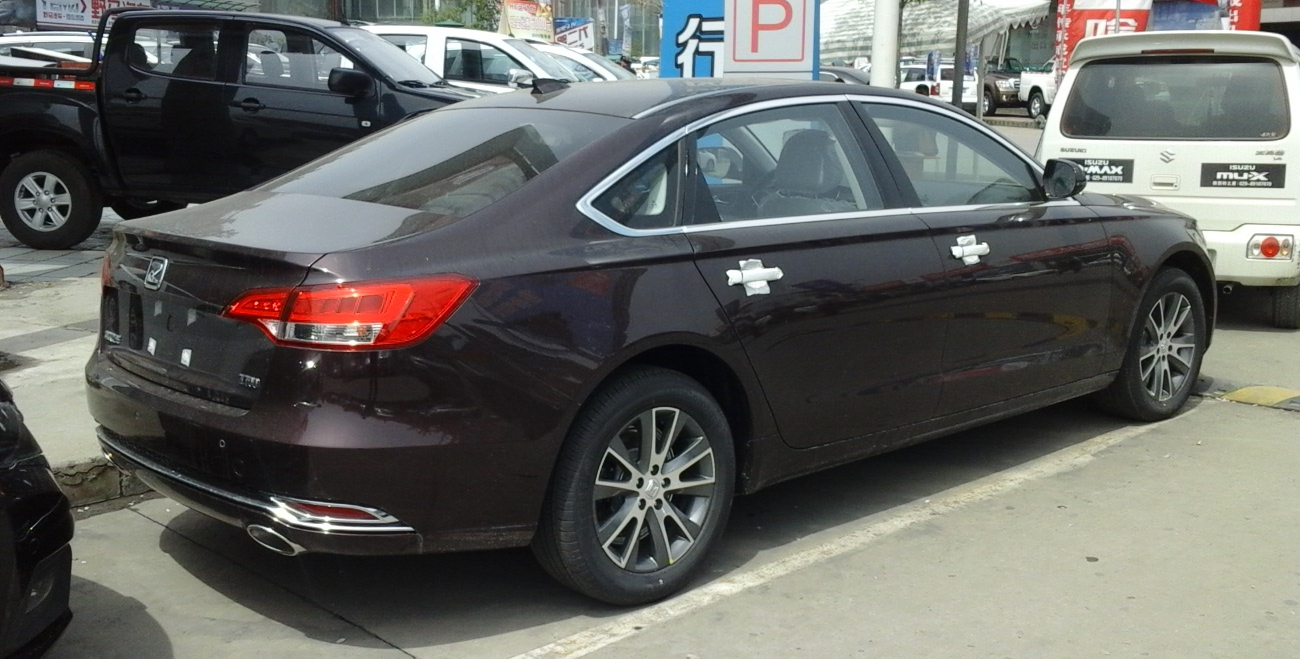
Zotye Z700 rear

The Zotye Z700 debuted at the 2015 Shanghai Auto Show and was positioned above the Zotye Z500 mid-size sedan. During the development phase of the Zotye Z700, the full-size sedan was actually called the Zotye Z600.

Power comes from a 1.8L turbo through a 5-speed manual or 6-speed DCT powering the front wheels. The Zotye Z700 is available to the Chinese market in 2015 with prices ranging from 105,800 yuan to 165,800 yuan.

=== Design ===
The vehicle has most of its design based on the Audi A6.

== Zotye Z700H ==
The Zotye Z700H is the 2018 facelift version of the Zotye Z700 sedan featuring subtle interior and exterior styling details update.

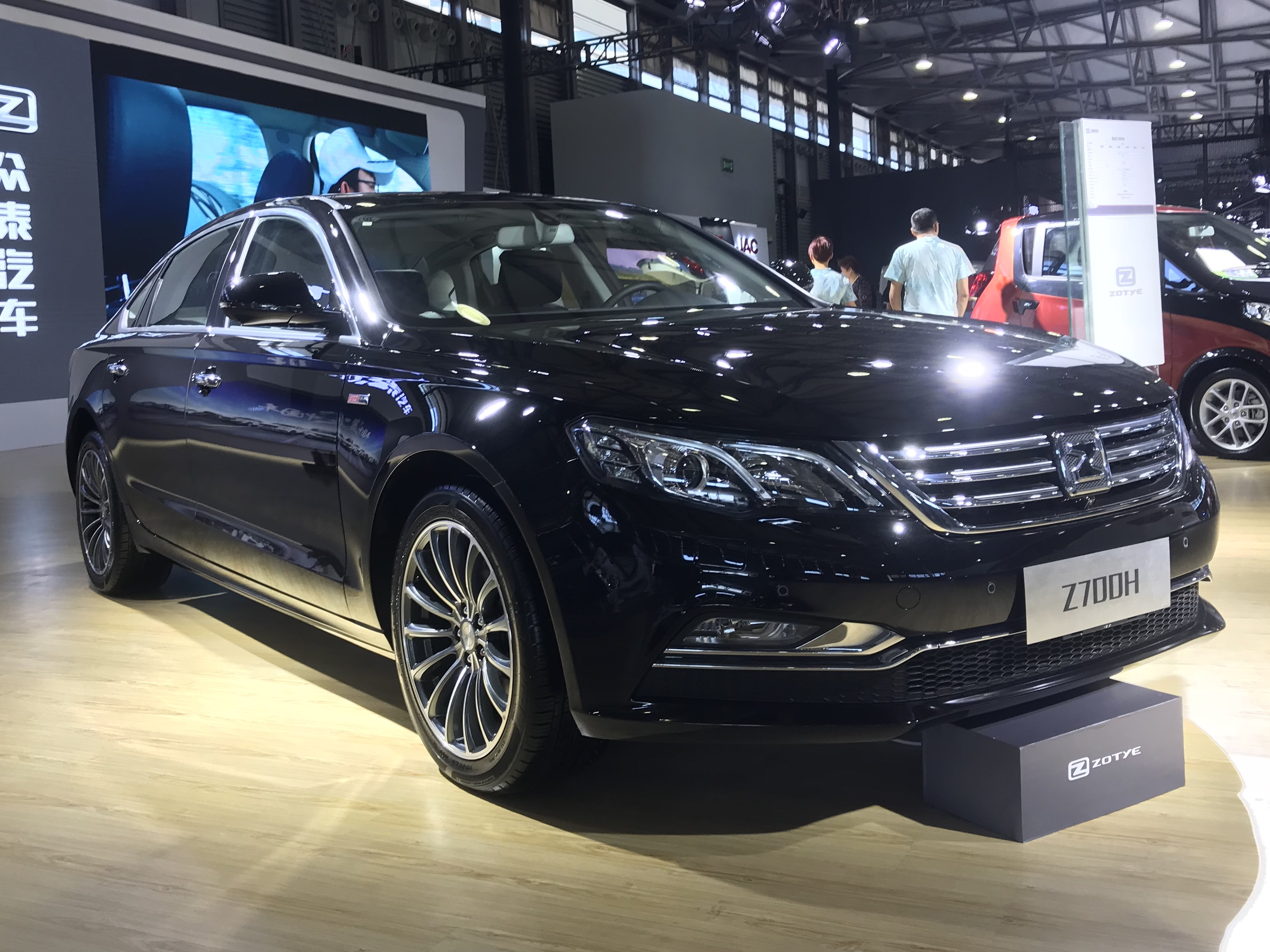
Zotye Z700H front

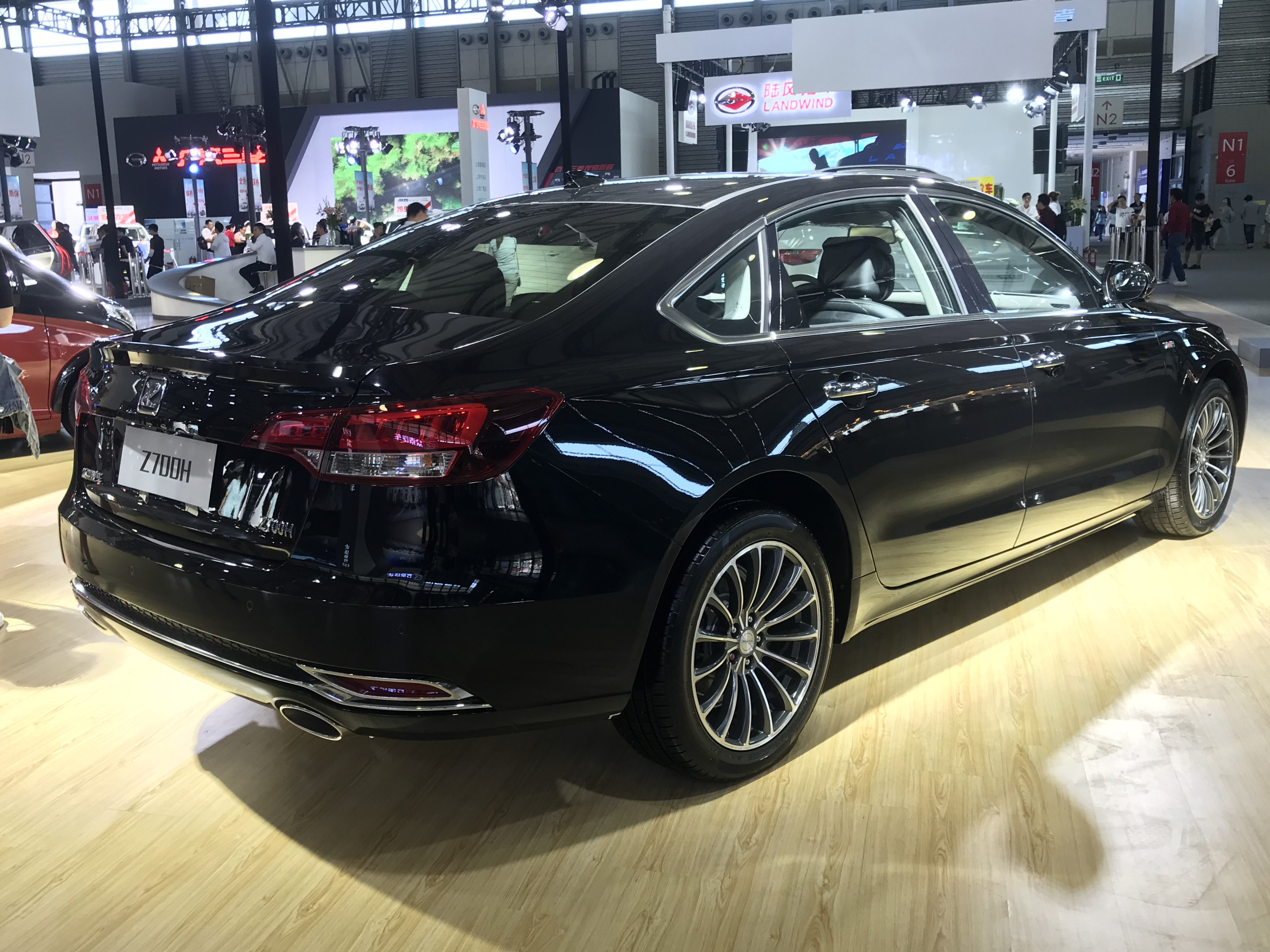
Zotye Z700H rear
