= Zotye Z500 =

Chinese sedan

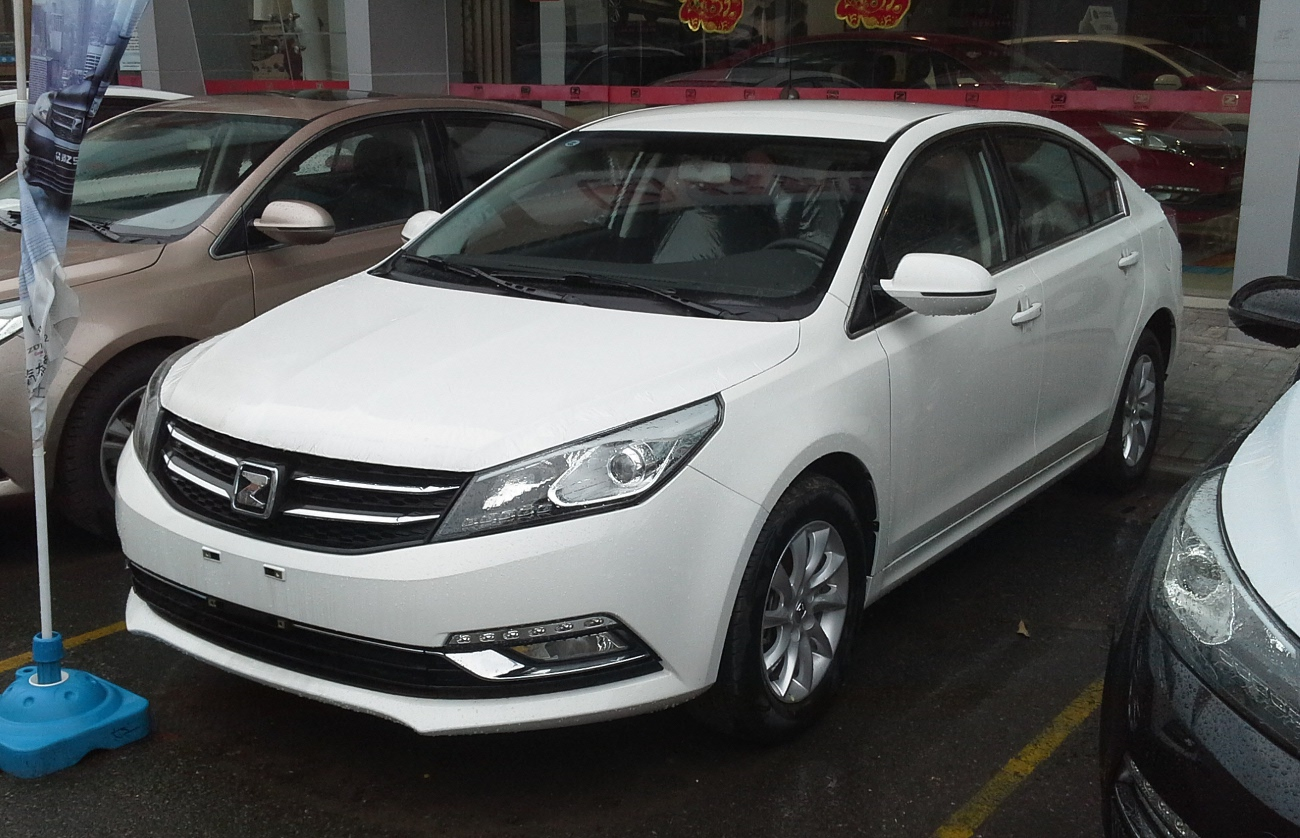
- Zotye Z500

Overview
- Manufacturer: Zotye Auto
- Also called: Zotye Z560
- Production: 2014–2021

Body and chassis
- Body style: 4-door sedan
- Layout: Front-engine, front-wheel-drive

Powertrain
- Engine: 1.5 L turbo I4
- Transmission: 5-speed automatic CVT

Dimensions
- Wheelbase: 2,750 mm (108.3 in)
- Length: 4,750 mm (187.0 in)
- Width: 1,810 mm (71.3 in)
- Height: 1,490 mm (58.7 in)

The Zotye Z500 or Zotye Z560 was a compact sedan produced by Chinese auto maker Zotye Auto.

== Overview ==
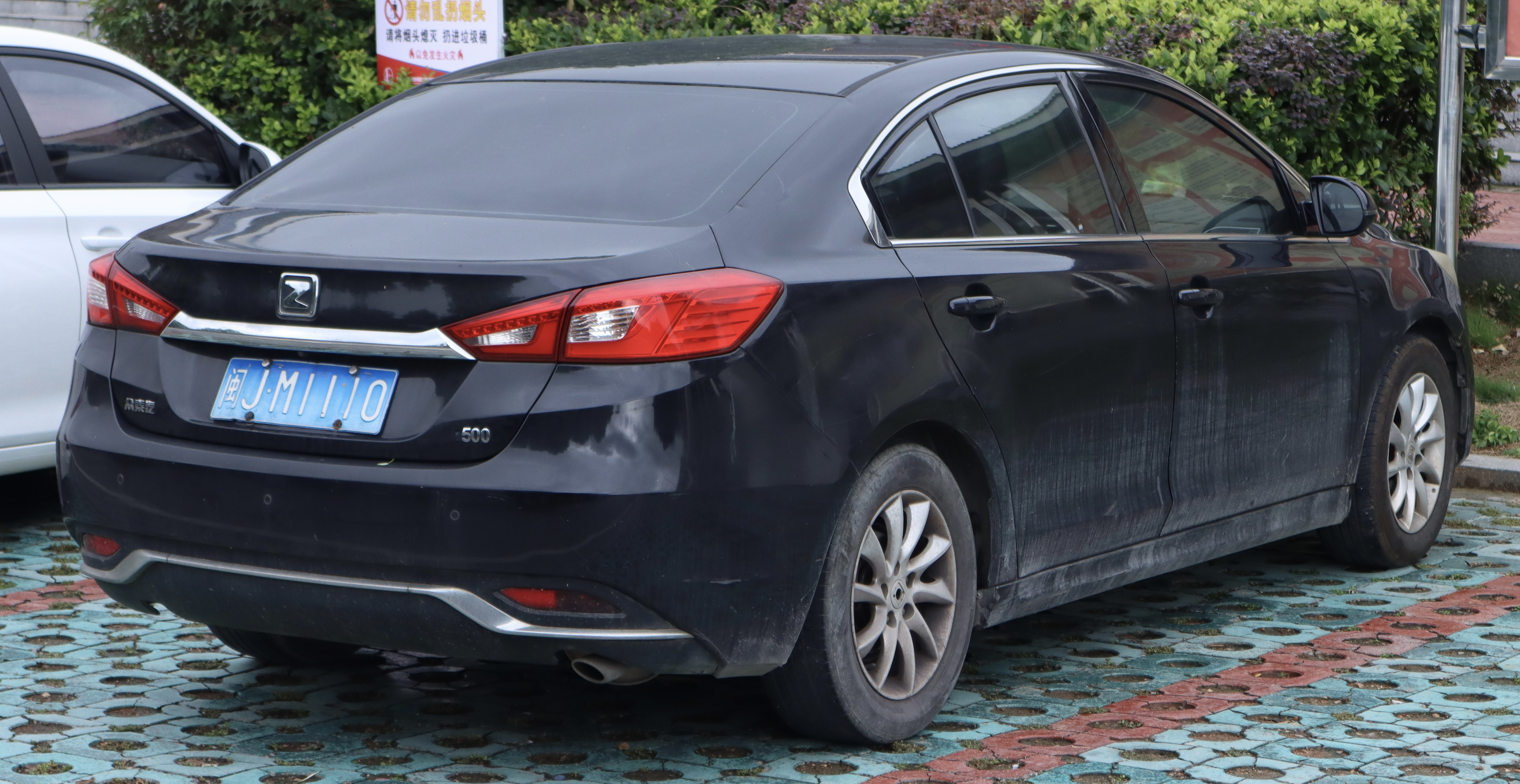
Zotye Z500 rear

The Zotye Z500 debuted at the 2014 Beijing Auto Show and was positioned above the Zotye Z300 compact sedan. Power comes from a Mitsubishi-sourced 1.5L putting out 120 hp and 143 nm of torque through a 5-speed manual or 5-speed automatic powering the front wheels. The Zotye Z500 is available to the Chinese market in November 2014 with prices ranging from 75,800 yuan to 140,800 yuan. A facelift was conducted shortly after with a name change to Zotye 560.

== Zotye Z500 EV ==
The Zotye Z500 EV is the electric version of the Zotye Z500 sedan, and was sold alongside the Zotye Z560 sedan at the same time with prices ranging from 199,900 to 229,800 yuan. There are three different ranges of models including options from 200, 250, and 330 kilometers of maximum range trim. The electric motors produces 72 to 95kW and 200 to 260 Nm of torque.
