= Zotye Z100 =

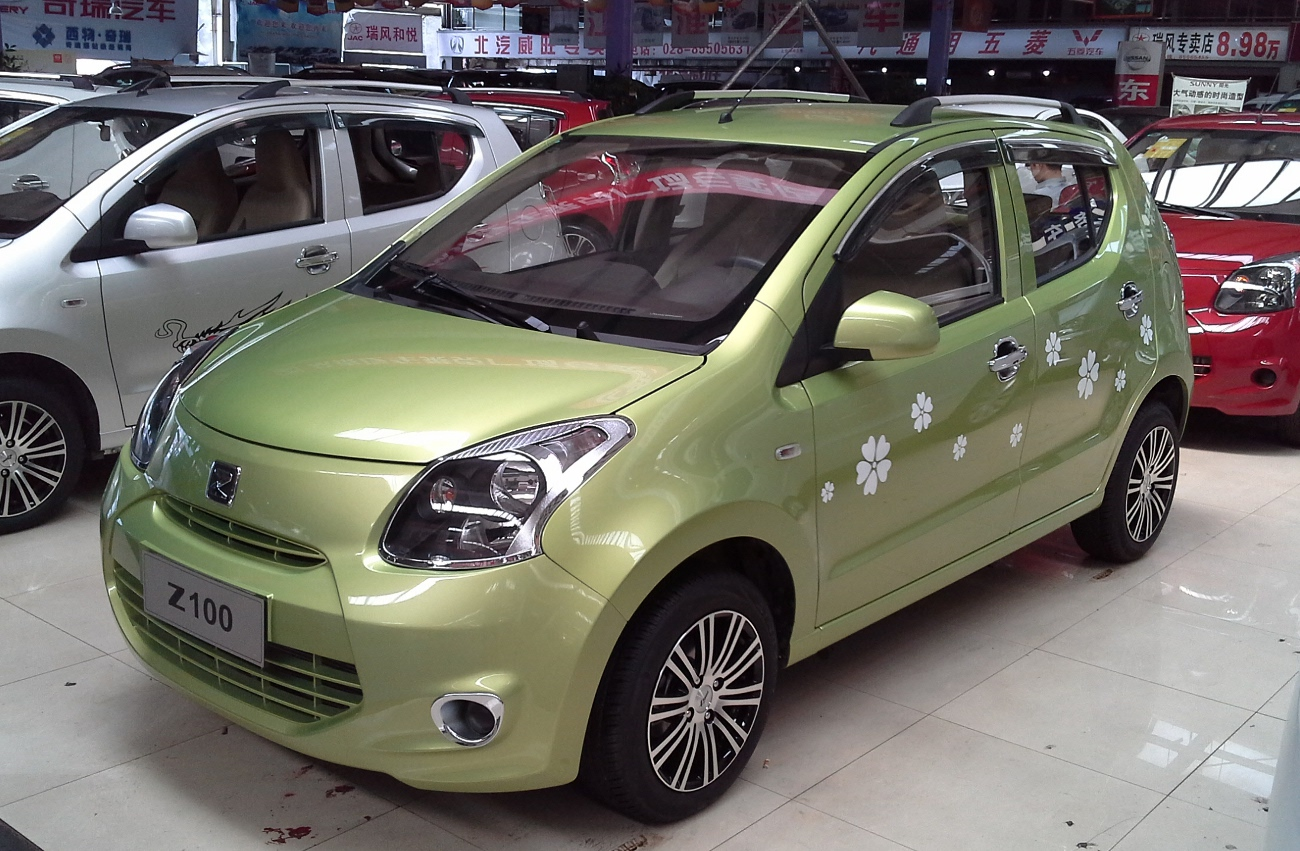
- Zotye Z100

Overview
- Also called: Zotye Cloud 100Plus; Zotye Cloud 100S
- Production: 2013–2017; 2017–2019 (Zotye Cloud 100)
- Assembly: China: Xiangtan (Jiangnan Automobile) Sri Lanka : United Motors

Body and chassis
- Class: City car (A)
- Body style: 5-door hatchback
- Layout: Front-engine, front-wheel-drive

Powertrain
- Engine: 1.0 L TNN3G10K I3
- Transmission: 5-speed manual 4-speed automatic

Dimensions
- Wheelbase: 2,360 mm (92.9 in)
- Length: 3,627 mm (142.8 in)
- Width: 1,620 mm (63.8 in)
- Height: 1,476 mm (58.1 in)

Chronology
- Predecessor: Jiangnan TT

The Zotye Z100 is a City car hatchback produced by Zotye Auto. The model is available as a gasoline powered vehicle and as an electric vehicle. The Z100 was discontinued in 2017, while the electric version was relaunched in 2017 as the Zotye Cloud 100.

== Overview ==
Originally launched as the new Jiangnan TT in prototype form, the production version was renamed to Zotye Z100 to fit into the refreshed Zotye product line.

The Zotye Z100 debuted during the 2012 Shanghai Auto Show, and was launched in the Chinese market since September 2013, replacing the Jiangnan TT, which was based on the Suzuki Alto CA71 sold from 1988 to 2013 in China.

=== Powertrain ===
The only engine choice for the Z100 is a 1.0-litre 3-cylinder engine with 56 hp (42 kW; 57 PS) known as the TNN3G10K. Gearbox options are a 5-speed manual transmission or a 4-speed automatic transmission.

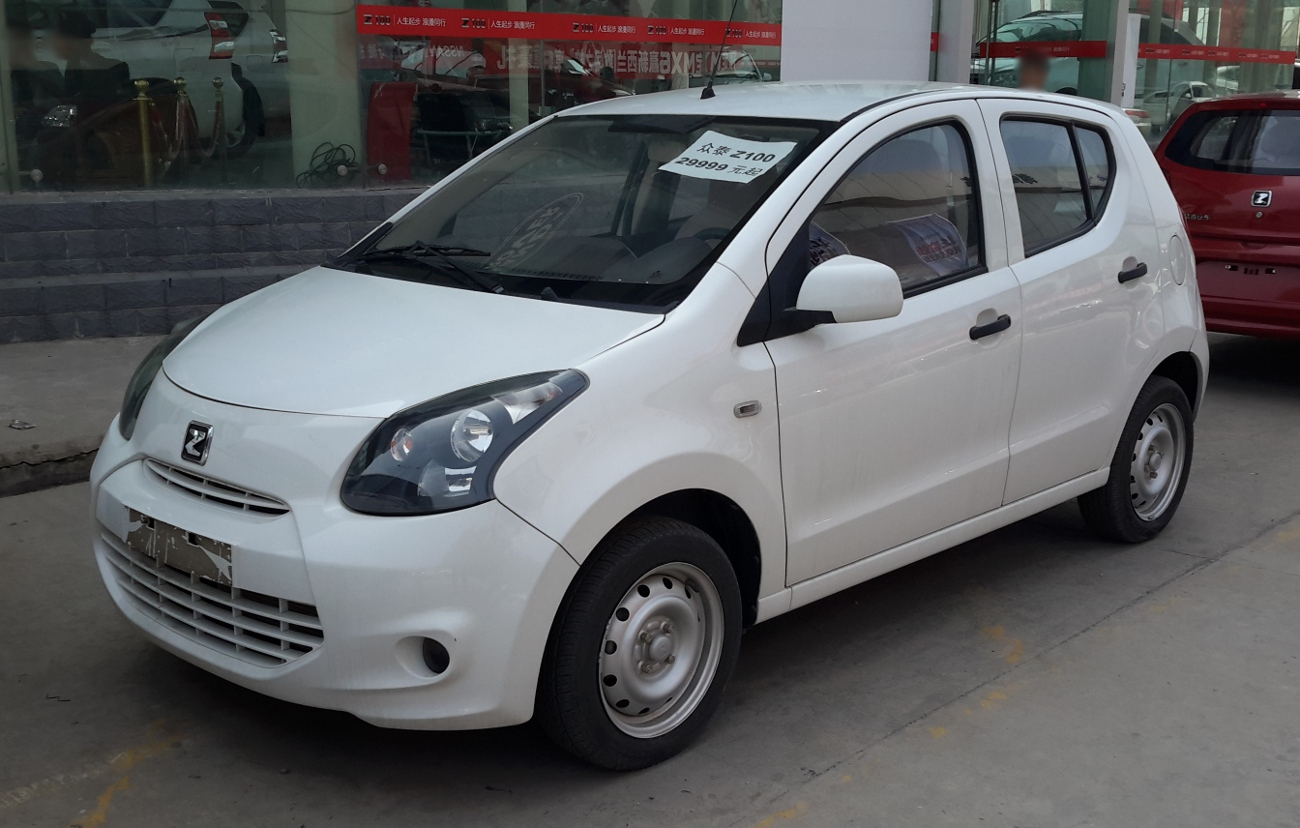
Zotye Z100
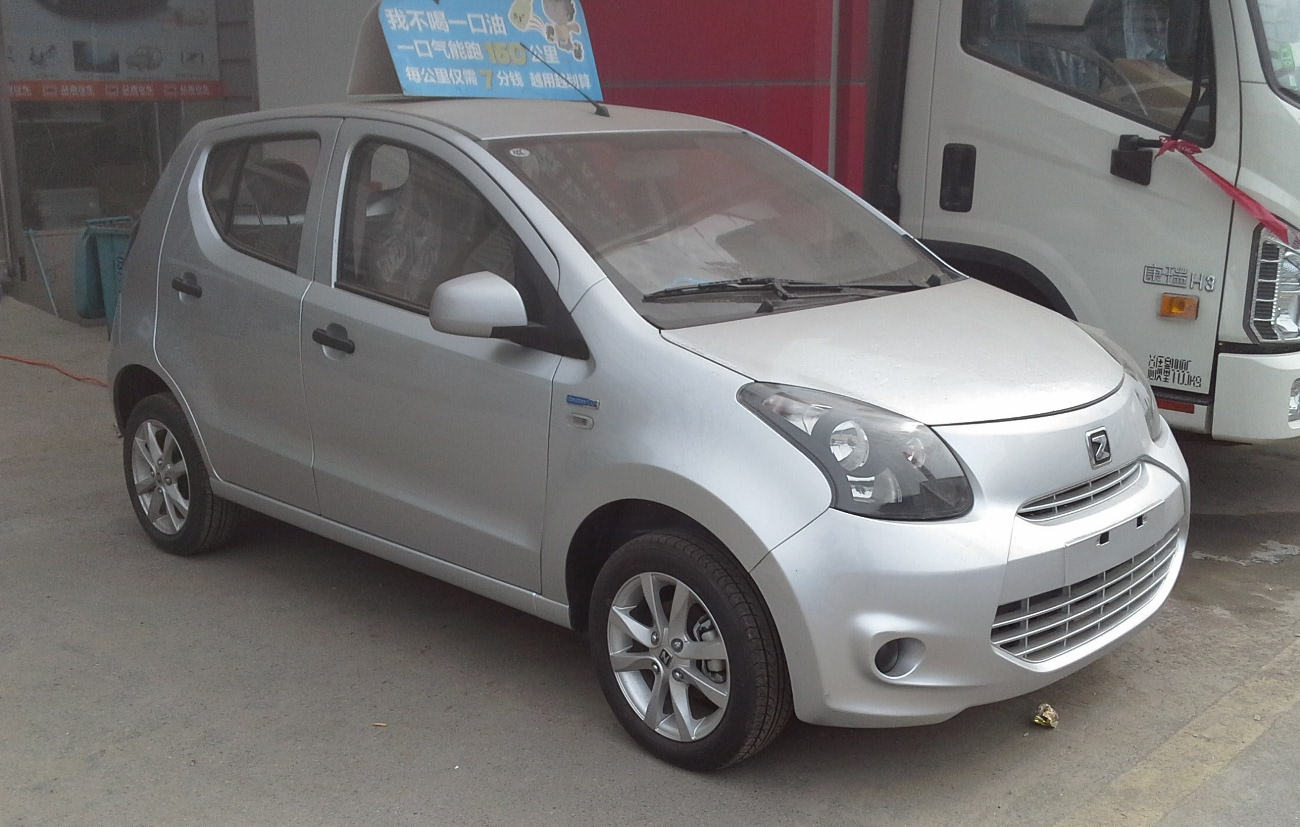
Zotye Z100 EV

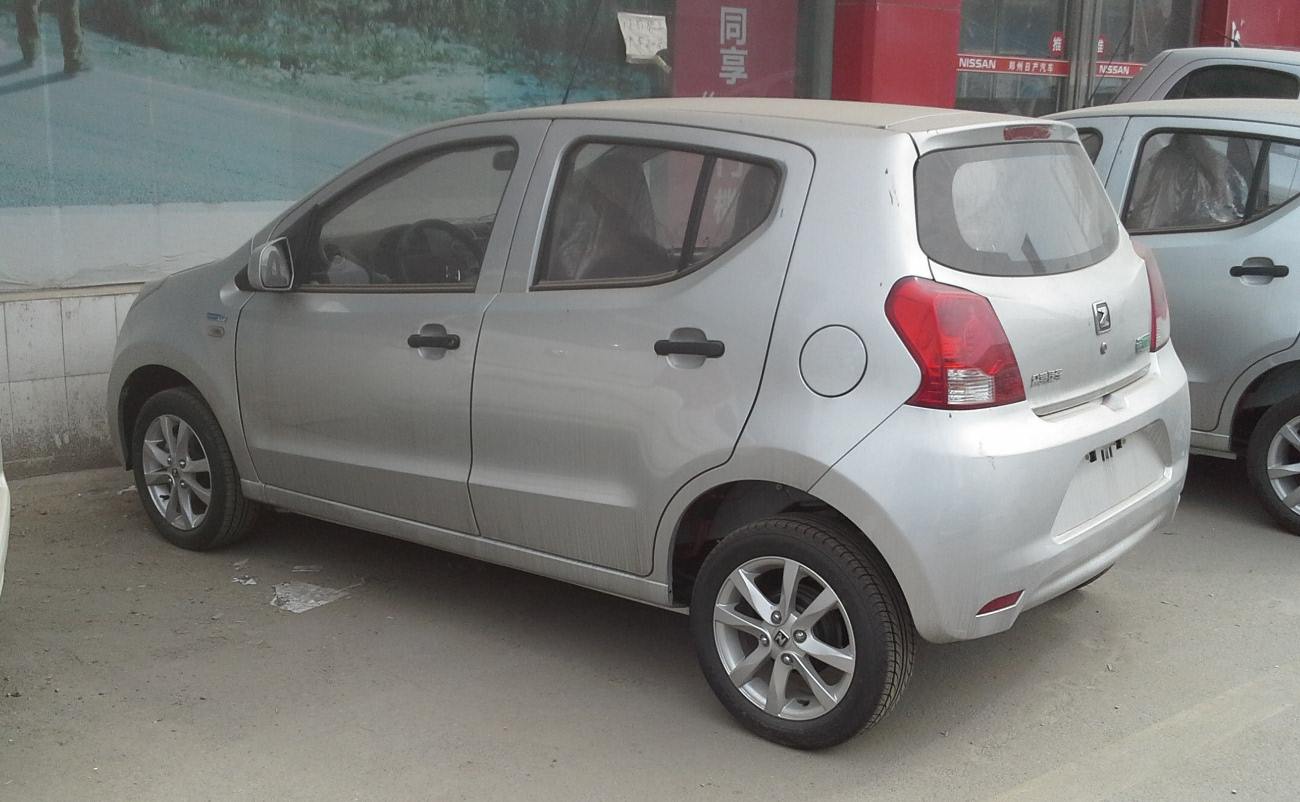
Rear view

== Zotye Cloud 100 ==
The Zotye Cloud 100 is the successor of the Zotye Z100 EV and was first introduced in 2017, with updated versions launched in 2018. The company started taking orders for the car in January 2015. The original version had 5 doors, 5 seats, front-wheel drive, and a 22 kWh battery that gives 125-mile (201 km) range, 64 mph (103 km/h) top speed, and 36 horsepower (27 kW; 36 PS).

The 2018 model year is offered in two additional versions, mainly changing the comfort trim models: short range and long range. The short range model had a 194-mile (312 km) range and 60 horsepower (45 kW; 61 PS), while the long range produces the same power, but with a more premium cabin. Both versions take 8 hours to charge, have dimensions of 3627 mm/1620 mm/1476 mm, a wheelbase of 2360 mm, kerb weight of 1,040 kg (2,290 lb), and a cost of ¥72,800 in China.

From 2019 to present, sales have dropped in China, and in efforts to reboot sales, the Cloud 100 was exported to Pakistan in 2021. Its main competitor there is the MG ZS. It is also planned to be brought to Russia.

The Zotye Z100 was discontinued after a short run, but the electric versions including the Zotye Cloud 100Plus and Zotye Cloud 100S continued to be sold.

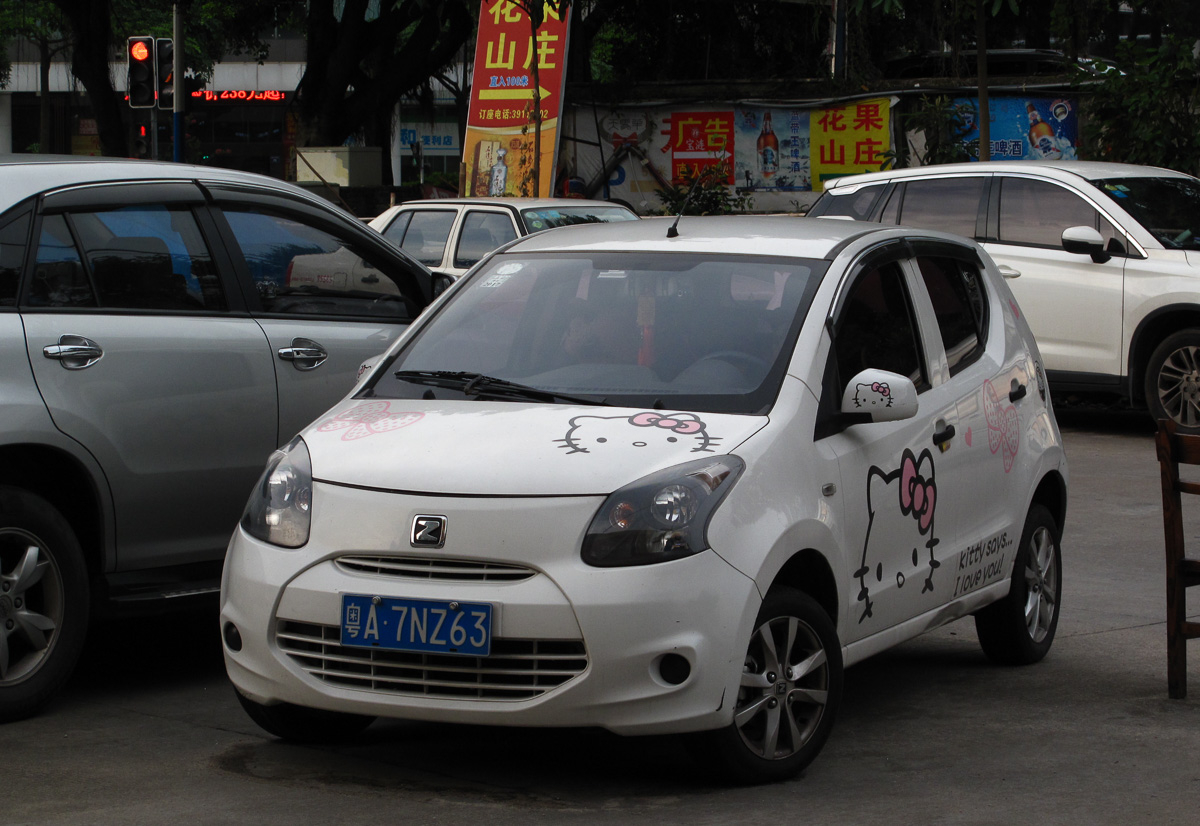
Zotye Cloud 100 EV

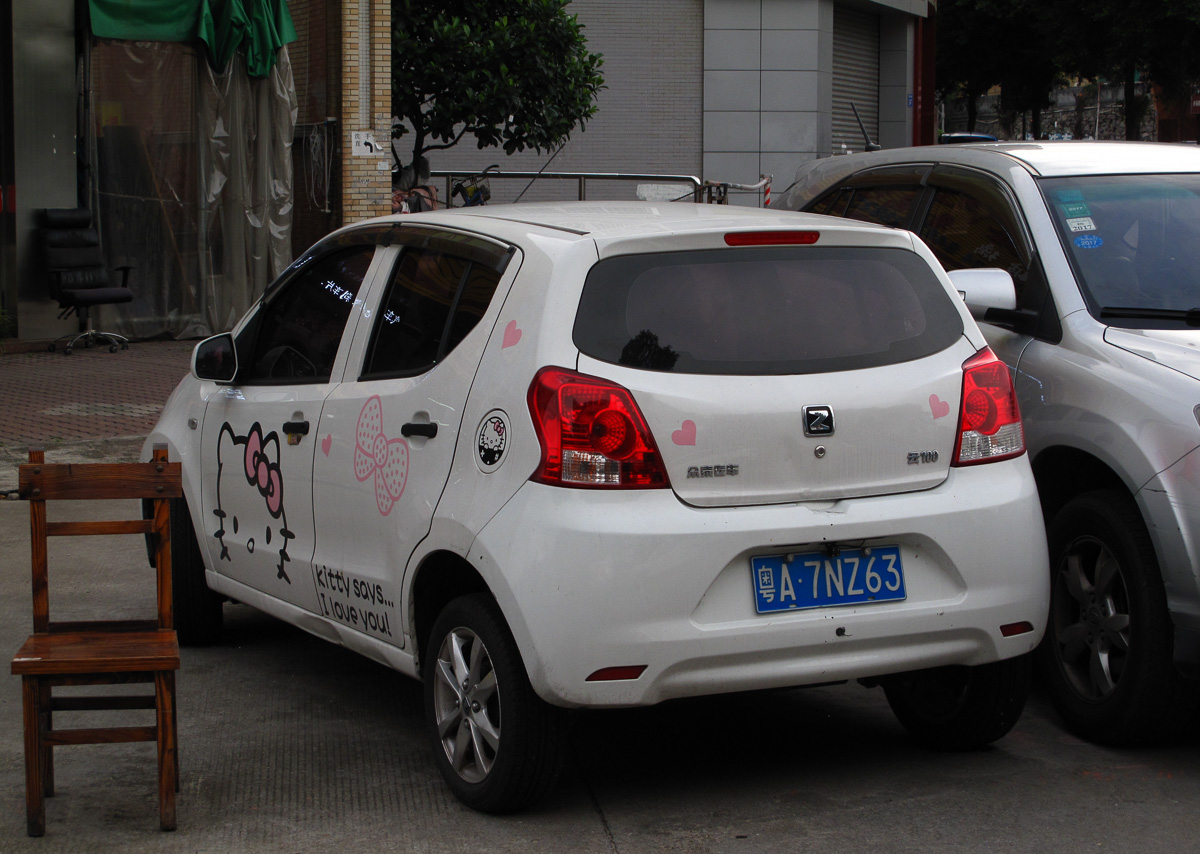
Rear view

== Zotye Cloud 100 Plus (2017-2018) ==
The Zotye Cloud 100 Plus EV was launched on the 10th of October, 2017. The front and rear end was completely restyled compared to the original Cloud EV. The power of the Zotye Cloud 100 Plus EV comes from a 37hp（27kW） electric motor producing 140N·m of torque. Dimensions are 3627/1620/1476mm and the wheelbase remains to be 2360mm. The model was sold through 2017 to 2018, while MIIT released photos published in September 2018 only shows an update for the Zotye Cloud 100.

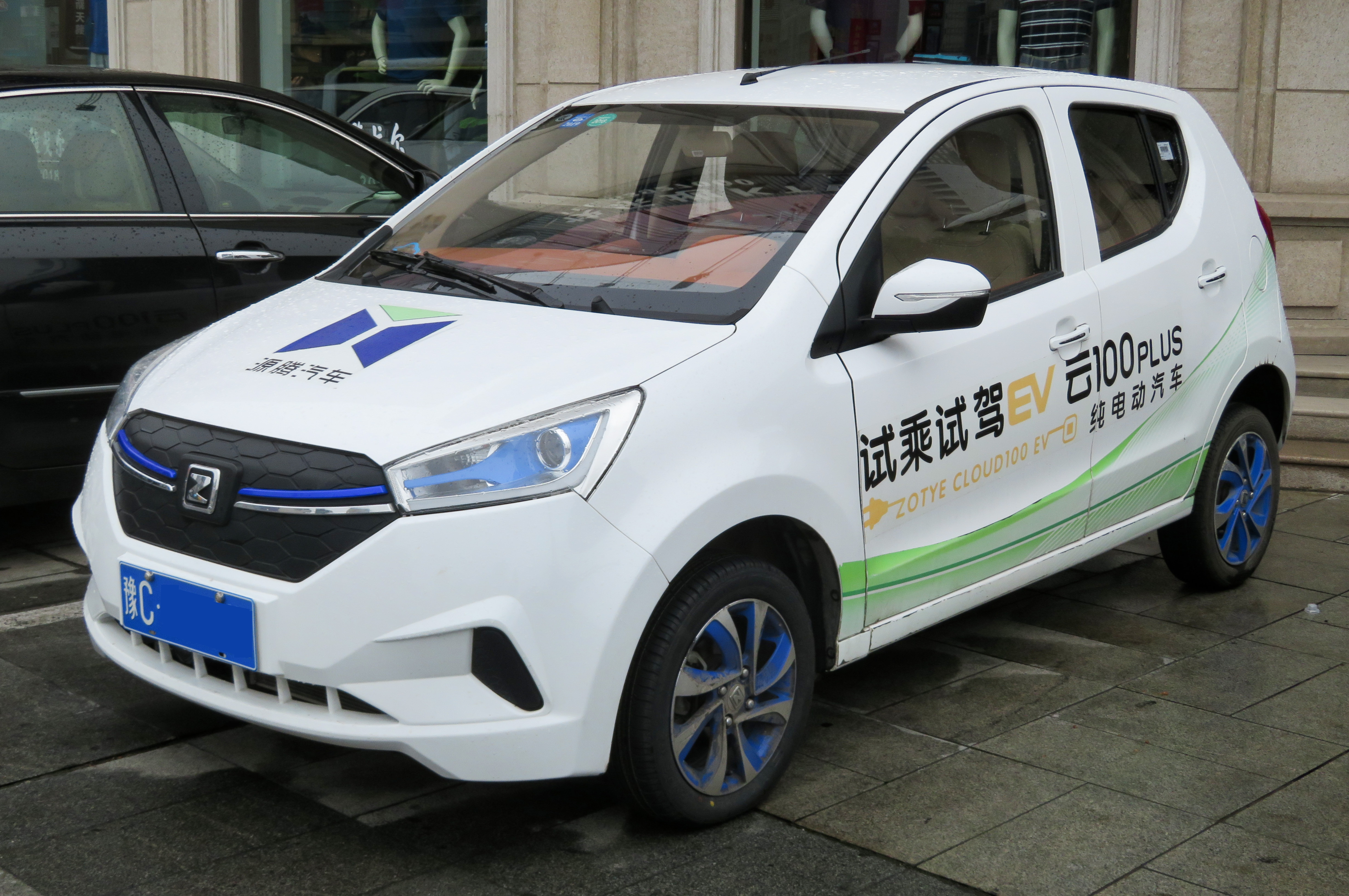
Zotye Cloud 100 Plus EV (facelift model)

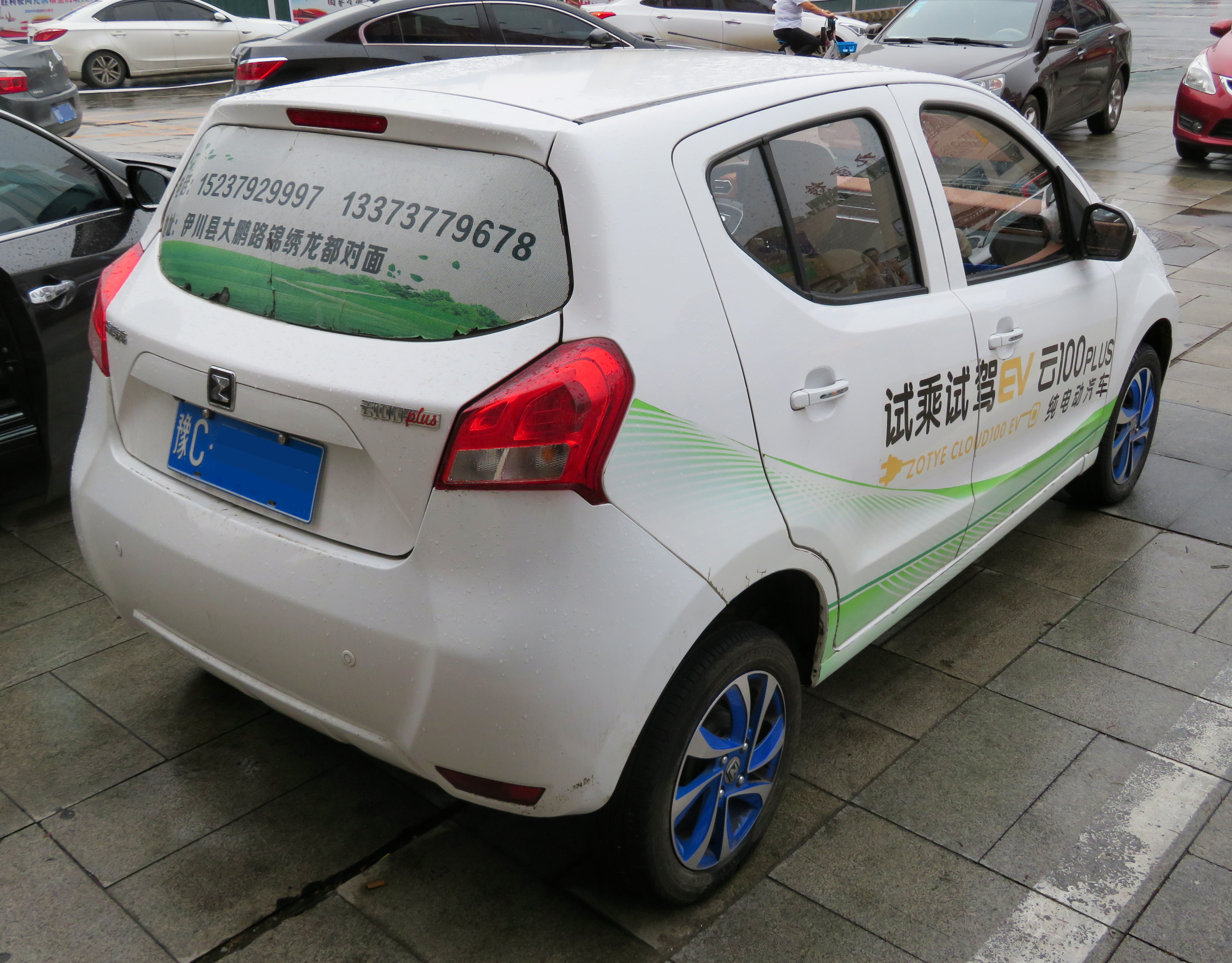
Cloud 100 Plus EV rear

== Design controversies ==
Despite the styling of the Zotye Z100 being very similar to the Suzuki Alto, and the predecessor, Jiangnan TT being a licensed rebadge version of the Suzuki Alto, the Zotye Z100 has nothing to do with Suzuki, but rather a car with styling heavily inspired by the Suzuki Alto.

== Sales ==
Year	China
2015	15,467
2016	16,241
2017	1,045
2018	610
2019	107
