= Ruixiang Hoen O2 =

Battery electric city car

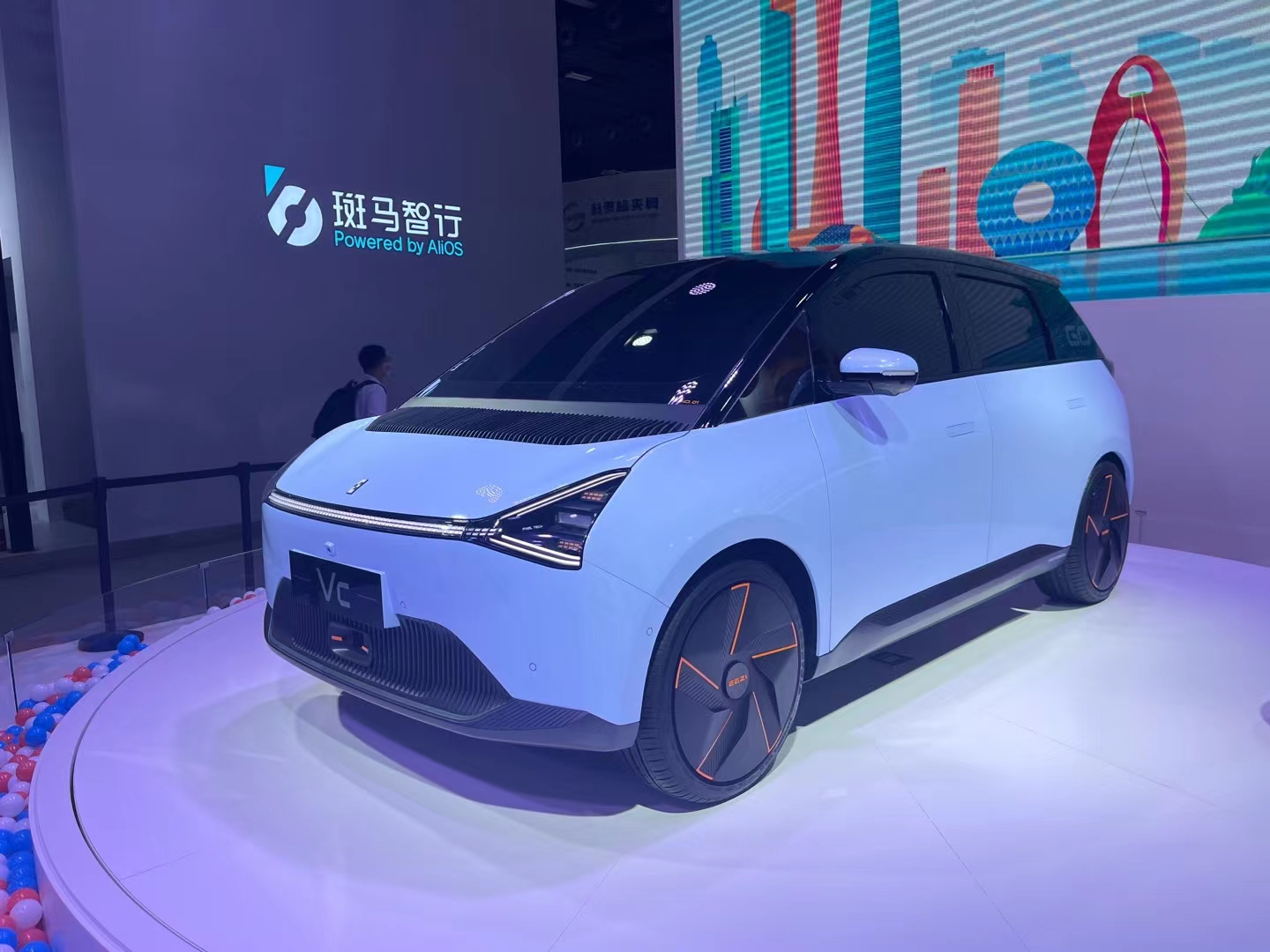

Overview
- Manufacturer: BAIC Ruixiang
- Also called: Qingcheng Shidai VC; Jiangnan U2; Zotye Wink Y01
- Production: 2023–present
- Assembly: China

Body and chassis
- Class: City car (A)
- Body style: 5-door hatchback
- Layout: Front-engine, front-wheel-drive
- Platform: EEZI STEP 1.0

Powertrain
- Electric motor: 75 hp (76 PS; 56 kW); 109 hp (111 PS; 81 kW)
- Transmission: Single-speed automatic (EV)
- Battery: LFP
- Range: 305 or 406 km (190 or 252 mi)

Dimensions
- Wheelbase: 2,520 mm (99.2 in)
- Length: 3,806 mm (149.8 in); 3,912 mm (154.0 in) (Zotye Wink Y01)
- Width: 1,740 mm (68.5 in); 1,745 mm (68.7 in) (Zotye Wink Y01)
- Height: 1,550 mm (61.0 in); 1,545 mm (60.8 in) (Zotye Wink Y01)

The Ruixiang Hoen O2 is a battery electric city car produced by the Chinese manufacturer BAIC Ruixiang.

== Overview ==
The Hoen O2 was originally due to be released as the Qingcheng Shidai VC by Qingcheng Shidai (Shenzhen) Technology Co., Ltd. It was first unveiled during the 2021 Guangzhou Auto Show under the brand Qingcheng Shidai (轻橙时代) with a platform called EEZI STEP 1.0 developed by Qingcheng Shidai and planned to outsource hardware manufacturing from BAIC Ruixiang.

As of December 2022, patent images from BAIC Ruixiang shows a city car called Hoen O2 is in the progress of mass production which is the production version of the original Qingcheng Shidai VC.

According to Qingcheng Shidai, the original Qingcheng Shidai VC could obtain 200 km of range within 8 minutes charging time.

== Jiangnan U2 ==
In February 2023, news about an electric microcar by Jiangnan Automobile surfaced called the Jiangnan U2. The Jiangnan U2 vehicle body is heavily based on the Ruixiang Hoen O2, while the front and rear end designs are restyled to be produced at a lower cost.

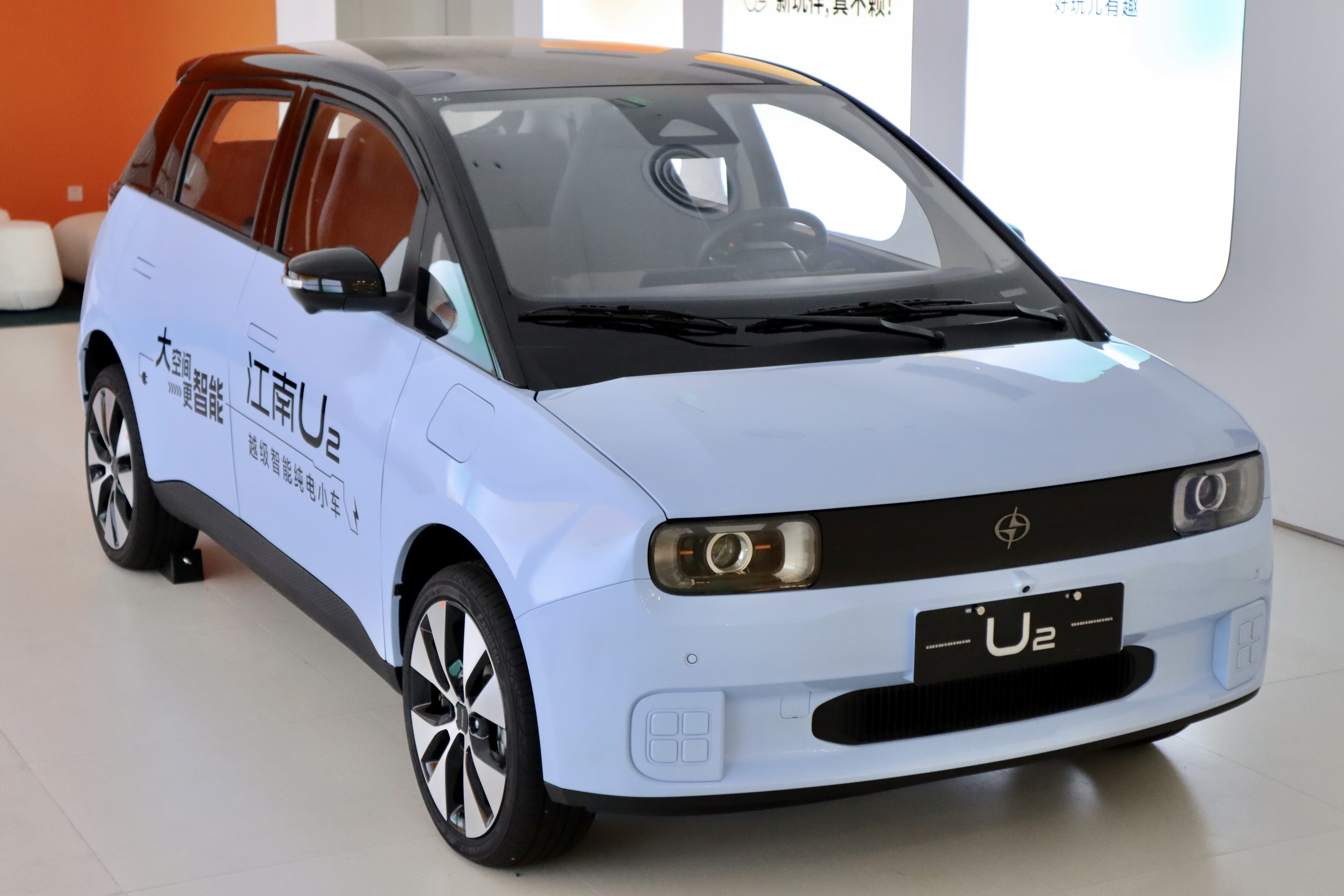
Jiangnan U2

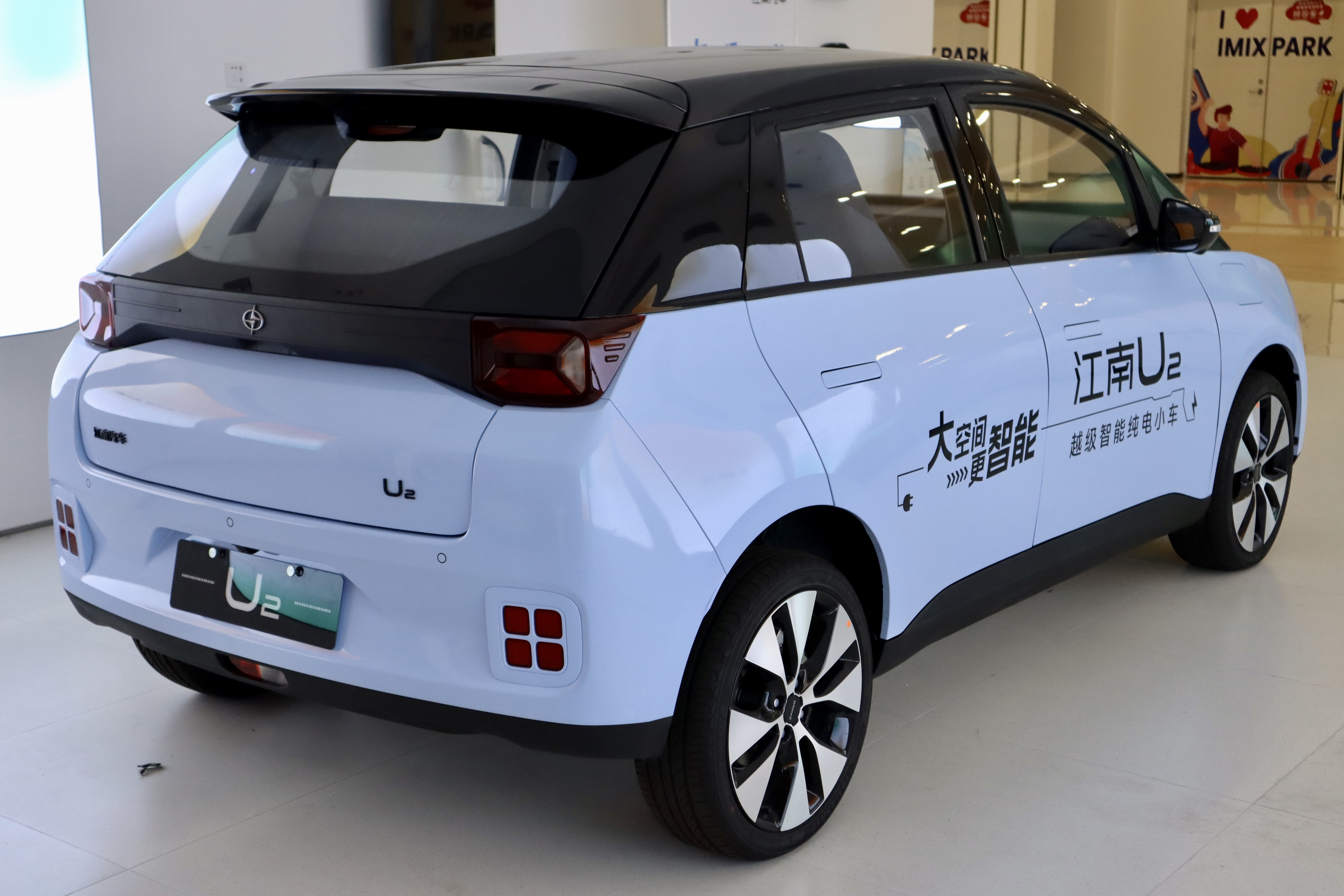
Rear view

== Zotye Wink Y01 ==
On September 9th 2026, The Zotye Auto announced the Wink Y01 international version, being based on the previous Jiangnan U2 from Jiangnan Automobile, a company owned by Zotye, the design of the V01 is near identical to the Qingcheng Shidai VC or Ruixiang Hoen O2 that was the base of the U2, and is targeted towards international markets instead of the Chinese domestic market. According to Zotye, the Y01 is built on the S Pure Electric Small vehicle platform. At the time of the announcement, the Wink Y01 is in pre-production phase with several prototypes rolling off the assembly line.
