= Zotye Z300 =

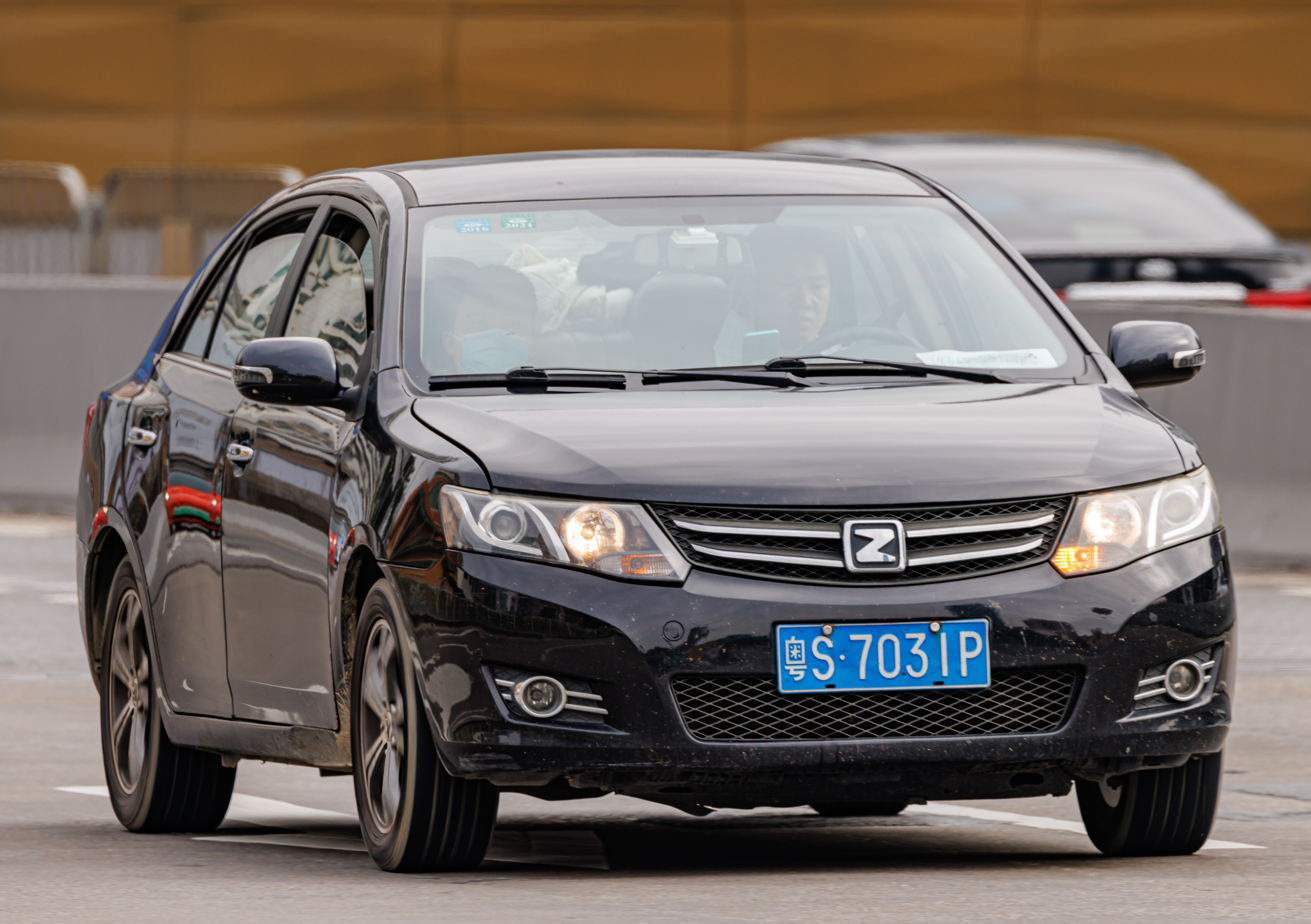
- Zotye Z300

Overview
- Manufacturer: Zotye Auto
- Also called: Zotye Z360; SAIPA Ario (Iran)
- Production: 2012–2017

Body and chassis
- Body style: 4-door sedan
- Layout: Front-engine, front-wheel-drive
- Related: Toyota Premio

Powertrain
- Engine: 1.5 L 4A91 I4; 1.6 L 4A92 I4
- Transmission: 5-speed automatic 5-speed manual

Dimensions
- Wheelbase: 2,700 mm (106.3 in)
- Length: 4,565 mm (179.7 in)
- Width: 1,766 mm (69.5 in)
- Height: 1,493 mm (58.8 in)

The Zotye Z300 or Zotye Z360 is a compact sedan produced by Chinese auto maker Zotye Auto.

== Overview ==
The Zotye Z300 was unveiled at the 2012 Beijing Auto Show. Power comes from a Mitsubishi-sourced 1.5 L putting out 120 hp and 143 nm of torque through a 5-speed manual or 5-speed automatic powering the front wheels.

The Zotye Z300 is available in May 2012, shortly after the launch during the 2012 Beijing Auto Show with prices ranging from 62,900 yuan to 69,900 yuan.

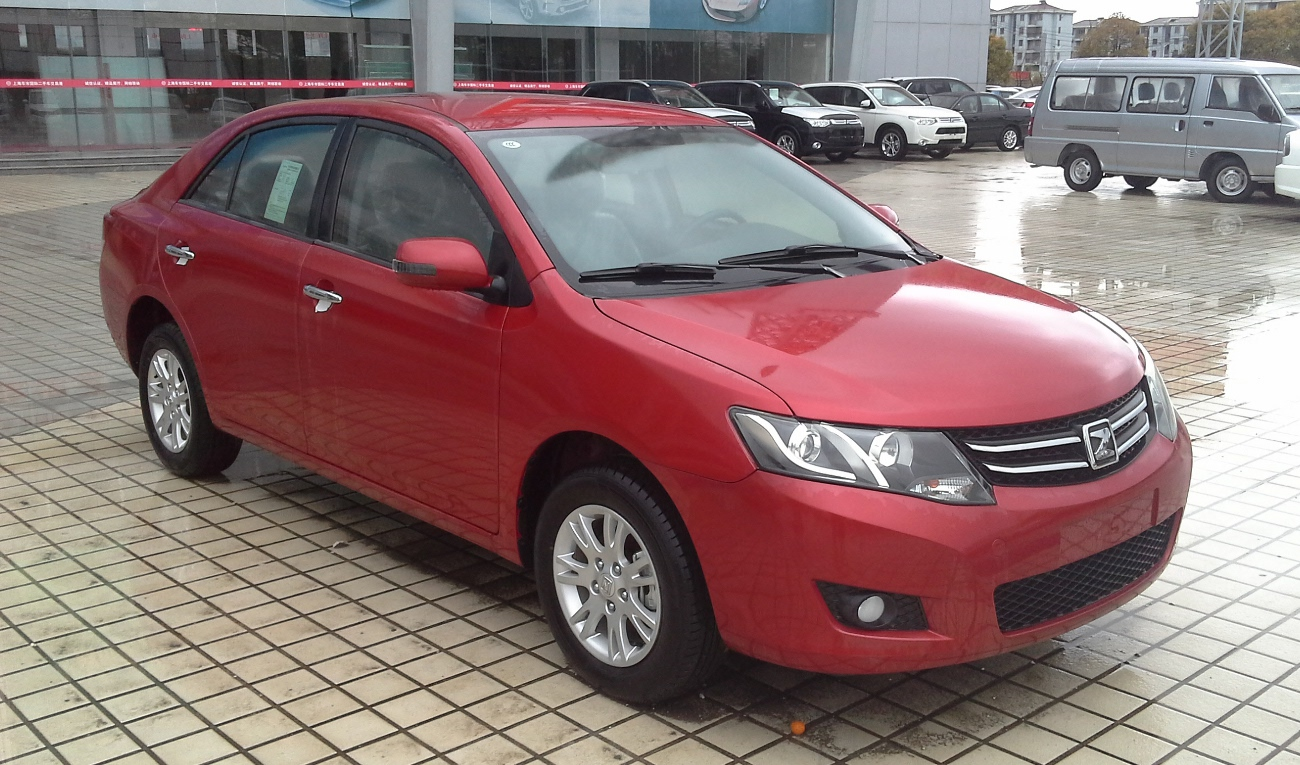
Zotye Z300 front

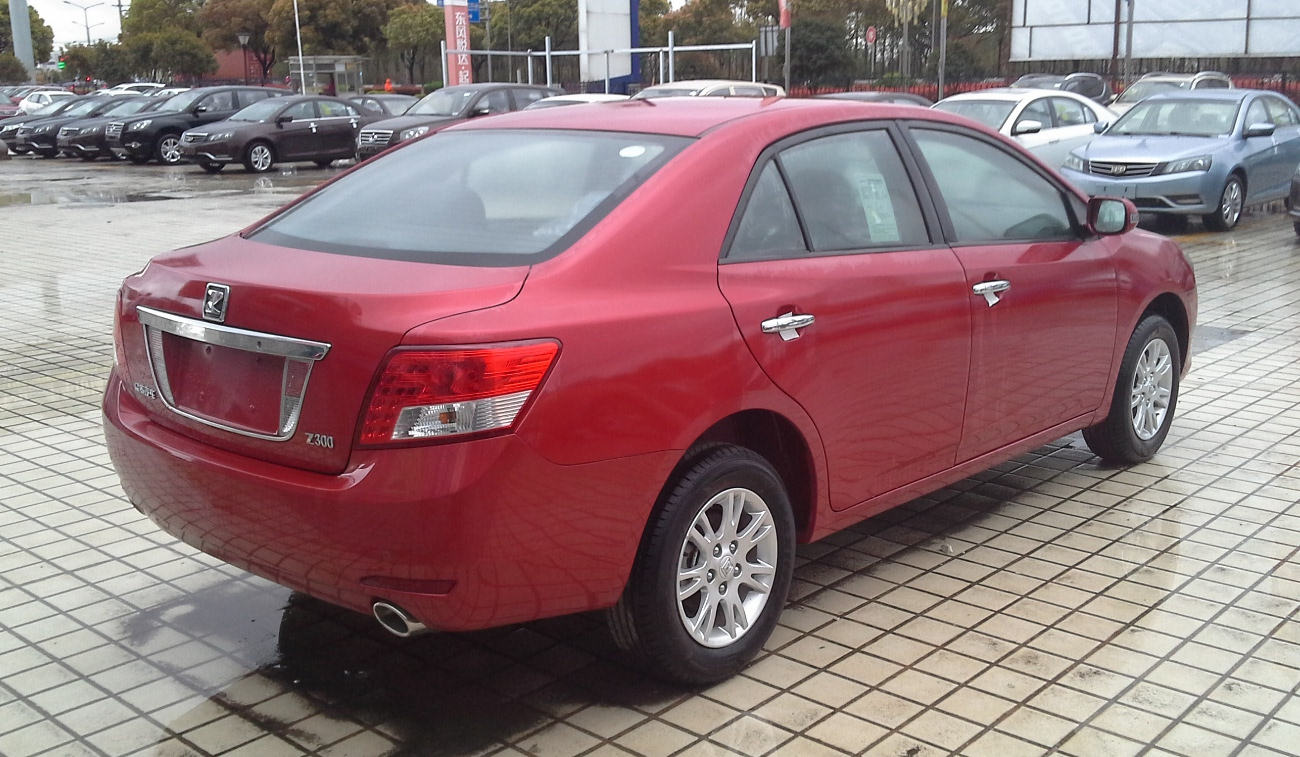
Zotye Z300 rear

=== Styling controversies ===
Styling wise the Zotye Z300 is especially controversial as the exterior design is a complete copy of the Toyota Allion.

=== 2014 facelift ===
A facelift was conducted in 2014 changing the front and rear DRG design, followed by a name change to Zotye Z360 shortly after.

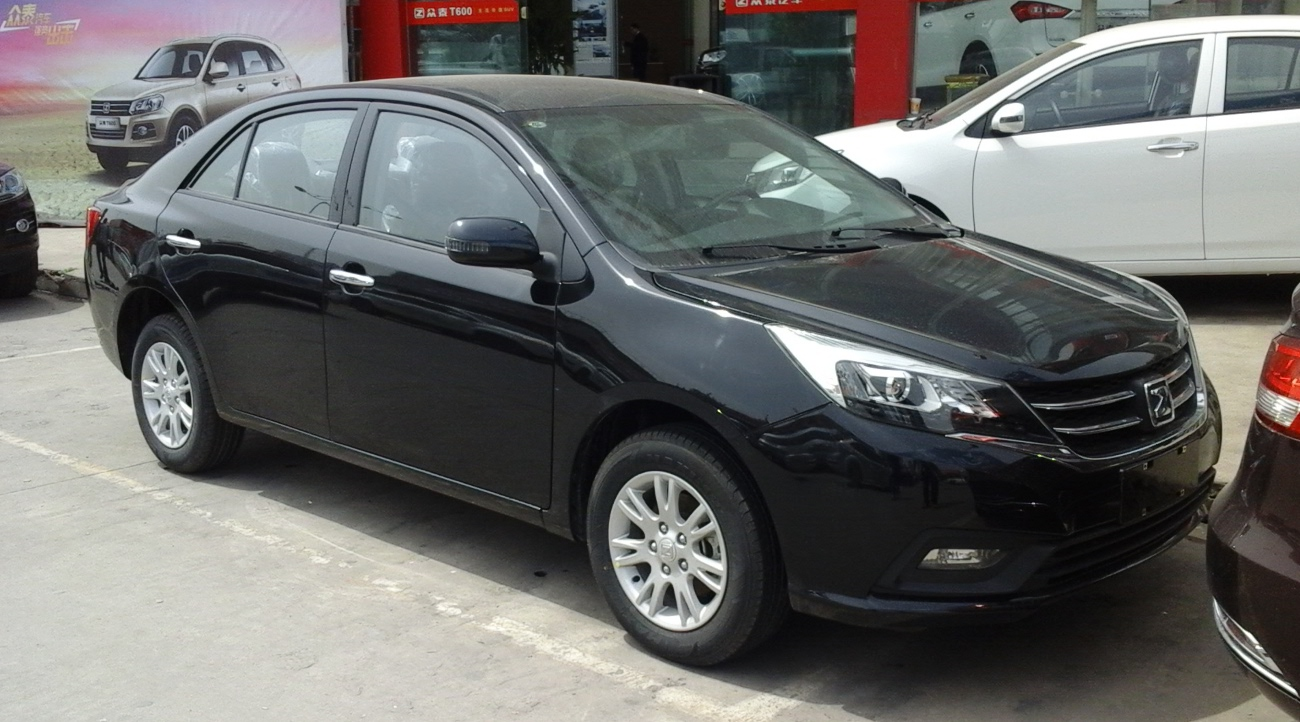
Zotye Z300 facelift front

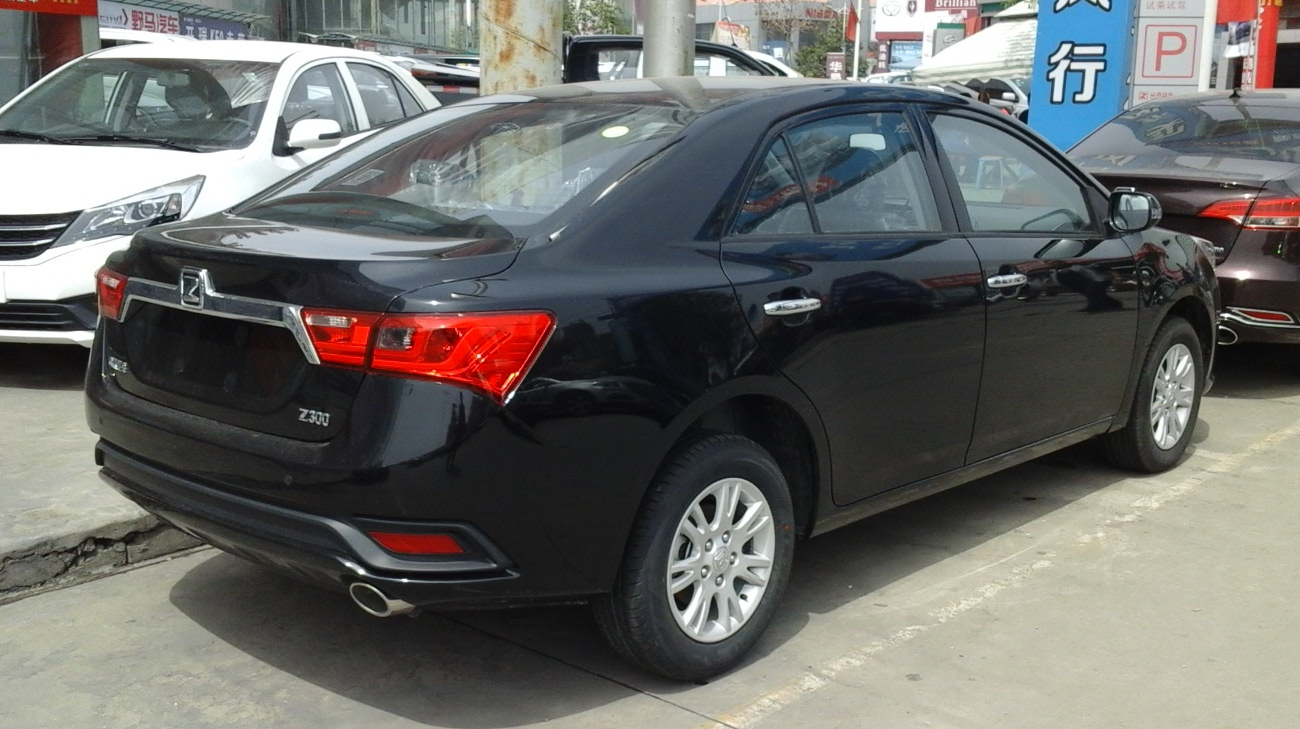
Zotye Z300 facelift rear

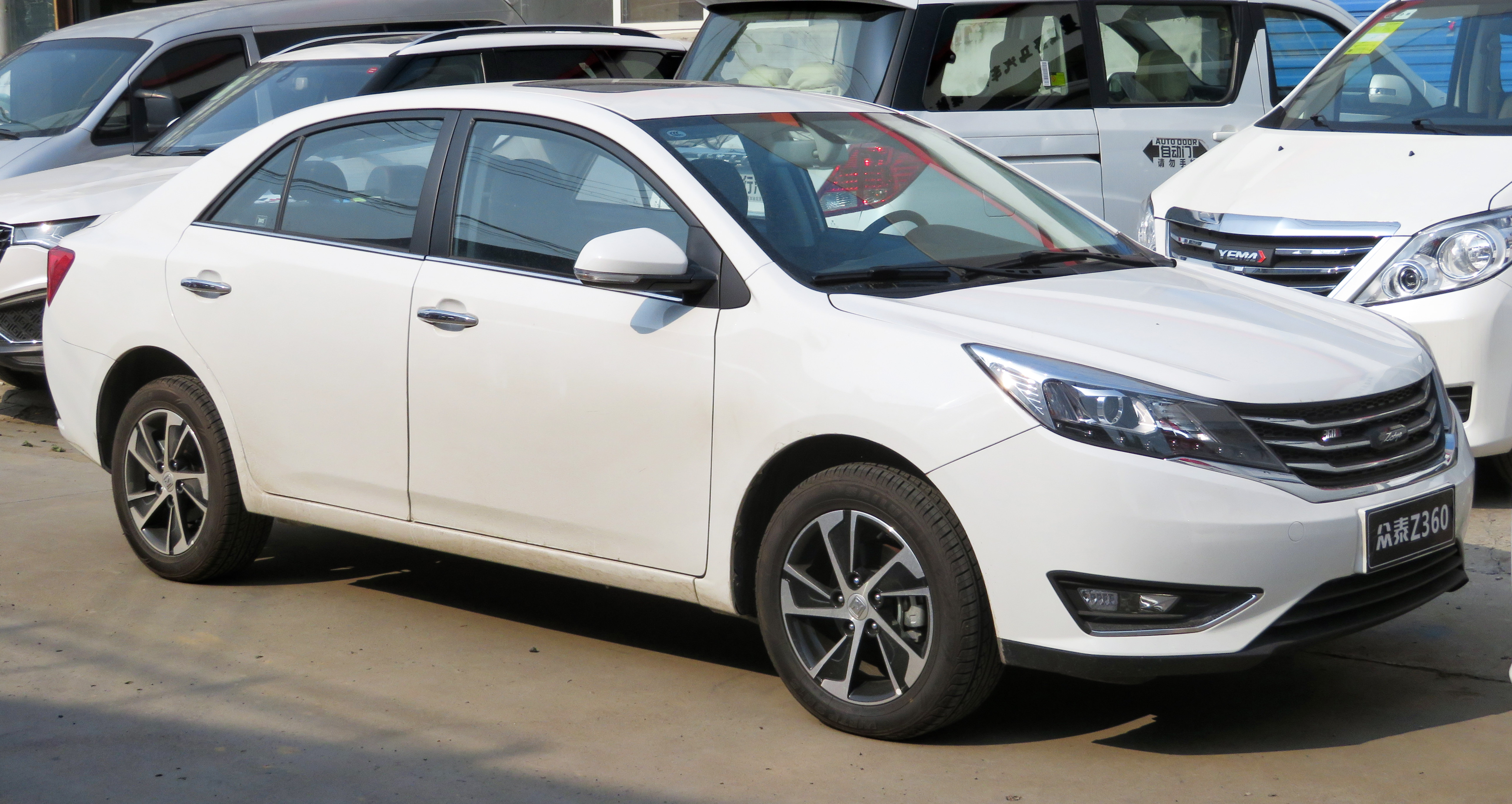
Zotye Z360 (2017)

=== Export markets ===
The Zotye Z300 is sold in Iran as the SAIPA Ario, where it is available with a 1.5- or 1.6-liter engines, available in two trim levels: Elegant and TM.
