= E200 =

E200 may refer to:

== Electronics ==
- Acer beTouch E200, a smartphone
- PowerPC e200, a processor core
- Sansa e200 series, a portable media player developed by SanDisk

== Vehicles ==
=== Automobiles ===
- Baojun E200, a Chinese electric microcar
- JMEV E200, a Chinese electric city car
- Zotye E200, a Chinese electric microcar

=== Trains ===
- KiHa E200, a Japanese train type
- A locomotive manufactured by GE Transportation for Taiwan Railways Administration

=== Buses ===
- ADL Enviro200, a British Bus type

== Other uses ==
- Sorbic acid, a food additive
- Estonia 200, a political party in Estonia
