= Changan BenBen =

Chinese city car

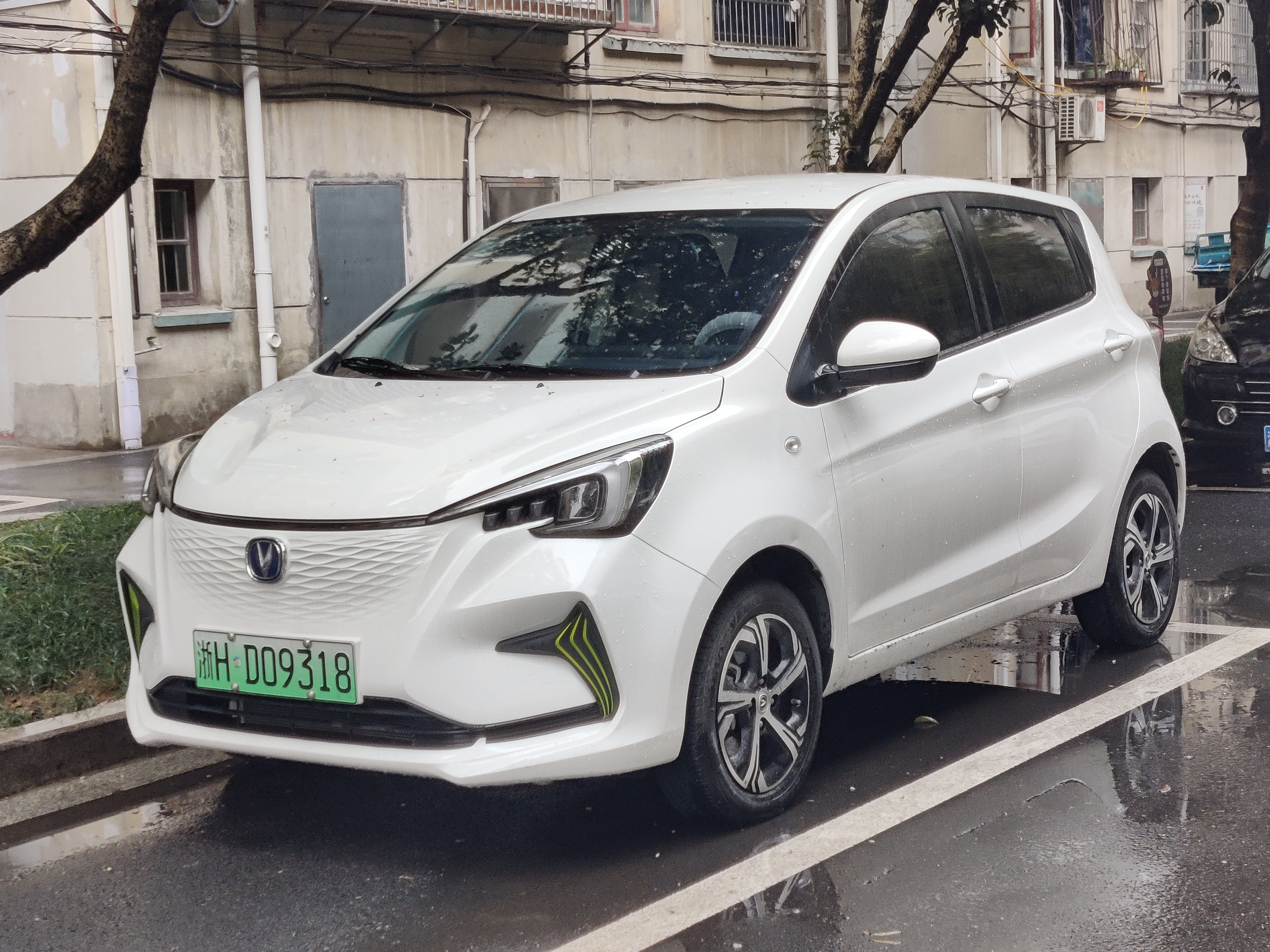
- Changan BenBen E-Star

Overview
- Manufacturer: Changan Automobile
- Also called: Changan Benni; Changan BenBen Love; Changan BenBen Mini; JMEV E200 (electric rebadged variant of the BenBen Mini); Hawtai Lusheng S1 EV160B (electric rebadged variant of the BenBen Mini)
- Production: 2006–2023
- Assembly: China: Chongqing

Body and chassis
- Class: City car (A)
- Body style: 5-door hatchback

The Changan BenBen (Chinese: 长安奔奔; pinyin: cháng ān bēn bēn) or sometimes Changan Benni is a 5-door city car hatchback produced by Changan Automobile.

== BenBen I ==
BenBen I
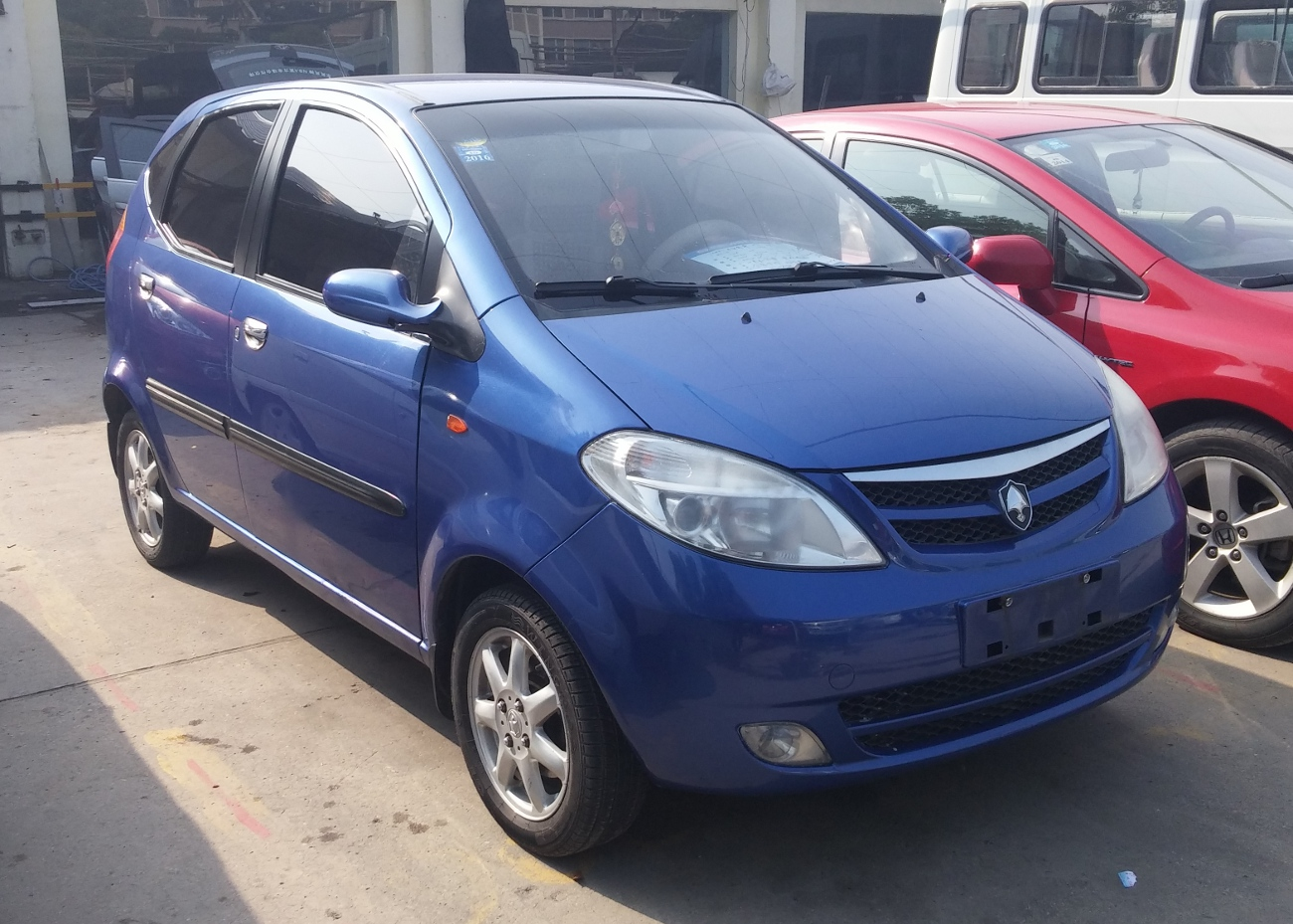

Overview
- Manufacturer: Changan
- Also called: Chana BenBen; Changan BenBen Love; Changan CV6
- Production: 2006–2013
- Model years: 2006–2013
- Assembly: Chongqing
- Designer: I.DE.A Institute

Body and chassis
- Class: city car (A)
- Body style: 5-door hatchback
- Layout: Front-engine, front-wheel-drive

Powertrain
- Engine: 1.0 L JL465QG I4 (petrol); 1.3 L JL474Q2 I4 (petrol)
- Transmission: 5 speed manual

Dimensions
- Wheelbase: 2,365 mm (93.1 in)
- Length: 3,525 mm (138.8 in)
- Width: 1,650 mm (65.0 in)
- Height: 1,550 mm (61.0 in)

The first generation Changan BenBen was also called the BenBen i. Price starts from 34.000 yuan. In 2010, the model went through a mid-cycle facelift with a redesigned grille, bumpers, tailgate, and headlamps and was called the BenBen Love then. Engine of the first generation Changan BenBen is a 1.3-litre engine with 63 kW (84 hp; 86 PS) and 110 N⋅m (81 lb⋅ft; 11 kg⋅m) mated to a manual transmission.

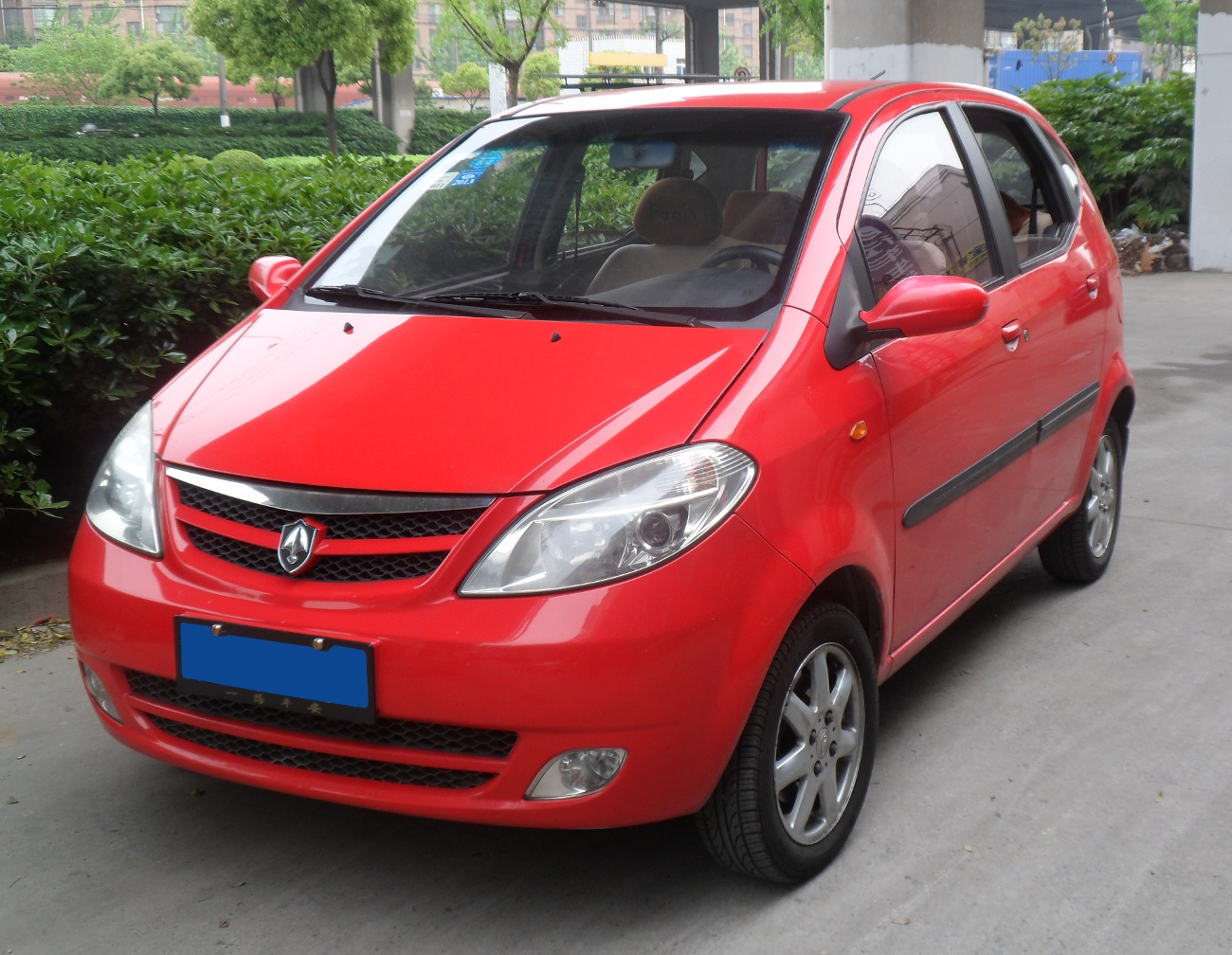
Front view of the Changan BenBen I.

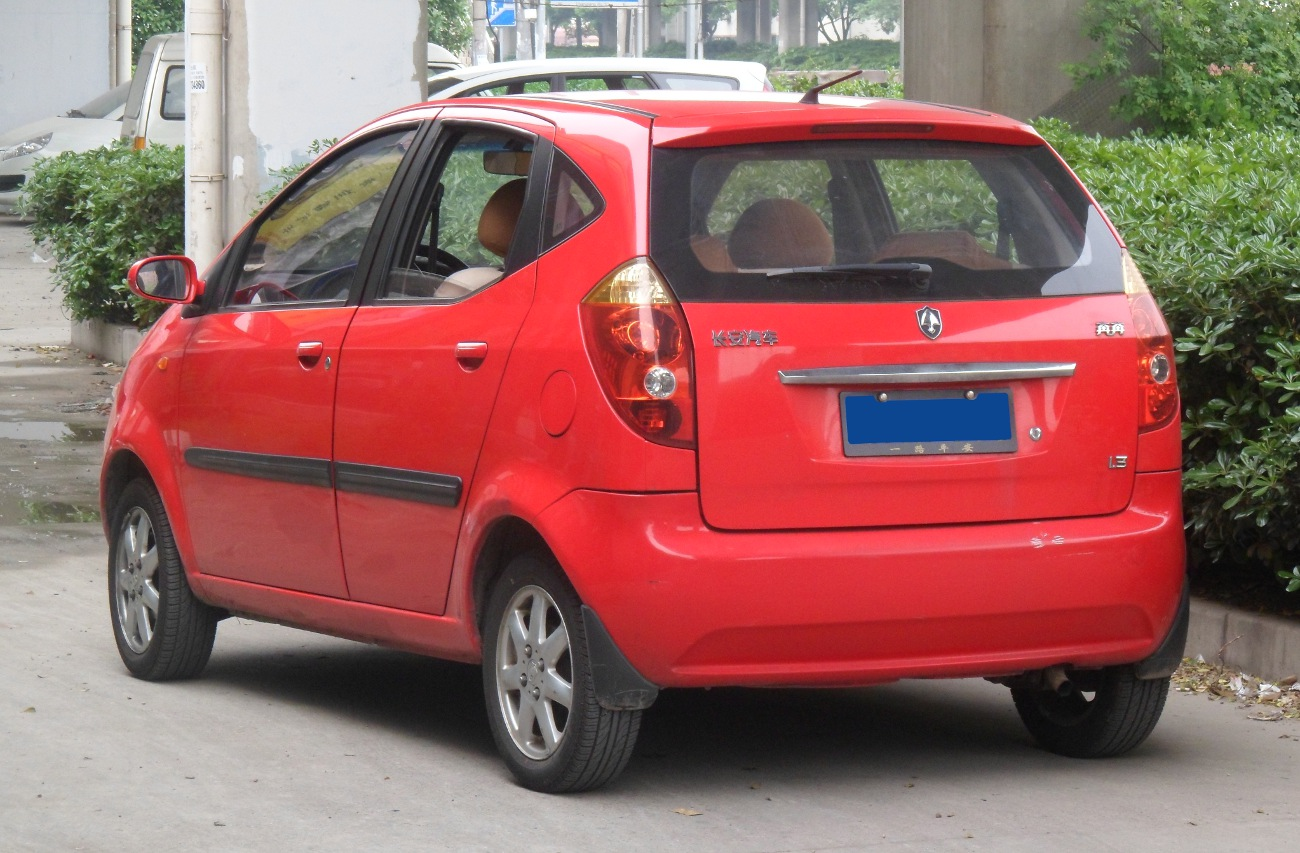
Rear view of the Changan BenBen I.

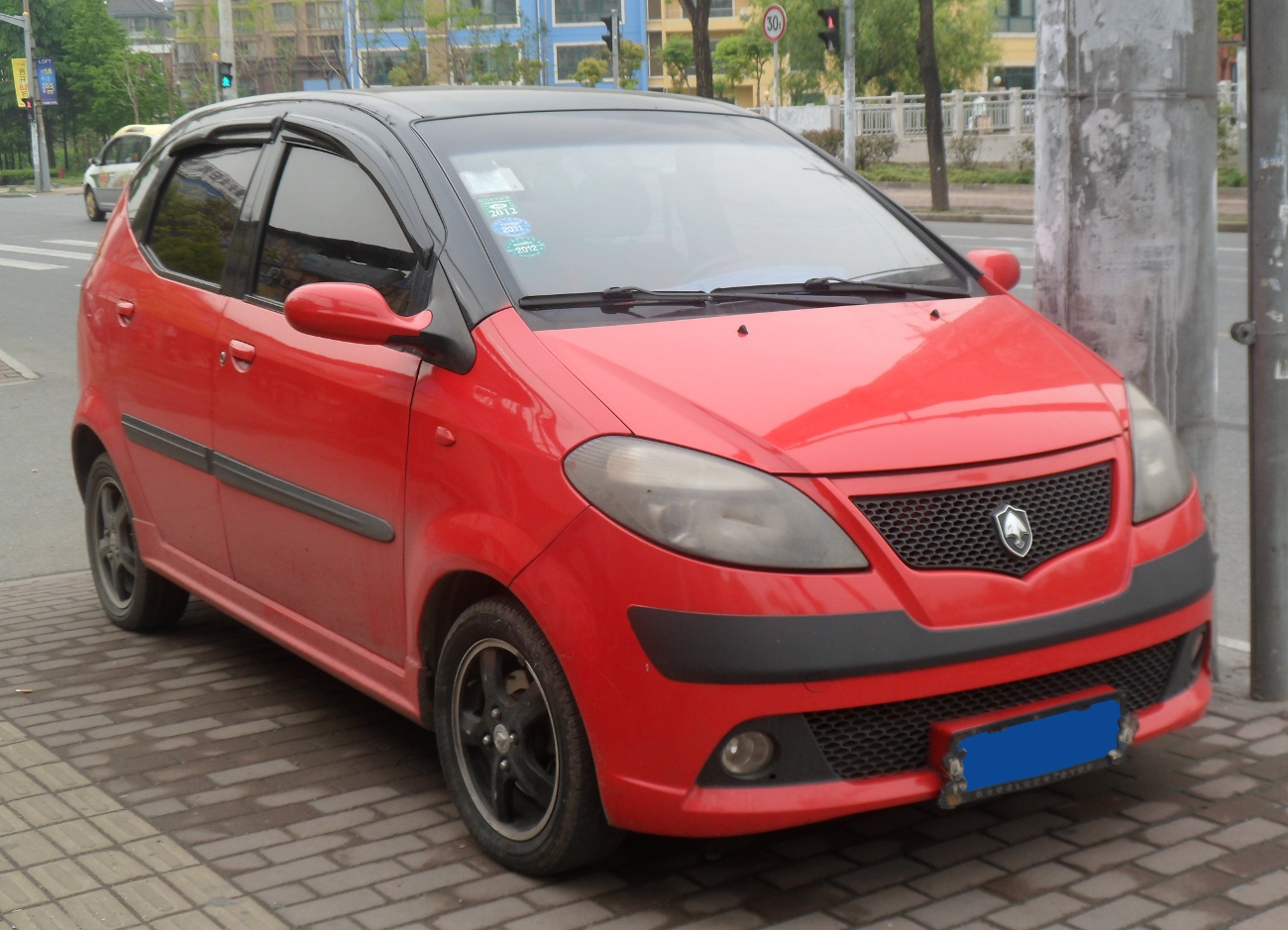
Front view of the Changan BenBen Sport I.

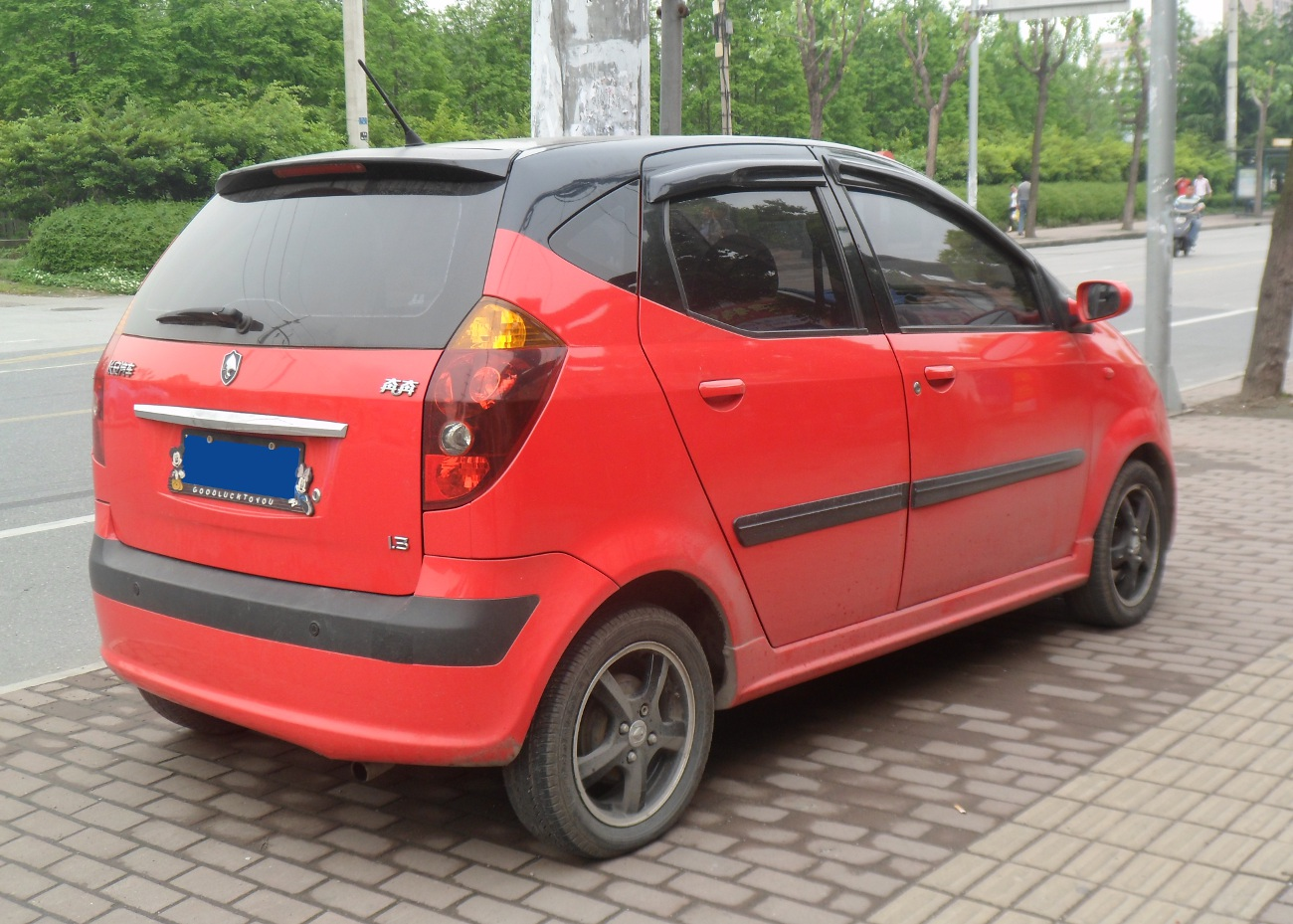
Rear view of the Changan BenBen Sport I.

== Changan BenBen Mini ==
BenBen Mini
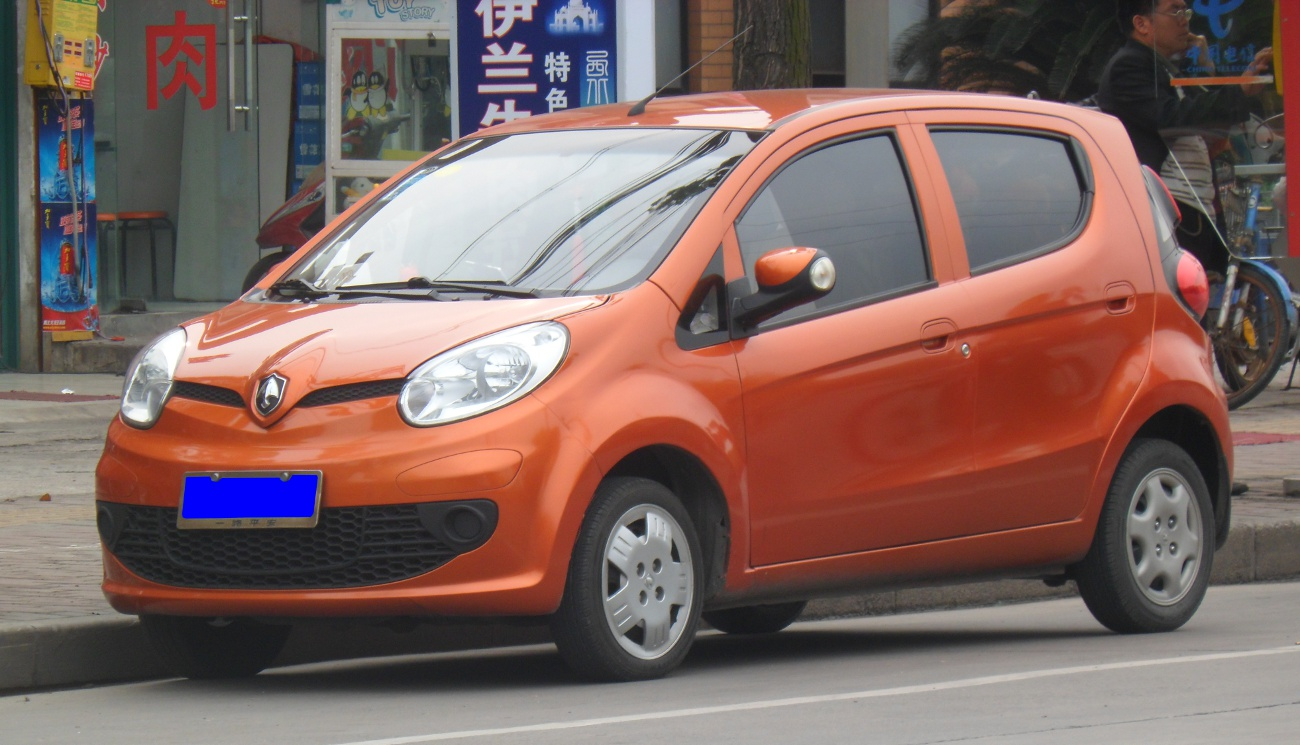

Overview
- Manufacturer: Changan
- Also called: JMEV E200; Hawtai Lusheng S1 EV160B
- Production: 2010–2013
- Model years: 2010–2013

Body and chassis
- Class: city car (A)
- Body style: 5-door hatchback
- Layout: Front-engine, front-wheel-drive

Powertrain
- Engine: 1.0 L JL466Q5 I4 (petrol)
- Transmission: 5 speed manual 5 speed automatic

Dimensions
- Wheelbase: 2,345 mm (92.3 in)
- Length: 3,580 mm (140.9 in)
- Width: 1,570 mm (61.8 in)
- Height: 1,490 mm (58.7 in)

In 2010, the original Changan BenBen was replaced by two cars, the BenBen Mini and the BenBen Love, essentially a facelifted original BenBen and will be available as a cheaper alternative next to the BenBen Mini. The only engine for the BenBen Mini is a 1.0-litre petrol engine producing 51 kW (68 hp; 69 PS) at 5600 rpm and 90 N⋅m (66 lb⋅ft; 9 kg⋅m) at 4600rpm. The top speed of the BenBen Mini is 158 km/h (98 mph). The prices of the BenBen Mini ranges from RMB 35,000 to 45,000.

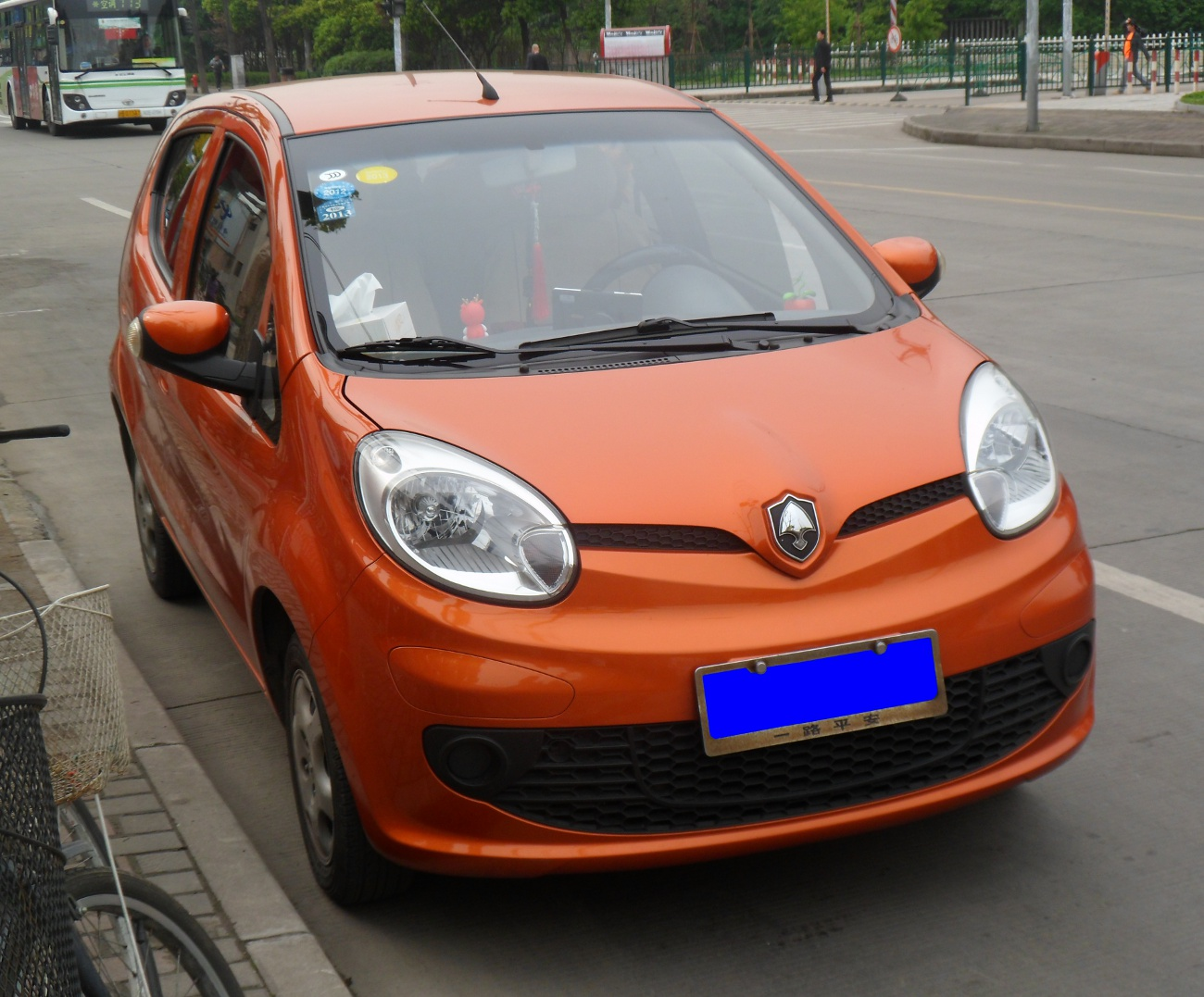
Front view of the Changan BenBen Mini.

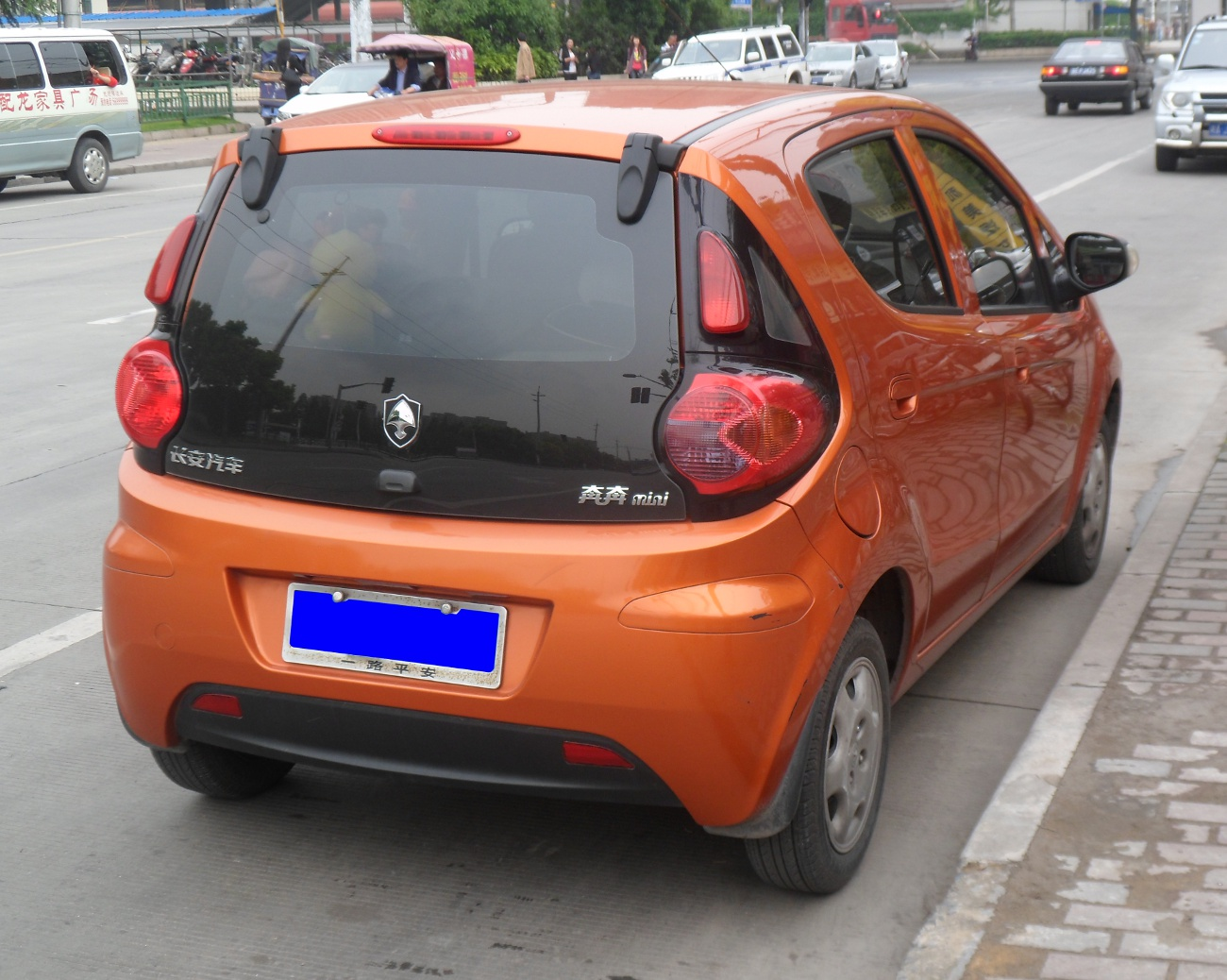
Rear view of the Changan BenBen Mini.

Revealed on the 2011 Guangzhou Auto Show, a facelift was conducted for the Changan BenBen Mini, changing the bumper and light unit designs.

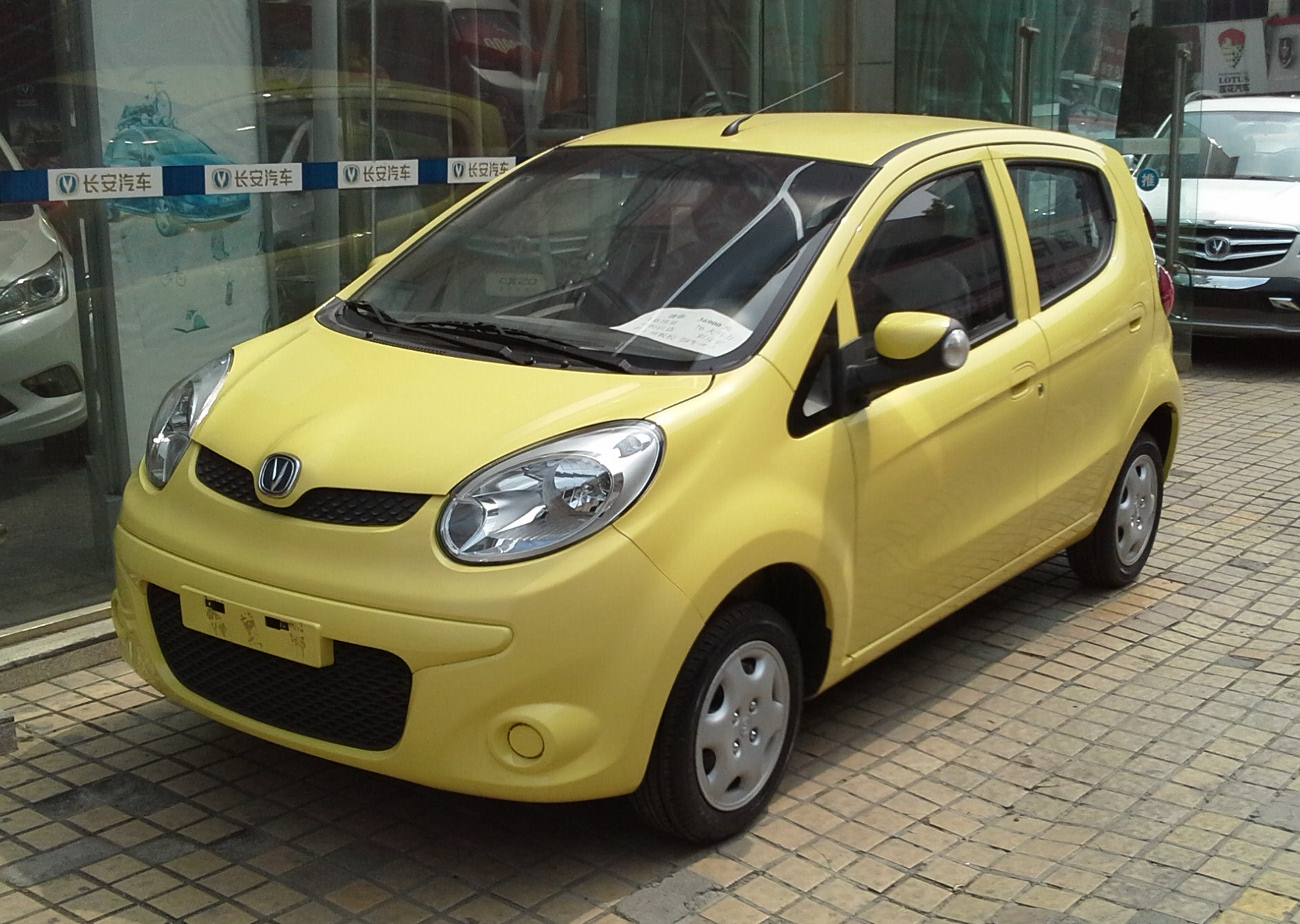
Front view of the Changan BenBen Mini facelift.

=== Hawtai Lusheng S1 EV160B ===
After the discontinuation of the Changan BenBen Mini, Hawtai acquired the production licence of the hatchback and produced a rebadged electric version called the Lusheng S1 EV160B under the Lusheng passenger car series with no further styling changes done.

=== JMEV E200/ E200L and JMEV E200S/ E200N ===
Through Jiangling Motors Holding, a joint venture by Jiangling Motors Group and Changan Auto, JMEV launched the E200 or E200L, a hatchback based on the Changan BenBen. The E200 has a length of 3,805 millimetres (149.8 in), a width of 1,560 millimetres (61 in), a height of 1,485 millimetres (58.5 in) and a wheelbase of 2,345 millimetres (92.3 in). The 17 kWh battery pack is coupled to an electric motor delivering a power of 30 kilowatts (41 PS) and a torque of 150 newton-metres (111 lb⋅ft). The estimated range is 154 kilometres (96 mi). Suspension is made up of MacPherson struts on front and trailing arms on rear.

Versions with more powerful batteries, called the E200S or E200N, were introduced in 2018 and increased the vehicle range up to an estimated 302 kilometres (188 mi).The E200S and E200N features restyled front and rear end and has a length of 3,640 millimetres (143 in), a width of 1,570 millimetres (62 in), a height of 1,490 millimetres (59 in) and a wheelbase of 2,345 millimetres (92.3 in). The electric motor delivers a power of 30 kilowatts (41 PS) and a torque of 150 newton-metres (111 lb⋅ft).

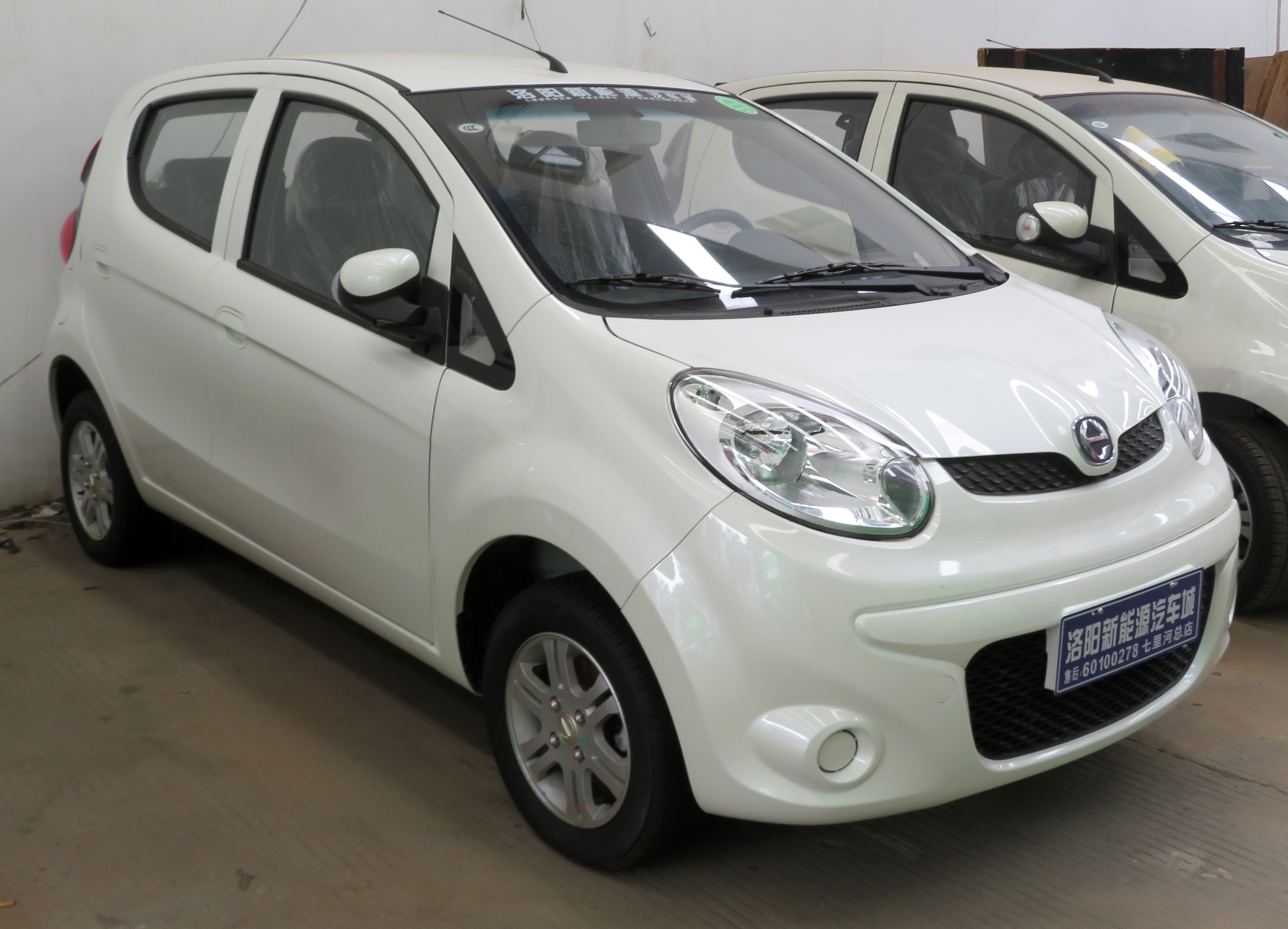
Front view of the Jiangling (JMEV) E200

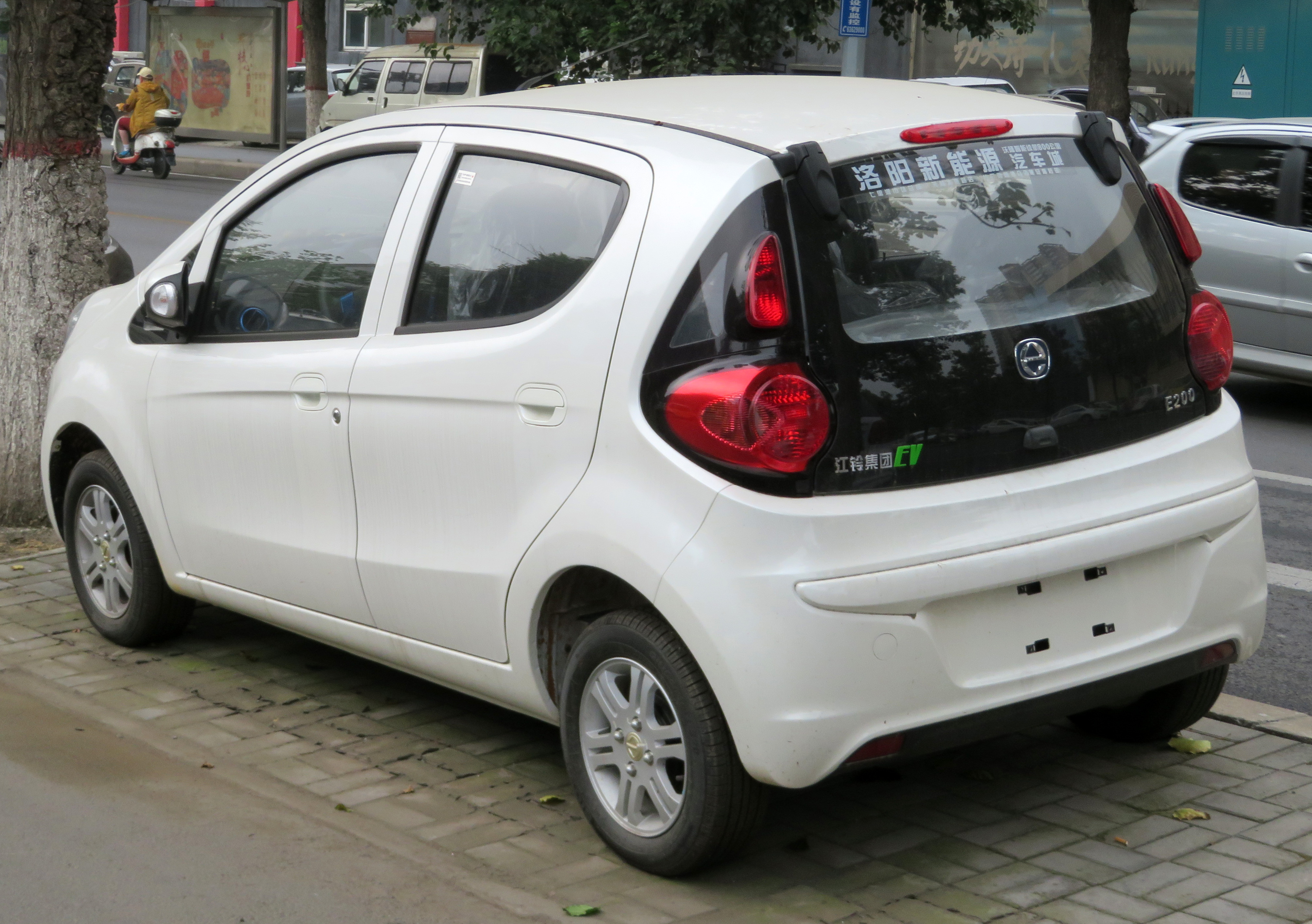
Rear view of the Jiangling (JMEV) E200
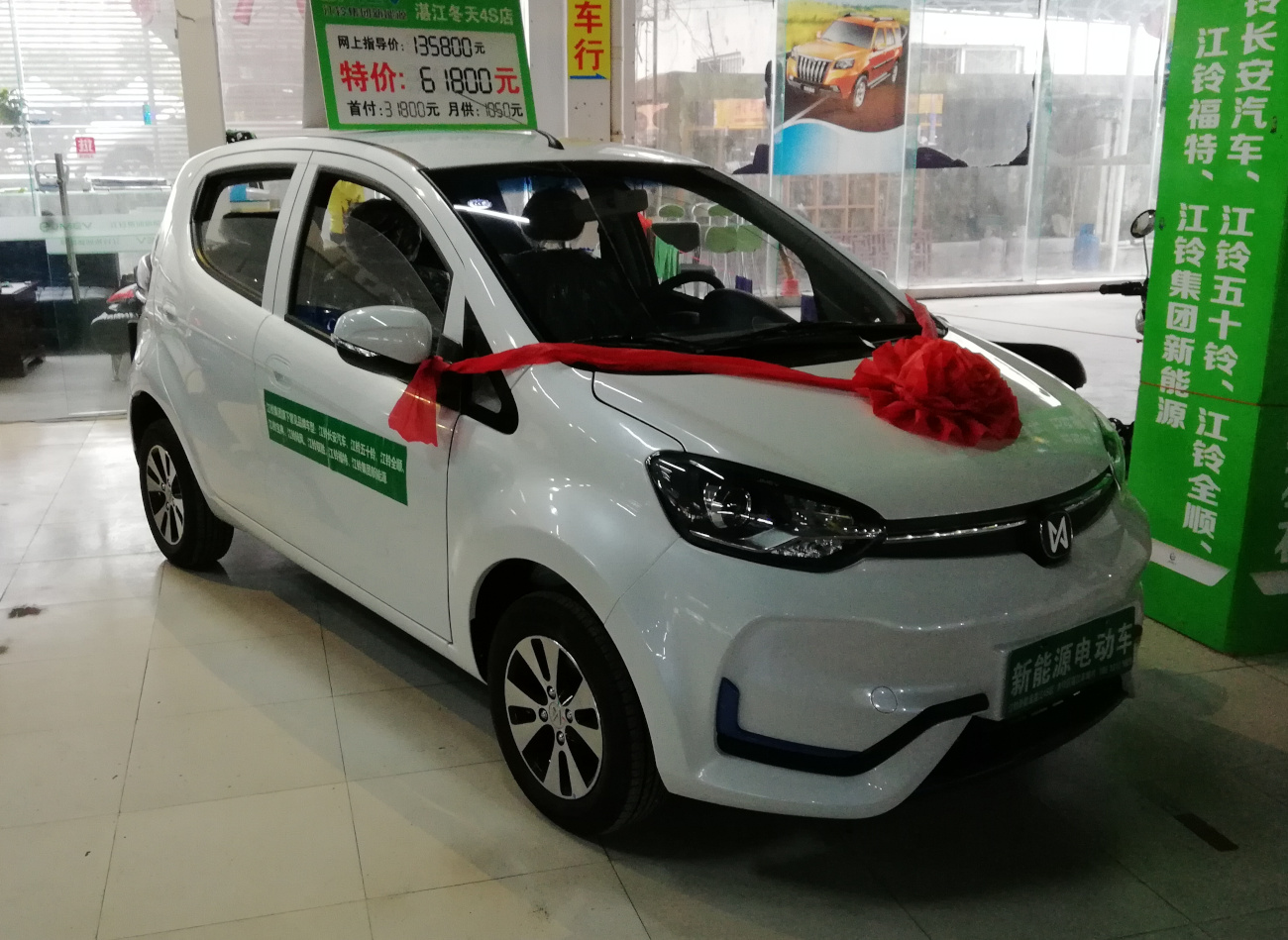
Front view of the Jiangling (JMEV) E200S

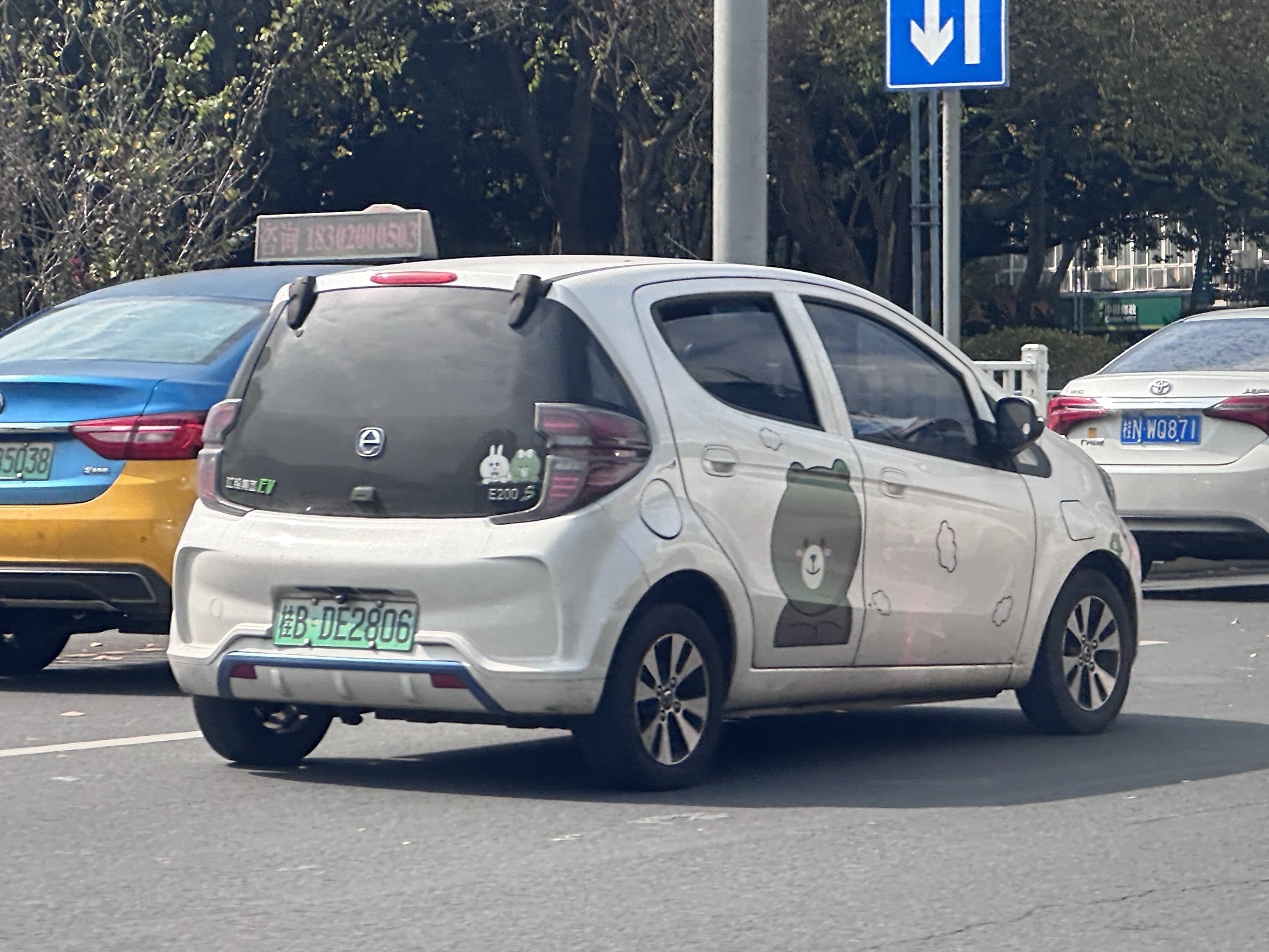
Rear view of the Jiangling (JMEV) E200S

== Changan BenBen II ==
Changan BenBen II
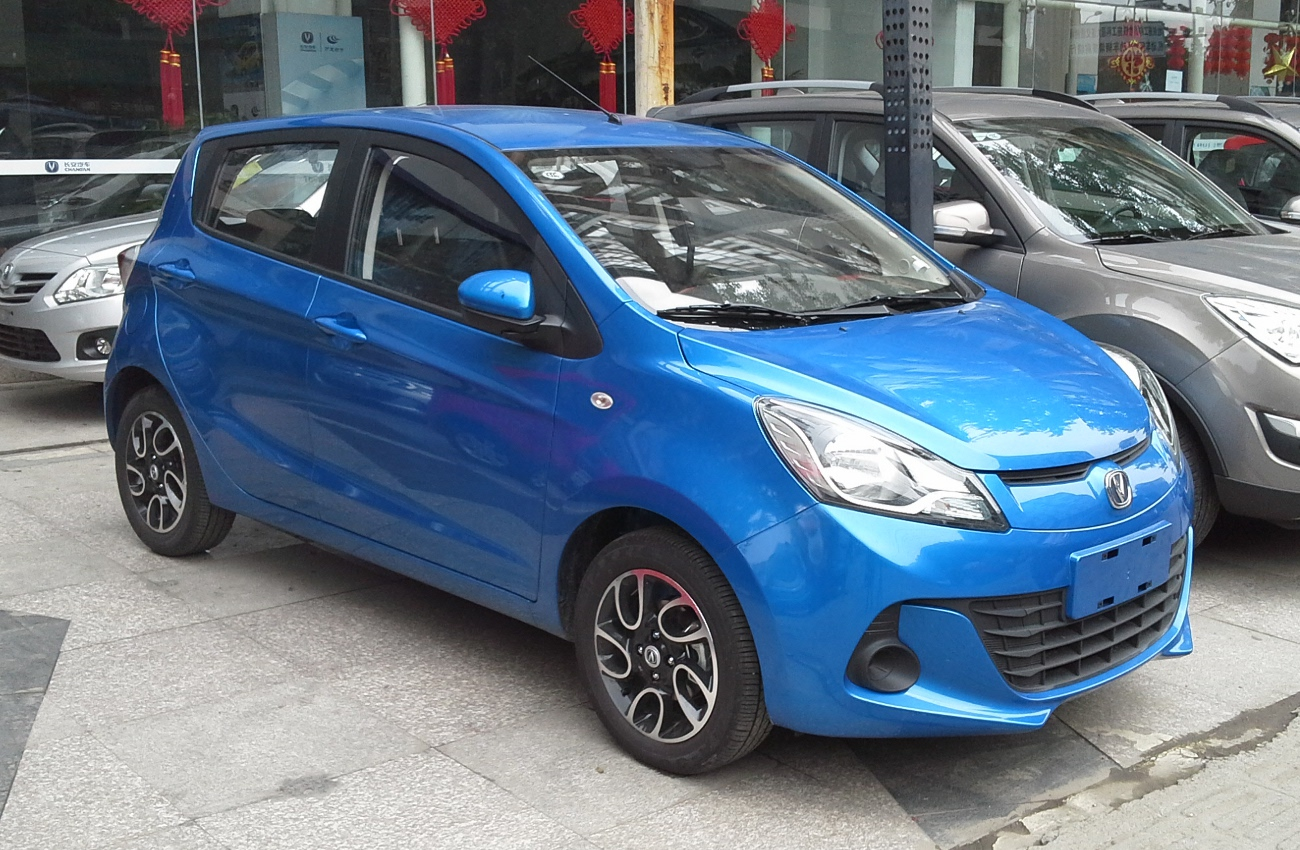

Overview
- Manufacturer: Changan
- Production: 2014–2023
- Model years: 2014–2023

Body and chassis
- Class: city car (A)
- Body style: 5-door hatchback
- Layout: Front-engine, front-wheel-drive

Powertrain
- Engine: 1.4 L BlueCore I3 (petrol)
- Transmission: 5-speed manual 5-speed automatic

Dimensions
- Wheelbase: 2,410 mm (94.9 in)
- Length: 3,730 mm (146.9 in)
- Width: 1,650 mm (65.0 in)
- Height: 1,530 mm (60.2 in)

The Changan BenBen II was launched on the China car market in 2014 with prices for the Changan BenBen II ranging from 47,900 yuan to 56,900 yuan. The new BenBen debuted during the 2013 Guangzhou Auto Show. The power of the second generation Ben Ben comes from a 1.4-litre engine with 100 horsepower (75 kW; 101 PS) and 136 N⋅m (100 lb⋅ft; 14 kg⋅m), mated to a 5-speed manual transmission or a 4-speed automatic transmission. A 1.2-litre engine with about 80 horsepower (60 kW; 81 PS) was added to the line-up later. The top speed is 156 km/h (97 mph) and fuel consumption is 5.6 litres per 100 kilometres (50 mpg_{‑imp}; 42 mpg_{‑US}) according to officials.

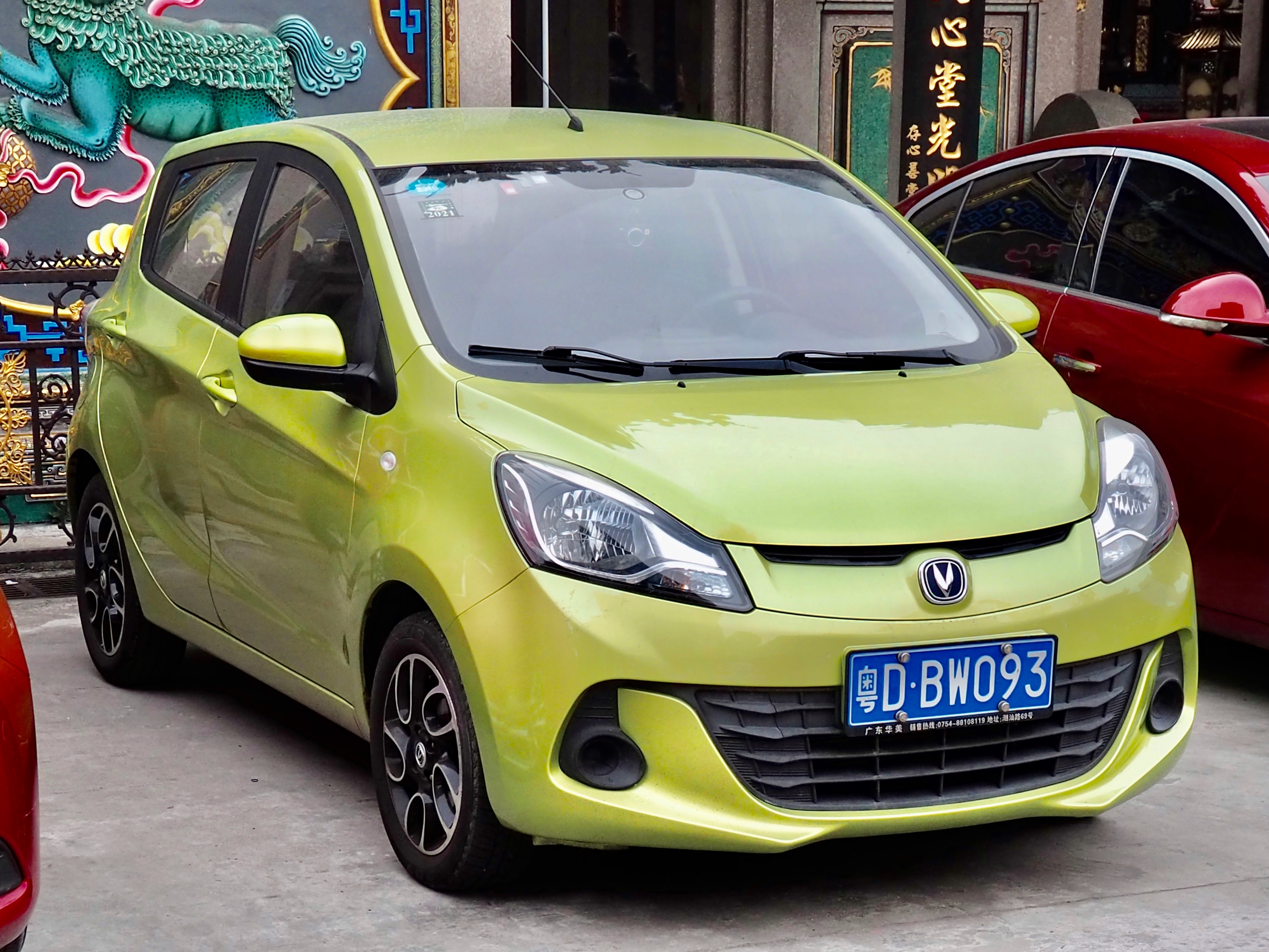
Front view of the Changan BenBen II.

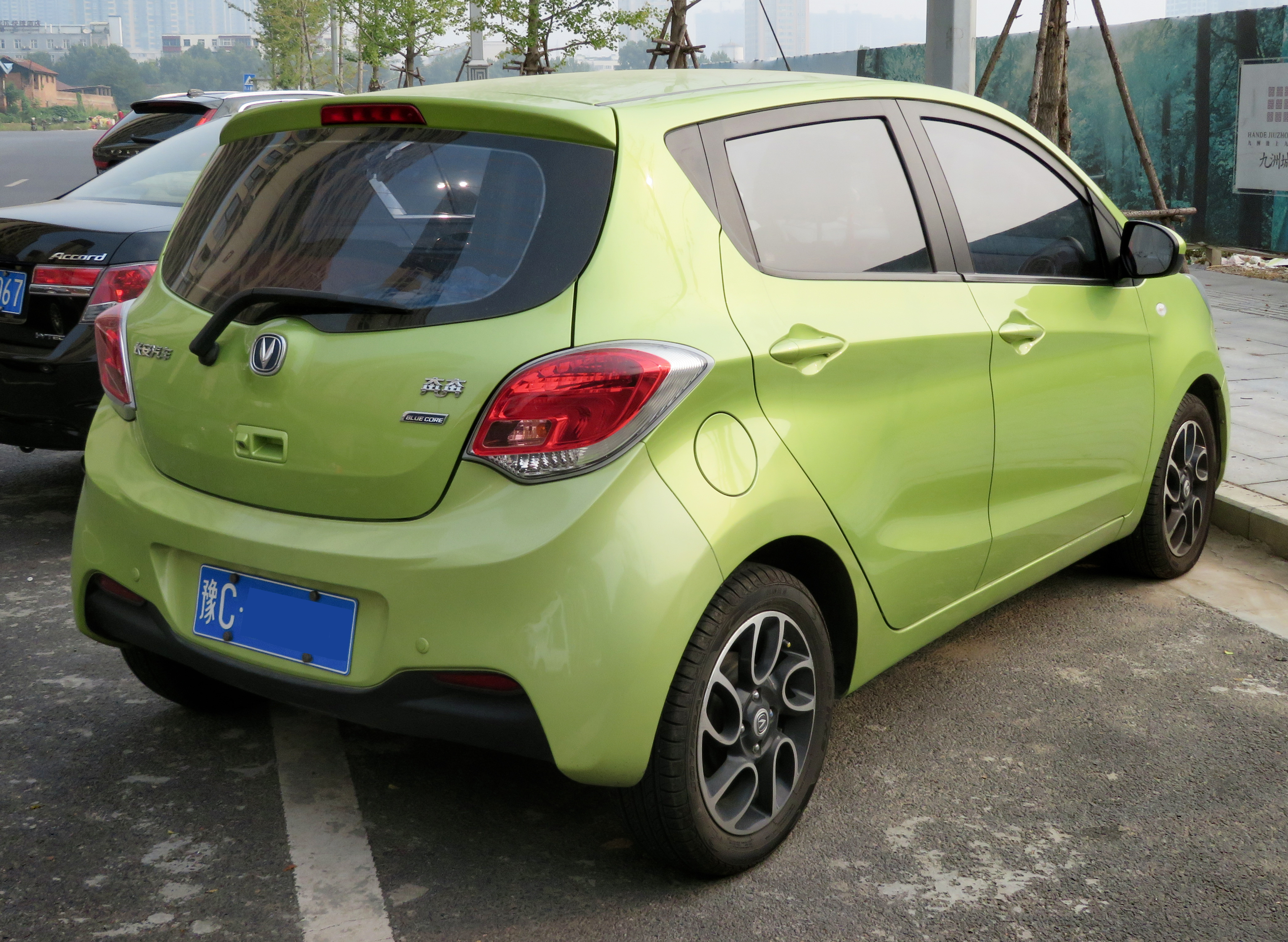
Rear view of the Changan BenBen II.

=== Changan BenBen EV ===
Based on the petrol-powered Changan BenBen, the BenBen EV is powered by an electric motor producing 75 horsepower (56 kW; 76 PS) and 165 N⋅m (122 lb⋅ft; 17 kg⋅m) of torque. The BenBen EV had a 125 km/h (78 mph) top speed and a range of 200 kilometres (120 mi).

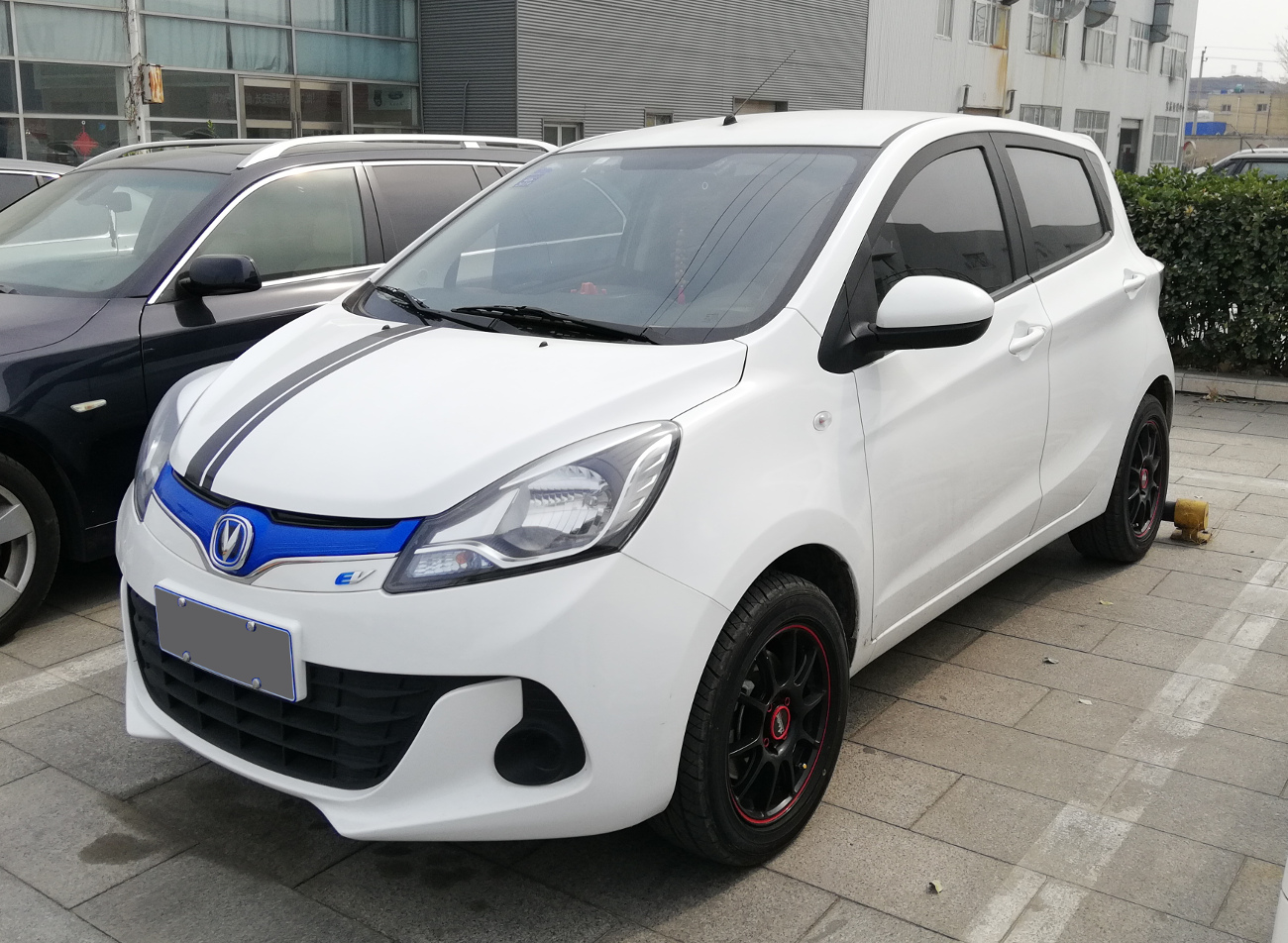
Front view of the Changan BenBen EV.

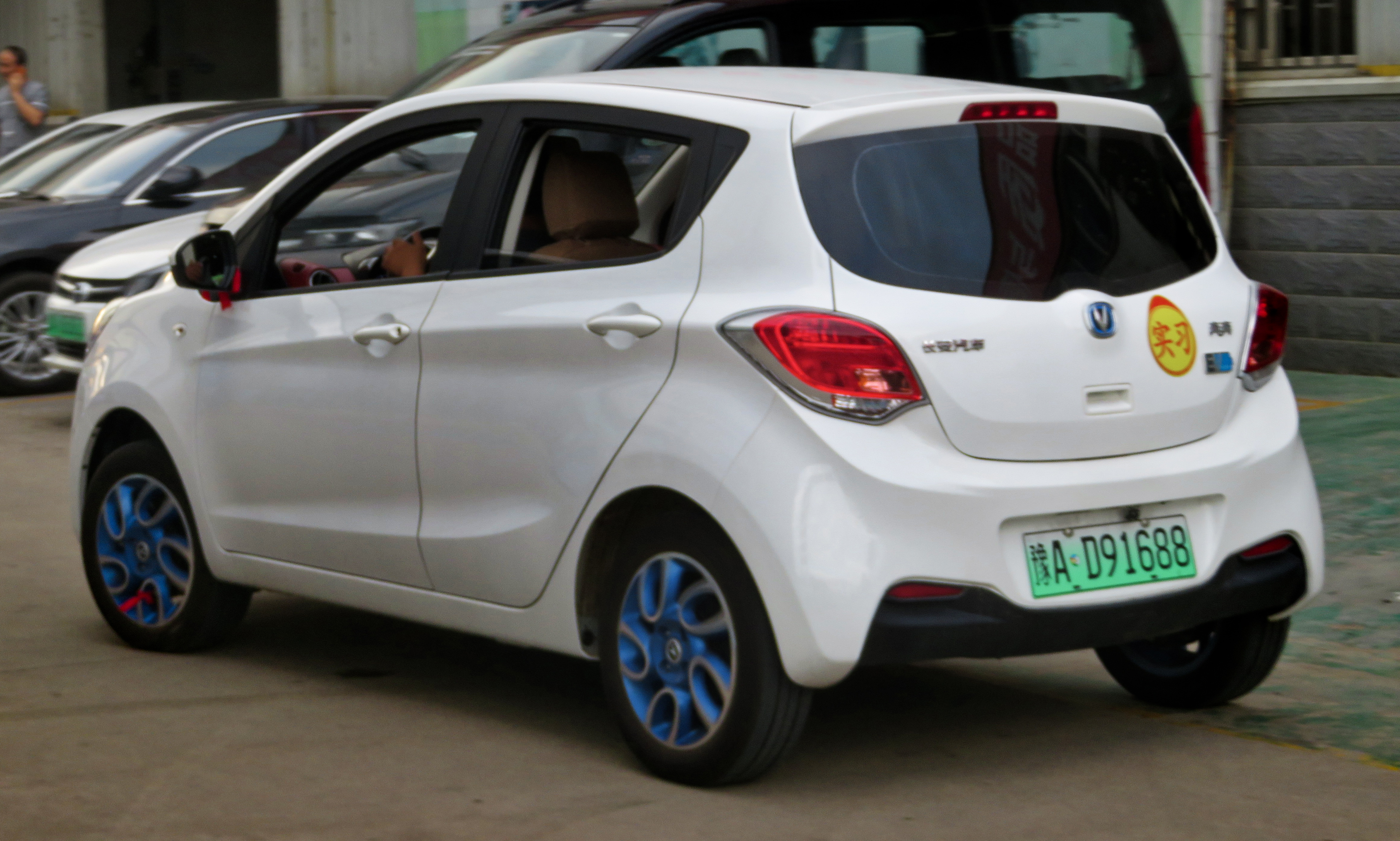
Rear view of the Changan BenBen EV.

=== Changan BenBen E-Star ===
From 2020, the electric BenBen was replaced by the BenBen E-Star. The BenBen E-Star is the facelift version of the BenBen EV, and just like the pre-facelift model, a 75-horsepower (56 kW; 76 PS) and 170 N⋅m (125 lb⋅ft; 17 kg⋅m) electric motor drives the front wheels. The battery pack has a capacity of 32.2 kWh (116 MJ), capable of supplying the BenBen E-Star up to a NEDC range of 300 kilometres (190 mi).

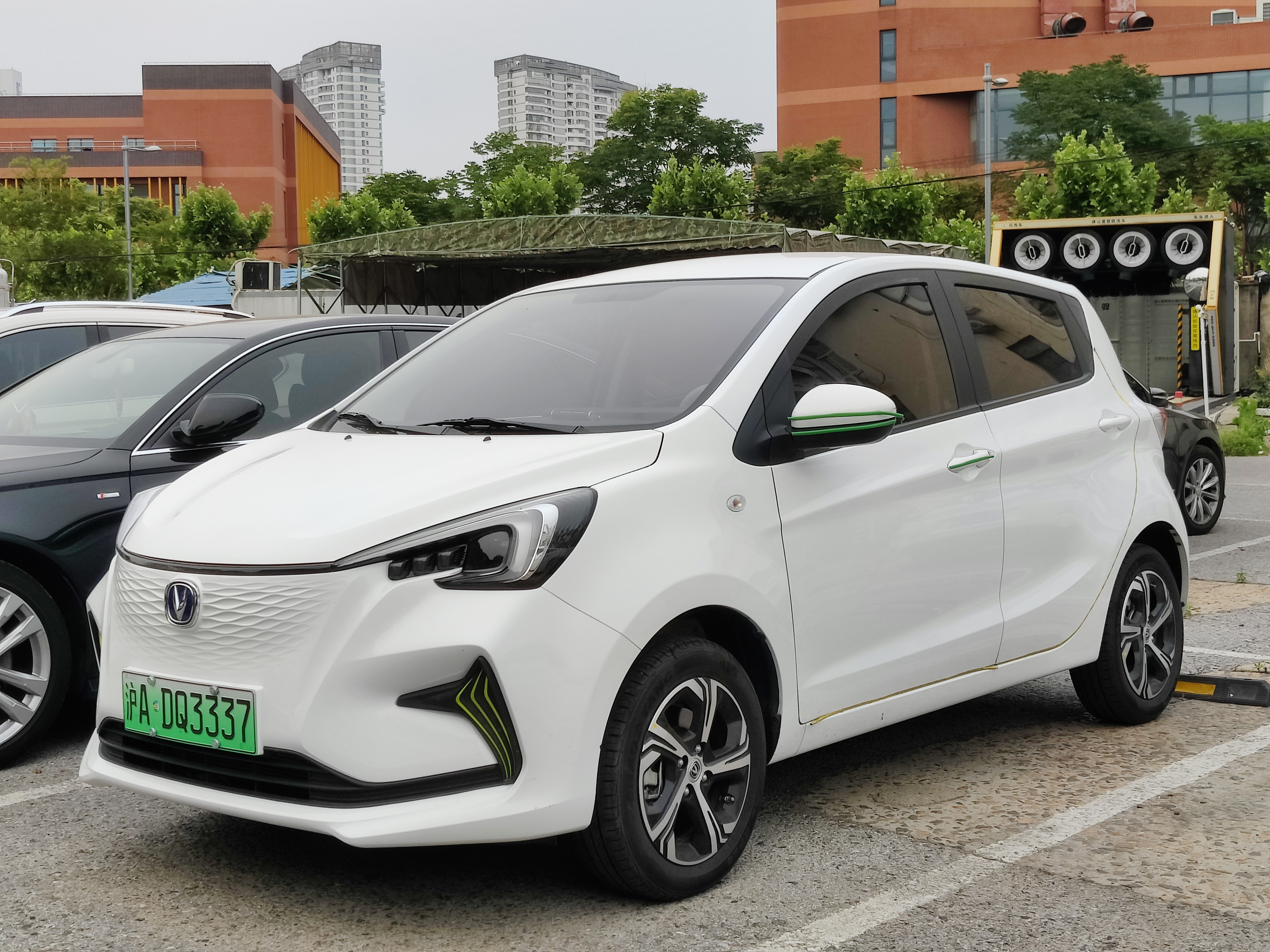
Front view of the Changan BenBen E-Star.

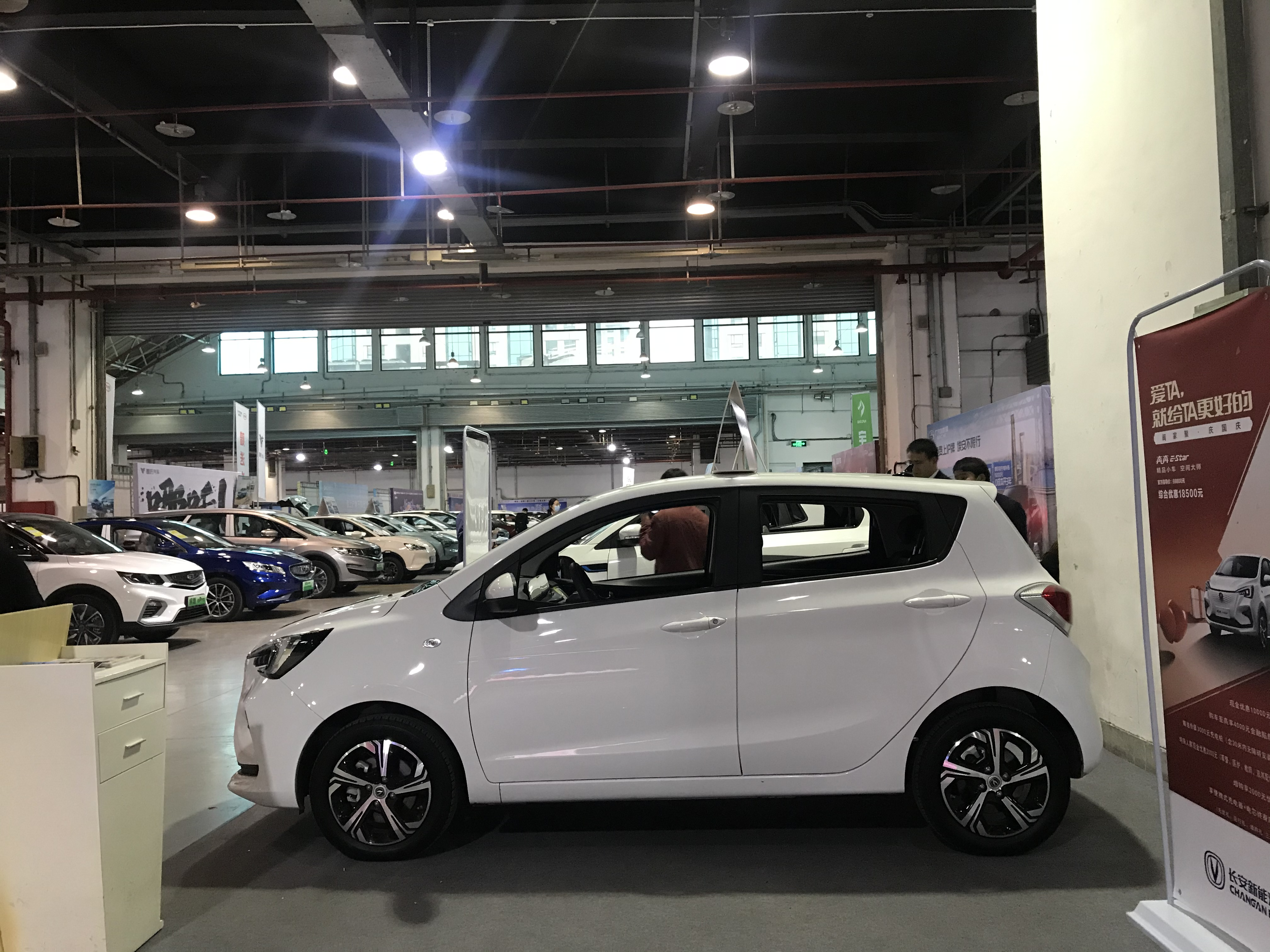
Side view of the Changan BenBen E-Star.

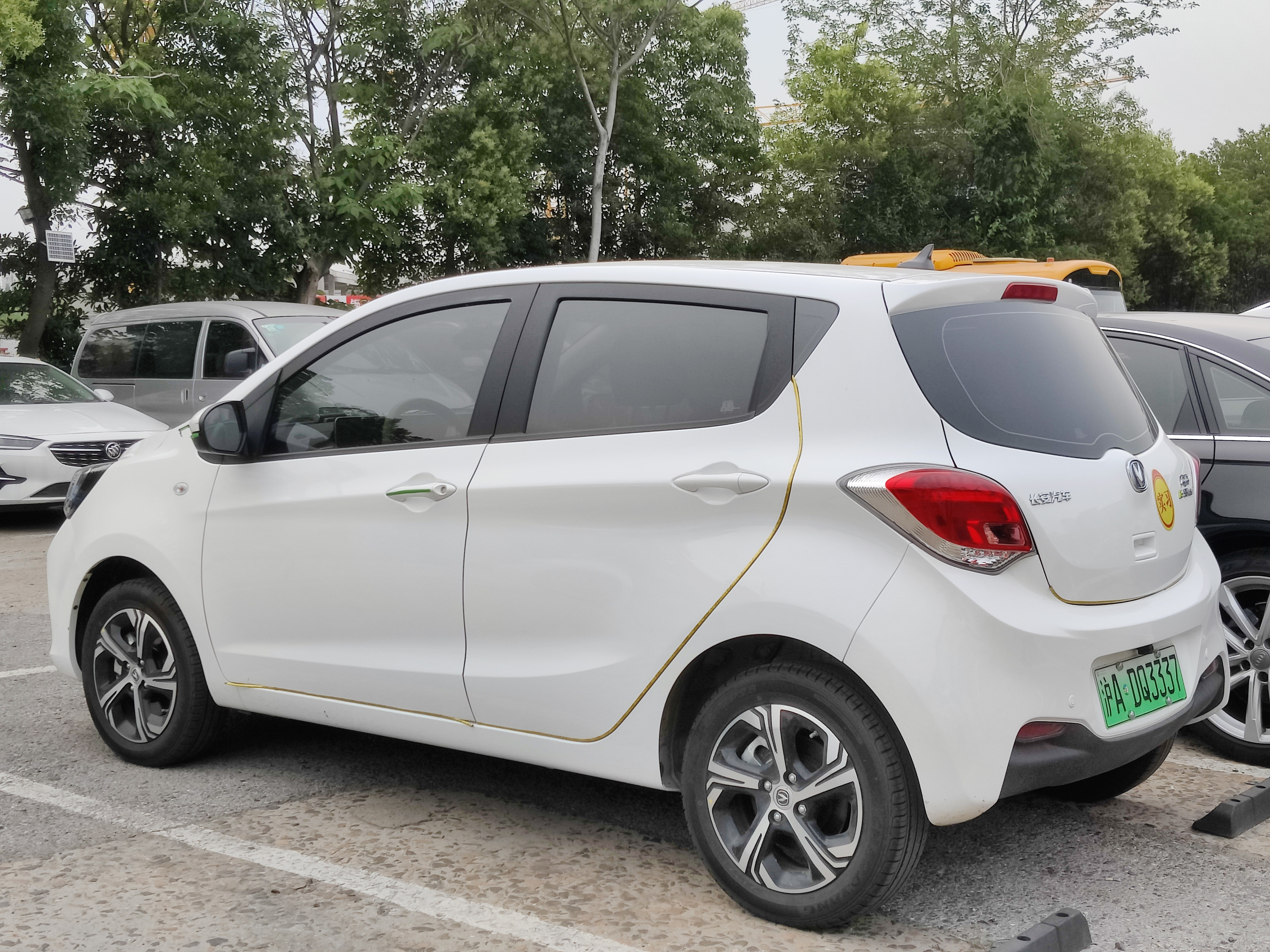
Rear view of the Changan BenBen E-Star.

== Sales ==
Year	China	
Year	Oshan BenBen E-Star	Changan BenBen
2023	13,790	489
2024	1,955	12
2025	7	6
