= Acer beTouch E200 =

Smartphone

The Acer beTouch E200 (also known as Acer L1) is a smartphone manufactured by Acer Inc. of Taiwan. It runs Windows Mobile 6.5 operating system and was released in October 2009.

== Main features ==
The beTouch E200 runs Windows Mobile 6.5. It has a 3-megapixel camera and an A-GPS module. It also comes with Google Maps. It lacks Wi-Fi capability.

- 3G +
- TFT touch screen 3" 240 x 320 pixels
- Touch interface UI 3.0 Acer
- Sliding alphanumeric keypad
- AFN 3 megapixels
- A-GPS module
- 512 MB internal memory + microSD Memory Card
- RAM 256 MB
- Qualcomm 528 MHz processor
- Bluetooth 2.0 EDR
- Windows Mobile 6.5
- 3G talk time up to 5h
- Dimensions 110 x 53.5 x 15.4 mm
- weight 146 g
- 1140 mAh Lithium-ion Battery
