= Zotye E200 =

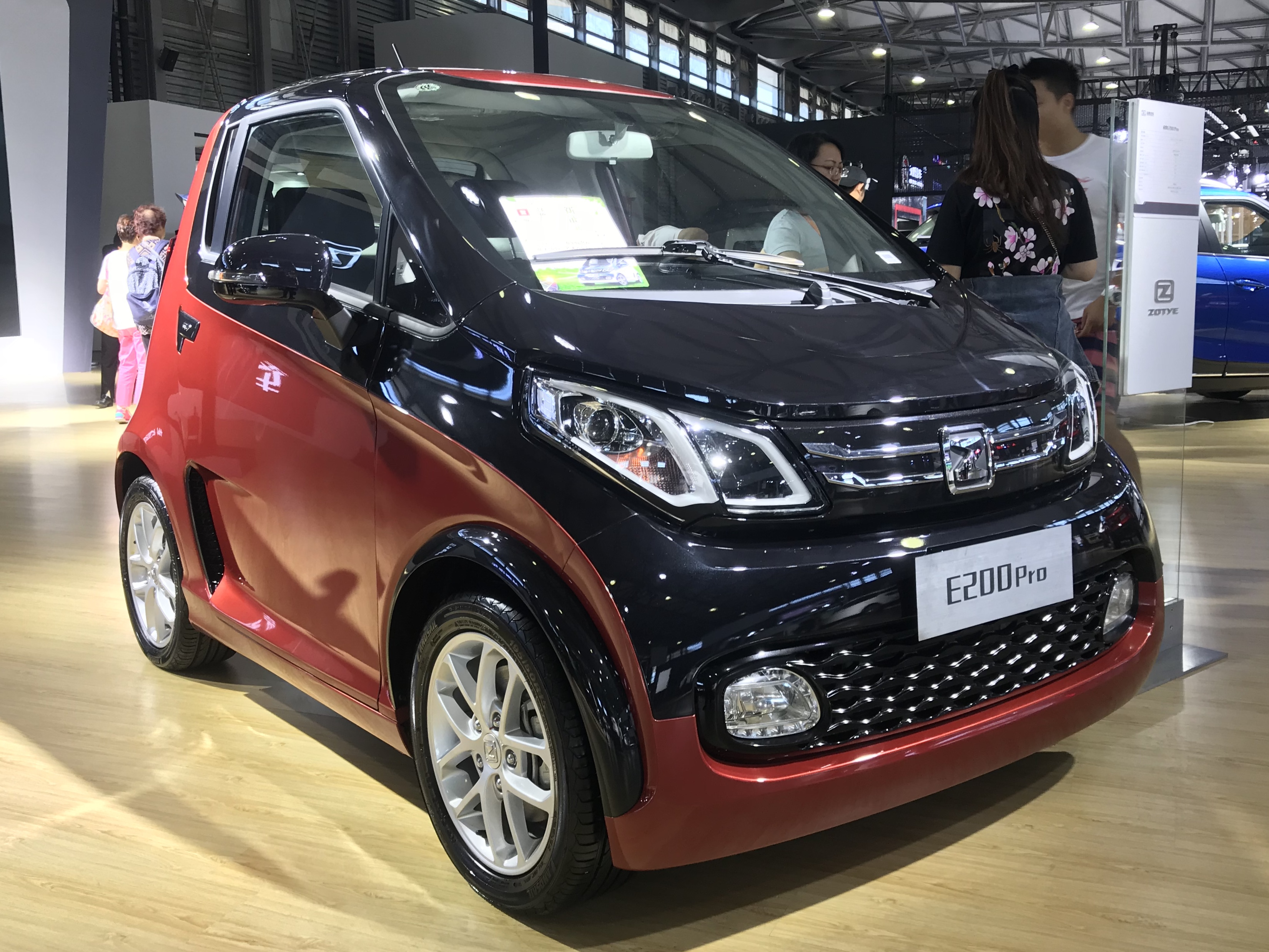

Overview
- Manufacturer: Zotye
- Production: 2016–2021
- Assembly: China: Pukou, Nanjing

Body and chassis
- Class: All-Electric Supermini
- Body style: 3-door hatchback 5-door hatchback
- Layout: Rear-motor, rear-wheel drive

Powertrain
- Electric motor: 60 kW Permanent-Magnet Synchronous
- Transmission: Single-speed Automatic
- Battery: 24.52–31.9 kWh Li-ion (Lithium ion)

Dimensions
- Wheelbase: 1,810 mm (71.3 in)
- Length: 2,735 mm (107.7 in)
- Width: 1,600 mm (63.0 in)
- Height: 1,630 mm (64.2 in)
- Kerb weight: 1,080 kg (2,381 lb)

The Zotye E200 was an all-electric car that is manufactured by the Chinese manufacturer Zotye.

== Overview ==
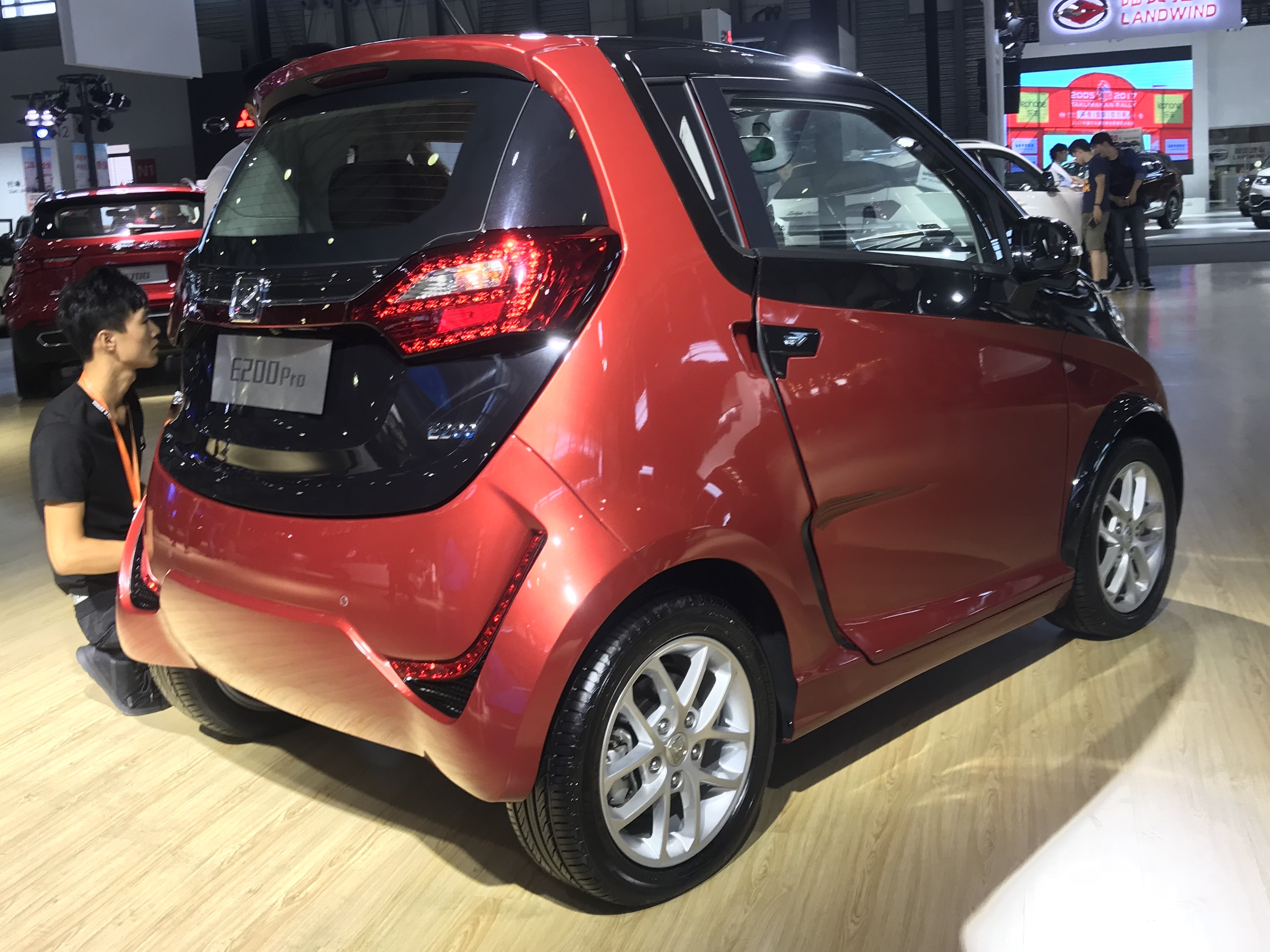
Zotye E200 rear

The Zotye E200 was unveiled during the 2015 Shanghai Auto Show in China with prices stated to be 69,900 yuan.

The E200 electric city car is powered by an electric motor producing 82 hp and 170 nm of torque. According to Zotye, the Zotye E200 has a top speed of 150 kilometer per hour with a maximum range of 220 kilometers. The E200 is available with a choice of two batteries; 24.5kWh or 31.9 kWh.
