= Dayun Yuehu ES3 =

Battery electric city car

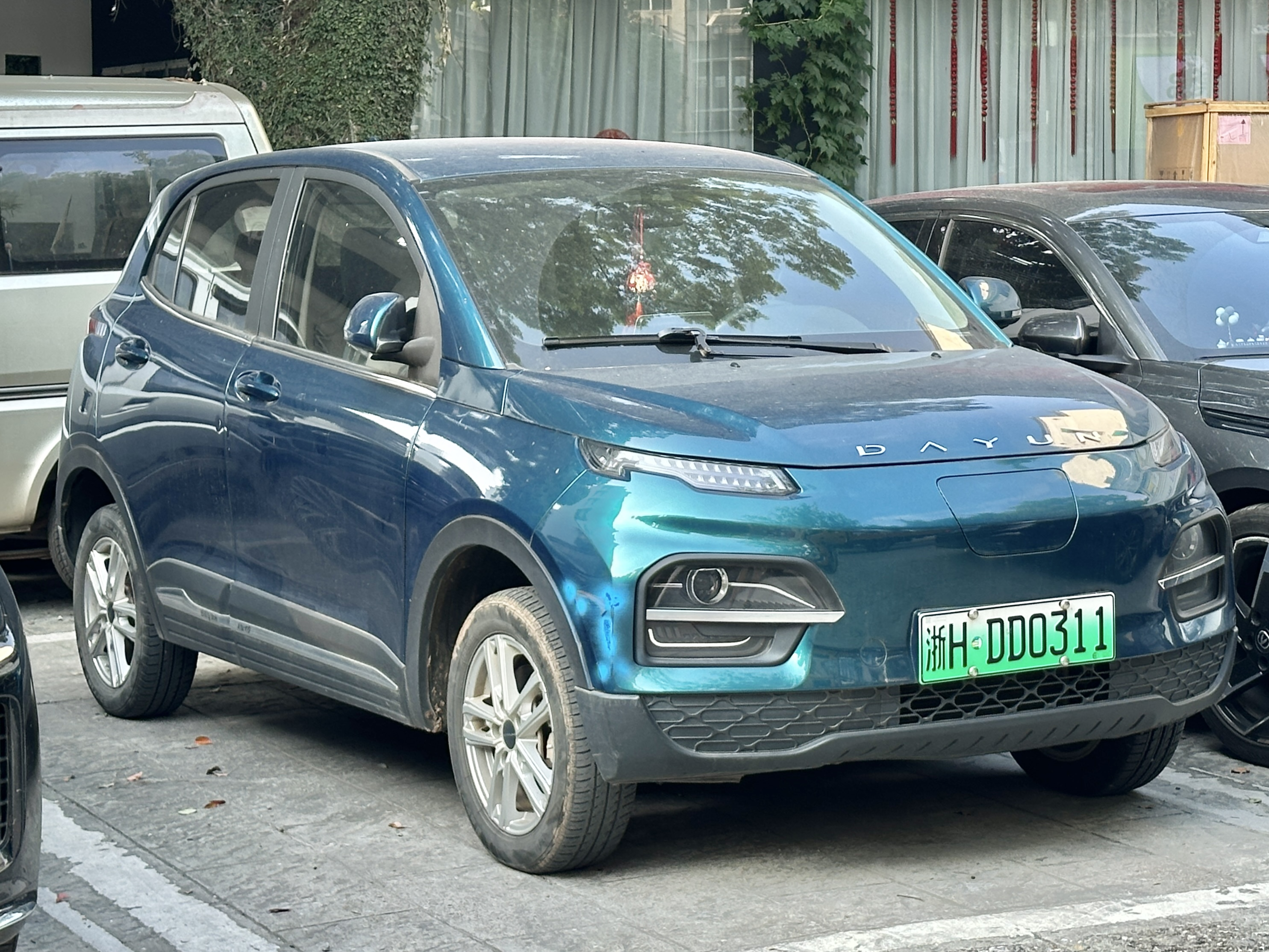

Overview
- Manufacturer: Dayun Group
- Also called: Dayun ES3; Dayun Yuehu
- Production: 2021–present
- Assembly: China

Body and chassis
- Class: City car (A)
- Body style: 5-door hatchback
- Layout: Front-motor, front-wheel-drive
- Platform: Dayun EV platform

Powertrain
- Electric motor: Permanent magnet synchronous motor
- Battery: 30.66–33.5 kWh lithium iron phosphate battery

Dimensions
- Wheelbase: 2,410 mm (94.9 in)
- Length: 3,695 mm (145.5 in)
- Width: 1,685 mm (66.3 in)
- Height: 1,595 mm (62.8 in)

The Dayun Yuehu ES3 (Chinese: 大运悦虎ES3) is a battery electric city car produced by the Chinese manufacturer Dayun Group.

== Overview ==
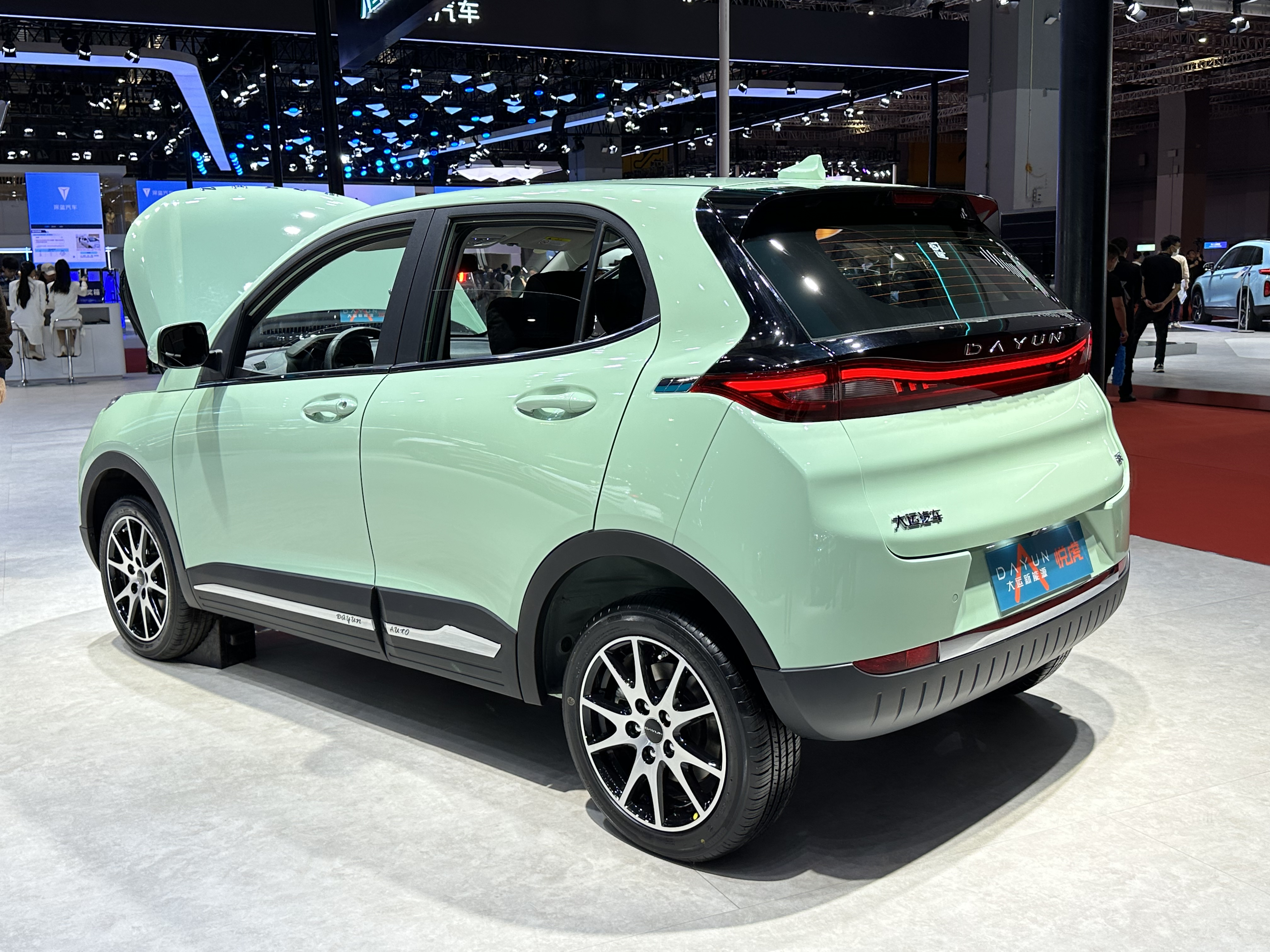
Rear view

The Yuehu ES3 was introduced in 2021.

== Export markets ==
The Yuehu ES3 was entered the German market in 2023 under the simplified name Dayun ES3. The model was imported by Lada Automobile GmbH and marketed as one of the least expensive battery electric vehicles available in Germany.

The German market vehicles were equipped with a 35 kW (48 hp) electric motor and a 33.5 kWh battery pack. The vehicle had a claimed range of up to 300 km and a top speed of 100 km/h.

== Specifications ==
The Yuehu ES3 uses a front-mounted permanent magnet synchronous motor producing 35 kW (48 hp) and 105 Nm of torque.

The Battery capacity varies by market and specification, with figures ranging between 30.66 kWh and 33.5 kWh reported by automotive publications and distributor specifications.

The vehicle measures 3,695 mm long with a wheelbase of 2,410 mm, positioning it in the city car segment.
