= Yuanhang H8 =

Battery electric mid-size crossover SUV

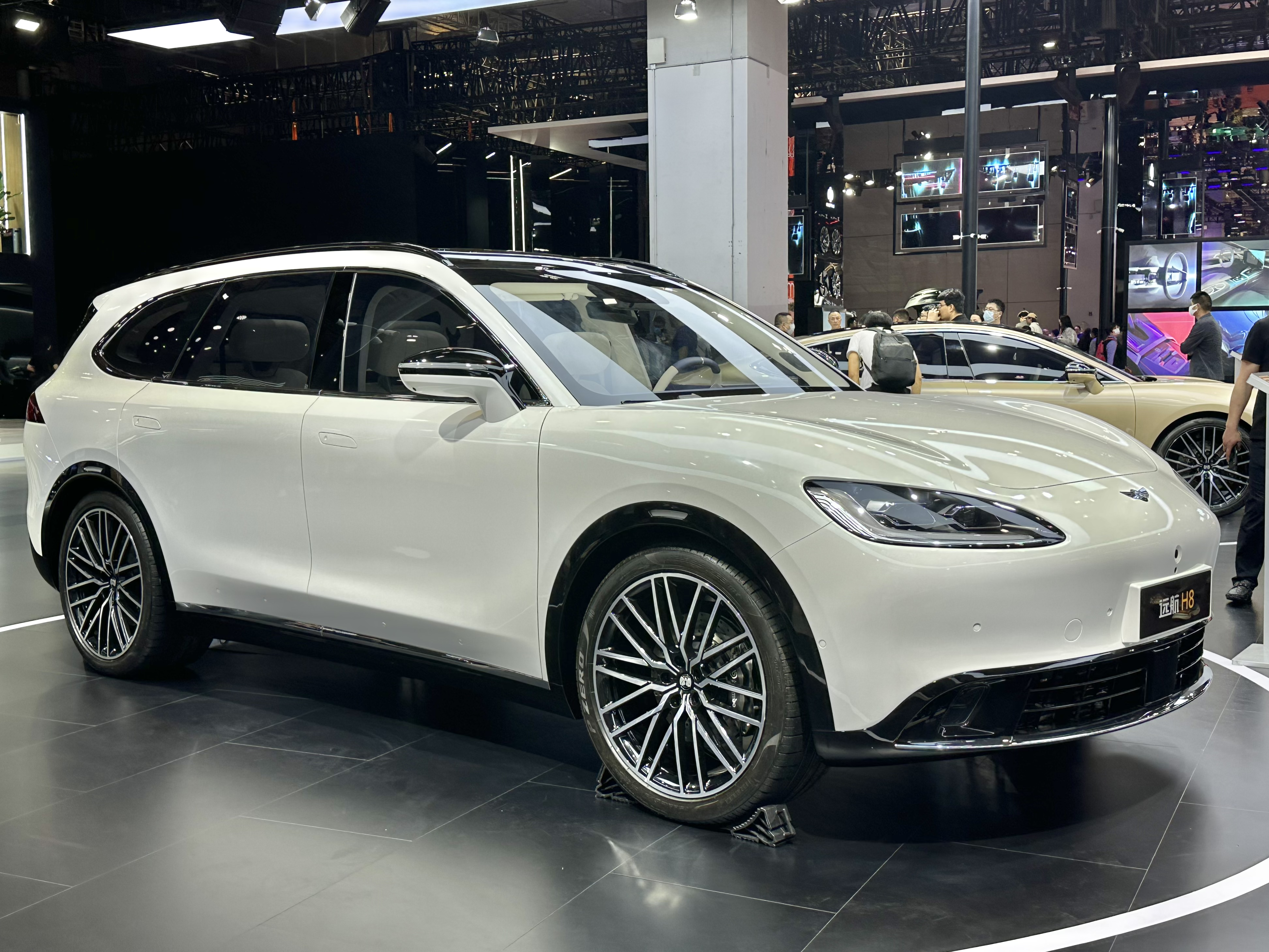

Overview
- Manufacturer: Yuanhang Auto (Dayun Group)
- Production: 2023–2024
- Assembly: China: Yuncheng, Shanxi

Body and chassis
- Class: Mid-size crossover SUV (E)
- Body style: 5-door SUV
- Layout: Rear-motor, rear-wheel-drive; Dual-motor, all-wheel-drive
- Platform: BHD
- Related: Yuanhang H9

Powertrain
- Electric motor: AC permanent magnet synchronous
- Power output: 250–520 kW (340–707 PS; 335–697 hp)
- Battery: Li-ion NMC: 81.05 kWh Eve Energy; 88.42 kWh Farasis; 98 kWh Eve Energy; 150 kWh
- Electric range: 620–1,020 km (385–634 mi) CLTC

Dimensions
- Wheelbase: 3,126 mm (123.1 in)
- Length: 5,230 mm (205.9 in)
- Width: 2,015 mm (79.3 in)
- Height: 1,760 mm (69.3 in)

The Yuanhang H8 is a battery electric mid-size crossover SUV produced by the Chinese manufacturer Yuanhang Auto, a subsidiary of Dayun Group.

== Overview ==
The H8 was initially previewed at the Yuanhang brand launch at the 2022 Chengdu Auto Show, before it was officially revealed at the 2023 Chengdu Auto Show in August, and went on sale in 2023.

The vehicle is based on Yuanhang's BHD (Beyond the Horizon of Drive) electric vehicle platform developed co-developed by Bosch and Huawei.

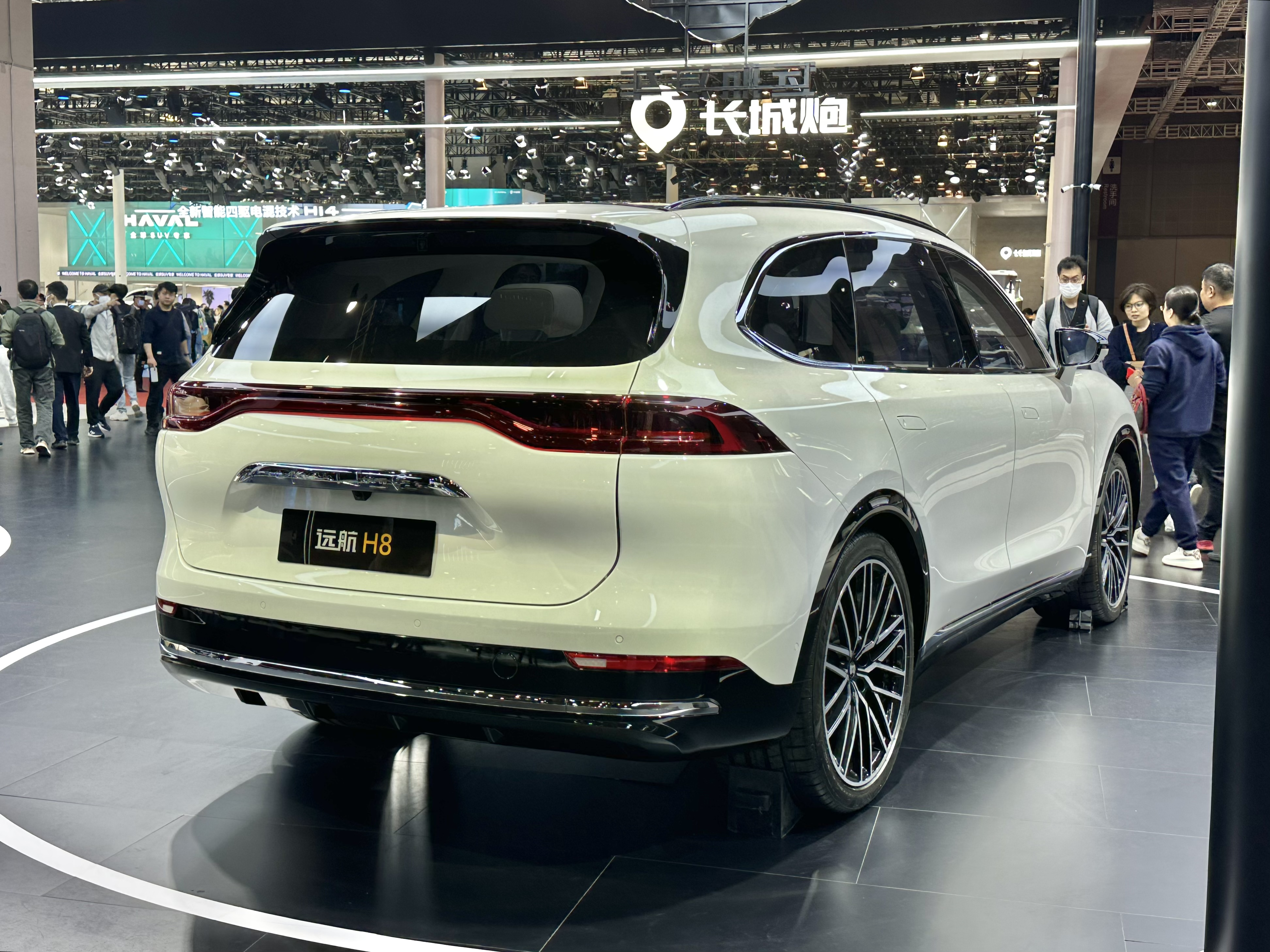
Rear view
