= Yuanhang Y7 =

Battery electric full-size sedan

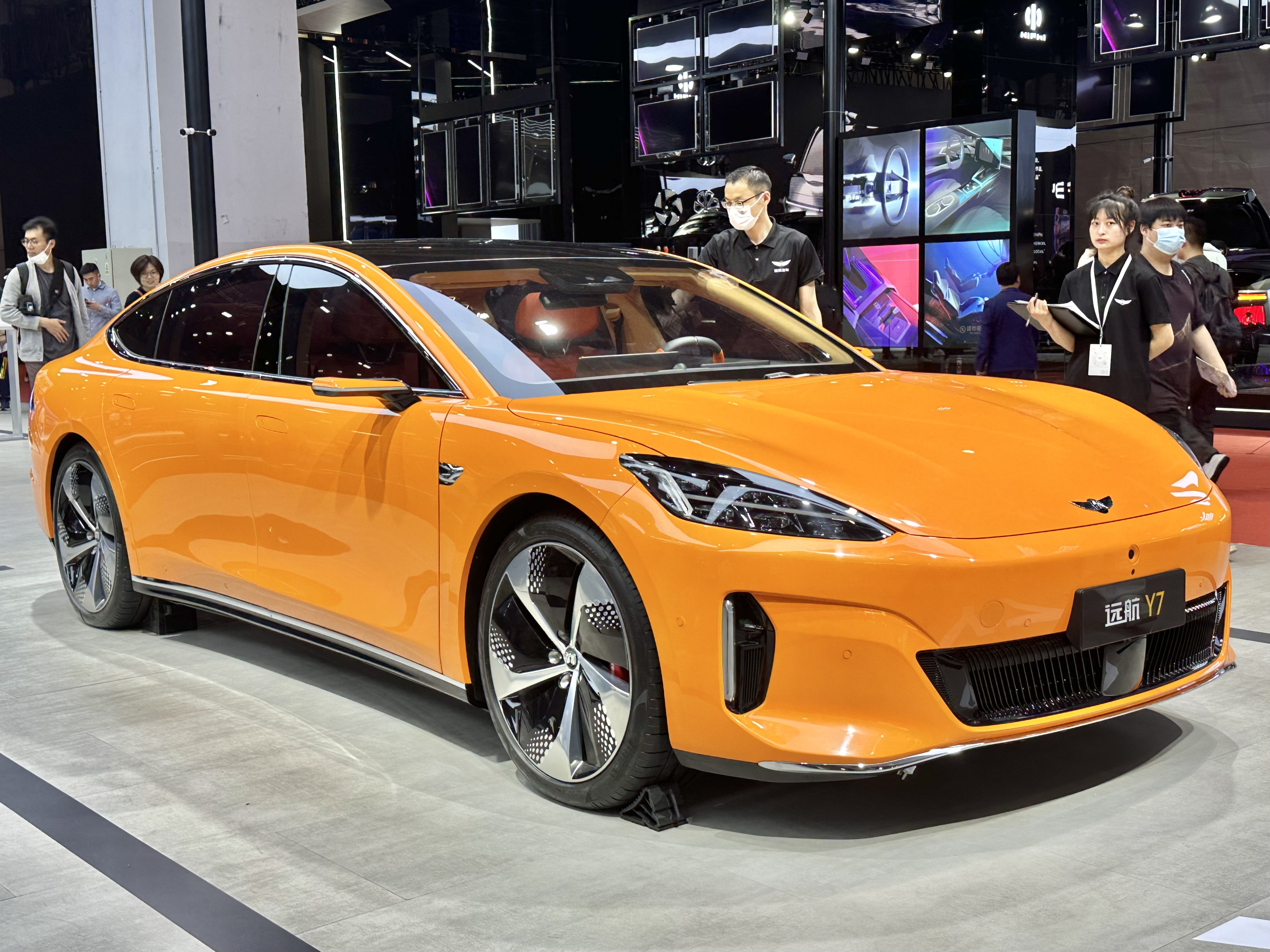

Overview
- Manufacturer: Yuanhang Auto (Dayun Group)
- Production: 2023–2024
- Assembly: China: Yuncheng, Shanxi

Body and chassis
- Class: Full-size car (F)
- Body style: 4-door sedan
- Layout: Rear-motor, rear-wheel-drive; Dual-motor, all-wheel-drive
- Platform: BHD
- Doors: Scissor doors
- Related: Yuanhang Y6

Powertrain
- Electric motor: AC permanent magnet synchronous
- Power output: 250–520 kW (340–707 PS; 335–697 hp)
- Battery: Li-ion NMC: 81.05 kWh Eve Energy; 88.42 kWh Farasis; 98 kWh Eve Energy; 150 kWh
- Electric range: 620–1,020 km (385–634 mi) CLTC

Dimensions
- Wheelbase: 3,128 mm (123.1 in)
- Length: 5,260 mm (207.1 in)
- Width: 2,000 mm (78.7 in)
- Height: 1,490 mm (58.7 in)

The Yuanhang Y7 is a battery electric executive sedan produced by the Chinese manufacturer Yuanhang Auto, a subsidiary of Dayun Group.

== Overview ==
The Y7 was initially previewed at the Yuanhang brand launch at the 2022 Chengdu Auto Show, before it was officially revealed at the 2023 Chengdu Auto Show in August, and went on sale in 2023.

The vehicle is based on Yuanhang's BHD (Beyond the Horizon of Drive) electric vehicle platform co-developed by Bosch and Huawei. The exterior has a grille-less design and a fastback shape, paired with frameless doors and hidden door handles.

The interior features a vertical 17.4-inch center console infotainment display, a 12.3-inch digital instrument cluster, and a 70-inch augmented reality head-up display, all using Alibaba-developed AliOS software running on a Qualcomm Snapdragon 8155 SoC. It has a 3.2 m^{2} (34 sq ft) dual-panel panoramic sunroof, with the rear panel extending to the back of the cabin to serve as the rear window. It has a 19-speaker sound system, with an optional 27-speaker system available. The outboard rear seats have independent power seatback angle adjustment. The center rear seat folds down into an armrest containing a wireless charging pad and a touchscreen display for controlling climate, seating functions, and media.

The Y7 supports fast charging, taking 30 minutes to charge from 20% to 80%. It has an optional V2L system capable of up to 3.3kW.

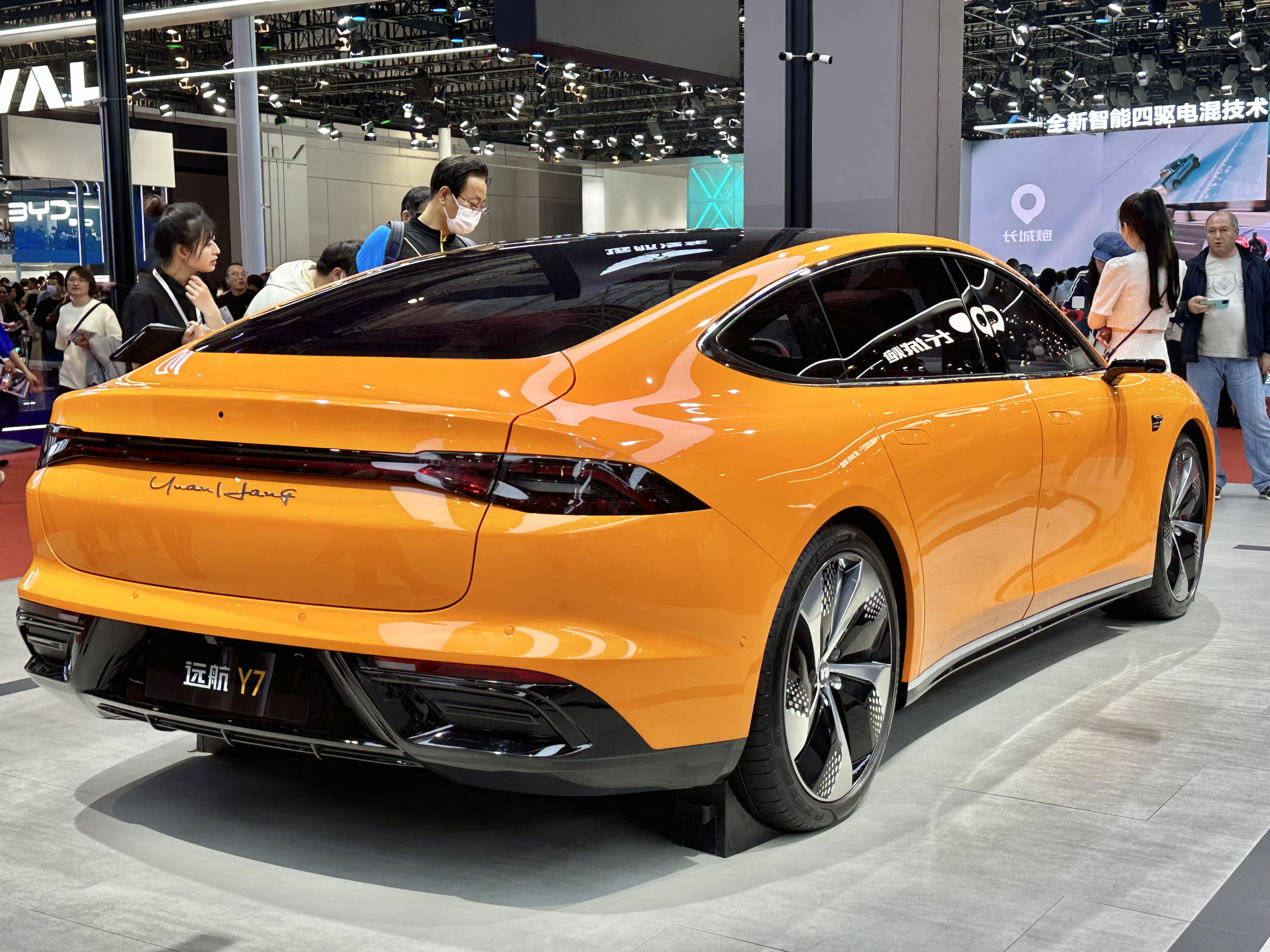
Rear view

== Powertrain ==
The Y7 is available with only battery electric powertrains using an 800V architecture in both rear-wheel drive and all-wheel drive. Rear-wheel drive models are powered by an electric motor outputting 335 hp (250 kW; 340 PS) and 400 N⋅m (295 lb⋅ft) of torque. All-wheel drive models add a front motor outputting an additional 335 hp (250 kW; 340 PS) and 345 N⋅m (254 lb⋅ft) of torque.

Initially, both powertrains were offered with a choice of two NMC battery packs: a Farasis-supplied 88.42 kWh pack providing a CLTC range rating of 720 km (447 mi) or 620 km (385 mi) for rear and all-wheel drive variants respectively, or a 98 kWh pack supplied by Eve Energy with a range rating of 810 km (503 mi) or 720 km (447 mi) for rear and all-wheel drive models respectively. For the 2024 model year, a new rear-wheel drive configuration was offered with an Eve Energy-supplied 81.1 kWh NMC pack, providing 660 kilometres (410 mi) of range.

All versions of the Y7 have a top speed of 205 km/h (127 mph). Rear-wheel drive variants all have a claimed 0–100 km/h (62 mph) acceleration time of 5.9 seconds, while all-wheel drive variants do it in a claimed 3.2 seconds.

At launch, the top version of the Y7 using a boosted 520 kW (697 hp; 707 PS) version of the all-wheel drive powertrain was offered with a 150 kWh battery pack providing 1,020 kilometres (634 mi) of CLTC rated range, but it was no longer listed for the 2024 model year.

Battery	Powertrain			Range (CLTC)	0–100 km/h (62 mph)
Battery	Config.	Power	Torque	Range (CLTC)	0–100 km/h (62 mph)
81.05 kWh Eve Energy	RWD	250 kW (340 hp; 340 PS)	400 N⋅m (300 lb⋅ft)	660 km (410 mi)	5.9 s
88.42 kWh Farasis	RWD	250 kW (340 hp; 340 PS)	400 N⋅m (300 lb⋅ft)	720 km (450 mi)	5.9 s
88.42 kWh Farasis	AWD	500 kW (670 hp; 680 PS)	745 N⋅m (549 lb⋅ft)	620 km (390 mi)	3.2 s
98 kWh Eve Energy	RWD	250 kW (340 hp; 340 PS)	400 N⋅m (300 lb⋅ft)	810 km (500 mi)	5.9 s
98 kWh Eve Energy	AWD	500 kW (670 hp; 680 PS)	745 N⋅m (549 lb⋅ft)	720 km (450 mi)	3.2 s
150 kWh	AWD	520 kW (700 hp; 710 PS)	850 N⋅m (630 lb⋅ft)	1,020 km (630 mi)	3.2 s
