= Dayun Group =

Chinese vehicle manufacturing conglomerate

- Founded: 1987; 39 years ago
- Headquarters: Yuncheng, Shanxi, China
- Products: trucks, motorcycles, engines, real estate
- Divisions: Dayun Light Truck; Dayun Motor; Dayun Motorcycle; Dayang Motorcycle; Weichai Engine; Dayun Real Estate Development; Luoyang Dayun
- Website: http://www.dayuncn.com/

The Dayun Group (simplified Chinese: 大运集团; traditional Chinese: 大運集團) is a Chinese conglomerate based in Yuncheng, Shanxi, China. Through its subsidiaries, it manufactures heavy trucks, light trucks, motorcycles and engines. Its chairman, Mr. Yuan Qinshan, was once elected as a member of the Shanxi Provincial Committee of the Chinese People's Political Consultative Conference.

In March 2009, the group acquired Sichuan Galaxy Automobile Group and was awarded the second prize of National Science and Technology Progress Award and the first prize of Provincial Science and Technology Progress Award.

On October 14, 2011, Wen Jiabao, member of the Standing Committee of the Political Bureau of the CPC Central Committee and Premier of the State Council, visited the Guangzhou Motorcycle Production Base of Dayun Group.

== Divisions ==
=== Trucks ===
==== Dayun Motor ====
Shanxi Dayun Automobile Manufacturing Co., Ltd, known as Dayun Motor, is a heavy truck manufacturer located in Yuncheng, Shanxi, China. It was founded in 2004 as part of the Dayun Group. They are able to build up to 50,000 trucks a year. Trucks are built under the Dayun brand.

==== Models ====
- Dayun CGC
  - 1047/48 4x2 light truck
  - 1060 4x2 6-ton
    - Weichai WP3NQ150E50 (106 kW (142 hp; 144 PS))
  - 1100/20 4x2 10-ton
    - Weichai WP4.1Q160E50 (110.5 kW (148.2 hp; 150.2 PS))
  - 1121 4×4 12.1-ton
    - Weichai WP4.1Q160E50 (110.5 kW (148.2 hp; 150.2 PS))
  - 1140/41 4x2 14-ton
    - Weichai WP4.1NQ190E50 (136 kW (182 hp; 185 PS))
  - 1160 6x4
  - 1210 4x2 21-ton
    - Weichai WP7.300E51 (215 kW (288 hp; 292 PS))
  - 1254 6x4
  - 1311 8x4
  - 1331 6x4
  - 4180/81 semi tractor
  - 4220/22 semi tractor
  - 4250/51/52/53 (CNG/LNG) semi tractor
- Dayun DYX
  - 1250 6x4
  - 1312 8x4
  - 3251/53 6x4 Dump truck
  - 3311/13 (LNG) 8x4 Dump truck
  - 5250/53 6x4
  - 5310/12 semi tractor/8x4

=== Dayun Light Truck ===
Chengdu Dayun Automotive Group Co. Ltd., commonly known as Dayun Light Truck, is a light truck manufacturer based in Chengdu, Sichuan, China, and a division of Dayun Group. It was founded by the Dayun Group in 2009. Light trucks are manufactured under the Dayun brand.

==== Models ====
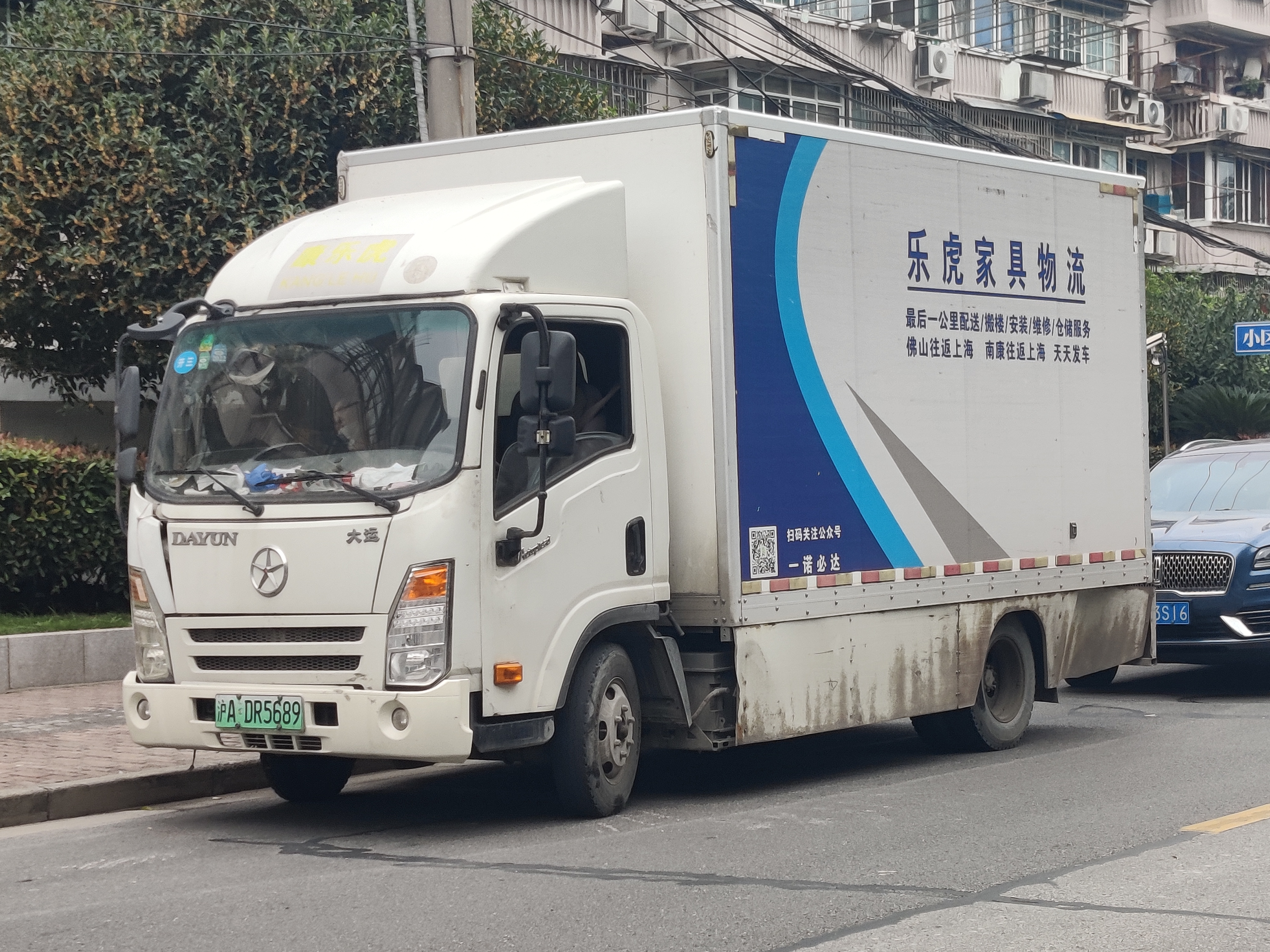
Dayun Aopuli

- Dayun E2
- Dayun Chuanlu
  - 490
  - 4100/02/08
- Dayun QiYun
  - 485/490
  - 4100/02/05/08/10

=== Passenger vehicles ===
==== Yuanhang Auto ====
On the 2022 Chengdu Auto Show a new EV brand called Yuanhang Auto (Chinese: 远航汽车; pinyin: yuǎnháng qìchē; lit. 'Voyage') was launched by Dayun Group as a premium EV brand based in Yuncheng, Shanxi. At the show, Yuanhang unveiled four cars that were to go into production in 2023.

The first vehicles to launch were the Y6 mid-size sedan and H8 mid-size three-row SUV in November and December 2023, which are based on the BHD platform Yuanhang codeveloped with Bosch and Huawei, and use Alibaba's AliOS infotainment system software. It was followed by the Y7 full-size sedan which launched at the 2024 Beijing Auto Show in April, and the H9 full-size SUV in May 2024.

In October 2024, Yuanhang announced that it was undergoing strategic adjustment and reorganization after reports of the company undergoing financial difficulties including cashflow problems due to high competition in the auto market. The reports cited employees who said that there was an ongoing mass exodus of staff after some received delayed salary payments for several months, forced unpaid leave, or layoffs, and that the R&D department's staff count had dropped to low double digits. At the beginning of 2024, Yuanhang had a total of five retail locations located in Beijing, which fell to three stores by November that year, and a store in Haikou was closed after poor sales. Later in November, Dayun Auto confirmed Yuanhang had liquidity problems and was in talks with investors. It said that its factories and R&D facilities were to shortly restart operation, and that Dayun Group's other divisions were unaffected by the financial problems.

- Yuanhang Y6
- Yuanhang Y7
- Yuanhang H8
- Yuanhang H9
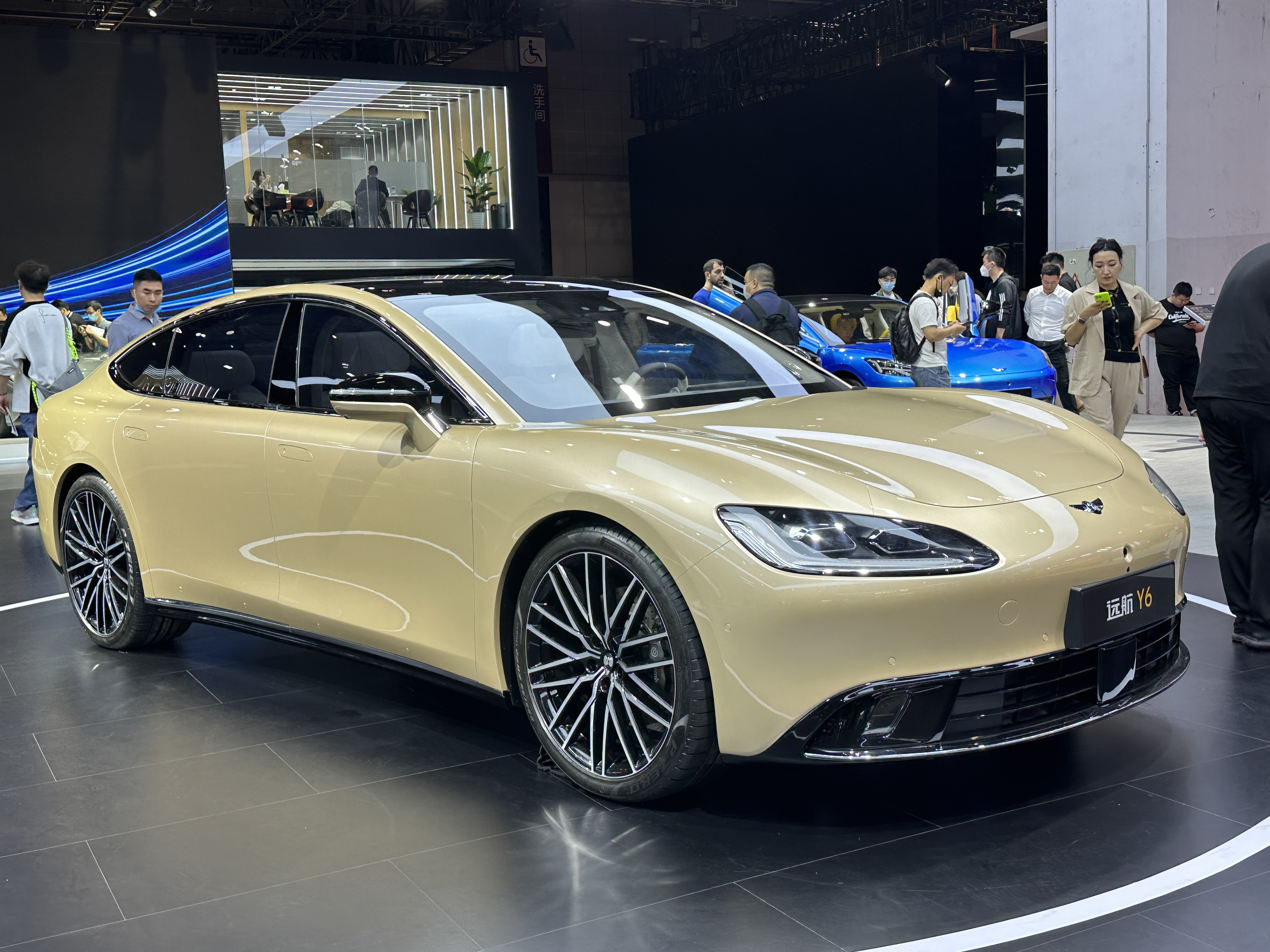
Yuanhang Y6

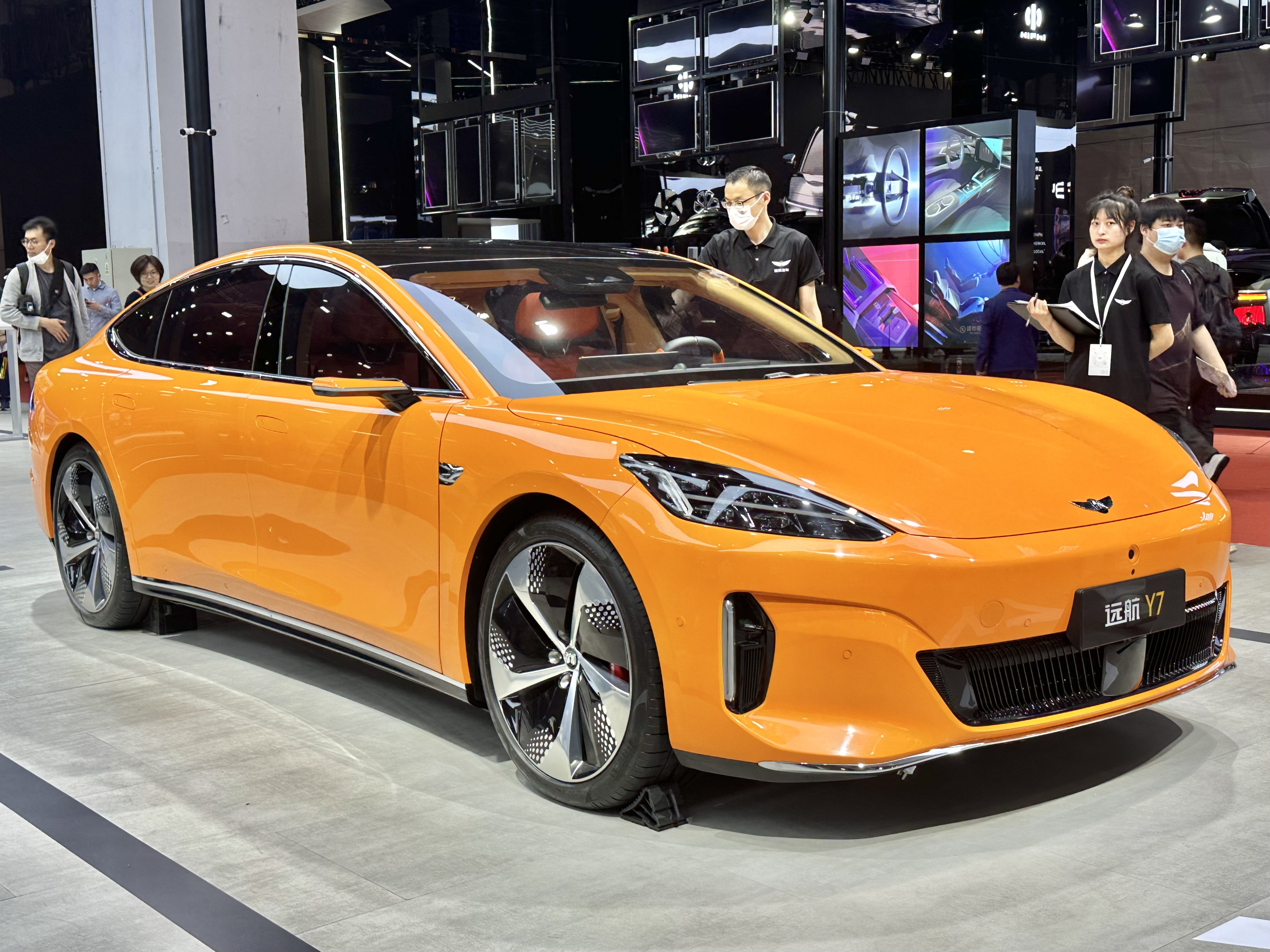
Yuanhang Y7

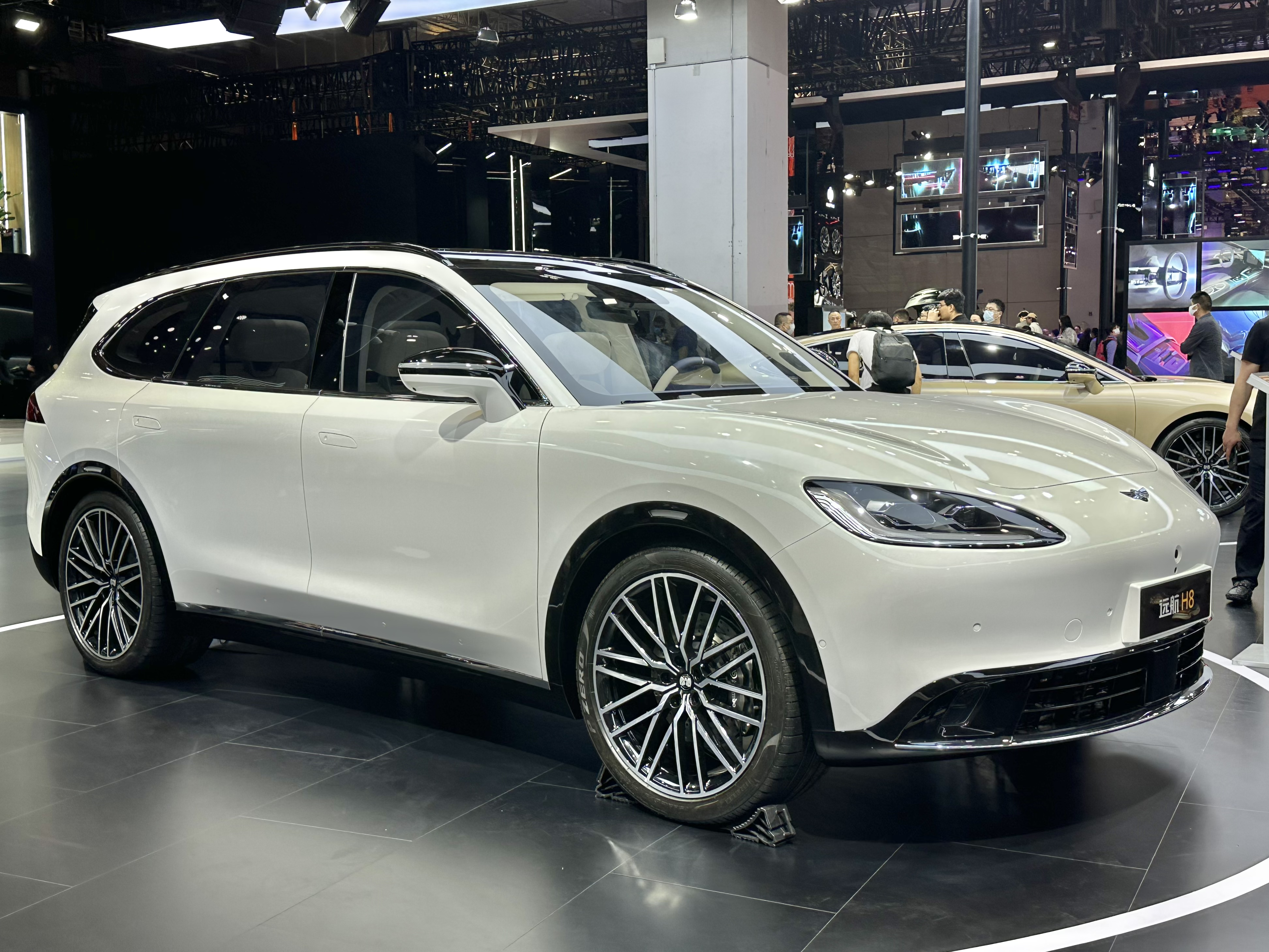
Yuanhang H8

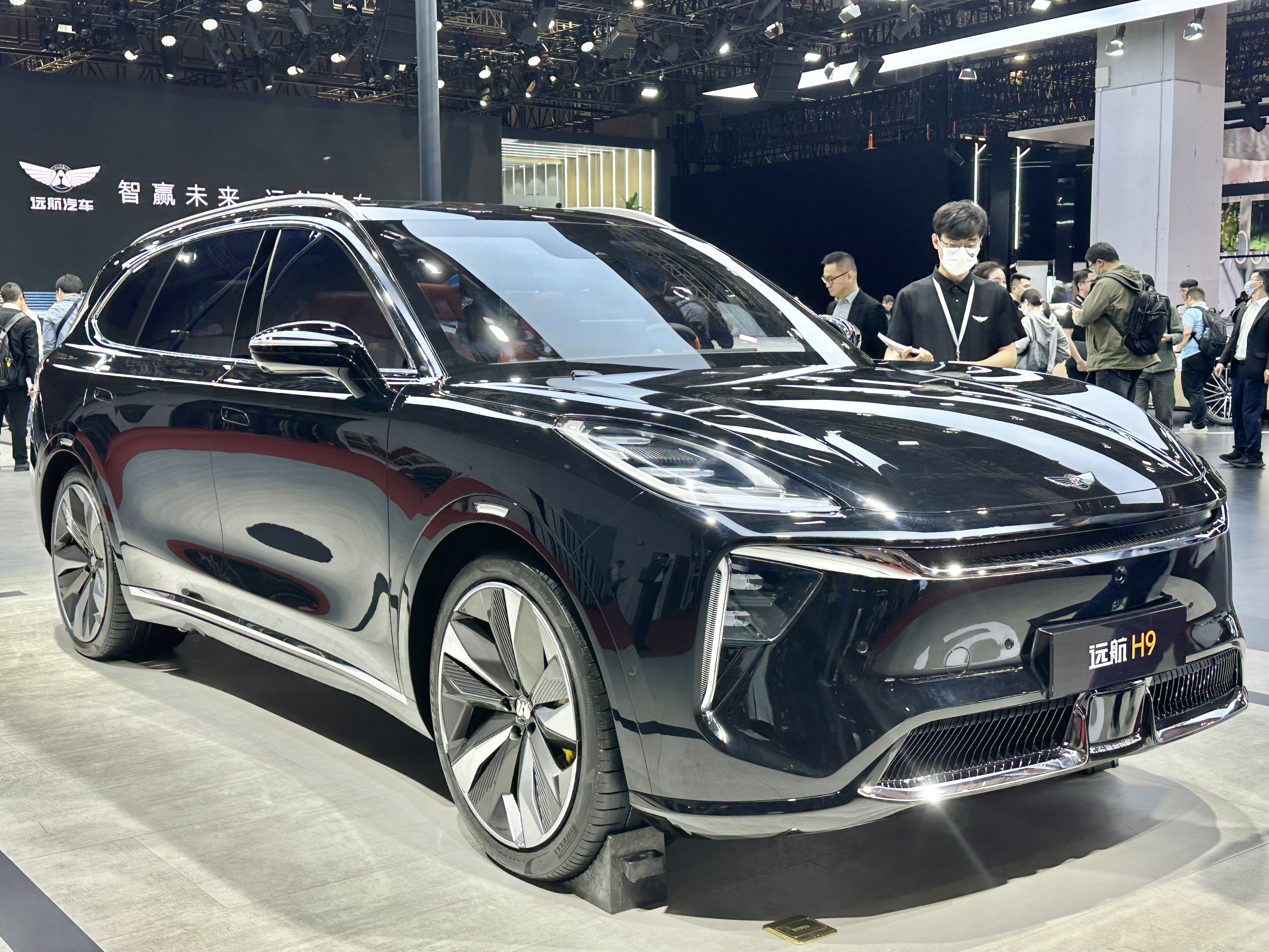
Yuanhang H9

==== Dayun NEV ====
- Dayun Yuehu ES3 — Electric mini crossover SUV
- Dayun Yuanzhi M1 — Electric compact MPV
- Dayun Yuanzhi M2 — Electric compact MPV (prototype)
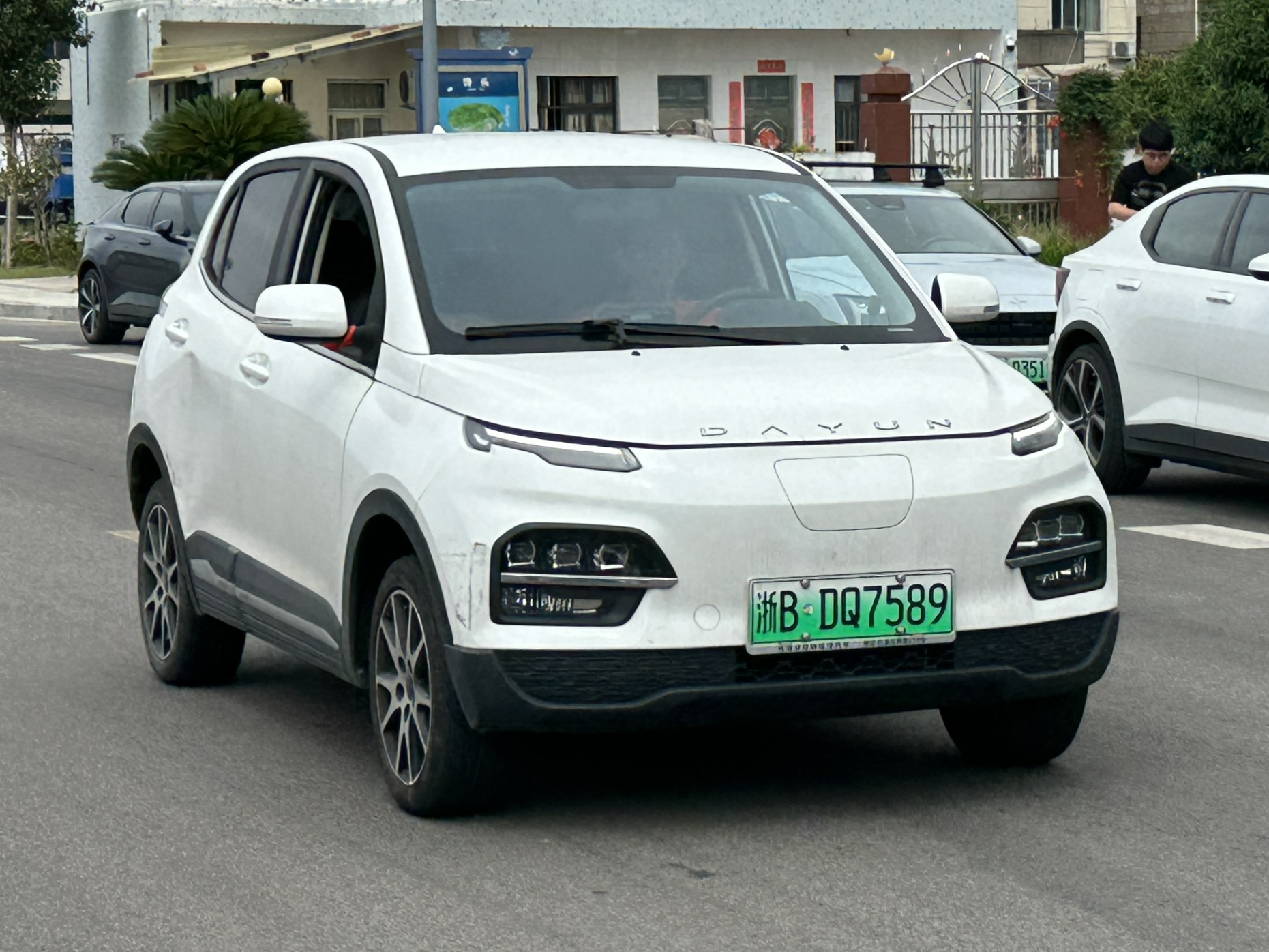
Dayun Yuehu ES3

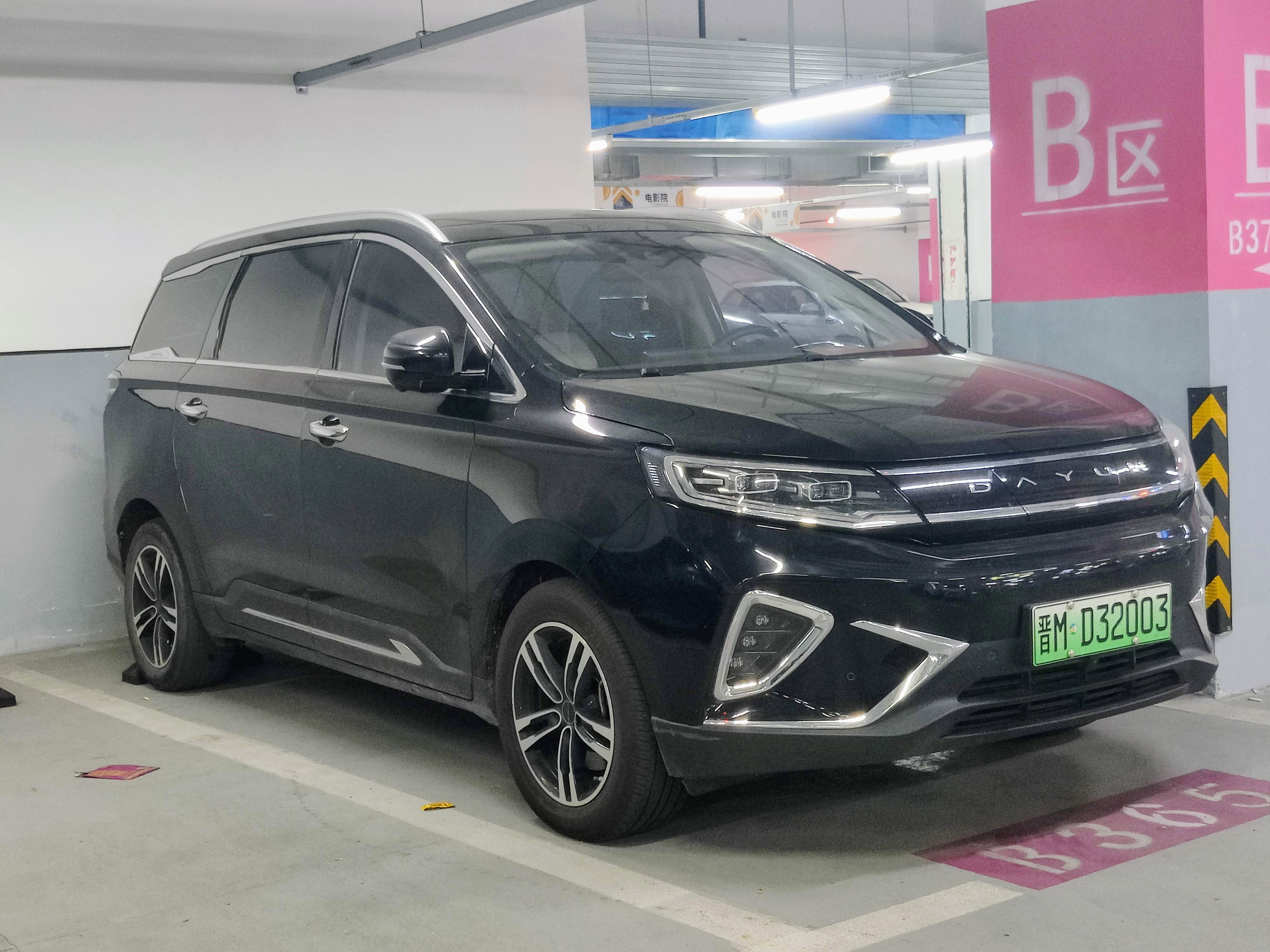
Dayun Yuanzhi M1

==== Dayun Auto ====
- Dayun Pika (Dayun Pickup) — Mid-size pickup

=== Motorcycles ===
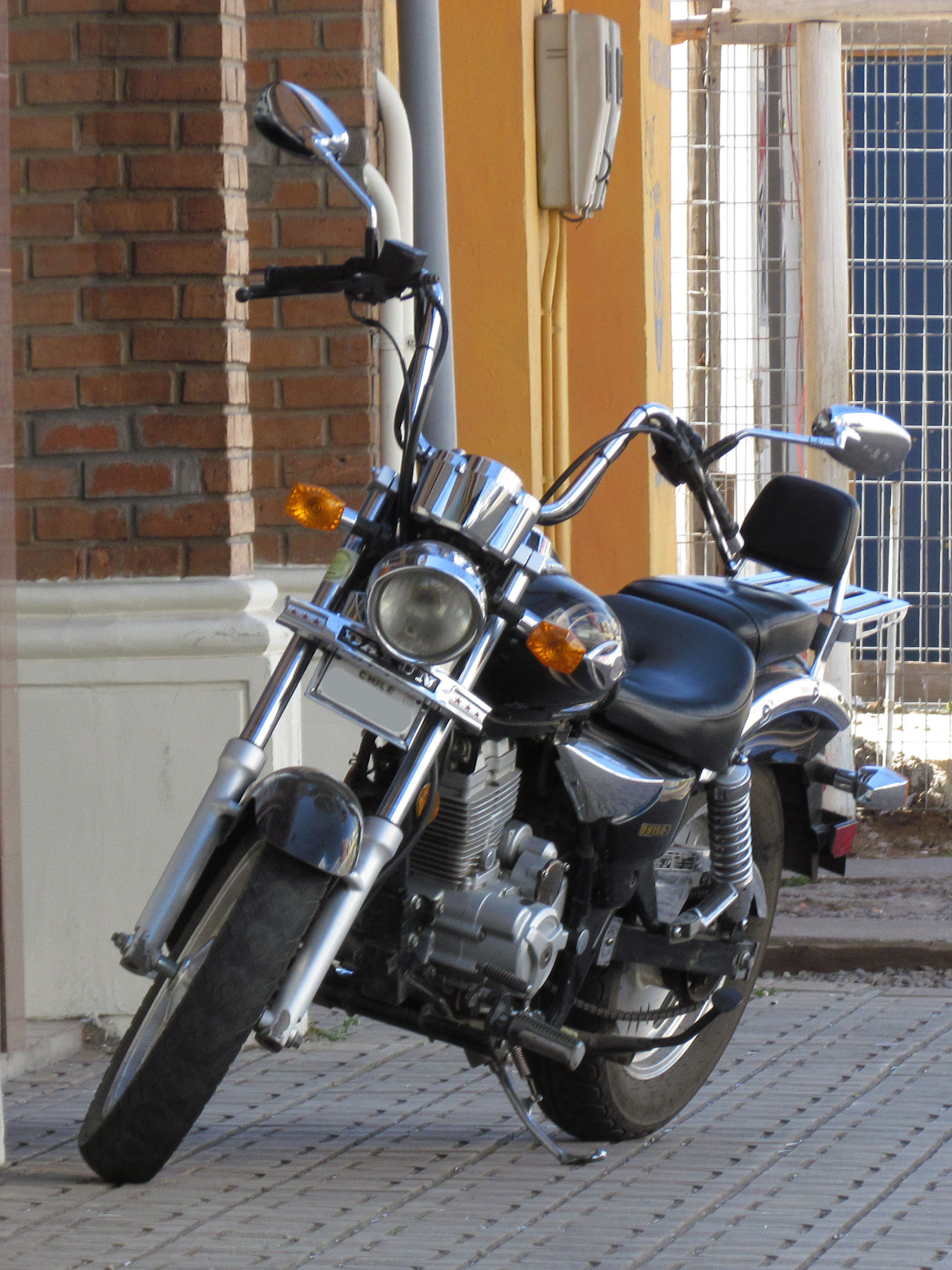
Dayun DY150.

- Dayun Motorcycle manufactures Dayun motorcycles and scooters.
- Luoyang Duyan - manufactures Dayun three-wheeled scooters
