= Dayun Yuanzhi M1 =

Battery electric minivan

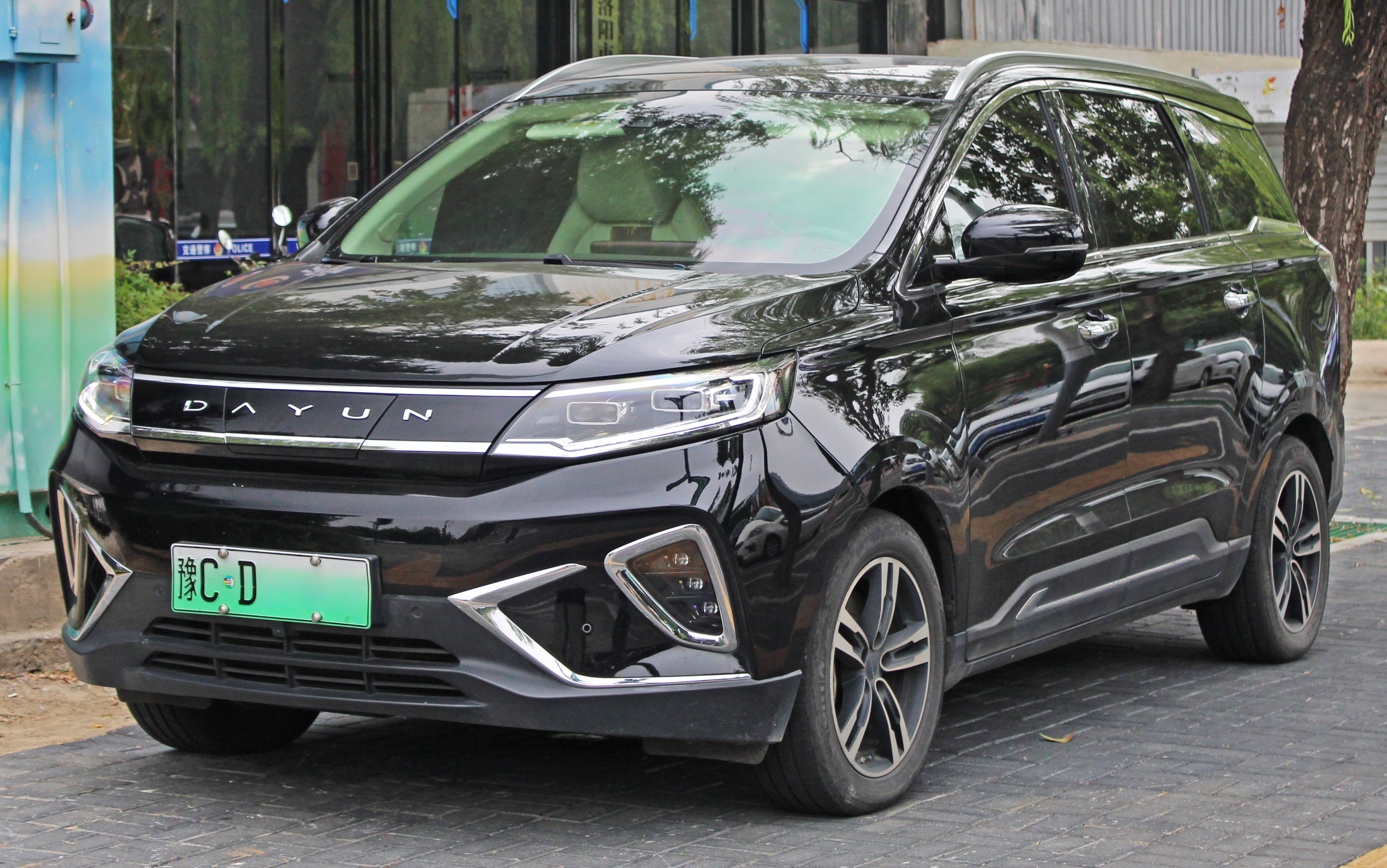

Overview
- Manufacturer: Dayun Group
- Production: 2021–present
- Assembly: China

Body and chassis
- Class: Minivan (M)
- Body style: 5-door minivan
- Layout: Front-motor, front-wheel-drive
- Platform: Dayun EV platform

Powertrain
- Electric motor: Permanent magnet synchronous motor
- Transmission: Single-speed reduction gear
- Battery: 72.27–90.6 kWh lithium-ion battery
- Electric range: Up to 550 km (CLTC)

Dimensions
- Wheelbase: 2,902 mm (114.3 in)
- Length: 4,885 mm (192.3 in)
- Width: 1,870 mm (73.6 in)
- Height: 1,785 mm (70.3 in)

The Dayun Yuanzhi M1 (Chinese: 远志M1) is a battery electric minivan produced by the Chinese manufacturer Dayun Group.

== Overview ==
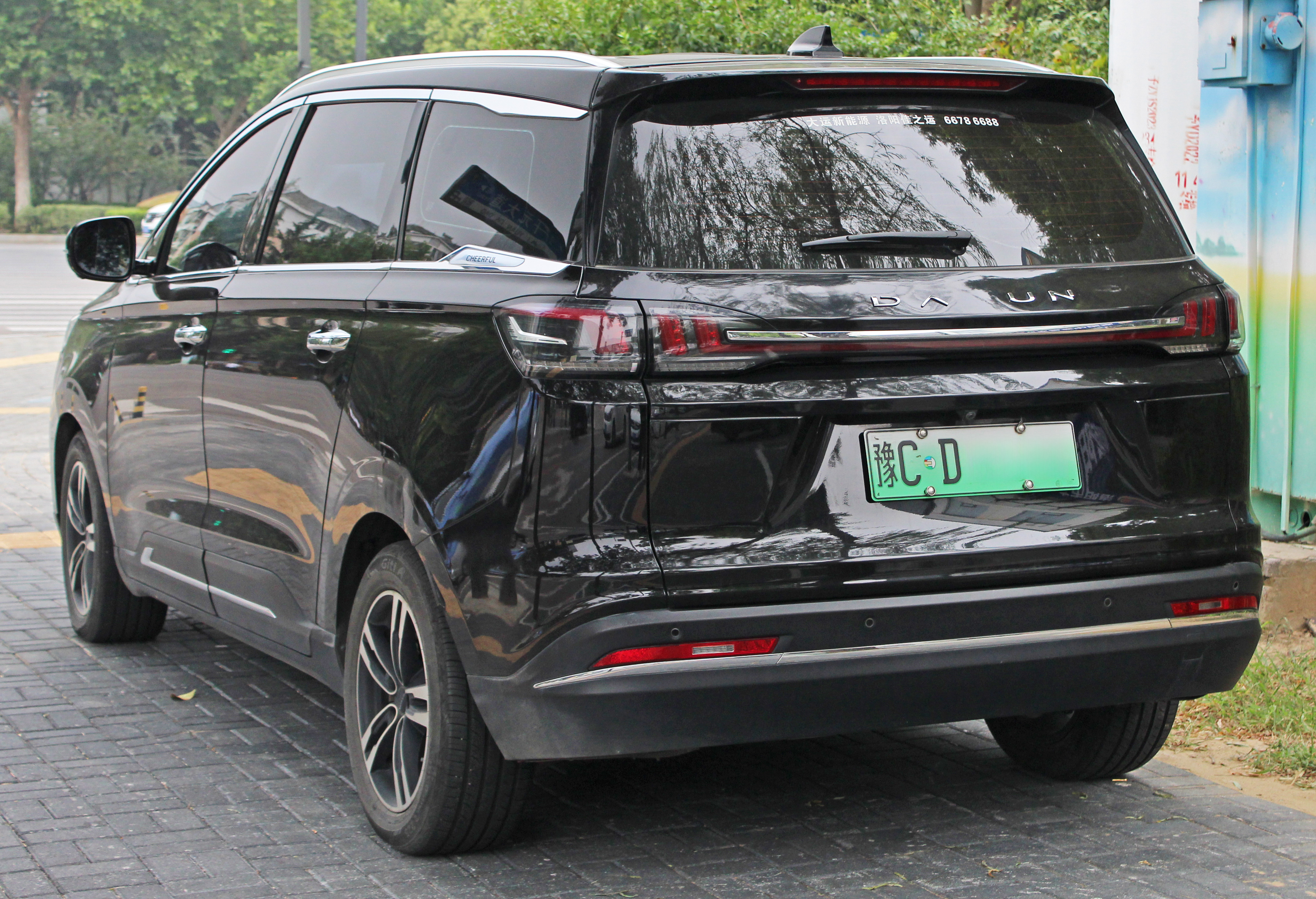
Rear view

The Yuanzhi M1 was introduced in 2021.

== Specifications ==
The Yuanzhi M1 was powered by a permanent magnet synchronous electric motor producing 145 kW (197 hp). Depending on variant, battery capacities range from 72.27 kWh to 90.6 kWh.

The largest battery version is rated for up to 550 km of range under the Chinese CLTC testing cycle. Fast charging capability allows the battery to be charged to 80 percent in approximately 36 minutes using DC fast charging.

== Dayun Yuanzhi M2 ==
Based on the Yuanzhi M1, The Yuanzhi M2 was planned to be premium variant of the Yuanzhi M1. The vehicle was introduced as a part of Dayun's Yuanzhi premium electric series. The Yuanzhi M2 was developed for business transportation and executive shuttle applications, continuing Dayun's focus on electric MPVs. The vehicle remains prototype stage was never produced.
