= K50 =

K-50 or K50 may refer to:

== Vehicles ==
Automobiles

- K-50 truck, an American military truck
- Karry K50, a Chinese compact MPV
- Qiantu K50, a Chinese battery-electric sports car

Ships

- HMS Erica (K50), a corvette of the Royal Navy
- Soviet submarine K-50

== Other uses ==
- K50 Airstrip, in Lower Shabelle, Somalia
- K-50M, a Vietnamese submachine gun
- Bastien und Bastienne, by Wolfgang Amadeus Mozart
- Otanoshike Station, in Hokkaido, Japan
- Pentax K-50, a digital camera
- Potassium-50, an isotope of potassium
- Redmi K50, a smartphone
- Toyota K50 transmission
