= Zedriv =

Chinese automobile manufacturer

- Type: Private
- Traded as: Guoji Zhijun Automotive CO., LTD
- Industry: Automotive
- Founded: April 6, 2017; 9 years ago
- Founder: Zhang Xin
- Headquarters: Ganzhou, Jiangxi Province, China
- Website: www.zedriv.com

Zedriv (Chinese: 国机智骏), officially Guoji Zhijun Automotive Co., LTD, was a Chinese automobile manufacturer that specializes in developing electric vehicles. The company was founded by Beijing based company Sinomach. The company filed for bankruptcy in 2023.

== History ==
Zedriv was founded on April 6, 2017, and is located in Ganzhou, Jiangxi Province, China. Their production plant is located in the New Energy Vehicle City Economic and Technological Development Zone. The plant is 1371 acres, with a total investment of 8 billion yuan, and a 100,000 unit capacity. Their slogan is "For a smart and joyful ride".

All four of their vehicles were shown at the 2019 Auto Shanghai, and all but the GT3 made production in 2020.

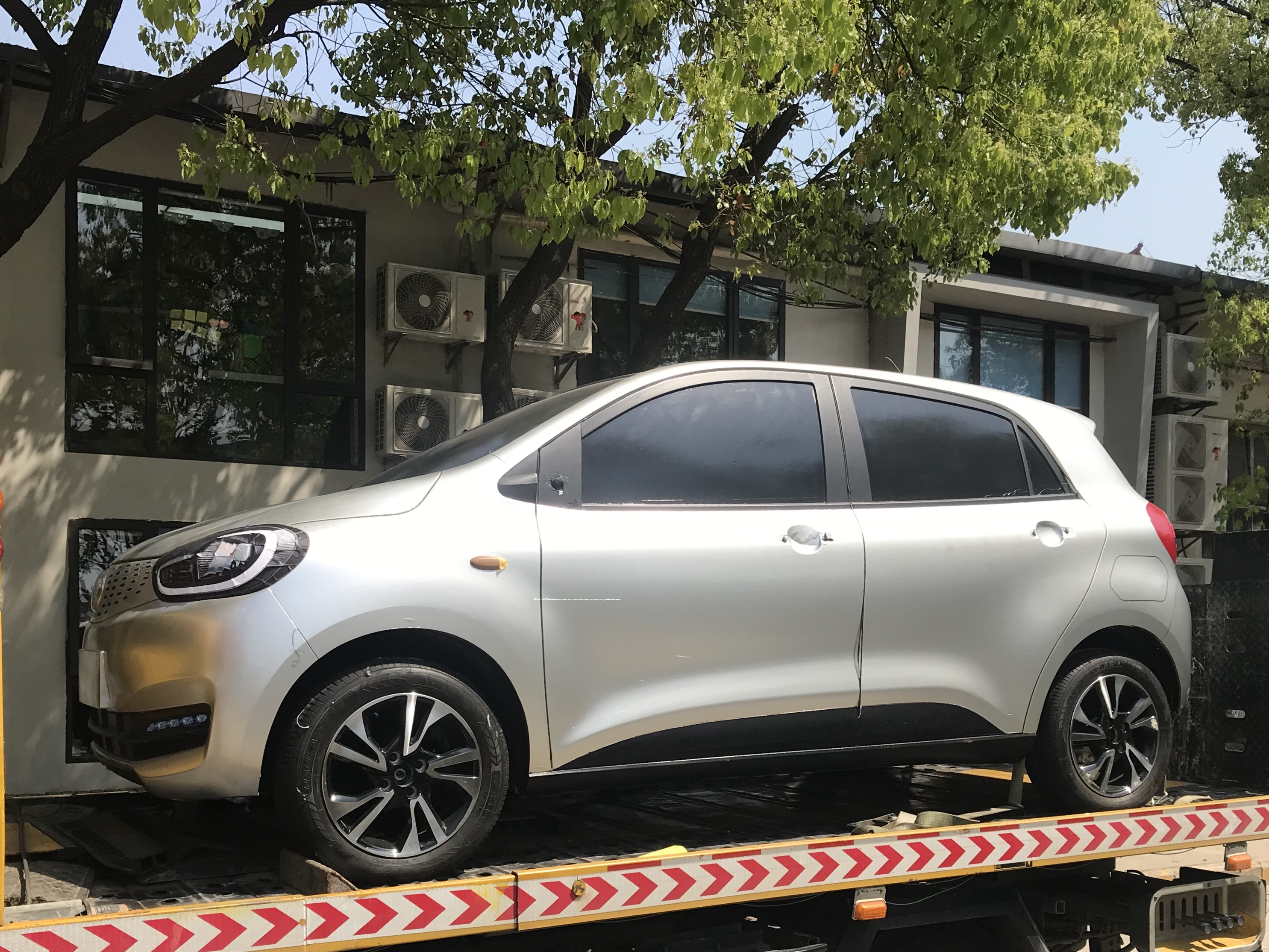
full-size clay design model of the GC1 in Shanghai

The design of Zedriv vehicles were done by Guoji Zhijun Auto Europe R&D Center GMBH under the lead of their design chief, Lorenz Bittner, in Germany and Shanghai.

Zedriv company is under the bankruptcy in 2022 for its low sales.

== Vehicles ==
- Zedriv GC1
- Zedriv GC2
- Zedriv GT3
- Zedriv GX5
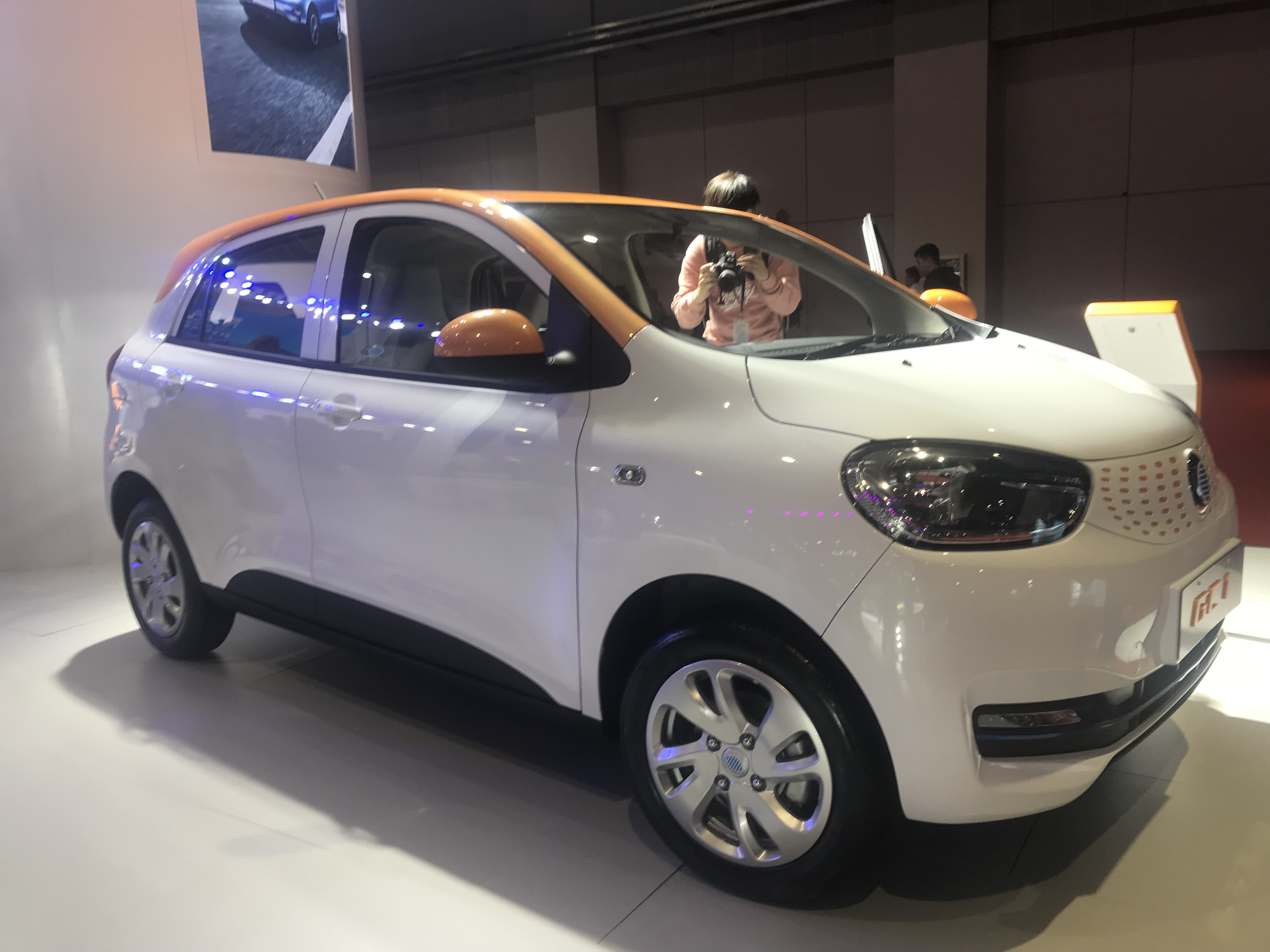
GC1

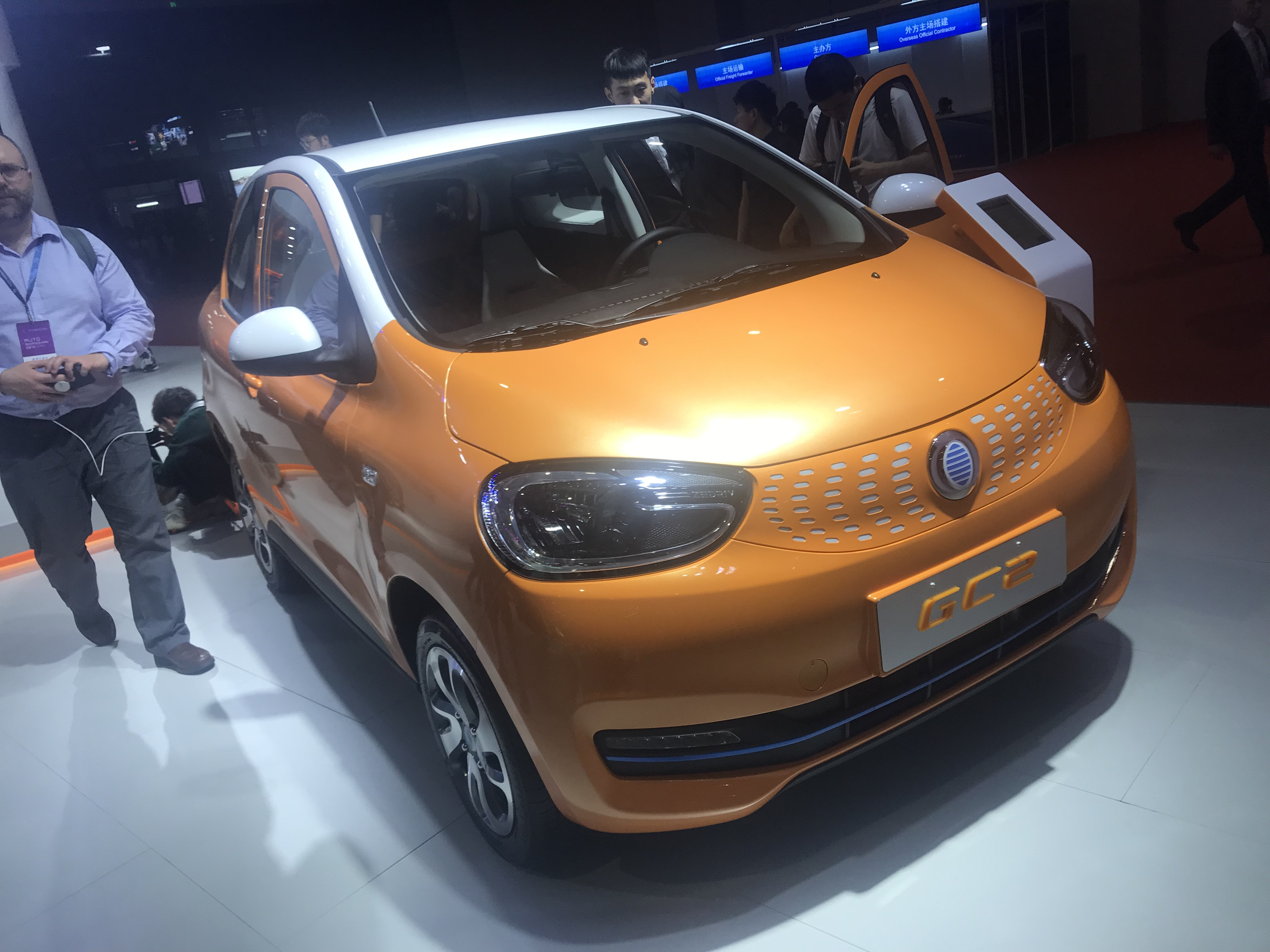
GC2

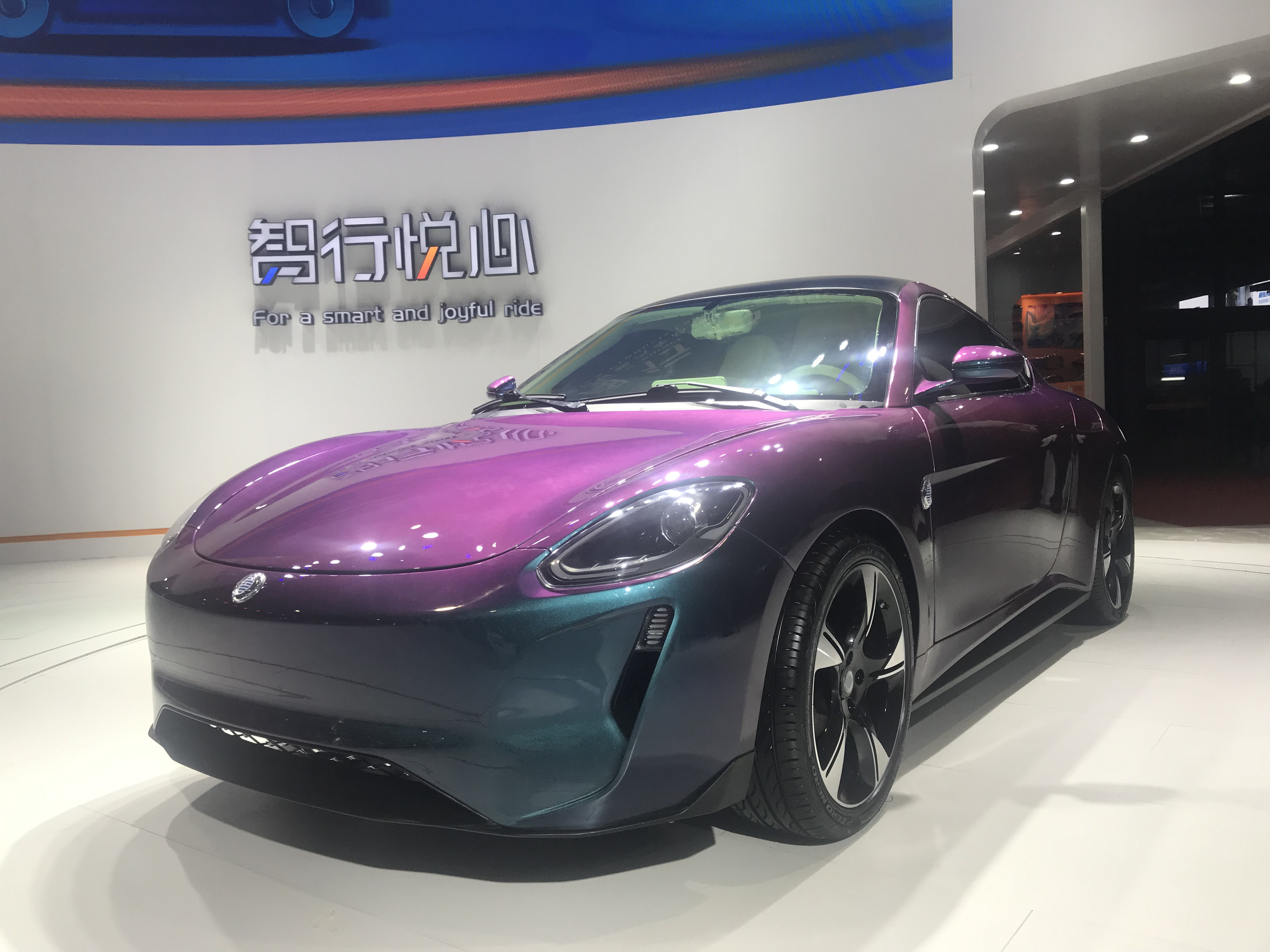
GT3

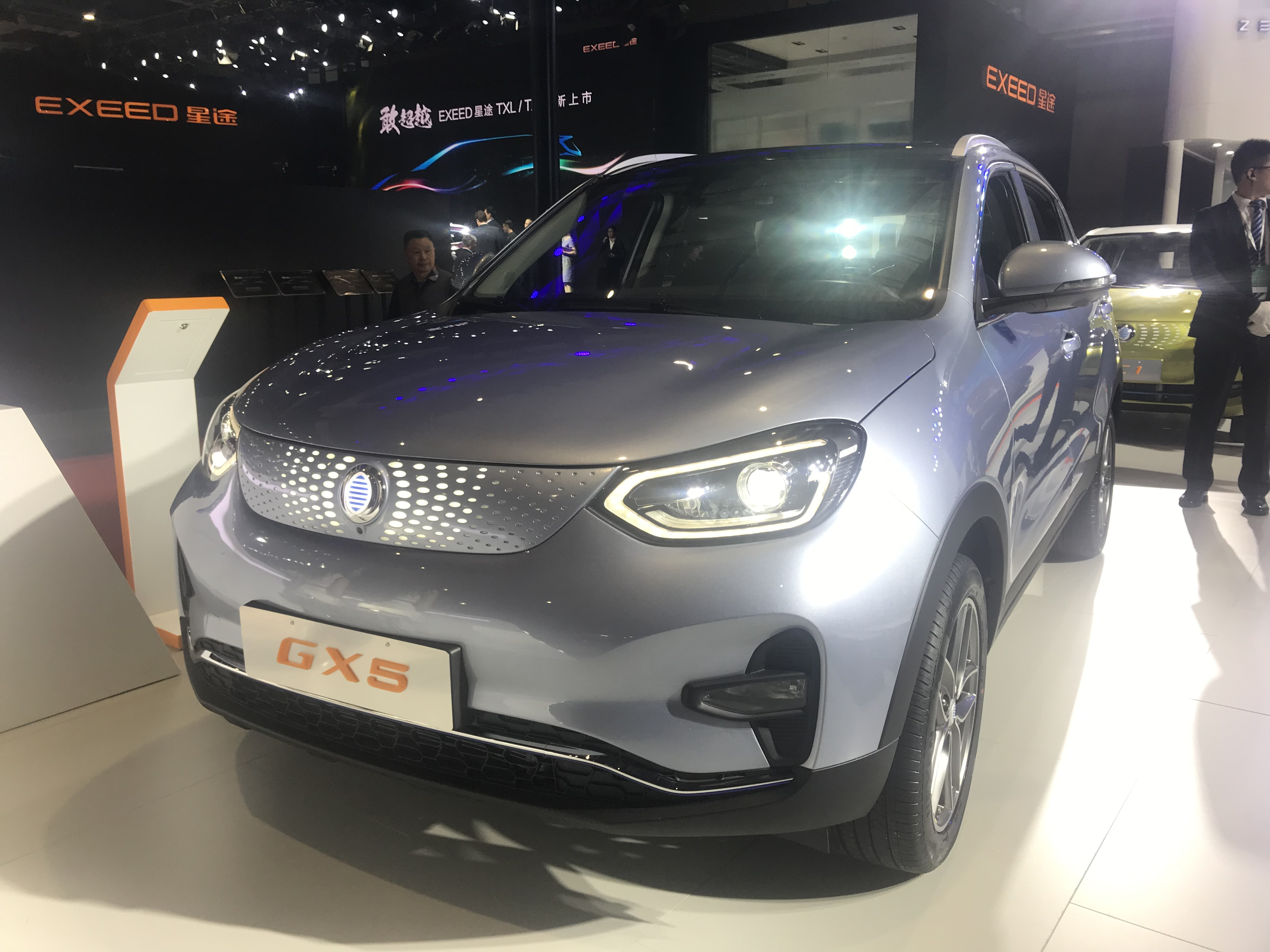
GX5

== See also ==
- Yulu
- Youxia Motors
- Ciwei
