= K60 =

K60 or K-60 may refer to:

- K-60 (Kansas highway), a state highway in Kansas
- Karry K60, a car
- K-60, a variant of the GMC CCKW 2½-ton 6×6 truck
