= Zedriv GC2 =

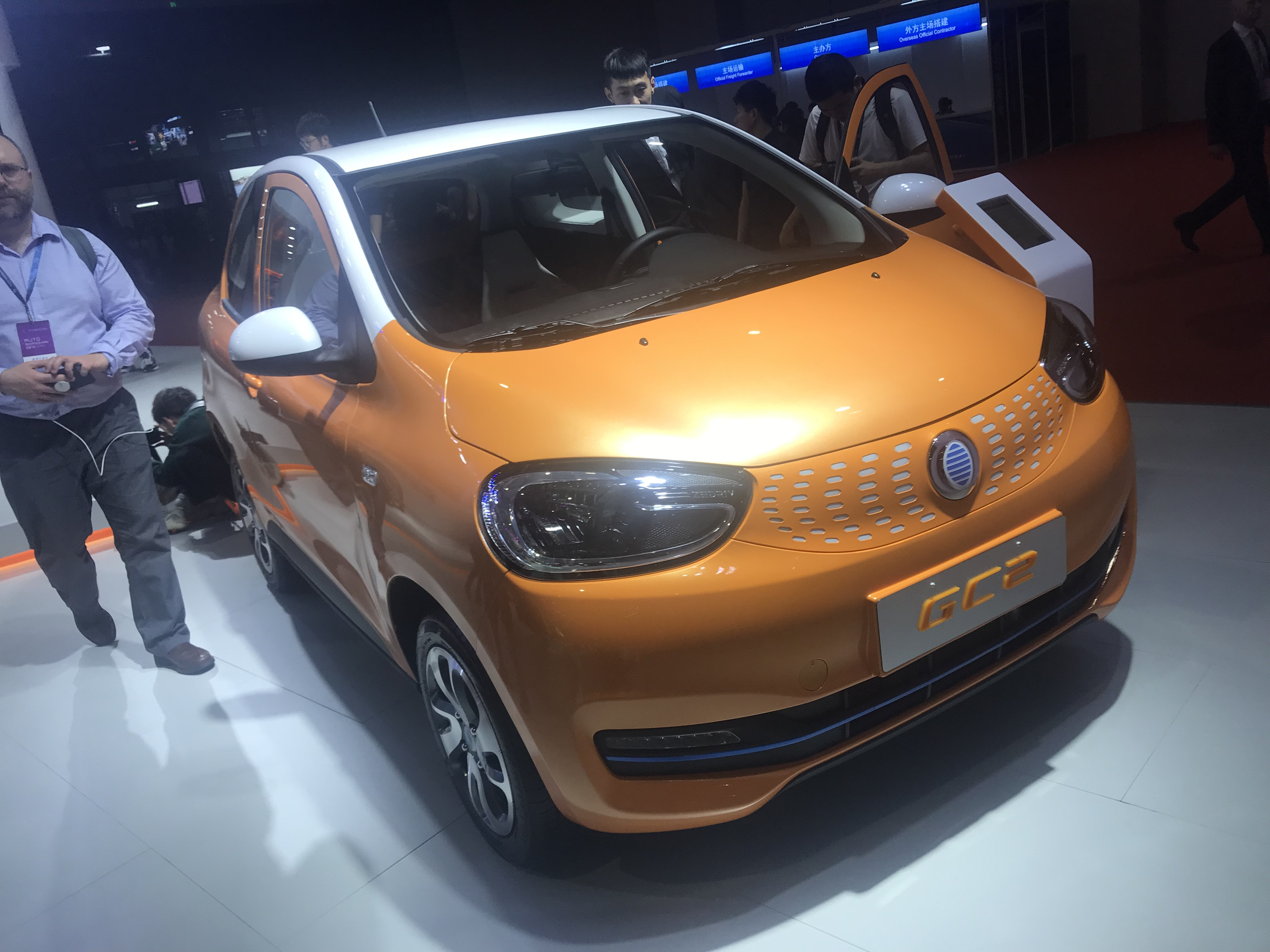

Overview
- Manufacturer: Zedriv≠
- Production: 2020
- Assembly: China
- Designer: Lorenz Bittner

Body and chassis
- Class: City Car (A)
- Body style: 3 door hatchback
- Layout: FWD
- Related: Zedriv GC1

Powertrain
- Engine: 36.2 kWh battery

Dimensions
- Wheelbase: 2,100 mm (82.7 in)
- Length: 3,310 mm (130.3 in)
- Width: 1,675 mm (65.9 in)
- Height: 1,535 mm (60.4 in)
- Curb weight: 1050 kg

The Zedriv GC2 (Chinese: 国机智骏 GC2) is an electric 3-door A-segment city car made by Zedriv. It is essentially the 3-door variant of the Zedriv GC1.

== Overview ==
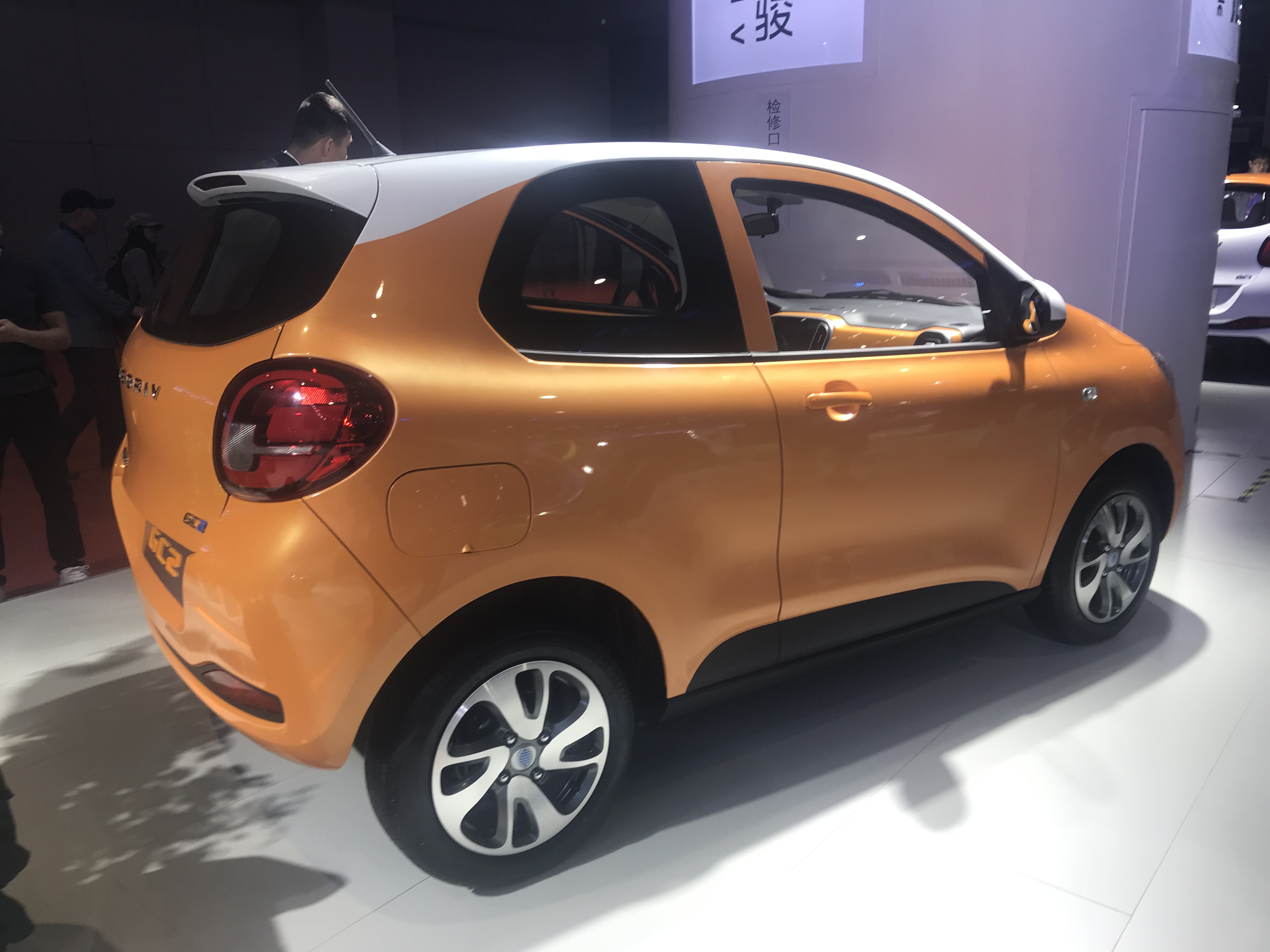

The Zedriv GC2 was shown at the 2019 Auto Shanghai. It has 3 doors and 2 seats with dimensions of 3310 mm/1675 mm/1535 mm, a wheelbase of 2100 mm, a ground clearance of 120 mm, and a weight of 1050 kg. The price of the Zedriv GC2 ranges from ¥65,800 to ¥81,800.

=== Performance ===
The GC2 has a range of 230 miles, 74 horsepower, FWD, a 36.2 kWh battery, 120 km/h top speed, a 50 km/h acceleration in 4.2 seconds.

== See also ==
- Zedriv GC1
- Zedriv GT3
- Zedriv GX5
