= Zedriv GC1 =

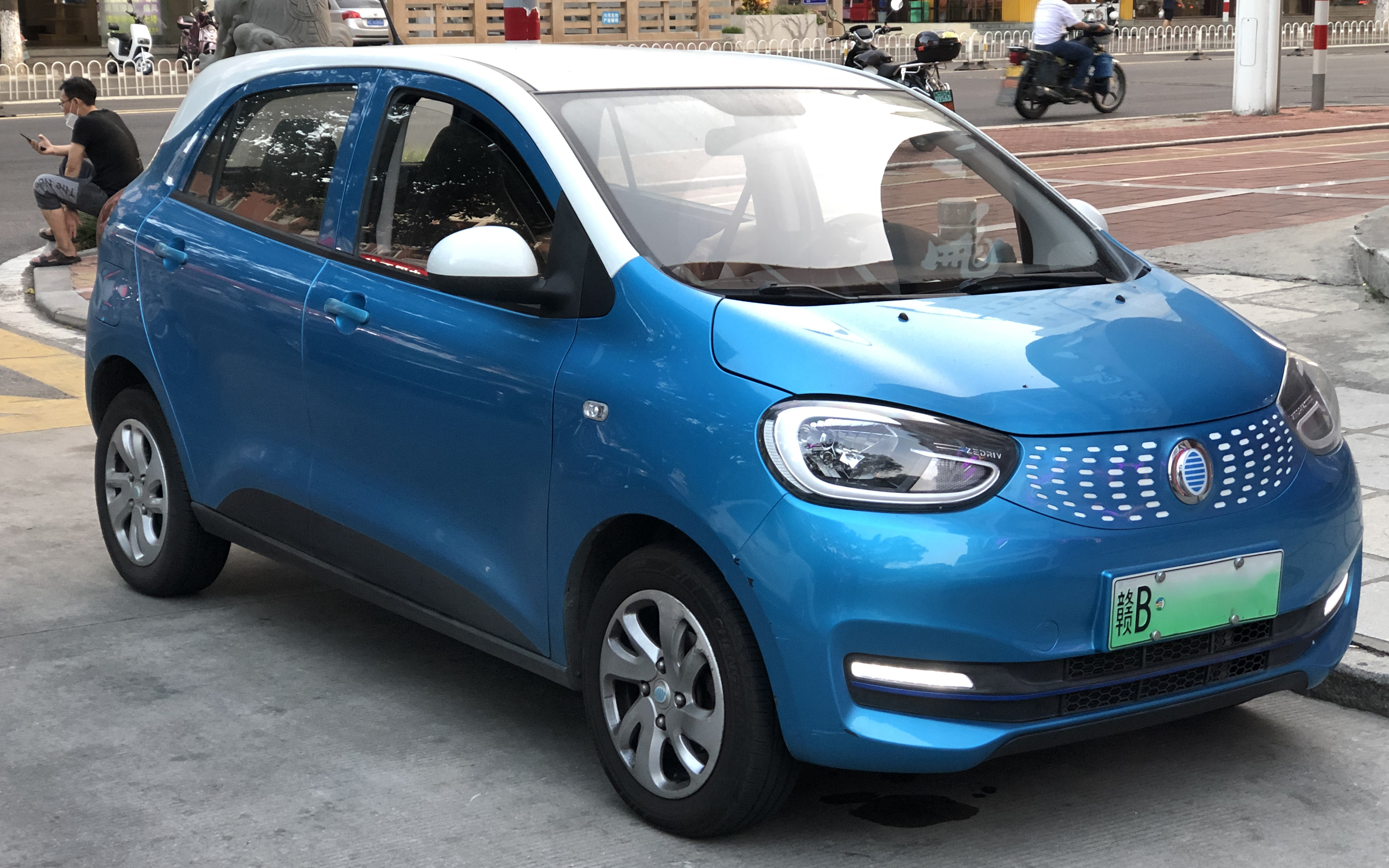

Overview
- Manufacturer: Zedriv
- Production: 2020–2022
- Assembly: China
- Designer: Lorenz Bittner

Body and chassis
- Class: Subcompact car
- Body style: 5 door hatchback
- Layout: FWD
- Related: Zedriv GC2

Powertrain
- Engine: 36.2 kWh battery

Dimensions
- Wheelbase: 2,500 mm (98.4 in)
- Length: 3,710 mm (146.1 in)
- Width: 1,675 mm (65.9 in)
- Height: 1,535 mm (60.4 in)
- Curb weight: 1130 kg

The Zedriv GC1 (Chinese: 国机智骏 GC1) is an electric 5-door subcompact car made by Zedriv. It is essentially the 5-door variant of the Zedriv GC2.

== Overview ==
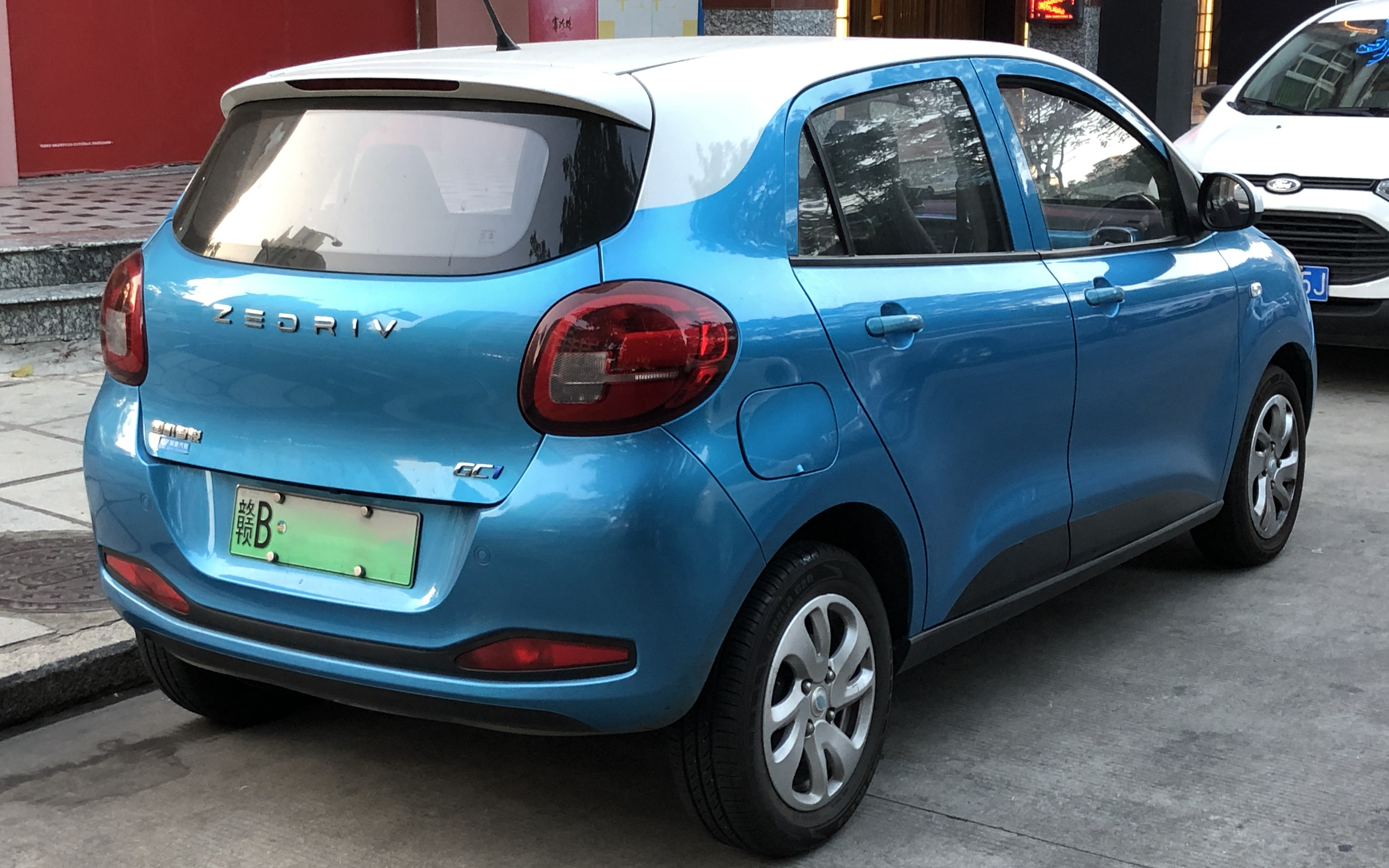
Rear view

The Zedriv GC1 was shown alongside the GC2 and GX5 at the 2019 Auto Shanghai. It has dimensions of 3710 mm/1675 mm/1535 mm, a wheelbase of 2500 mm, a ground clearance of 120 mm, and a weight of 1130 kg. The Zedriv GC1 has 5 doors and 4 seats and went into production in 2020 costing ¥68,800 to ¥83,800.

=== Performance ===
The Zedriv GC1 has a range of 211 miles, 74 horsepower, 36.2 kWh battery, FWD, 120 km/h top speed, and a 50 km/h acceleration in 4.2 seconds.

== Design ==
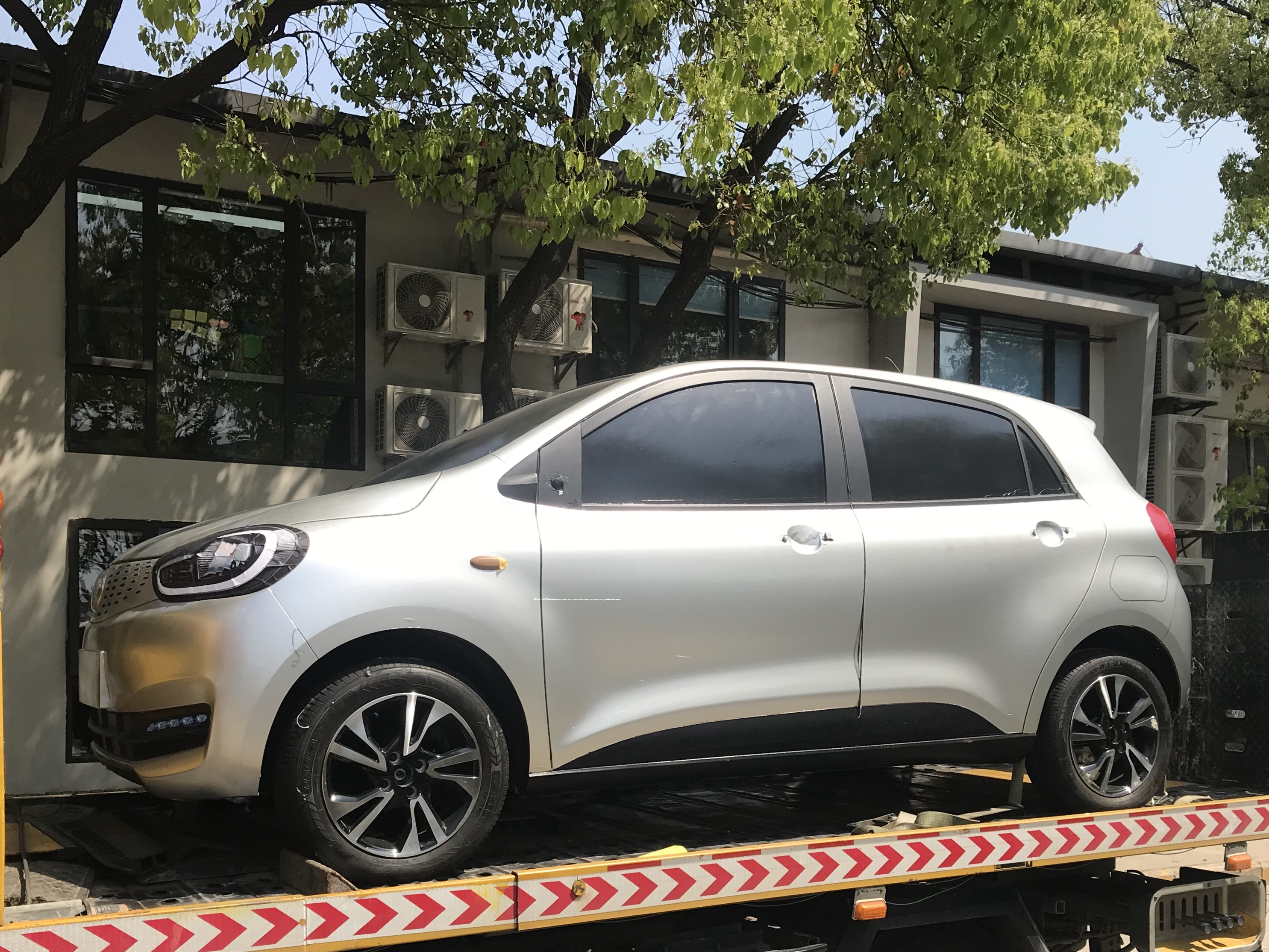
full-size clay design model of the GC1 in Shanghai

The design of Zedriv vehicles was done under the lead of their design chief, Lorenz Bittner, in Shanghai.

== See also ==
- Zedriv GC2
- Zedriv GT3
- Zedriv GX5
