= Zedriv GX5 =

Electric car

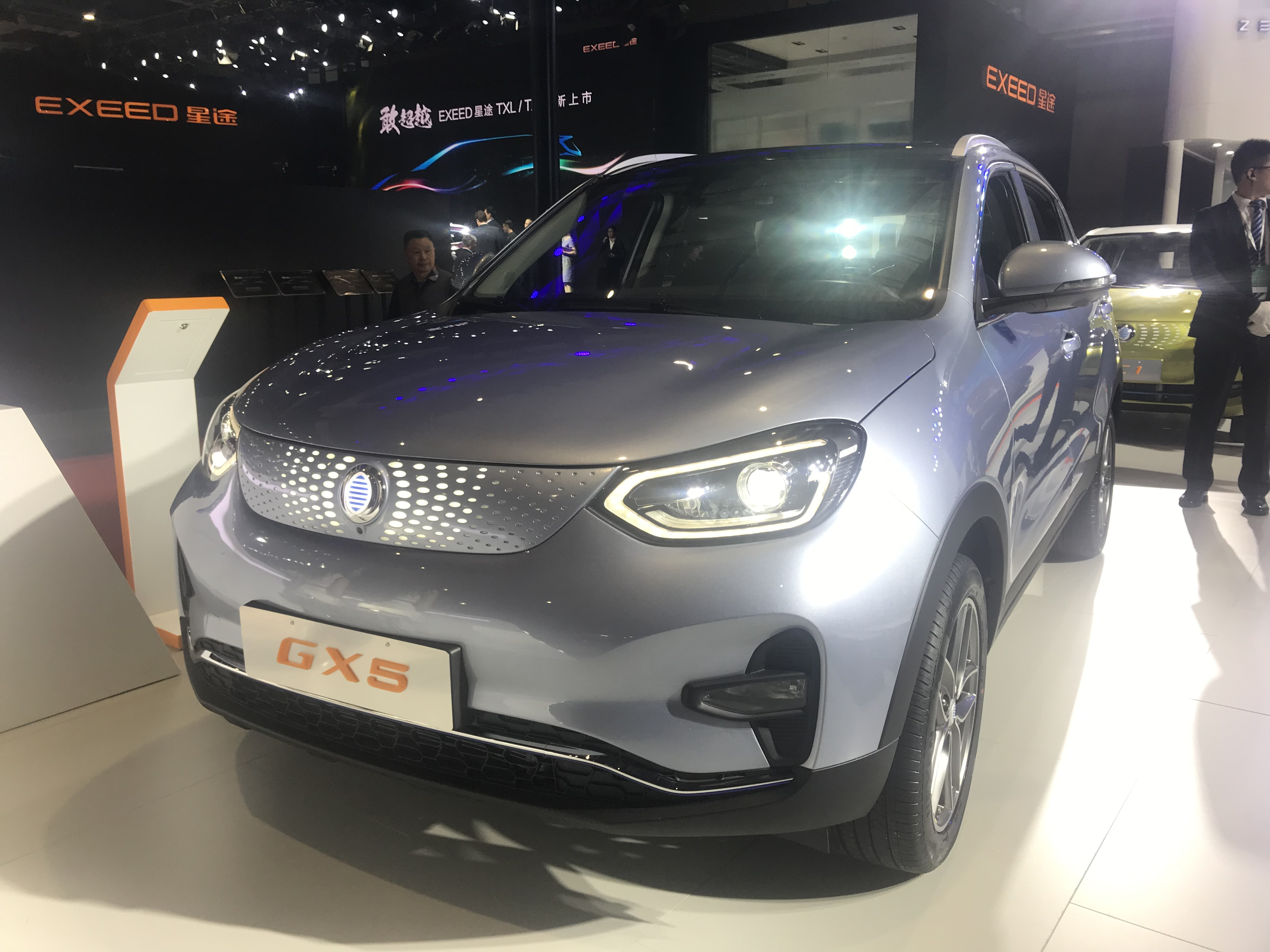

Overview
- Manufacturer: Zedriv
- Production: 2020
- Assembly: China
- Designer: Lorenz Bittner

Body and chassis
- Class: Subcompact crossover SUV (B)
- Body style: 5-door SUV
- Layout: FWD
- Doors: 5

Powertrain
- Engine: 46.4 kWh battery

Dimensions
- Wheelbase: 2,650 mm (104.3 in)
- Length: 4,150 mm (163.4 in)
- Width: 1,800 mm (70.9 in)
- Height: 1,611 mm (63.4 in)

The Zedriv GX5 (Chinese: 国机智骏 GX5) is an electric subcompact crossover SUV made by Zedriv.

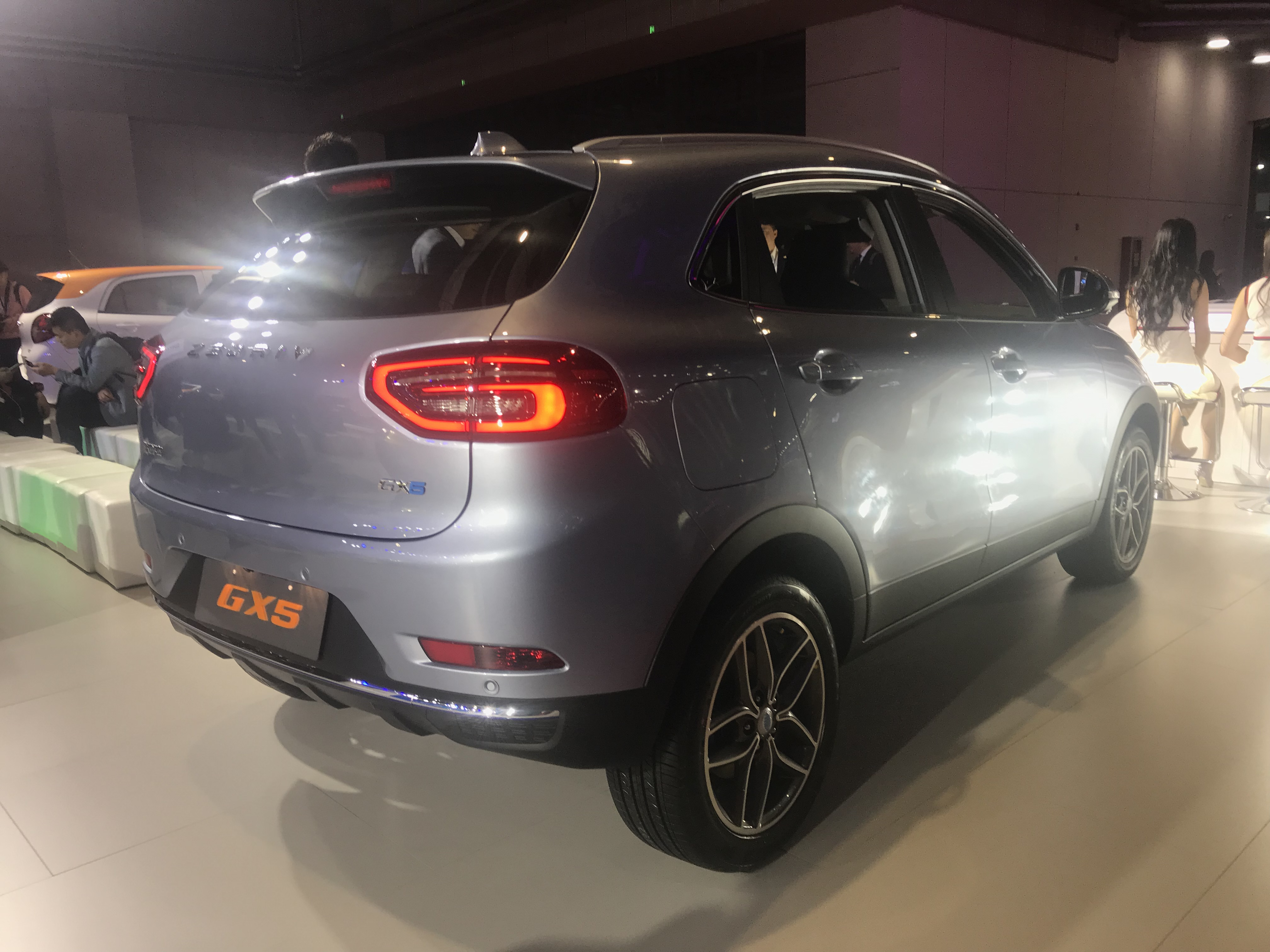

== Specifications ==
It has 5 doors and 5 seats. Its dimensions are 4150 mm/1800 mm/1611 mm. Its wheelbase is 2650 mm. Ground clearance is 150 mm.

Charging time is 7.5 hours with an onboard charger, or 1 hour at a charging station.

=== Powertrain ===
The FWD GX5 has a range of 211 miles. The motor offers 121 horsepower. powered by a 46.4 kWh battery. Top speed is 140 km/h. It accelerates from 0 to 50 km/h in 3.9 seconds.

== See also ==
- Zedriv GC1
- Zedriv GC2
- Zedriv GT3
