= Zedriv GT3 =

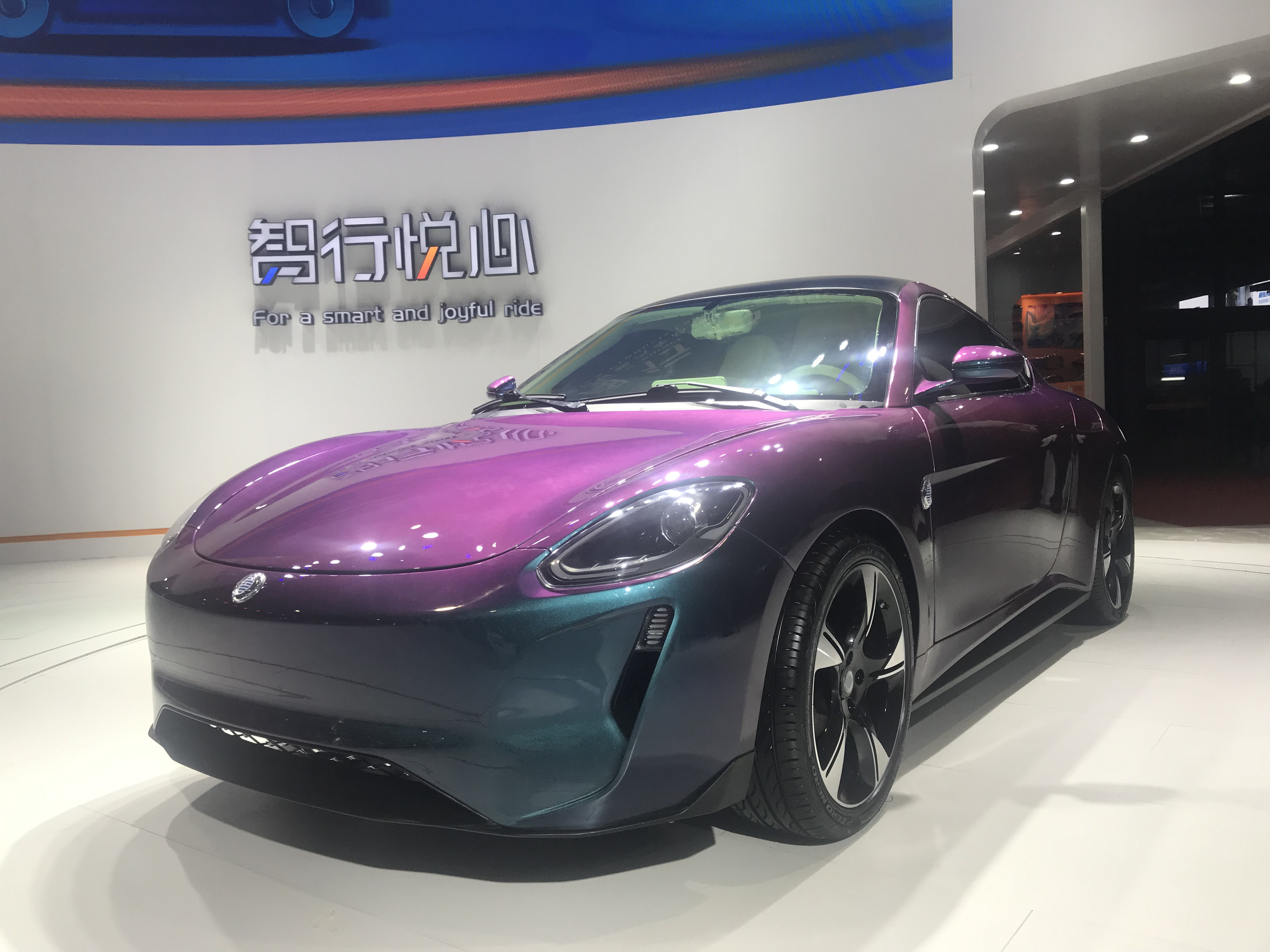

Overview
- Manufacturer: Zedriv
- Production: 2019 concept car
- Assembly: China

Body and chassis
- Class: Sports car (S-segment)
- Body style: coupe
- Doors: 2

Powertrain
- Engine: 33.9 kWh battery

Dimensions
- Wheelbase: 2,380 mm (93.7 in)
- Length: 4,000 mm (157.5 in)
- Width: 1,650 mm (65.0 in)
- Height: 1,280 mm (50.4 in)
- Curb weight: 1150 kg

The Zedriv GT3 (Chinese: 国机智骏 GT3) is an electric sports car concept made by the Chinese car company Zedriv.

== Overview ==
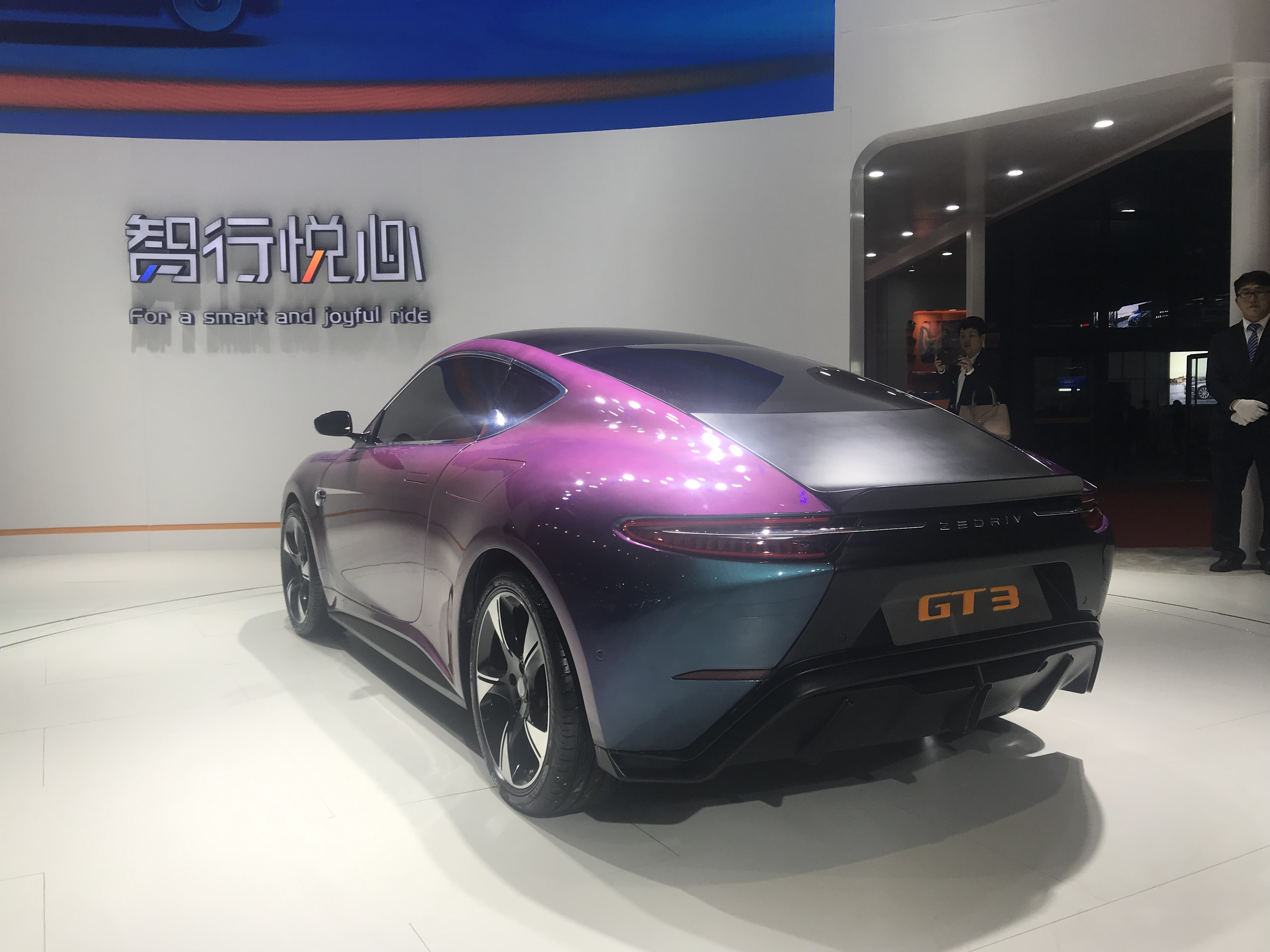

The Zedriv GT3 was shown at the 2019 Auto Shanghai. It has 2 doors and 2 seats, and dimensions of 4000 mm/1650 mm/1280 mm, wheelbase of 2380 mm, with a weight of 1150 kg.

=== Performance ===
The Zedriv GT3 concept has a claimed range of 161 miles and is powered by a 131 bhp (98 kW; 133 PS) motor developing 129 lb⋅ft (175 N⋅m) of torque, and a 33.9 kWh battery. Zedriv claims a 0-62 mph (100 km/h) acceleration time of 7.6 seconds and a top speed of 99 mph (160 km/h).

=== Design ===
The design of the Zedriv GT3 EV was criticized to resemble the Porsche 911.

== See also ==
- Zedriv GC1
- Zedriv GC2
- Zedriv GX5
