= Karry K60 =

Chinese compact crossover

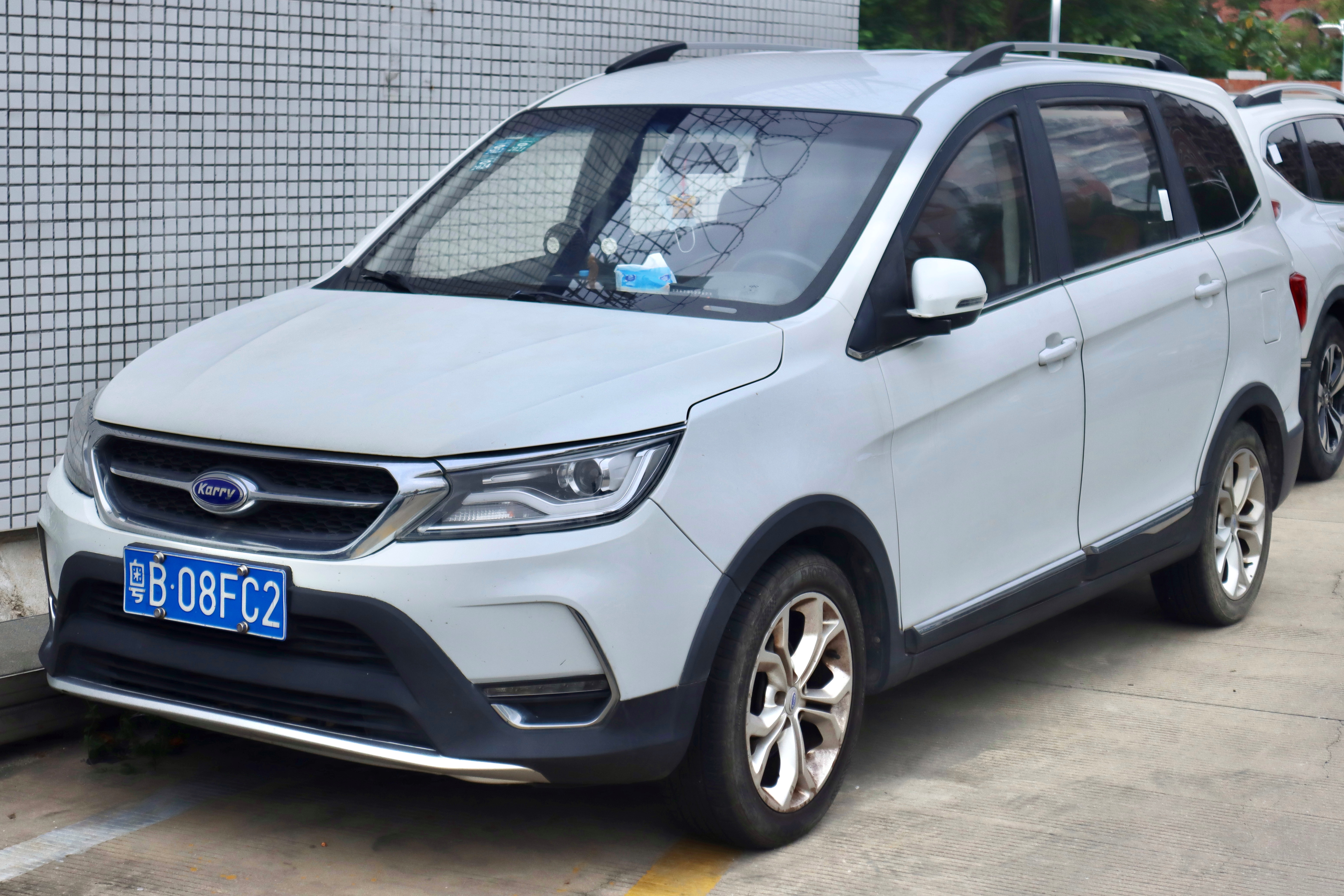
- Karry K60

Overview
- Manufacturer: Karry (Chery)
- Also called: Chery K60; Cowin V3; Ciwei EV400; ZX FM3
- Production: 2016–2025
- Assembly: China: Wuhu, Anhui

Body and chassis
- Class: Compact crossover SUV or Minivan
- Body style: 5-door station wagon
- Layout: Front-engine, front-wheel-drive
- Related: Karry K50

Powertrain
- Engine: 1.5 L D4G15C I4 (gasoline); 1.5 L E4T15C turbo I4 (gasoline)
- Electric motor: 80kW permanent electric motor (K60 EV)
- Transmission: 5-speed manual; 4-speed automatic

Dimensions
- Wheelbase: 2,765 mm (108.9 in)
- Length: 4,618 mm (181.8 in)
- Width: 1,790 mm (70.5 in)
- Height: 1,760 mm (69.3 in)

The Karry K60 is a compact crossover / minivan produced by Chery under the Karry brand.

== Overview ==
The Karry K60 is available in 5-, 6-, and 7-seater versions. The engine of the K60 is a 1.5 liter four-cylinder petrol engine with 109 hp (81 kW) and 140 nm, mated to a five-speed manual transmission powering the front wheels. Top speed of the K60 is 100 km/h (62 mph).

The Karry K60 was launched on the China car market in the third quarter of 2016 with prices starting from 58,800 yuan to 81,800 yuan. Despite the K60 being labeled as an SUV, the Karry K60 compact crossover is essentially a lifted MPV with plastic claddings built on a commercial minivan chassis sharing the underpinnings of the Cowin V3 MPV as Karry has always been Chery's commercial vehicle division.

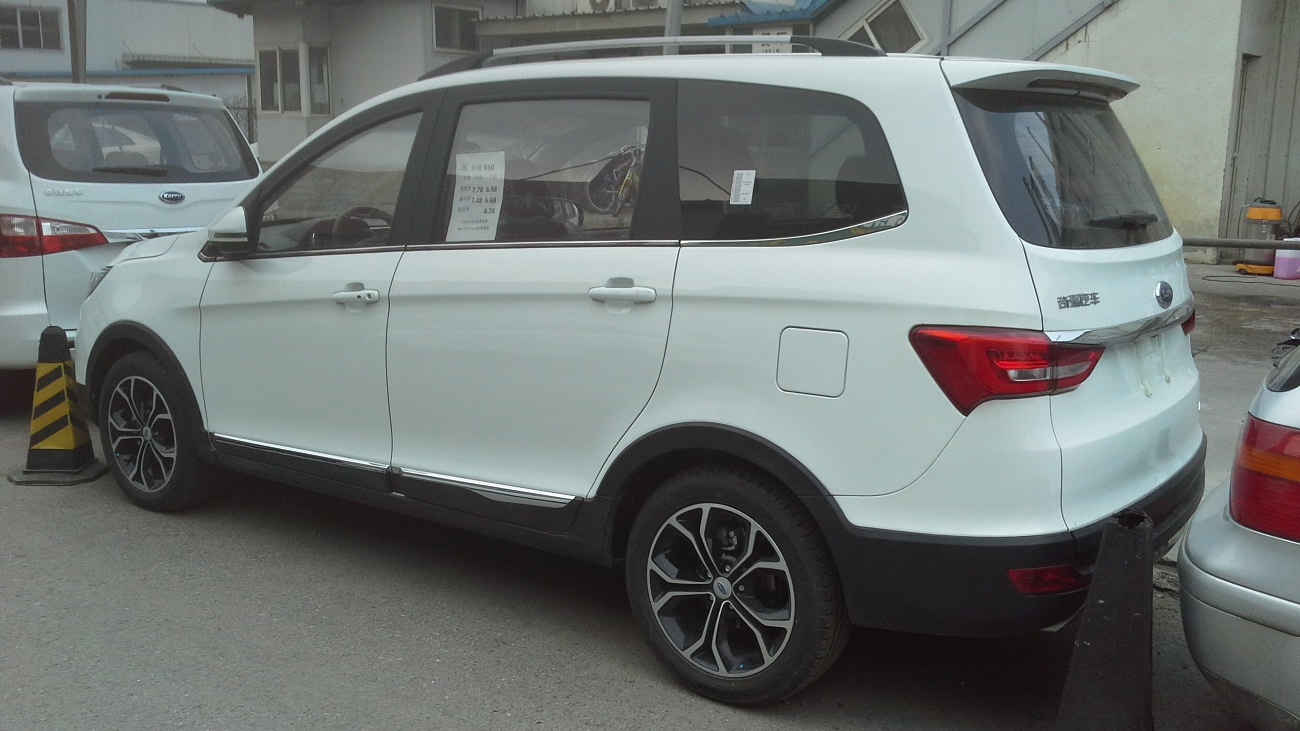
Karry K60 rear

== Karry K60 EV ==
The K60 EV is powered by an 80 kW permanent electric motor with 240N·m of torque and a top speed of 120 km/h (75 mph). The battery has a density of 182Wh/kg and is capable of a NEDC range of 301 km (187 mi). The DC fast charging takes 1.5 hours to charge the vehicles fully.

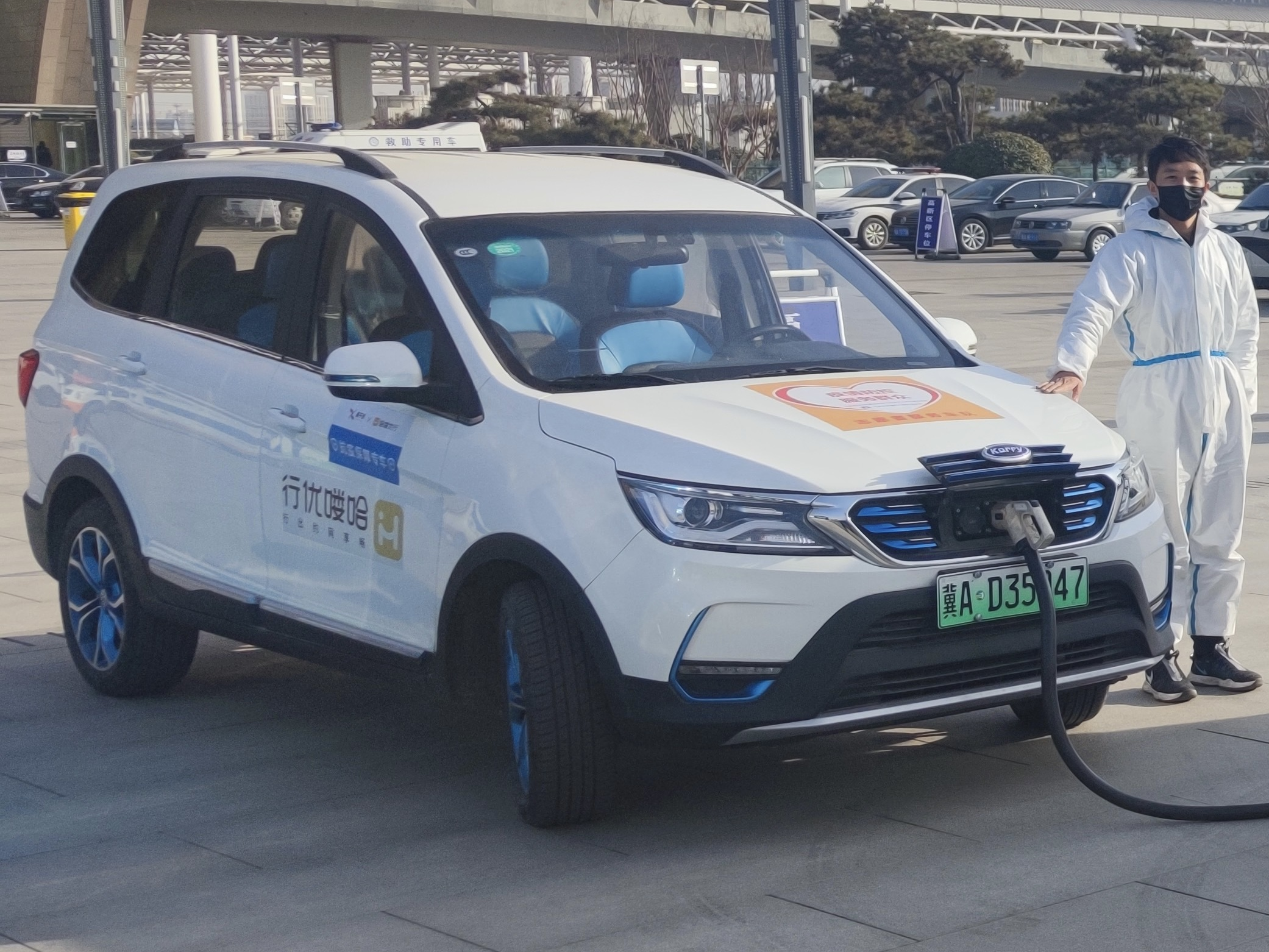
Karry K60 EV

== Ciwei EV400 ==
The Ciwei EV400 is an electric compact crossover MPV which is essentially a rebadged Karry K60 EV sold by Ciwei. It is powered by a 51 kWh battery that weighs 350 kg (770 lb), and has dimensions of 4,618 mm × 1,790 mm × 1,780 mm (181.8 in × 70.5 in × 70.1 in), a wheelbase of 2,765 mm (108.9 in), and a kerb weight of 1,611 kg (3,552 lb). The EV400 comes with an AI agent called "Little Hedgehog".
