= Ciwei =

Chinese automobile manufacturer

- Type: Private
- Traded as: Ciwei Auto
- Industry: Automotive
- Founded: 2018; 8 years ago
- Founder: Gong Shaohui
- Headquarters: Fujian
- Website: www.ciweiauto.com

Ciwei (Chinese: 刺猬) was a Chinese automobile manufacturer that specializes in developing electric vehicles. The name translates to "Hedgehog".

== History ==
Ciwei was founded in 2018, and is located in Fujian, China. It is a division of Xiamen Sanwu Internet Technology. Ciwei was founded with the help of Chery, and they produce vehicles with the help of Karry. Their slogan is "Make every drive a good memory".

The Ciwei Smile was their first vehicle, coming out in 2018. It is based on the Yudo π3, and was originally called and shown as the Simai’er. It has 122 horsepower, a range of 360 kilometers, and a top speed of 144 km/h. The Smile has dimensions of 4350 mm/1766 mm/1590 mm, and a wheelbase of 2600 mm.

The Ciwei EV400 is an electric compact crossover MPV based on the Karry K60 EV. It is powered by a 51 kWh battery that weighs 350 kg, and has dimensions of 4618 mm by 1790 mm by 1780 mm, a wheelbase of 2765 mm, and a kerb weight of 1611 kg. It has a charging time of 10 minutes. The EV400 also comes with an AI agent "Little Hedgehog".

== Vehicles ==
=== Production cars ===
Model	Photo	Specifications
Ciwei EV400		Body style: 5-door station wagon Class: Minivan (M) Doors: 5 Seats: 5 Battery: 51 kWh Production: 2020–2024 Revealed: 2020
Ciwei Smile		Body style: 5-door SUV Class: Subcompact crossover SUV Doors: 5 Seats: 5 Battery: 80 kW Production: 2018–2022 Revealed: 2018 Beijing Auto Show

== Sales ==
In 2020, Ciwei sold 20,000 units and made 3 billion yuan.

== See also ==
- GreenWheel EV
- Aoxin
