= Karry K50 =

Chinese compact MPV

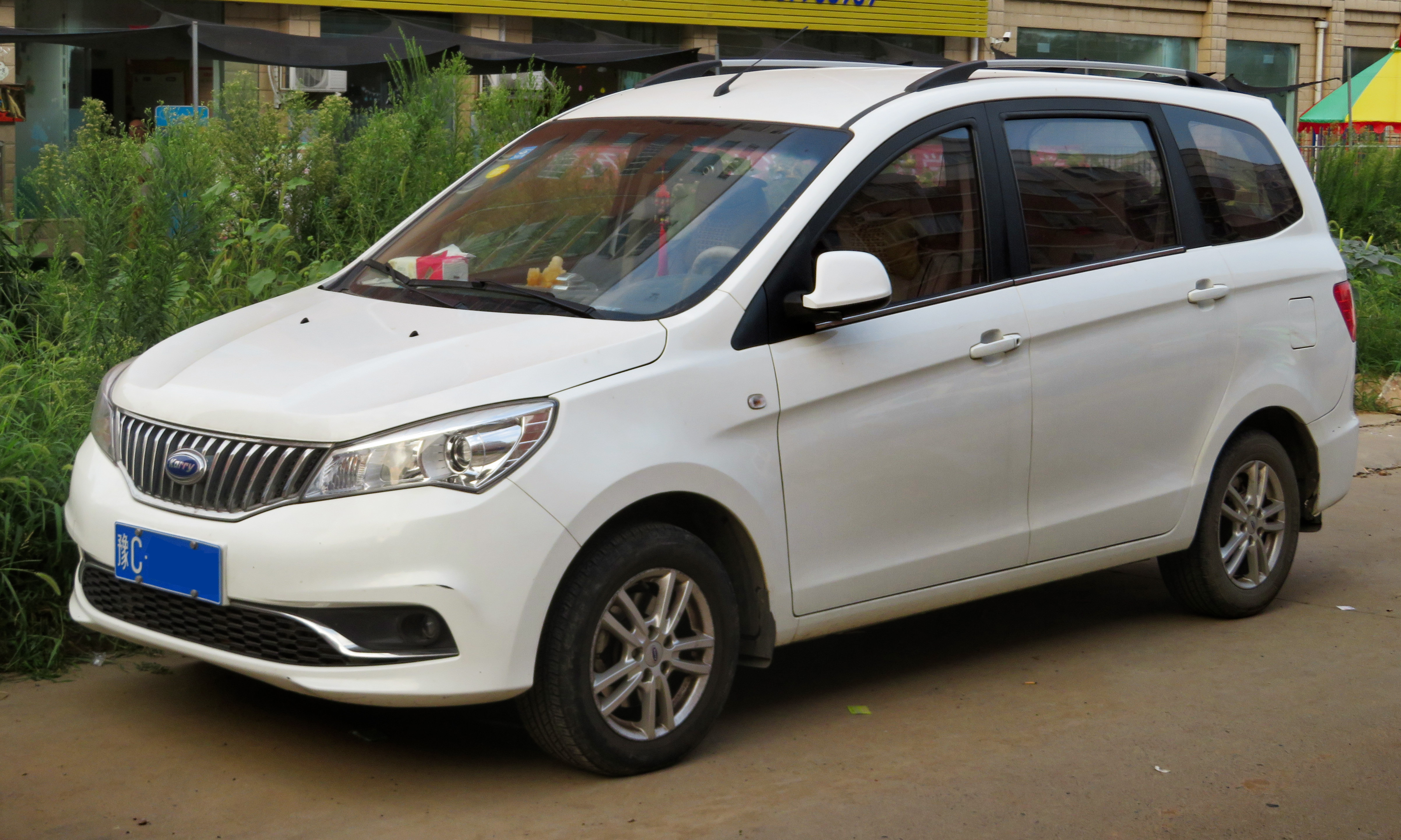

Overview
- Manufacturer: Karry (Chery)
- Production: 2015–2017
- Assembly: Wuhu, Anhui, China

Body and chassis
- Class: Compact MPV
- Body style: 5-door station wagon
- Layout: Front-engine, front-wheel-drive
- Related: Karry K60

Powertrain
- Engine: 1.5 L I4 (petrol)
- Transmission: 5-speed manual; 4-speed automatic

Dimensions
- Wheelbase: 2,755 mm (108.5 in)
- Length: 4,501 mm (177.2 in)
- Width: 1,760 mm (69.3 in)
- Height: 1,790 mm (70.5 in)
- Curb weight: 1,321 kg (2,912 lb)

The Karry K50 is a compact MPV produced by the Chinese manufacturer Chery Automobile under the Karry brand.

== Overview ==
The K50 is a seven-seat MPV that started rolling off the production line in Kaifeng, Henan, on September 2, 2014, and was available in showrooms in early 2015. The K50 is powered by an ACTECO 1.5-liter engine.

The Karry K50 was produced from January 2015 with a price range of 44,900 to 73,800 yuan. The Karry K50 also serves as the base of the Karry K60 crossover.

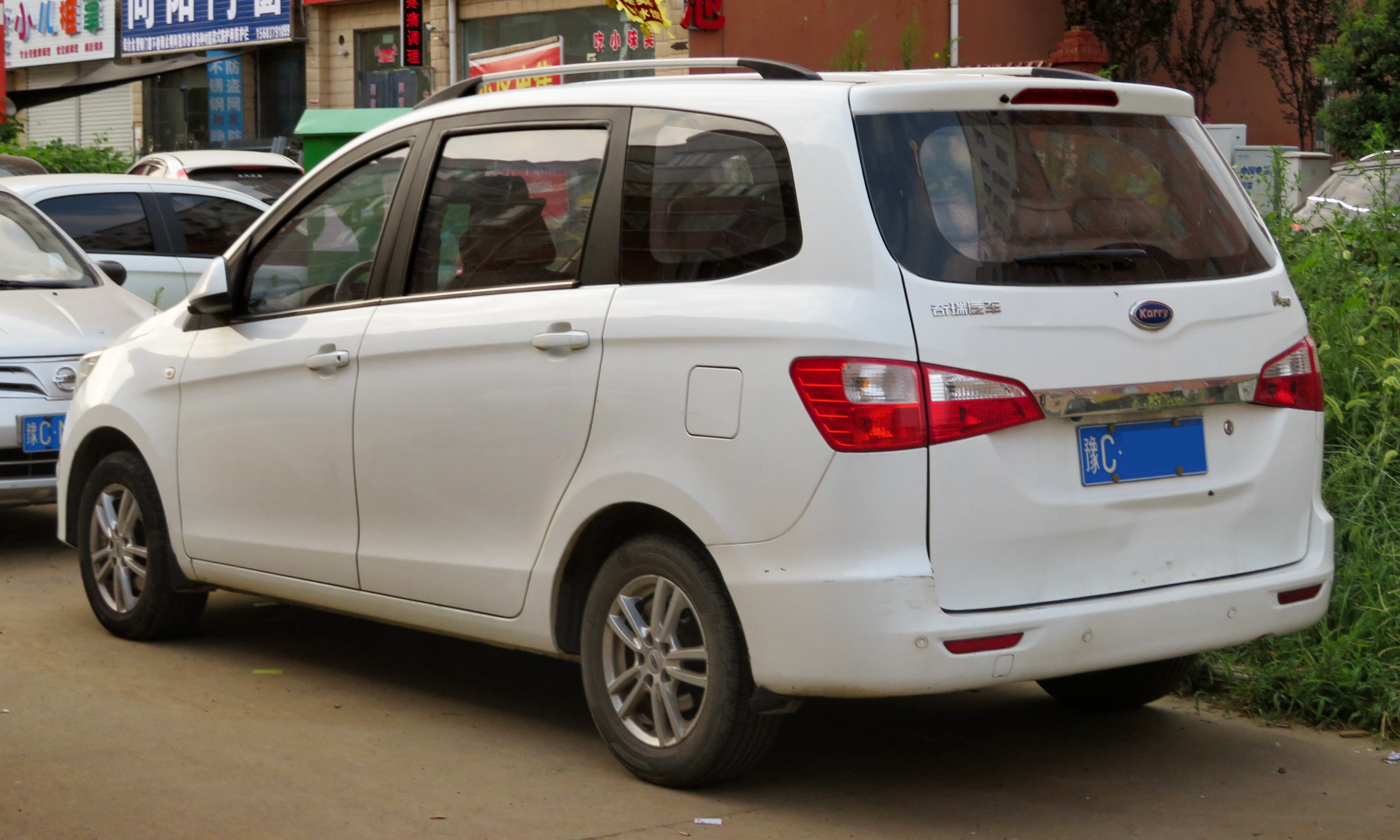
Karry K50 rear
