= Enovate =

Enovate may refer to:

- Pentafluoropropane spray foam insulation
- Enovate (marque), a Chinese electric vehicle brand
