= Enovate ME-S =

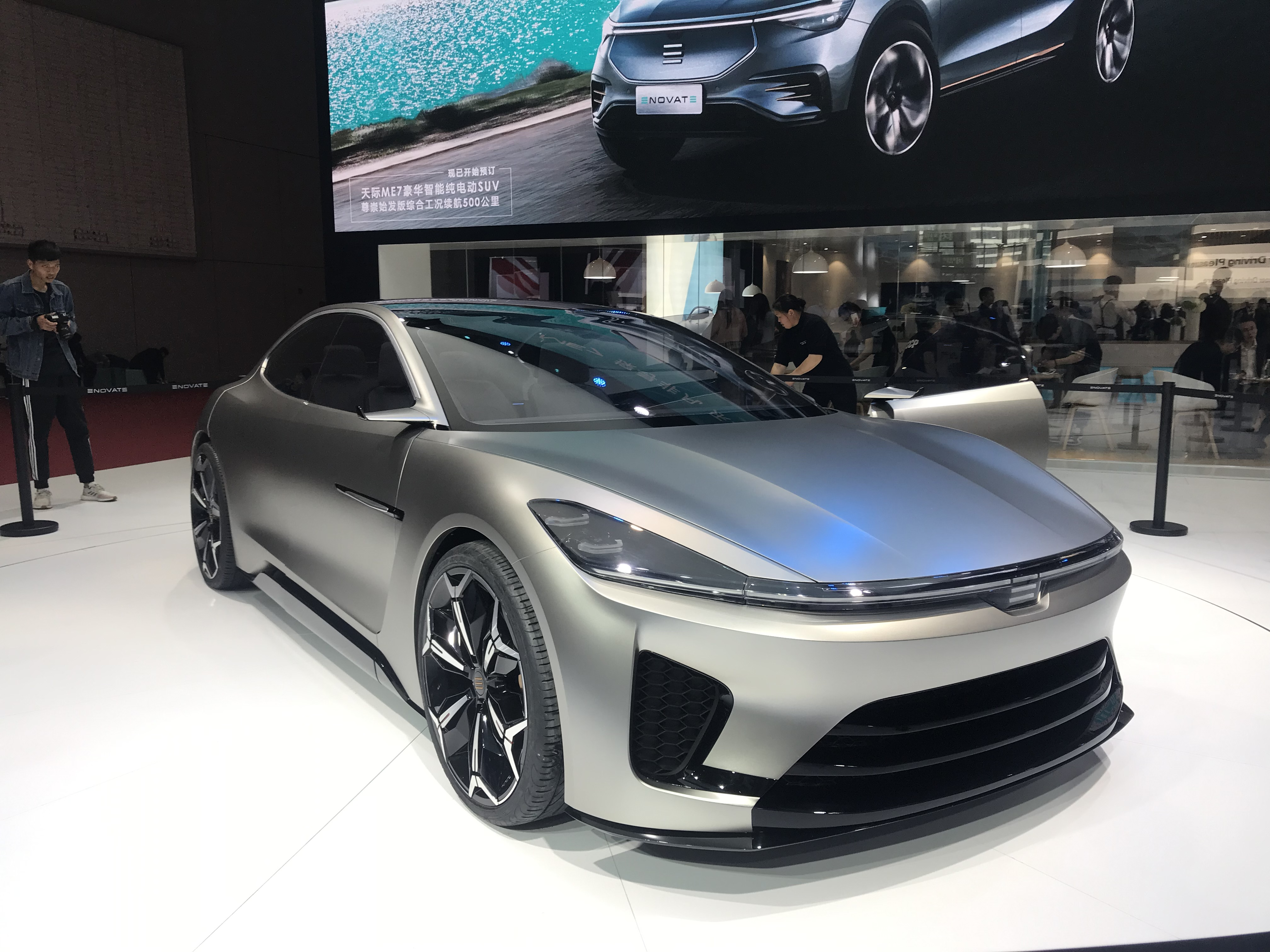

Overview
- Manufacturer: Enovate
- Also called: Enovate ME-Sports
- Assembly: China (Zhejiang Dianka Automobile Technology Co. Ltd.)
- Designer: Hakan Saraçoğlu; Ji-hoon Kim

Body and chassis
- Class: Luxury sedan concept
- Body style: 4-door sedan
- Layout: Dual-motor, AWD
- Doors: Conventional doors (front); Coach doors (rear)

Powertrain
- Electric motor: 2x Permanent magnet synchronous motor
- Battery: Solid-State battery 800 V pack

The Enovate ME-S, known fully as the Enovate ME-Sports, was an electric concept vehicle developed by Chinese manufacturer Enovate.

== Overview ==
The Enovate ME-S is a 4-door sports car concept shown at the 2019 Auto Shanghai.

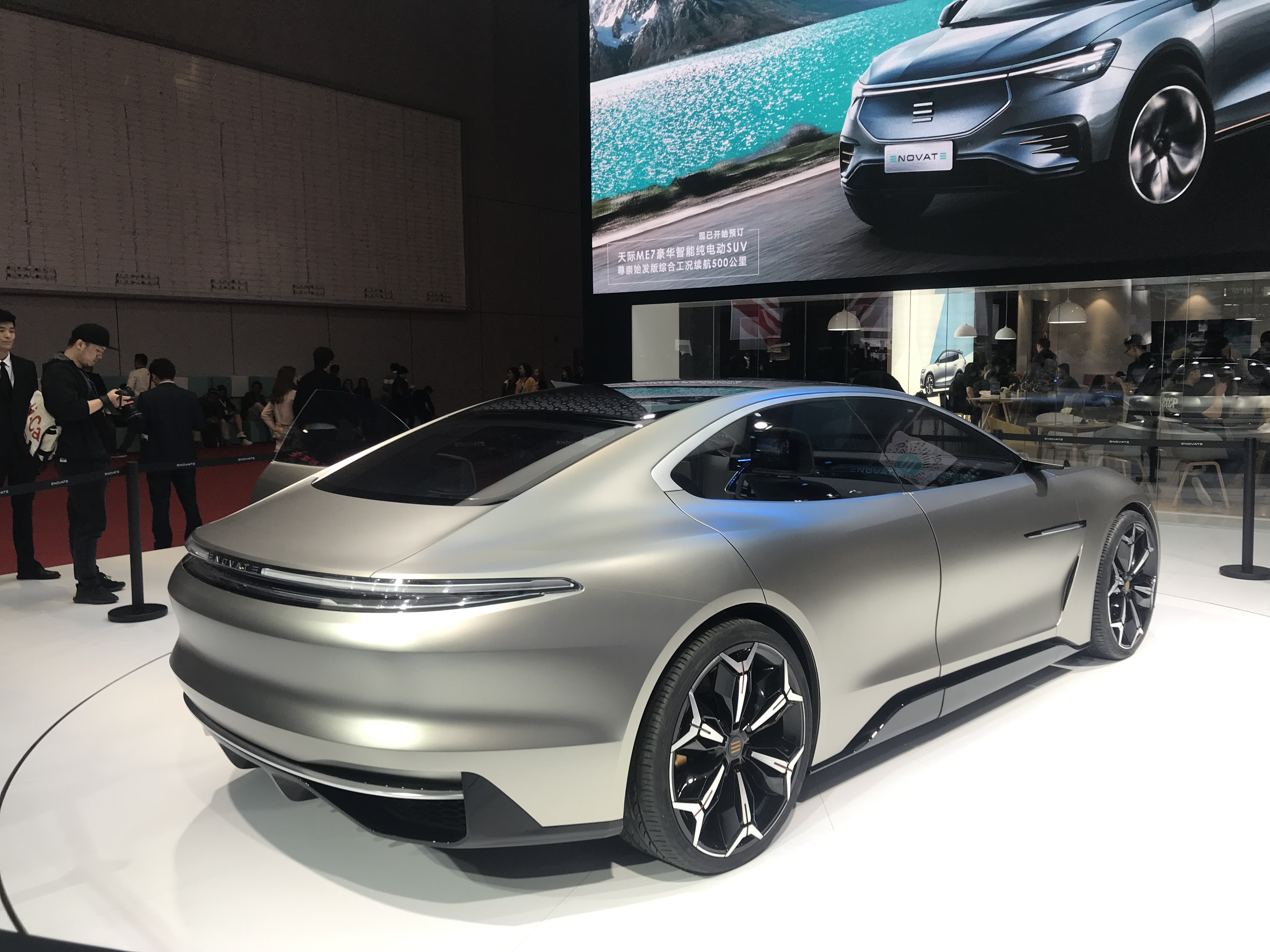
Rear view

== Production plans ==
It was planned to go into production in 2021. The planned production ME-S model can go 0–62 mph (0–100 km/h) in 3 seconds, can charge up to 80% in 15 minutes, and has a Level 4 autonomy. It costs $55,000.
