= Dearcc EV10 =

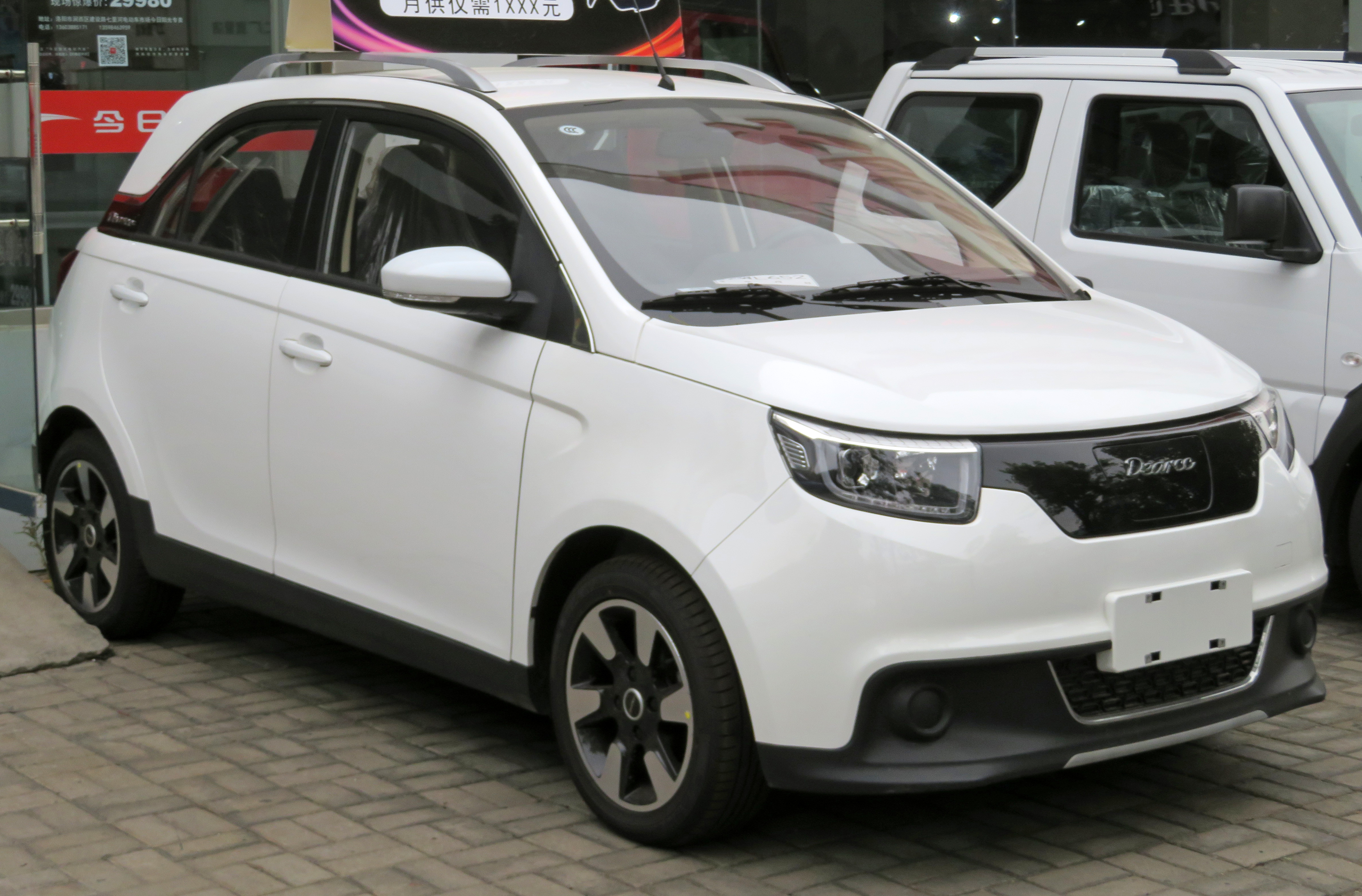
- Dearcc EV10 in China

Overview
- Manufacturer: Dearcc
- Also called: Dearcc EV10 Pro300
- Production: 2017–2018
- Assembly: China: Shaoxing, Zhejiang

Body and chassis
- Class: City car
- Body style: 5-door hatchback
- Layout: Front-engine, front-wheel-drive

Powertrain
- Electric motor: AC permanent magnet synchronous
- Power output: 42 kW (57 hp)
- Transmission: 1-speed direct-drive
- Battery: Li-ion battery

Dimensions
- Wheelbase: 2,400 mm (94.5 in)
- Length: 3,692 mm (145.4 in)
- Width: 1,650 mm (65.0 in)
- Height: 1,532 mm (60.3 in)
- Kerb weight: 1,080 kg (2,381 lb)

The Dearcc EV10 was an electric city car engineered and produced by the Chinese electric car manufacturer Dearcc. It was launched in the Chinese market on November 17, 2017, and the range extended version called the Dearcc EV10 Pro300 was launched on July 7, 2018.

== Overview ==
The Dearcc brand officially debut in November 2016 on the 2016 Guangzhou Auto Show. The Dearcc EV10 was powered by an electric motor manufactured by the Shanghai Edrive Corporation with the motor's factory designation TZ200XS03Z. The TZ200XS03Z electric motor has an output of 42 kW (57 hp) and 150 N⋅m (111 lb⋅ft) of torque, and can produce enough power for the Dearcc EV10 to reach a top speed of 100 km/h (62 mph). Prices of the Dearcc EV10 electric city car ranges from 115,900 yuan to 123,900 yuan at launch in 2017.

Rear

== Design controversies ==
The Dearcc EV10 electric city car is a controversial car from the styling point of view, as it heavily resembles the Opel Adam from the rear quarter. Chinese automotive manufacturers were known to reverse engineer cars from other brands which result in similar looking cars that were often refer to being a replica or copycat when it comes to styling. Despite the size difference and the fact that the Dearcc EV10 has 5 doors instead of 3, the only obvious styling difference is the front fascia.

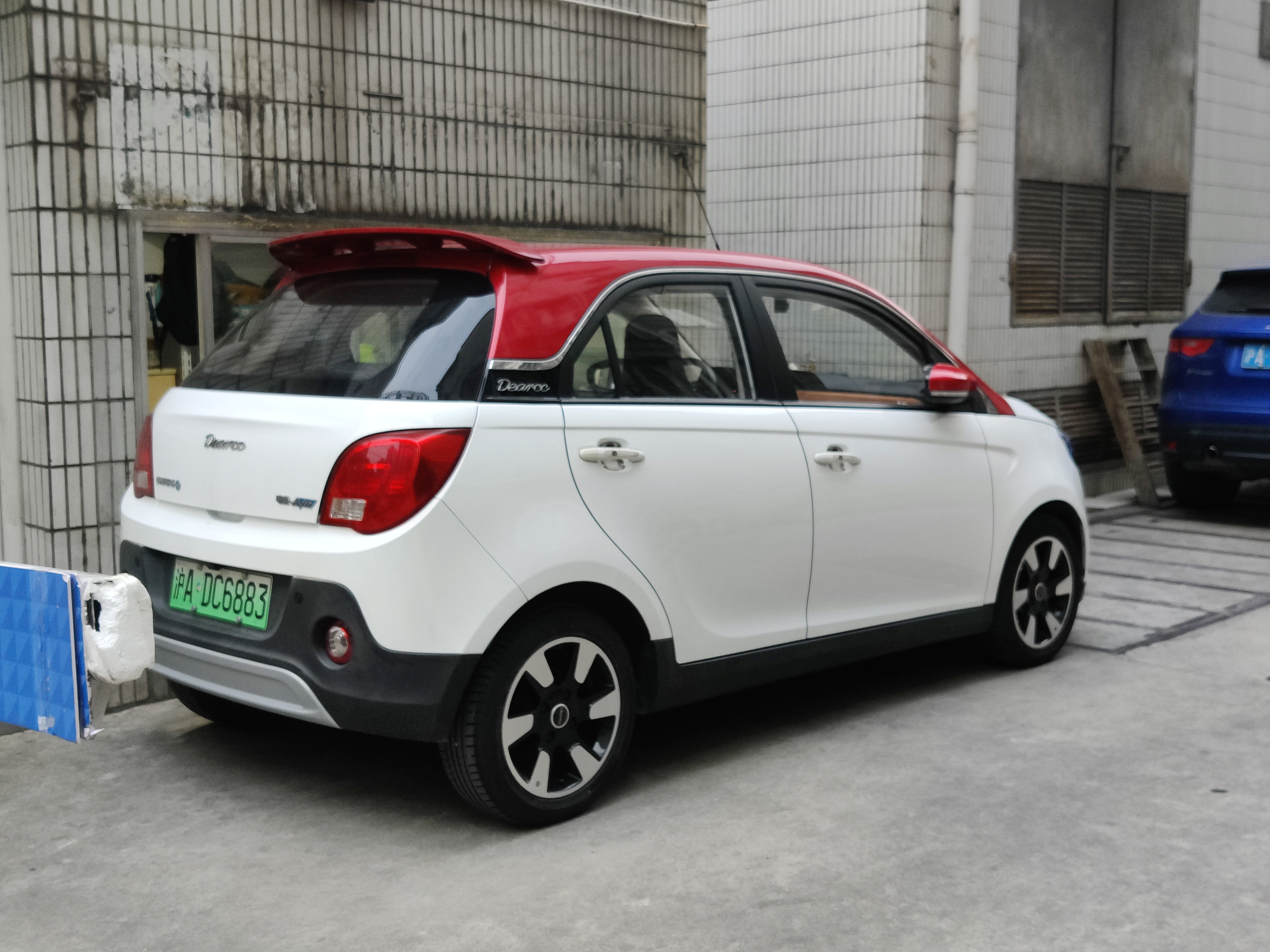
Dearcc EV10 rear quarter

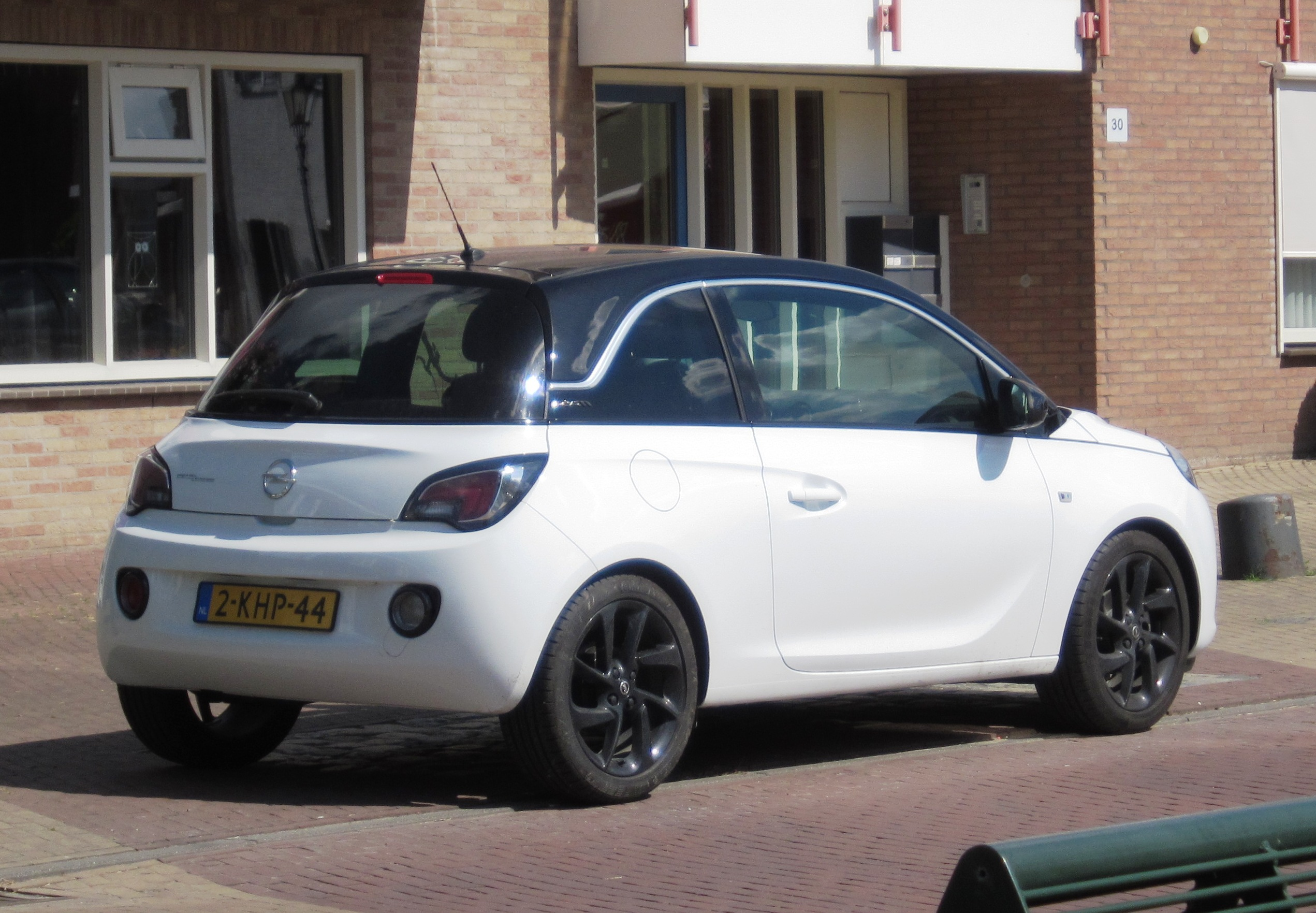
Opel Adam for comparison
