= Enovate ME5 =

Chinese electric compact crossover utility vehicle

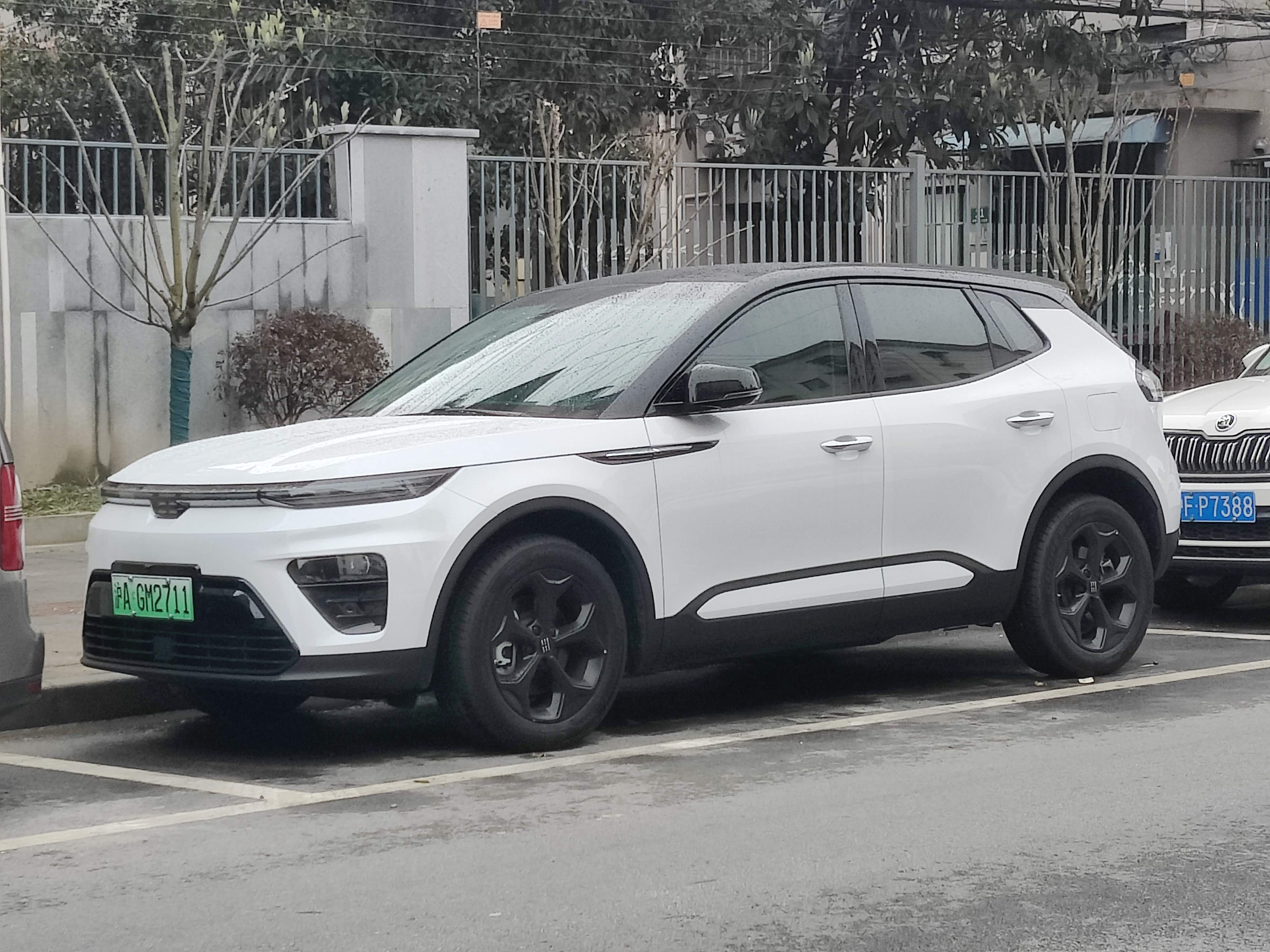
- Enovate ME5 in Shanghai

Overview
- Manufacturer: Enovate
- Production: 2021–2024
- Assembly: China: Changsha
- Designer: Hakan Saracoğlu

Body and chassis
- Class: Compact crossover SUV (C)
- Body style: 5-door SUV
- Layout: Front-engine + Rear-motor, rear-wheel-drive

Powertrain
- Engine: Petrol PHEV: 1.5 L I4
- Electric motor: Permanent Magnet Synchronous Reluctance Motor
- Power output: 150 kW (201 hp; 204 PS)
- Transmission: Automatic
- Battery: 30.6 kWh (li-ion)
- Electric range: 1012 km (629 mi)

Dimensions
- Wheelbase: 2,750 mm (108 in)
- Length: 4,580 mm (180 in)
- Width: 1,915 mm (75 in)
- Height: 1,635 mm (64 in)
- Curb weight: 1998 kg (4405 lbs)

The Enovate ME5 is a plug-in hybrid electric compact crossover SUV manufactured by Chinese manufacturer Enovate. It is positioned below the slightly larger and claimed to be mid-sized Enovate ME7. The production ME5 started sales on 27 August 2021.

Before the ME5 was unveiled, Enovate registered the Enoreve brand name as a more patent-unencumbered option, while the brand remains to be Enovate.

== Overview ==
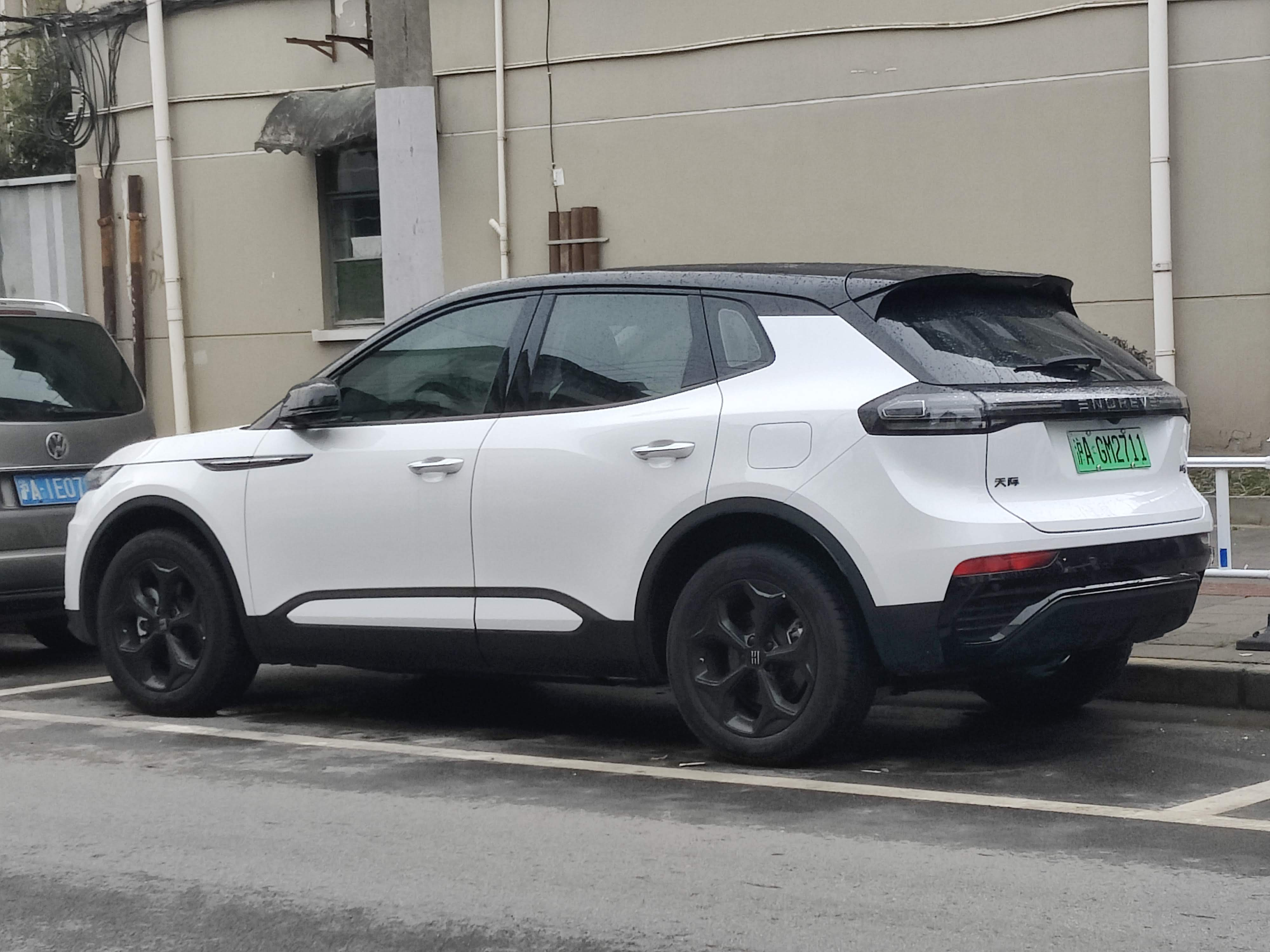
Enovate ME5 rear

The ME5 has a petrol range extender called the iMES Smart Range Extender System, and it is a 1.5L engine with 72 kW of power. Combined engine power is 150 kW. The ME5 battery capacity is 30.6kWh, and the pure electric range is 155 km. With the range extender, it is capable of going 1012 km with a full battery and full tank of fuel.

== Specifications ==
The entry level version of the ME5 is powered by a 204-PS (201-hp / 150-kW) electric motor plugged into a 30.6-kWh traction battery. In the top of the trim configuration, a 1.5-liter petrol engine unit with 98 hp acts as a range extender.

== Sales ==
The ME5 was produced in Enovate's plant in Changsha, China. In May 2021, Enovate announced a strategic cooperation with Chinese e-commerce giant JD.com in digital marketing of their vehicles and smart product development. The cooperation lead to a luxury limited-edition Jingdong special edition reportedly offered for 159,900 yuan. For regular sales, two versions were available at launch, the ME5 1012 with a price of 149,900 yuan ($23,000) and the ME5 1012 Pro with a price of 159,900 yuan ($24,700).

== See also ==
- List of production battery electric vehicles
