= Enovate ME7 =

Chinese electric compact crossover utility vehicle

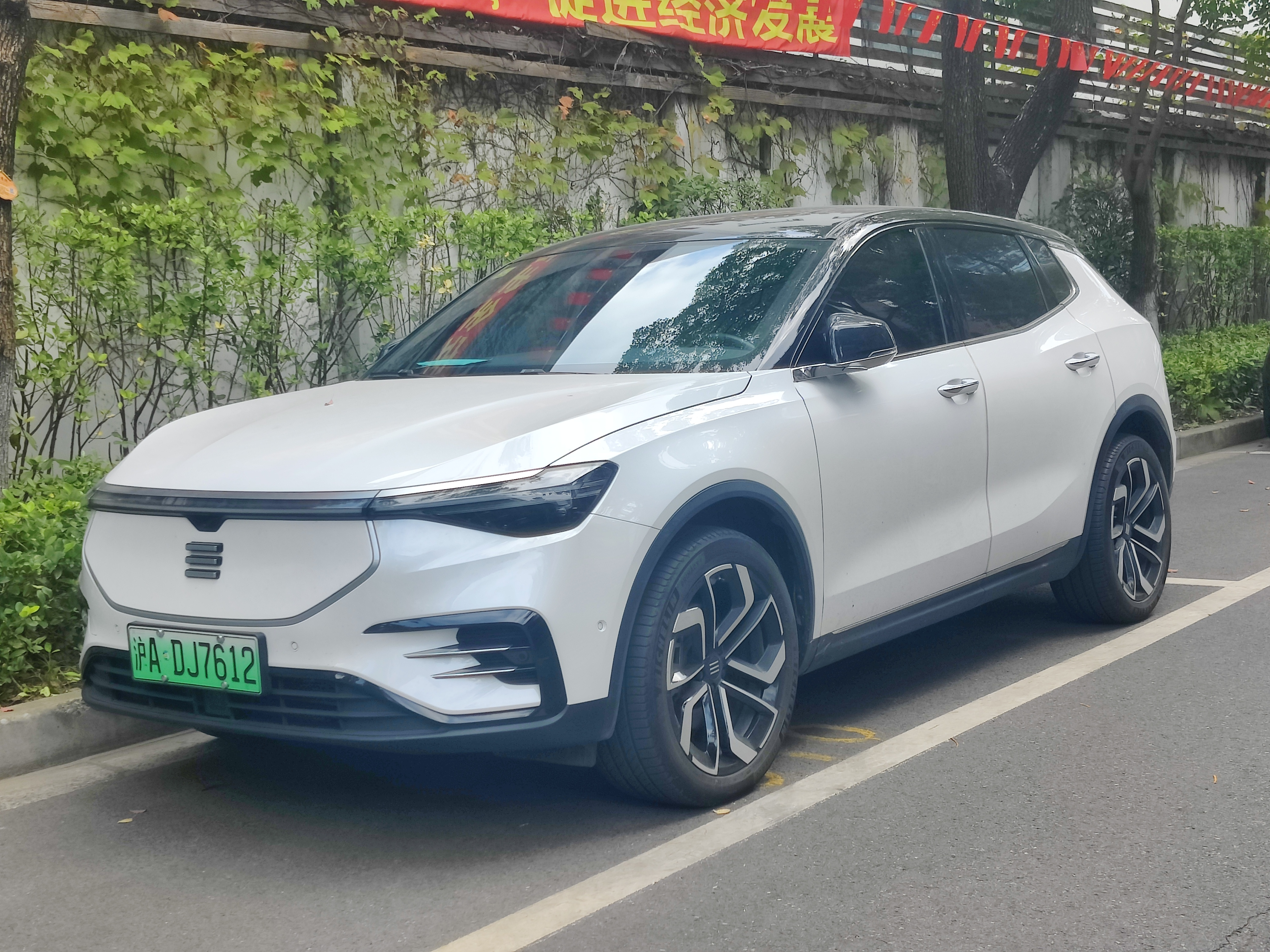
- Enovate ME7 in Shanghai

Overview
- Manufacturer: Enovate
- Production: 2019–2024
- Assembly: China: Shaoxing, Zhejiang
- Designer: Hakan Saracoğlu

Body and chassis
- Class: Compact crossover SUV
- Body style: 5-door SUV
- Layout: Front-motor, front-wheel drive

Powertrain
- Electric motor: Permanent Magnet Synchronous Reluctance Motor
- Electric range: 530 kilometres (329 mi) Long Range (NEDC-rated); 410 kilometres (255 mi) Standard Range (NEDC-rated)

Dimensions
- Wheelbase: 2,830 mm (111 in)
- Length: 4,685 mm (184 in)
- Width: 1,970 mm (78 in)
- Height: 1,660 mm (65 in)
- Curb weight: 1998 kg (4405 lbs)

The Enovate ME7 was an electric compact crossover SUV by Chinese manufacturer Enovate.

The ME7 was first presented at the 2019 ChinaEV100 Forum in Beijing in January 2019 as a Solid-State Battery concept car. The production ME7 model was unveiled at the 2019 Shanghai Auto Show, and the market launch was September 2020.

== Overview ==
The Enovate ME7 was claimed to be a midsize crossover in the Chinese market despite the dimensions being slightly smaller than the compact Tesla Model Y. The ME7 is powered by a permanent magnet synchronous motor with a maximum power of 170 kW. The NEDC cruising range of the long range model exceeds 530 km (310 miles). Additionally, the price range of Enovate ME7 is also announced during the reveal by Enovate Motors with prices ranging from 366,800 yuan to 381,800 yuan (~US$54,204 – US$56,420).

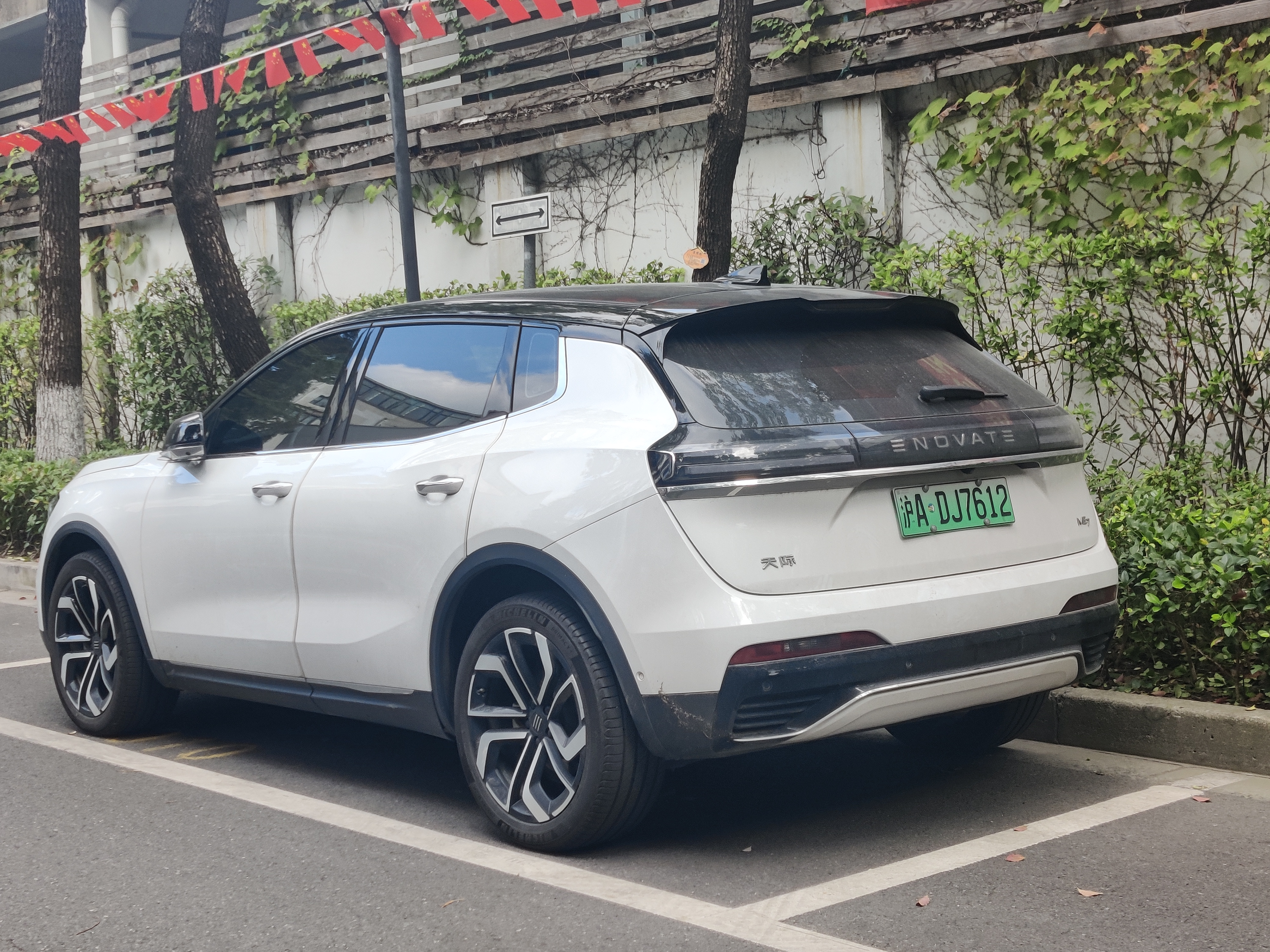
Enovate ME7 rear

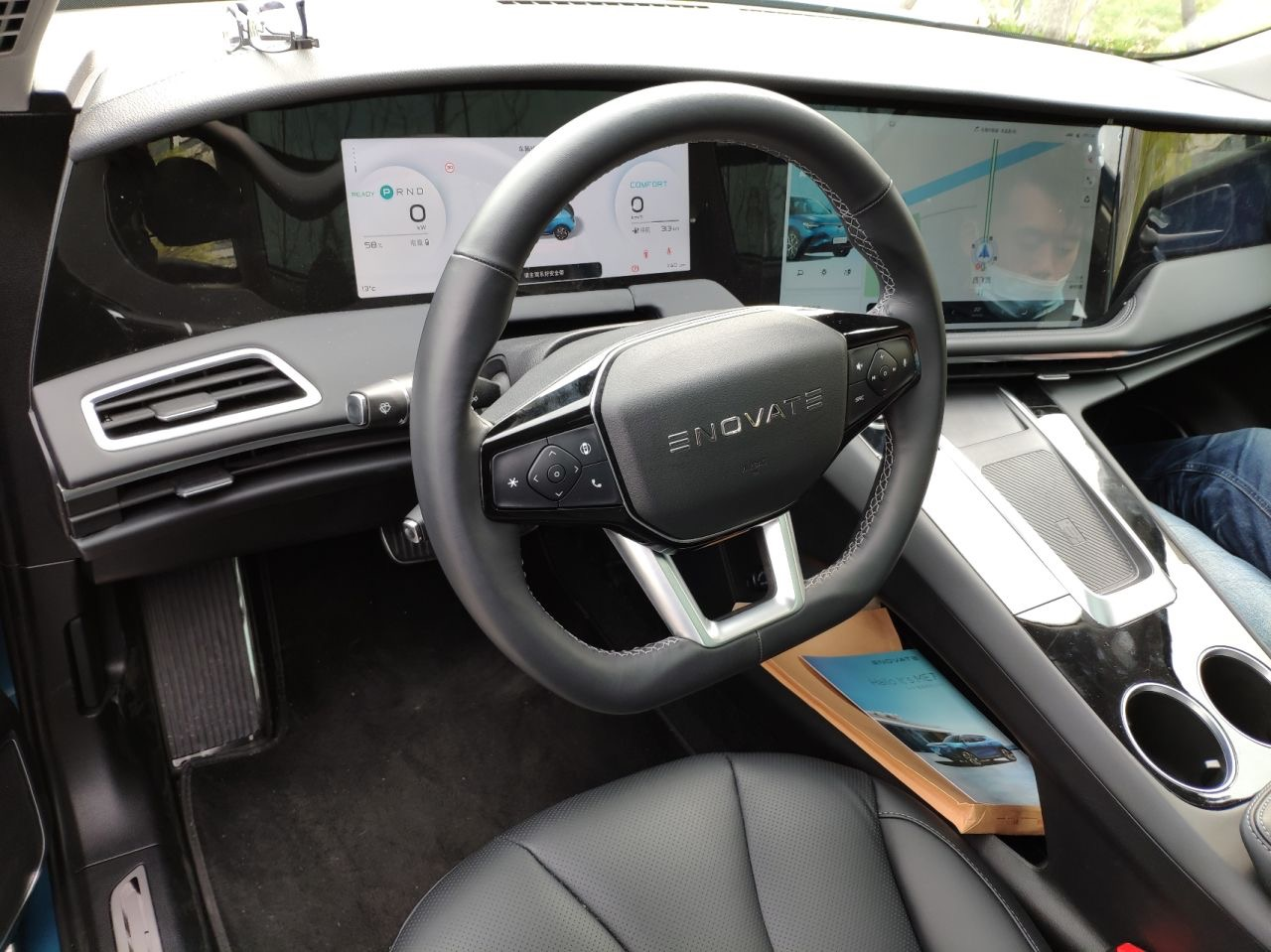
Interior

== Specifications ==
The Enovate ME7 is powered by a permanent magnet synchronous motor supplied by Bosch with the maximum power of 170 kW. The energy density of the 511 kg (1127 lbs) battery system supplied by Wanxiang Group is up to 160 Wh/kg. The NEDC range reaches 550 km (310 miles) for the long range model and the powertrain is front-wheel-drive only. The Enovate officials also claims a maximum battery range of 700 km (434 miles).

The Enovate ME7 drivetrain produces 215 hp (160 kW) and 330 N.m (243 lb.ft), with the top speed of 160 km/h (100 mph), and an acceleration time from 0 to 100 km/h in 4.9 seconds. The energy consumption of the 2019 Enovate ME7 is 15,8 kWh/100 km based on the NEDC driving cycle.

The drag coefficient of the Enovate ME7 is 0.28Cd according to officials. Enovate ME7 is equipped with 21-inch double five-spoke aluminum alloy wheels.

== Interior features ==
The Enovate ME7 is equipped with a face recognition system to provide a personalized cockpit experience for each user. The Enovate ME7 offers a total of 5 LCD displays with 3 in the front row and 2 in rear row. It also equips a panoramic sunroof, fully automatic air conditioning with 6 high-precision sensors, a 6-way front seat electric adjustment setting, and optional 9-stage adjustable front seat heating. Smart phone APP remote operation supports heating controls and wireless charging.

The luggage compartment of the ME7 crossover can accommodate 380 liters (13,4 cu.ft) of storage, and up to a total of 1310 liters (46 cu.ft storage) with seats folded down.

== Autonomous system ==
The Enovate ME7 is equipped with the L2.5 autonomous pilot system. Officials claims that there are 22 visual and radar wave sensors on the ME7, and it can achieve autonomous cruising at speeds up to 150 km/h. The L2.5 autonomous pilot system consists of three technologies including the ACC (Adaptive Cruise Control), ICA (Intelligent Cruise Assistance), and TJA (Traffic Jam Assistance). Additionally, APA (Automatic Parking Assistance) with parking radar is also available. The APA system automatically detects and identifies parking spaces that can be parked and detects potential obstacles in the environment while calculating parking trajectories and automatically parks the vehicle. Parallel parking and exiting, vertical parking, and angle parking are all supported.

== See also ==
- List of production battery electric vehicles
