= Enovate (marque) =

Chinese automobile manufacturing company

Zhejiang Dianka Automobile Technology Co. Ltd.(浙江电咖汽车科技有限公司)
- Type: Private
- Industry: Automotive
- Founded: June 23, 2015
- Founder: Hailiang Zhang
- Defunct: 2024
- Headquarters: Zhejiang, China
- Area served: China
- Key people: Hailiang Zhang (CEO and Chairman)
- Products: Automobiles
- Divisions: Dearcc
- Website: www.enovatemotors.com

Zhejiang Dianka Automobile Technology Co. Ltd., trading as Enovate or originally Dearcc, is an automobile manufacturing company headquartered in Zhejiang, China, specialising in producing electric cars. Founded on June 23, 2015, the company launched two models called the Dearcc EV10 and Enovate ME7 with an all-electric range of up to 155 km (96 mi).

== History ==
=== Dearcc ===
In mid-2015, local entrepreneur Hailiang Zhang founded Zhejiang Dianka Automobile Technology Co. in Shaoxing in the Zhejiang province of China. Ltd., which aimed to develop a range of electric cars. In November 2017, the manufacturer unveiled its first vehicle, the Dearcc EV10 city car. Production of the vehicle at the production plant in Shaoxing for the domestic Chinese market began in April 2017. In May 2018, Dearcc delivered the first 1,000 units of EV10 to customers, however, ending production after less than a year of market presence due to the decision to change the business profile and the company name itself.

=== Enovate ===
In November 2018, Dearcc radically changed its current tactics, announcing a name change to Enovate Motors and redirecting the development of its portfolio from cheap electric cars to technically advanced, compact electric SUVs. A month later, the first model after a comprehensive rebrand was presented in the form of Enovate ME7, which went on sale on the Chinese market in May 2019. In the same year, the company presented a study of the Enovate ME-S luxury electric sedan, and in July 2021, the model range was expanded by another production model - a smaller SUV Enovate ME5. In December 2022, Enovate announced plans to build its first car factory outside its native China, signing an agreement with investors from Saudi Arabia. This was to open the way to future, potential expansion into foreign markets, especially the European one.

In April 2023, Enovate's financial situation collapsed, following the closure of existing showrooms in Chinese shopping malls and cuts in employee salaries at the end of 2022. The company ended production of both models, closed its factory in Changsha and started looking for new financing. The company did not obtain it for another year, and at the beginning of 2024 its assets were frozen as part of pre-bankruptcy proceedings.

== Models and products ==
- Dearcc EV10
- Enovate ME5
- Enovate ME7
- Enovate ME-S
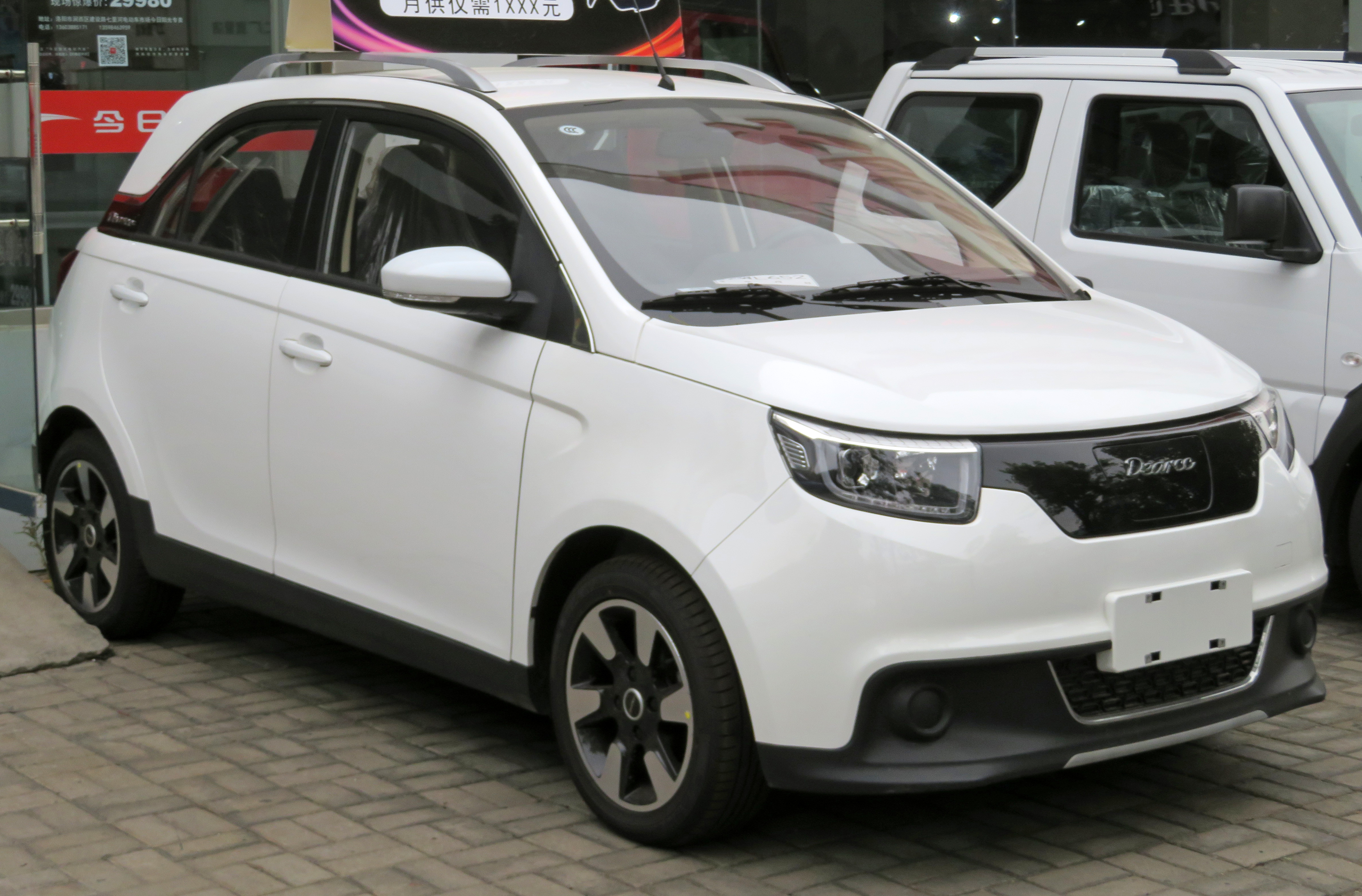
Dearcc EV10

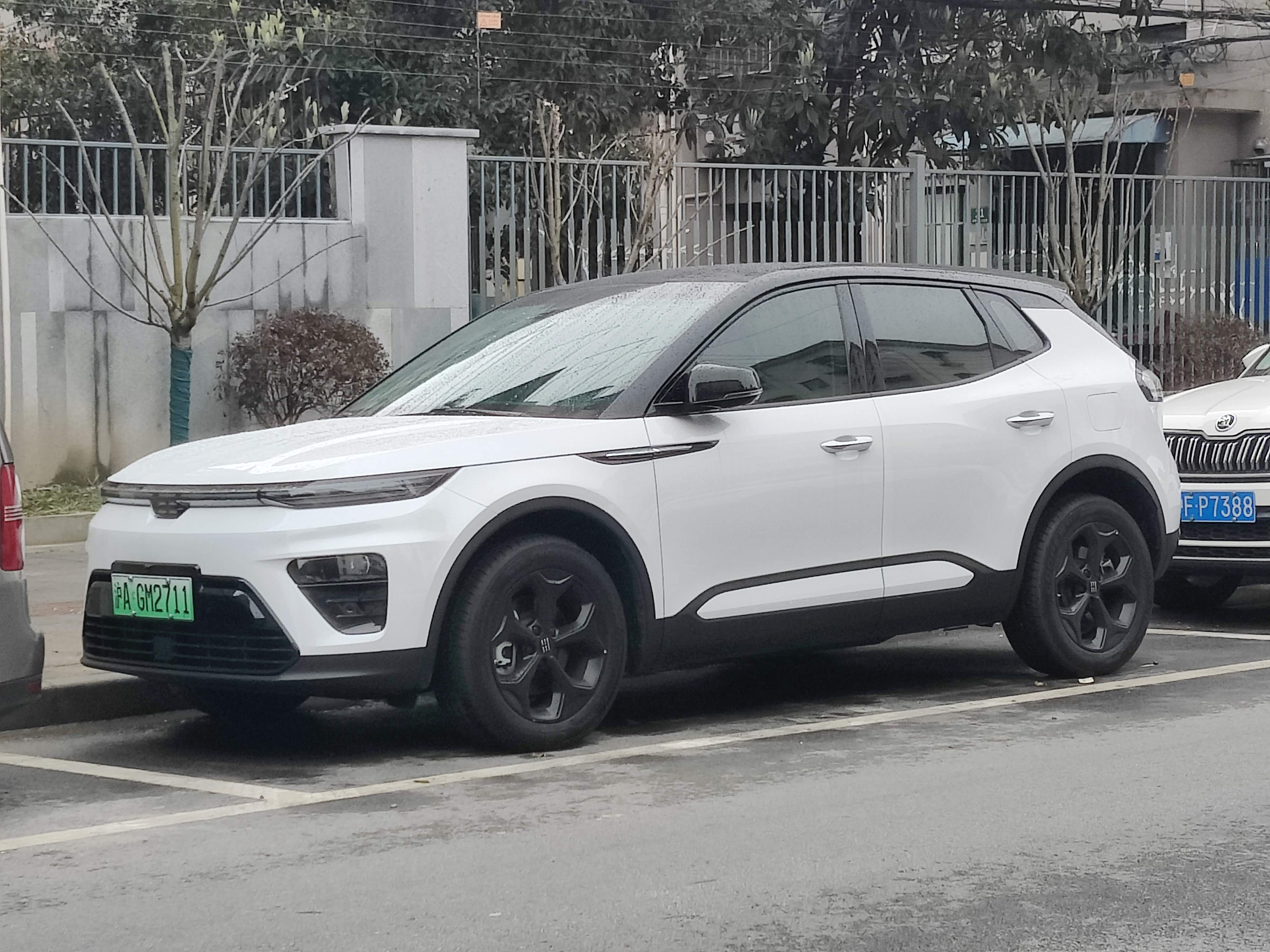
Enovate ME5

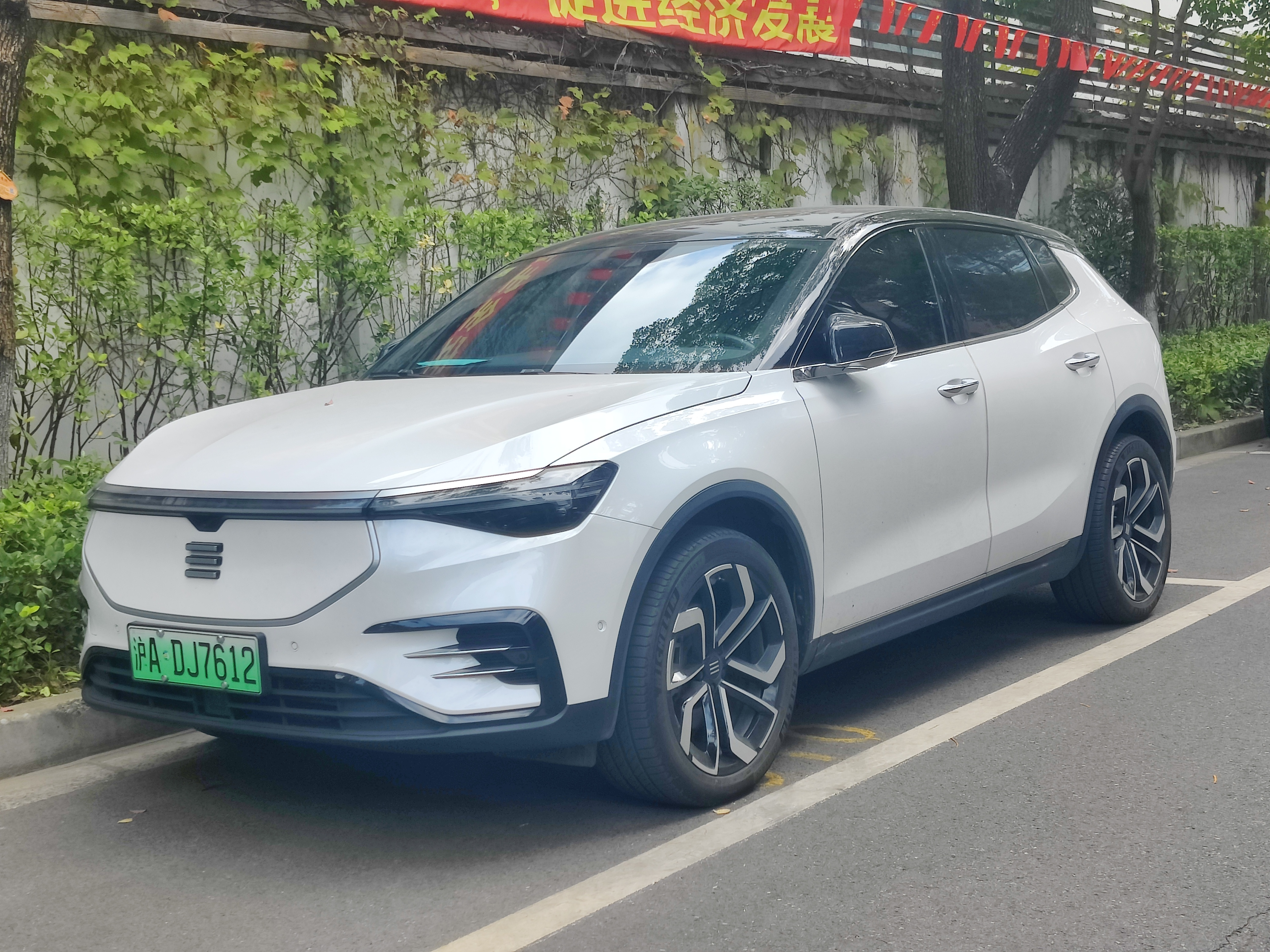
Enovate ME7

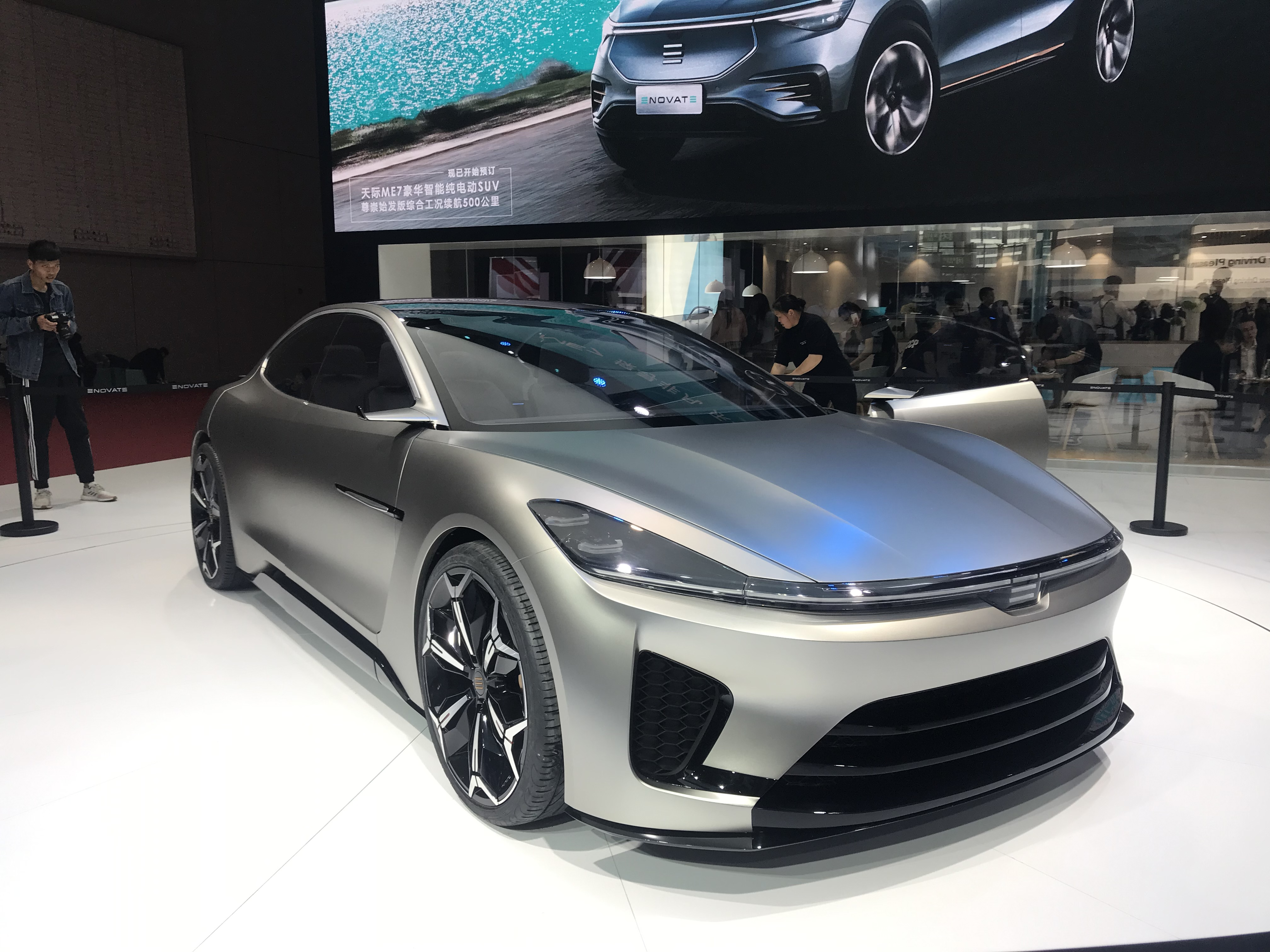
Enovate ME-S
