= Fujian Motors Group =

Electric vehicle manufacturers of China

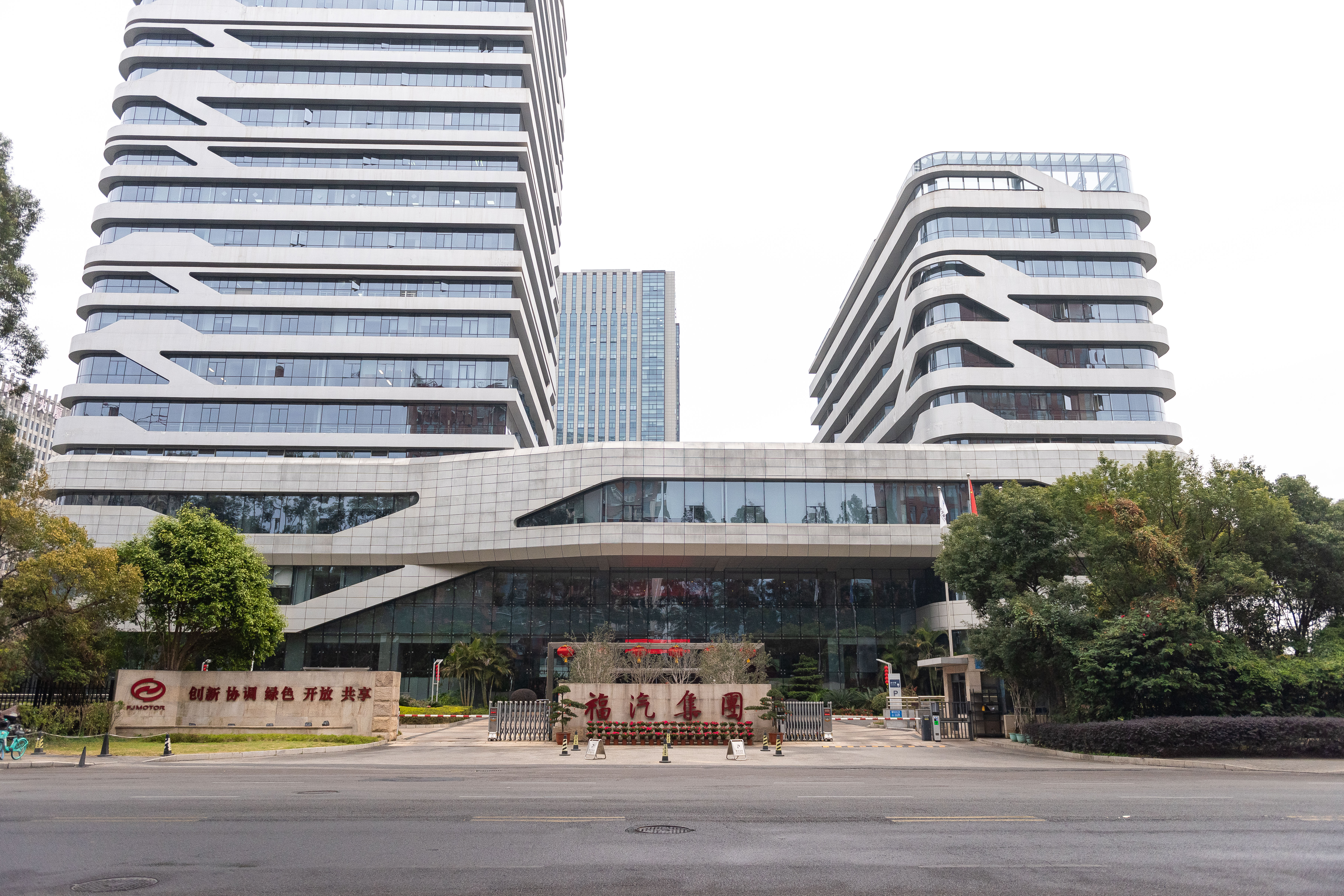
- The headquarters of Fujian Motors is located in Fuzhou High-tech Industrial Development Zone
- Native name: 福汽集团
- Type: State-owned enterprises
- Founded: 1992; 34 years ago
- Headquarters: Fujian Province, China
- Key people: Huang Yu (General Manager)
- Parent: State-owned Assets Supervision and Administration Commission of Fujian Provincial People's Government
- Divisions: Fujian Benz (50%); King Long (13%); Higer Bus
- Website: http://www.fjmotor.com.cn/

The Fujian Motors Group , referred to as Fujian Automobile Group or FJMG, is a wholly state-owned company in Fujian Province. It was established in 1991. It is a large state-owned enterprise in Fujian Province and the largest automobile group company in Fujian Province. The address is located at Fuzhou Hi-Tech Zone Haixi Park Hi-Tech Avenue.

Group companies include Fujian Benz (50% joint venture with Daimler AG), King Long (a bus manufacturer) (15%) and Higer Bus.

Fujian Daimler, a subsidiary of the group, will sell no less than 40% of its shares to BAIC, while the group itself and Soueast Auto will maintain the current situation and will not enter into new joint ventures.

In 2012, Fujian Automobile Industry Group had an operating income of 10.26 billion yuan, of which Southeast Automobile accounted for 7.261 billion yuan, On May 16, 2013, the People's Government of Fujian Province and Dongfeng Motor Corporation signed a strategic cooperation framework agreement, Dongfeng Motor Corporation will acquire 45% of the equity of Fujian Automobile Industry Group Co., Ltd. held by the State-owned Assets Supervision and Administration Commission of Fujian Province through capital increase, At the same time, Dongfeng Motor Corporation and FAW Group will also establish an investment company to control Southeast (Fujian) Automotive Industry Co., Ltd.

== Brands ==
=== King Long ===
King Long United Automotive Industry Co., Ltd (Chinese: 厦门金龙联合汽车工业有限公司) or commonly known as King Long (simplified Chinese: 金龙; traditional Chinese: 金龍; pinyin: Jīnlóng, literally, Golden Dragon) is a Chinese bus manufacturer headquartered in Xiamen, Fujian. Founded in December 1988, it is focused mainly on developing, manufacturing and selling large-and-medium-sized coaches and light vans. In 2008, King Long had an 18 percent share of the export market in China. Overseas sales contributed 25 percent of King Long's sales.

King Long vehicles

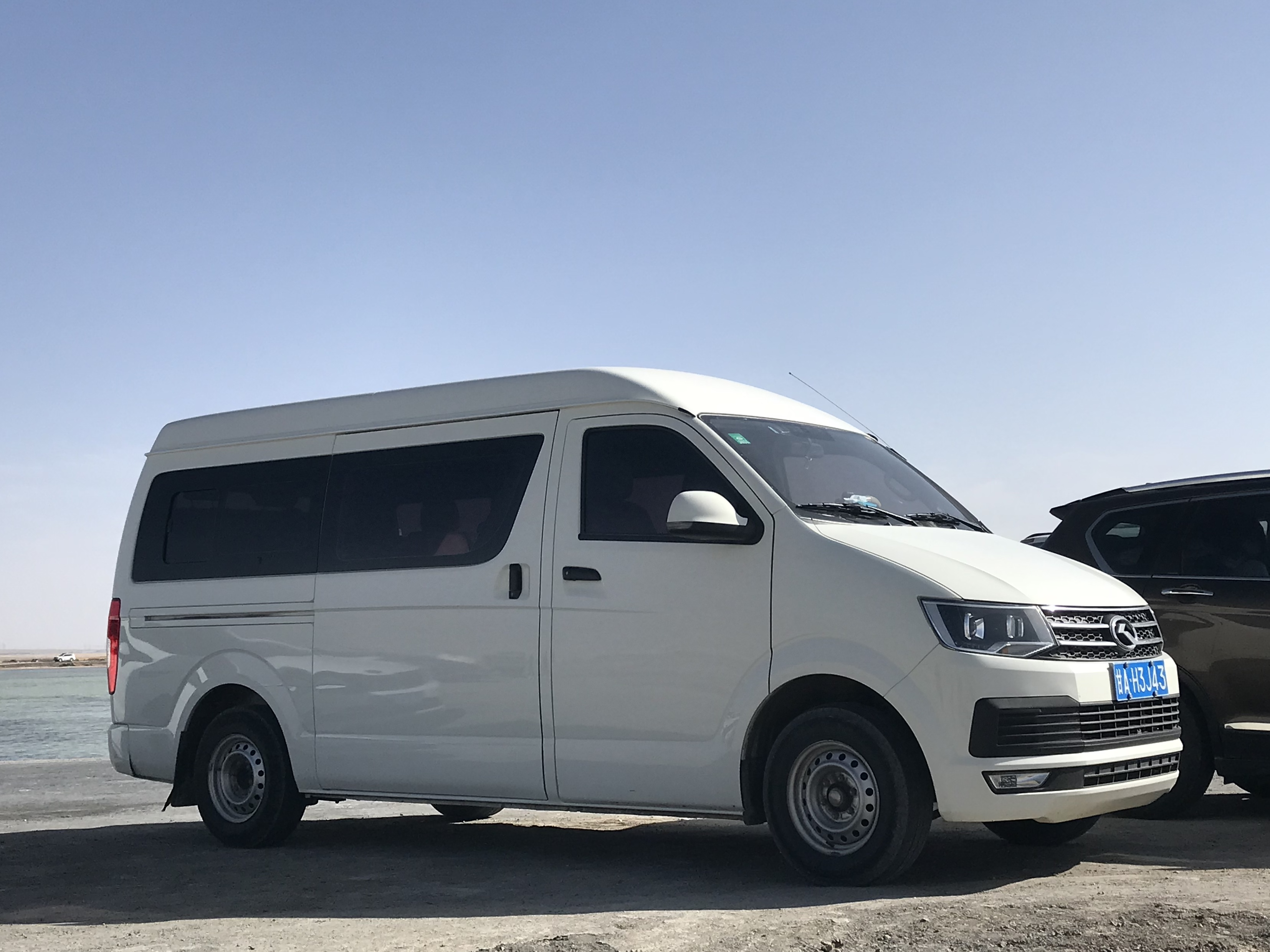
Kairui

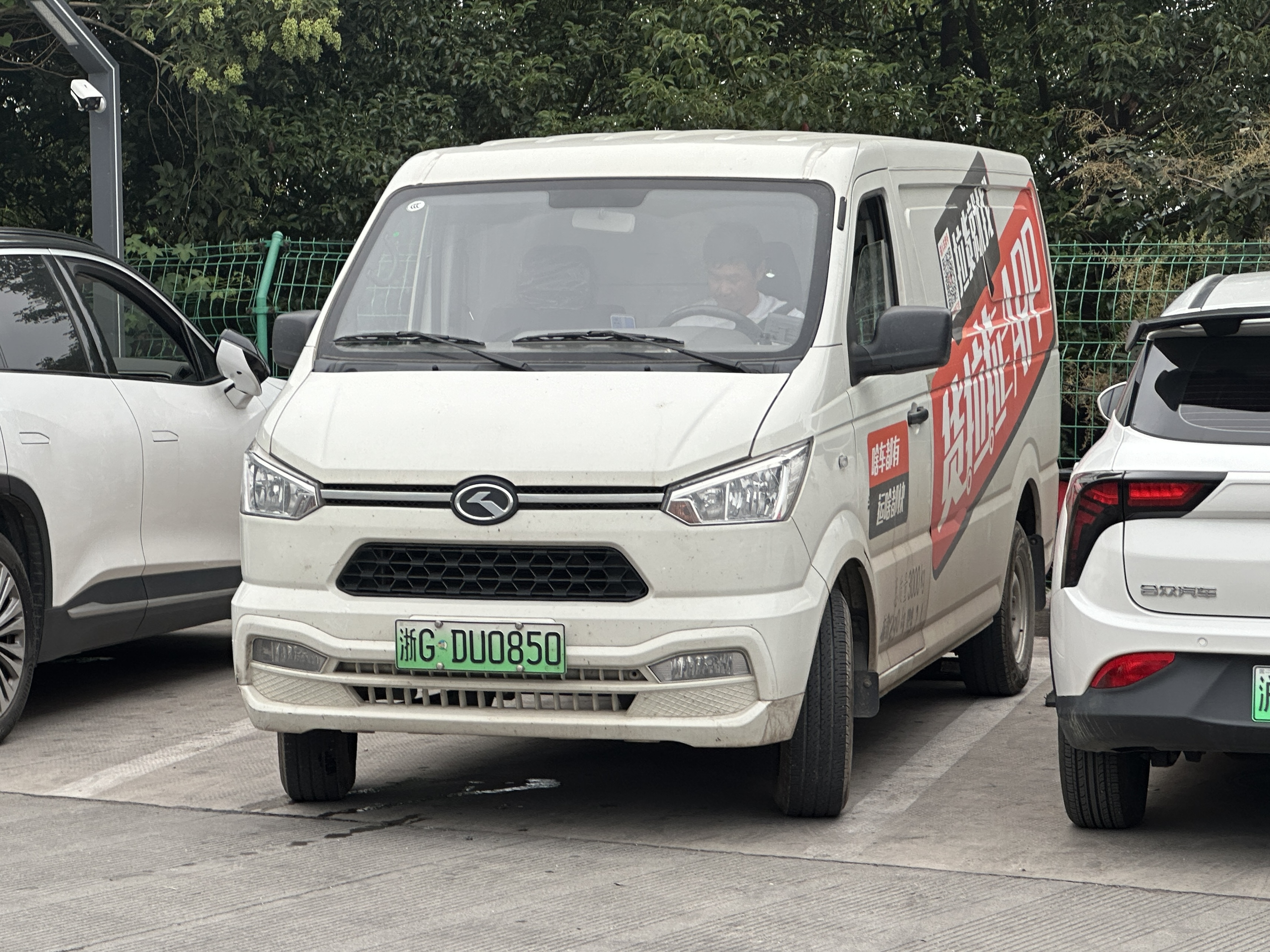
Longyao 6

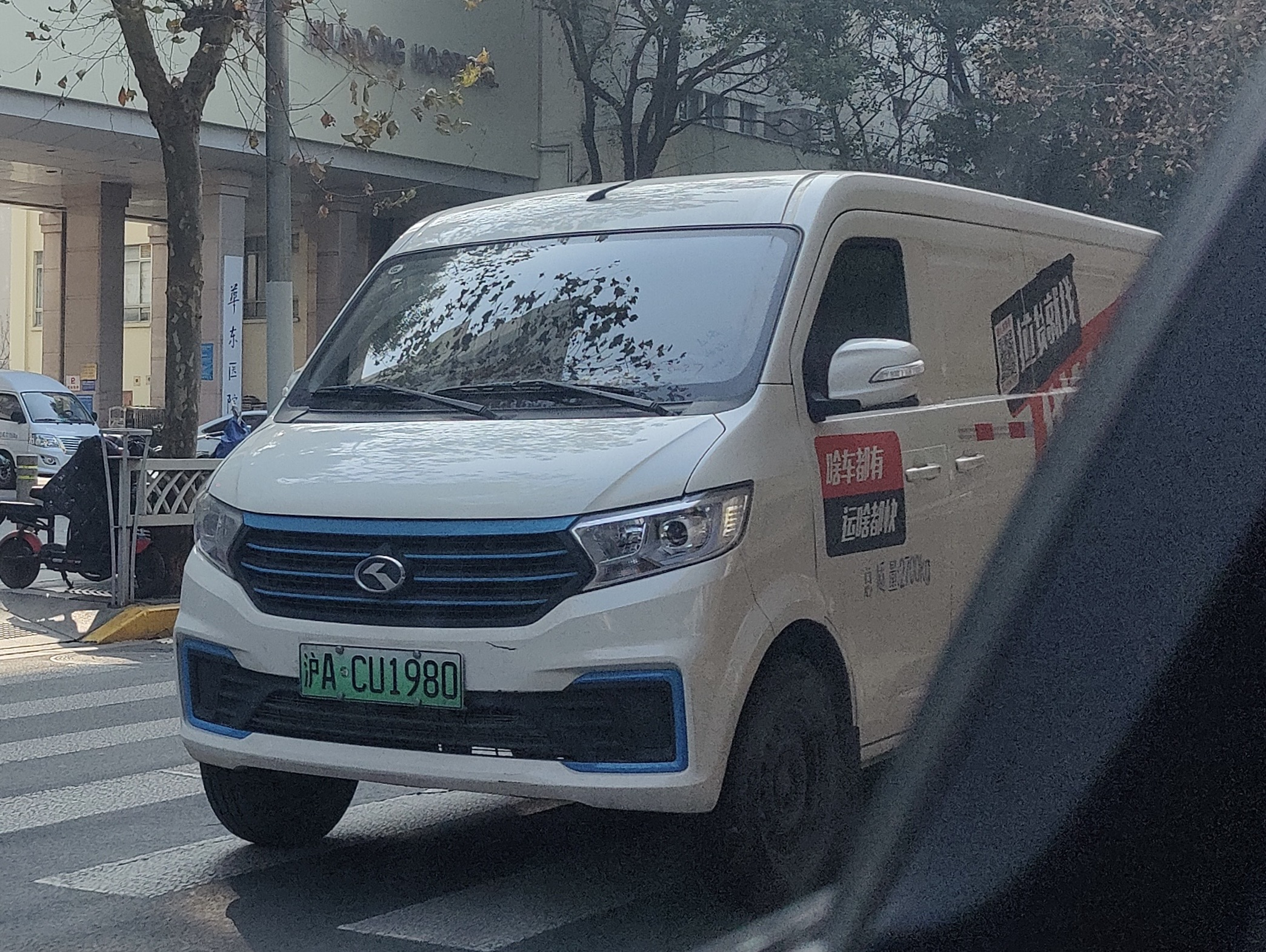
Longyao 6S

=== Higer ===
Higer Bus Company Limited, also known as Higer Bus, is a Chinese bus manufacturer based in Suzhou, Jiangsu province. It was established at the end of 1998. HIGER is China's leading exporter of buses and coaches.

Higer vehicles

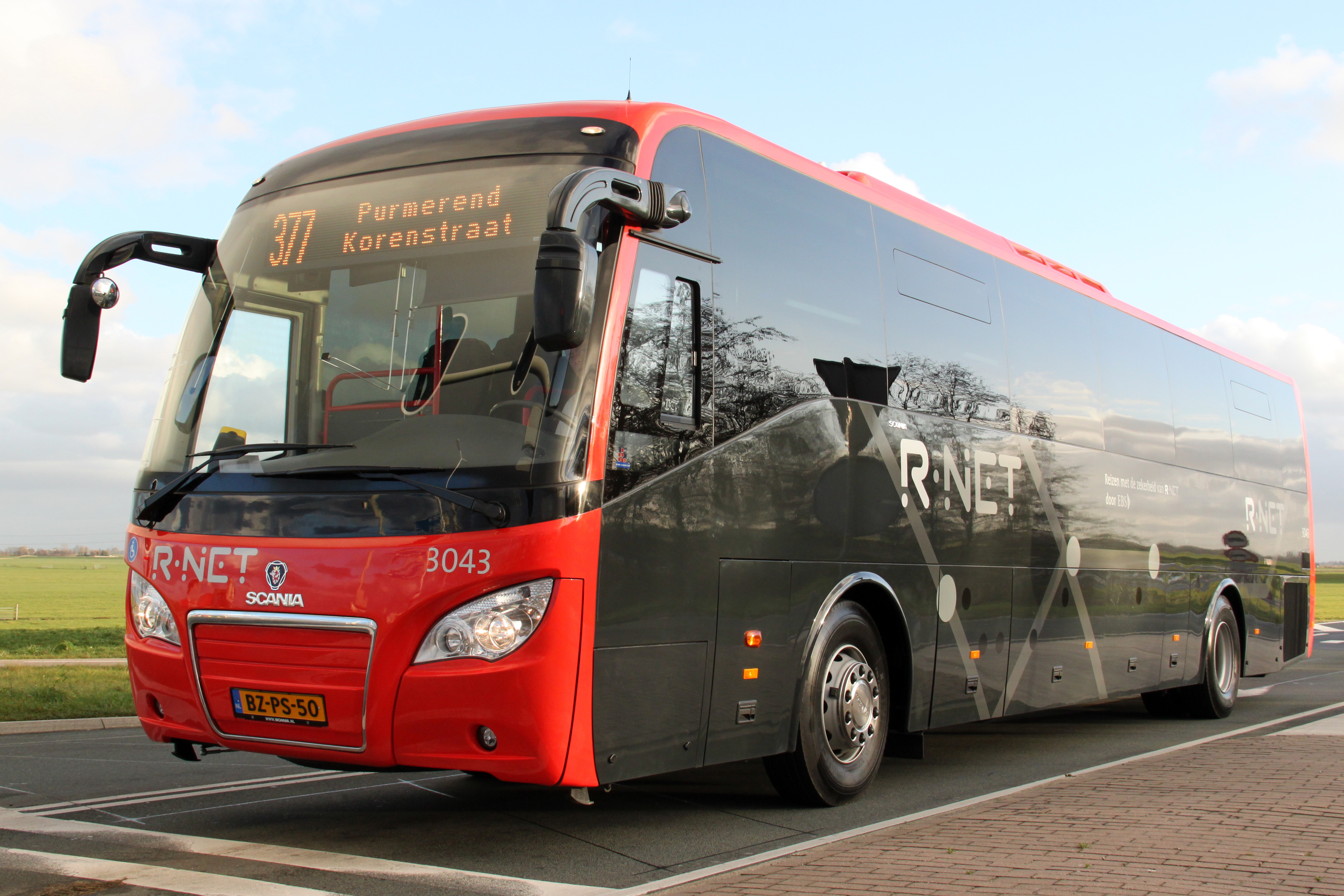
A30 R

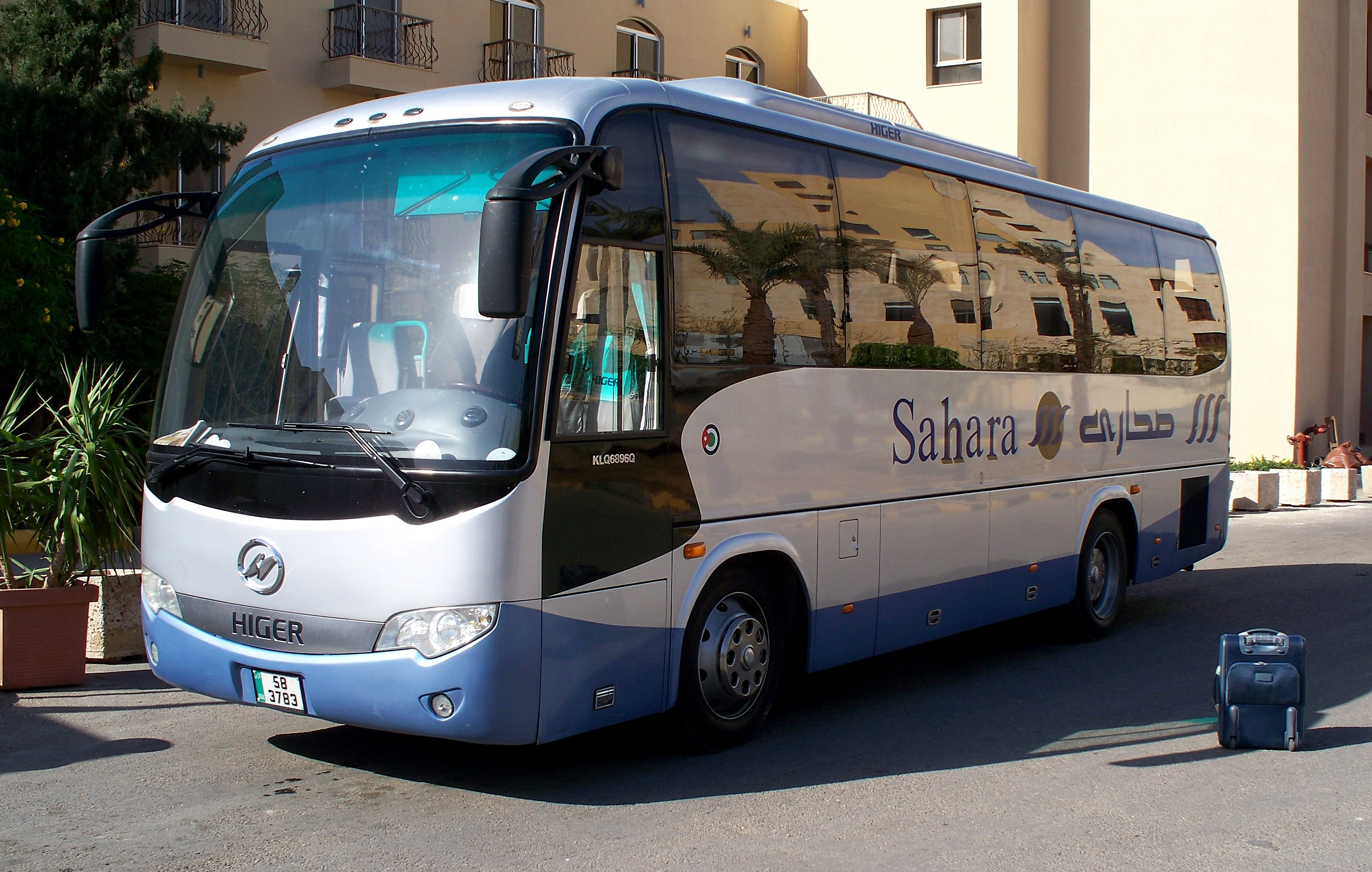
KLQ 6896Q

=== Keyton ===
Keyton also known as Fujian New Longma (NLM) or Fujian Qiteng (FQT) is a brand for MPVs, minivans and vans. It is sold overseas in several developing countries, including Egypt, Philippines, Bolivia, and Chile.

In May 2016, the company NEVS announced that they will take over the Chinese company New Longma (NLM) after acquiring 50% of the New Longma manufacturing plant. On May 12, 2016, the formal contract was signed in Fujian. On 18 August 2016, NEVS officially took over Chinese vehicle company New Longma (NLM) in the Fujian province. At the same time, NLM signed the first contract with Panda New Energy on delivering 35,000 electric logistics delivery vans.

- Keyton V60
- Keyton EX80
- Keyton M70
Keyton vehicles

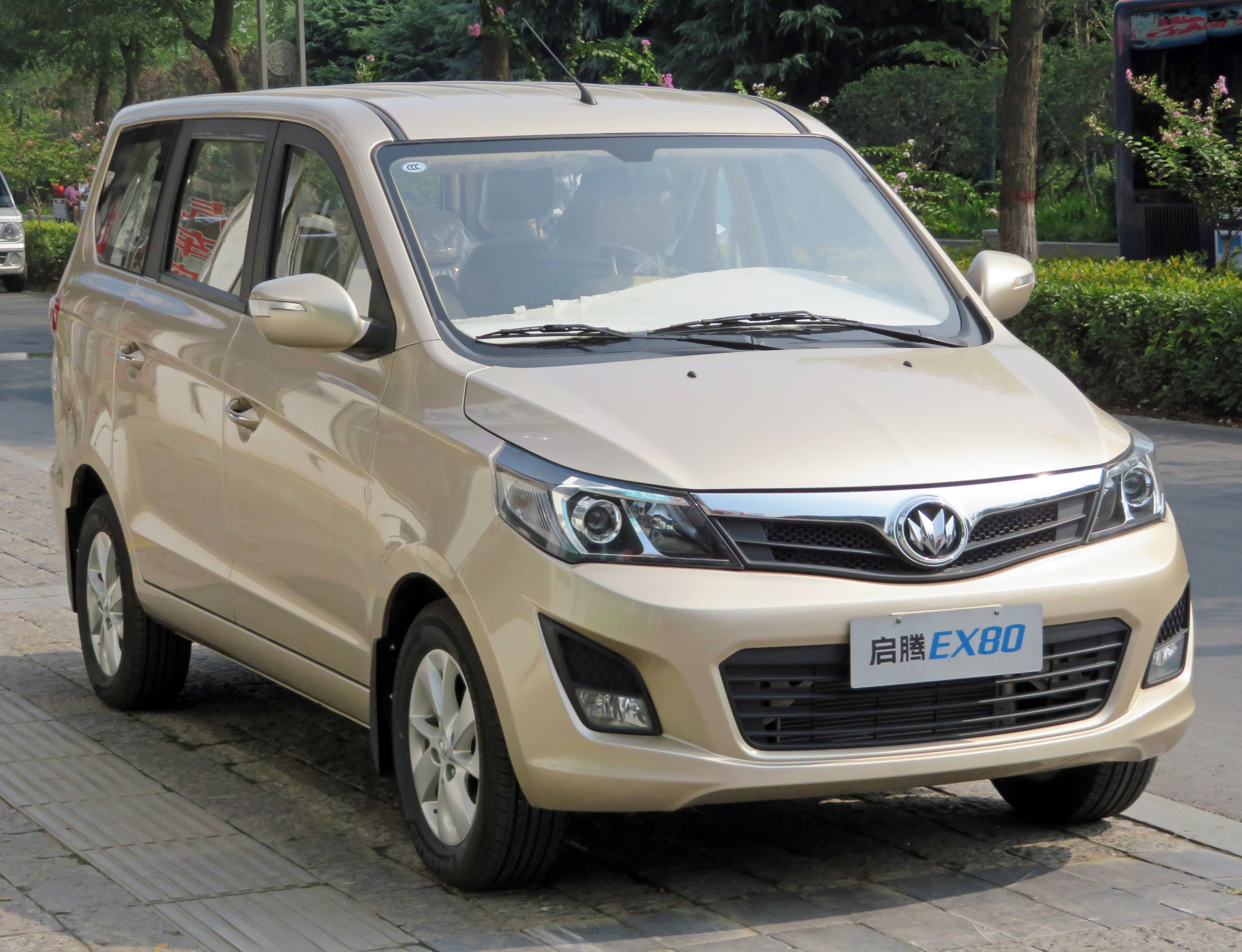
EX80

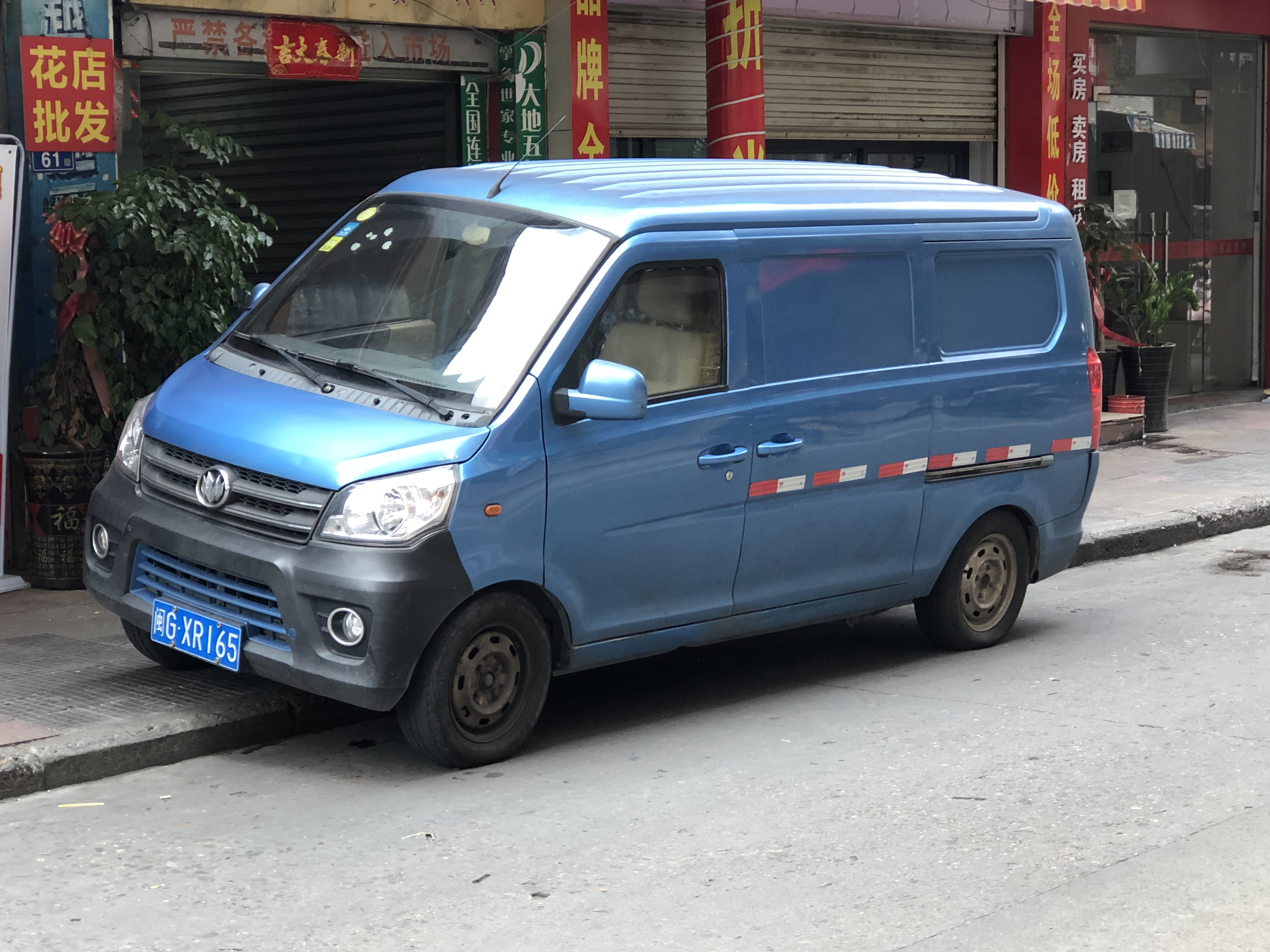
M70

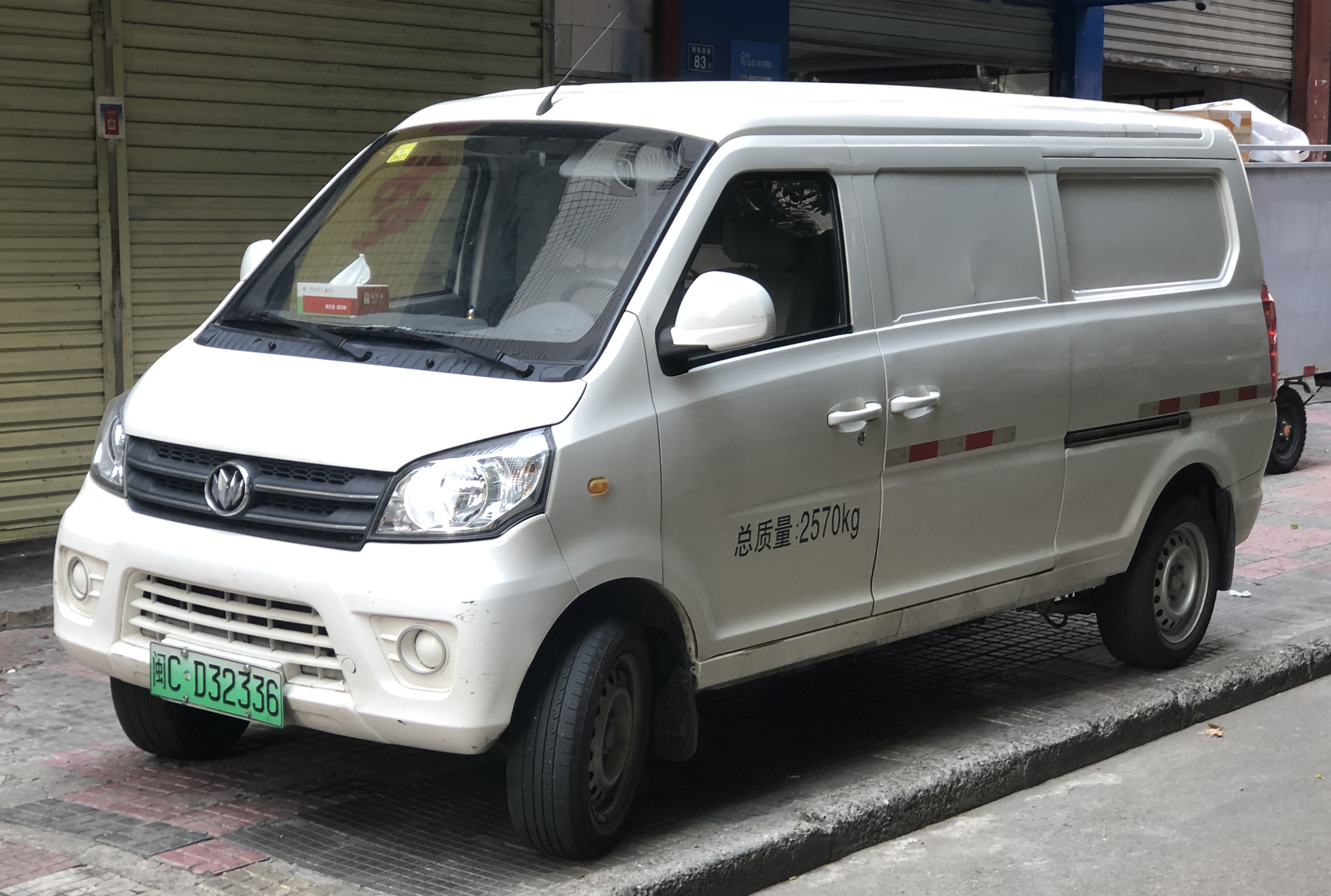
M70L

== Joint venture brand ==
=== Fujian Benz ===
Fujian Benz Automotive Co., Ltd., formerly Fujian Daimler Automotive Co., Ltd., is a light commercial vehicle manufacturing company based in Fúzhōu, and a joint venture between the German Daimler AG, the Chinese state-owned Fujian Motors Group and the Taiwanese China Motor Corporation. Series production of Fujian Daimler's first product range, the Viano transporter, began in April 2010.

Fujian Benz vehicles

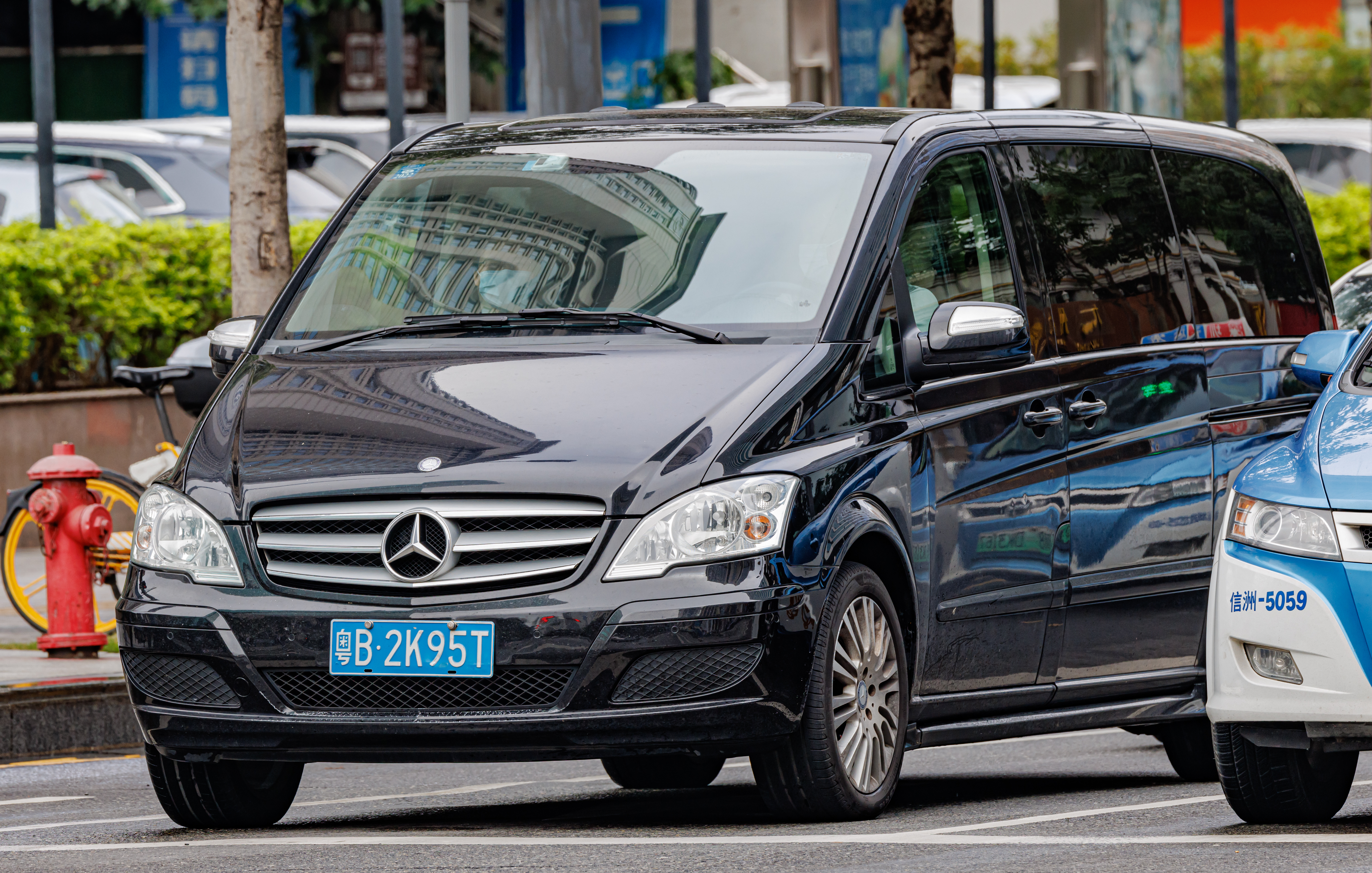
Viano

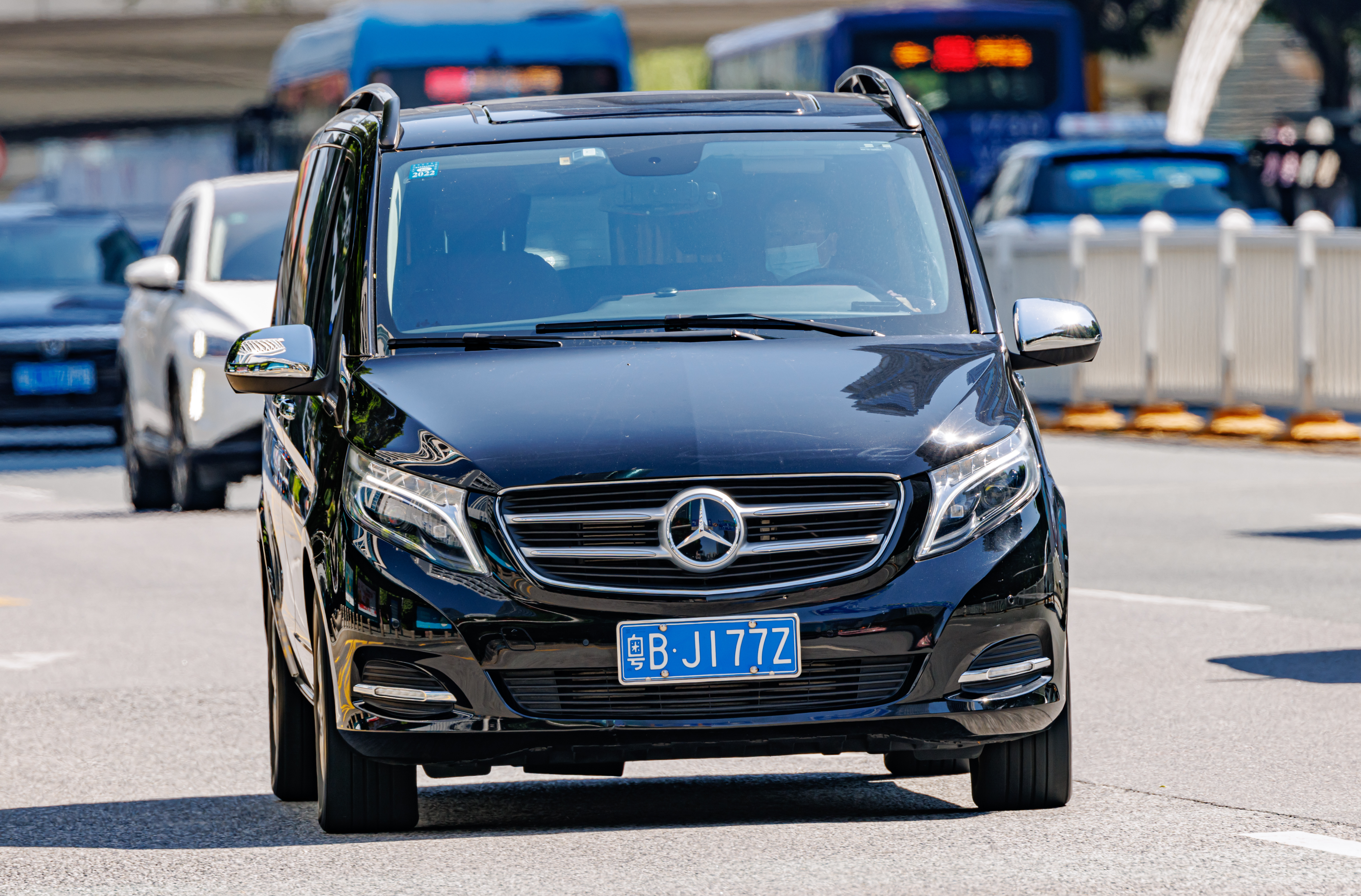
V-Class

== Former brand ==
=== Soueast Motors ===
South East (Fujian) Motor Co., Ltd., trading as Soueast, is a Chinese automobile manufacturer based in Fuzhou, Fujian, and a joint venture between China Motor Corporation (25%), Fujian Motor Industry Group (50%) and Mitsubishi Motors (25%). Its principal activity is the design, development, production and sale of passenger cars and minibuses sold under the Soueast marque. It also manufactures Mitsubishi brand passenger cars for sale in mainland China.

Southeast has been acquired by Chery in 2024 and is currently producing Jetour brand vehicle.

Soueast Motors vehicles

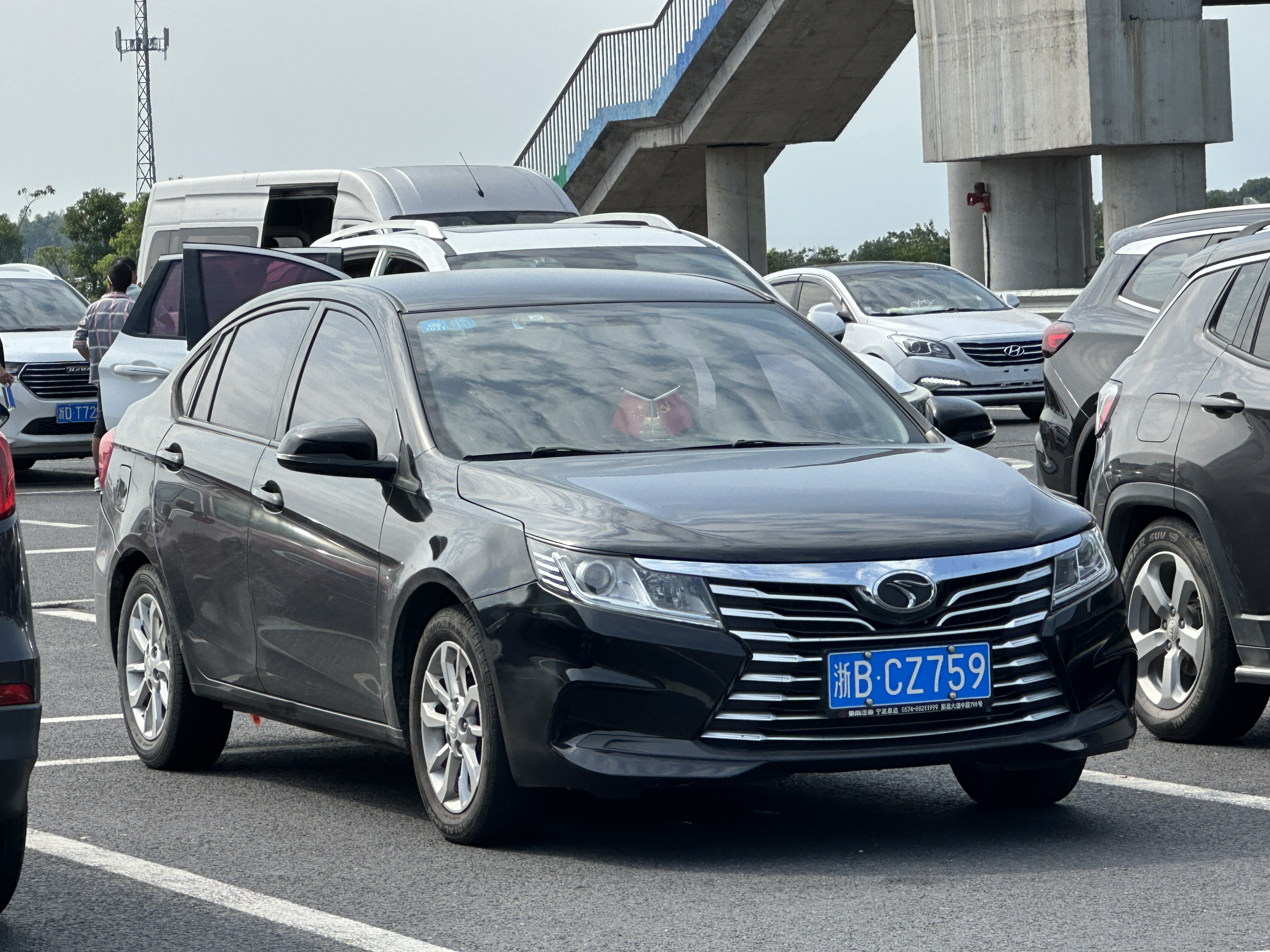
A5 Yiwu

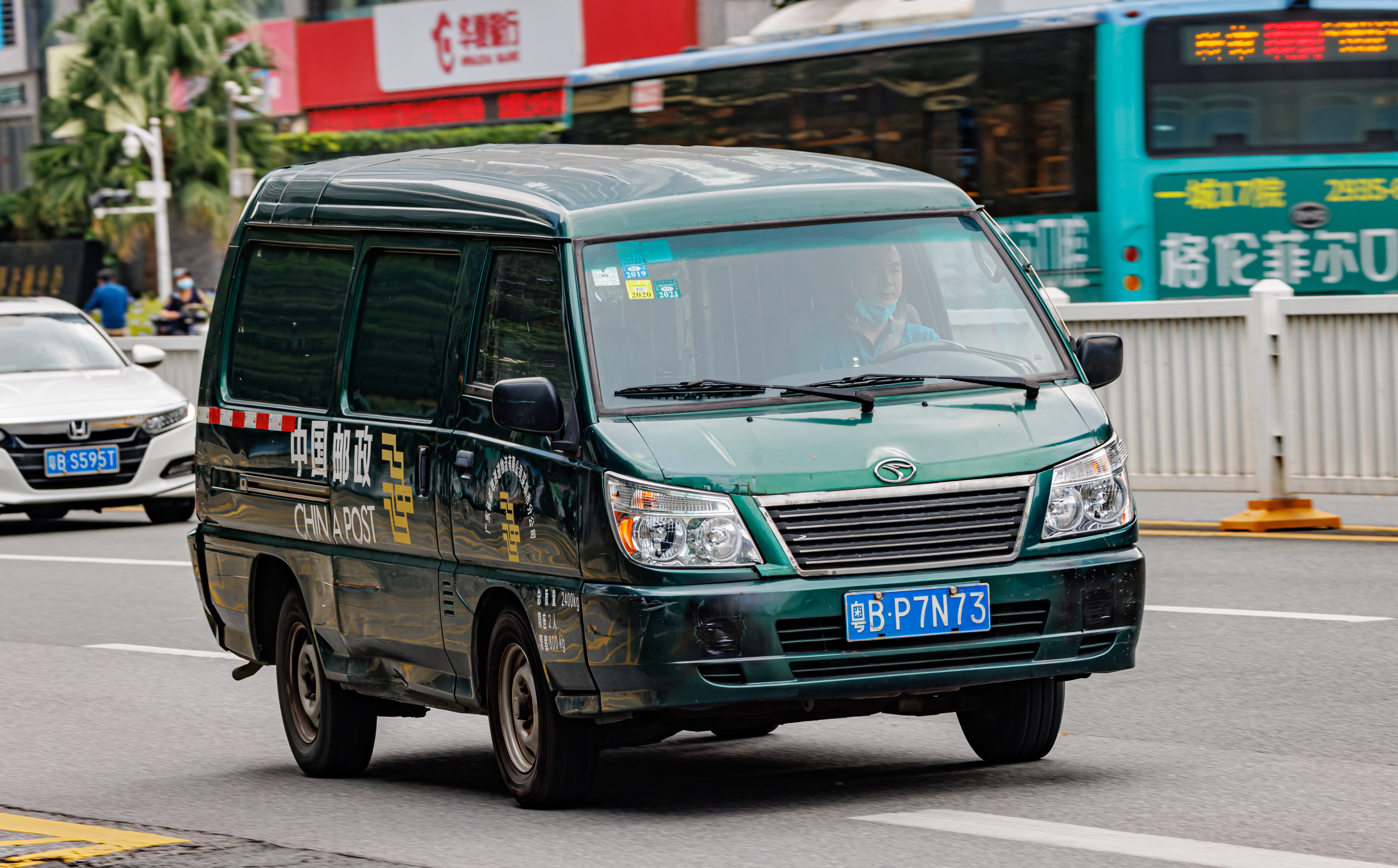
Delica

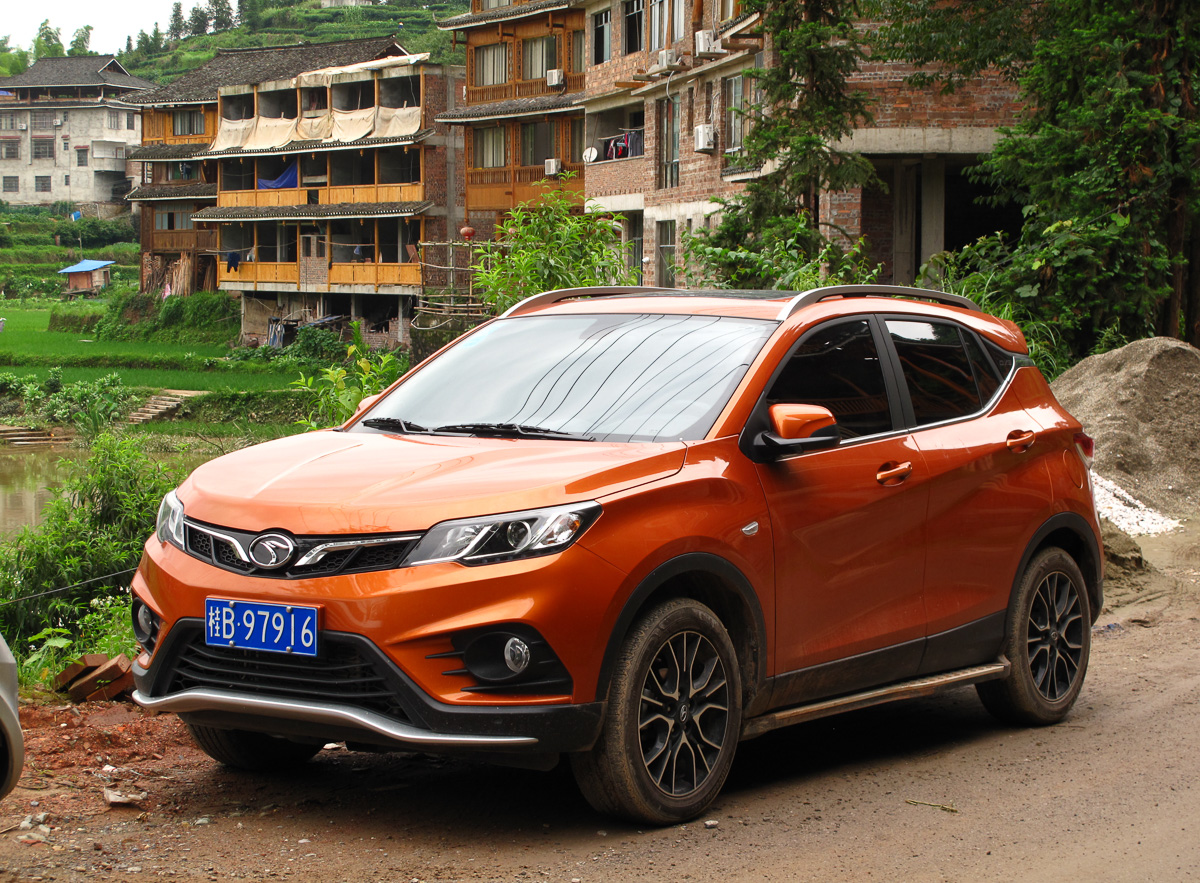
DX3

=== Yudo Auto ===
Founded on December 4, 2015 in Putian, Fujian, Yudo Auto (云度) is a new energy vehicle brand with main shareholders are state-owned companies and the local government of Putian, in Fujian Province. Fujian Motors Group has divested from Yudo Auto in 2020.

- Yudo π1, electric subcompact crossover inspired by the Haval H1
- Yudo π3, electric subcompact crossover
Yudo Auto vehicles

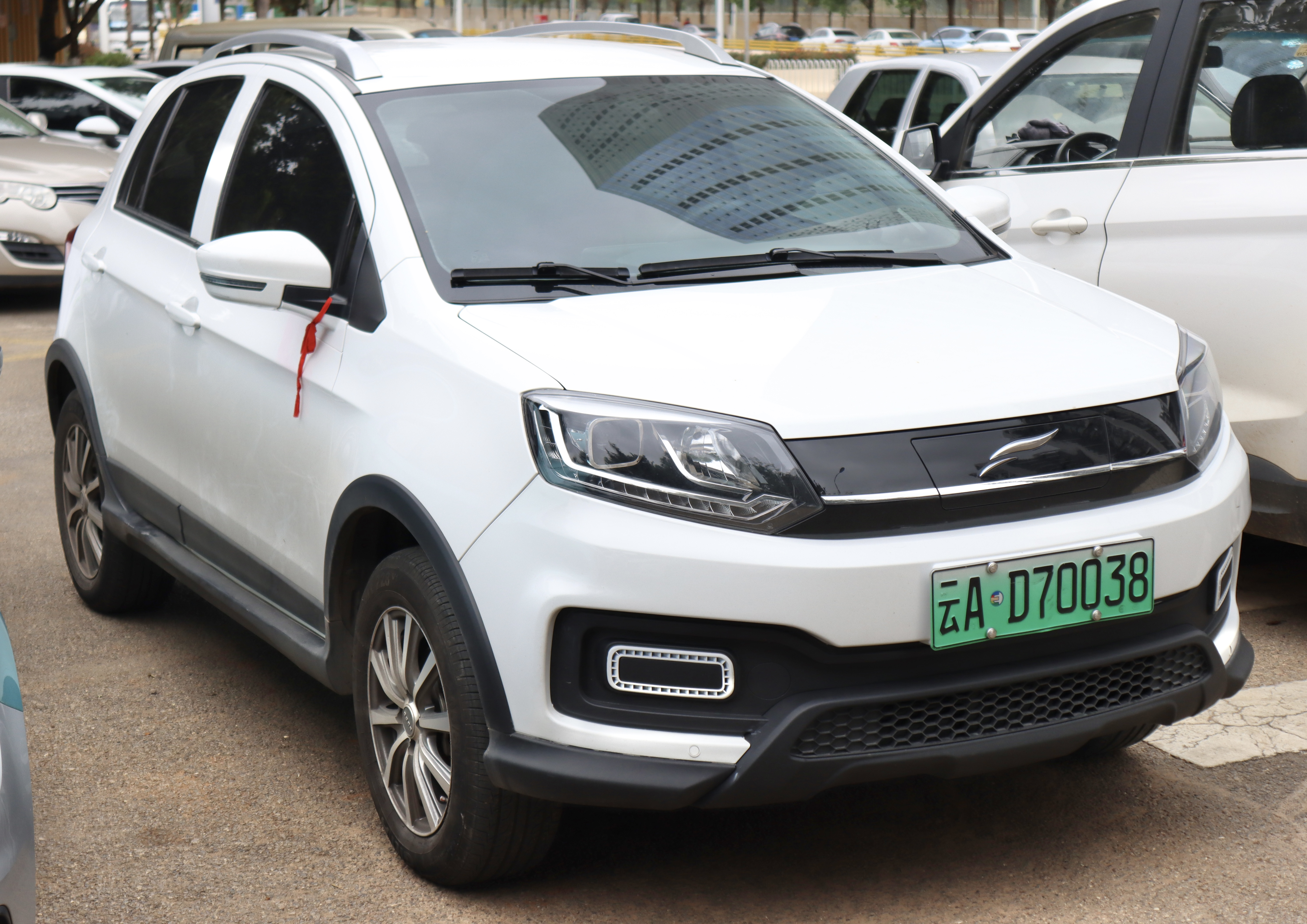
π1

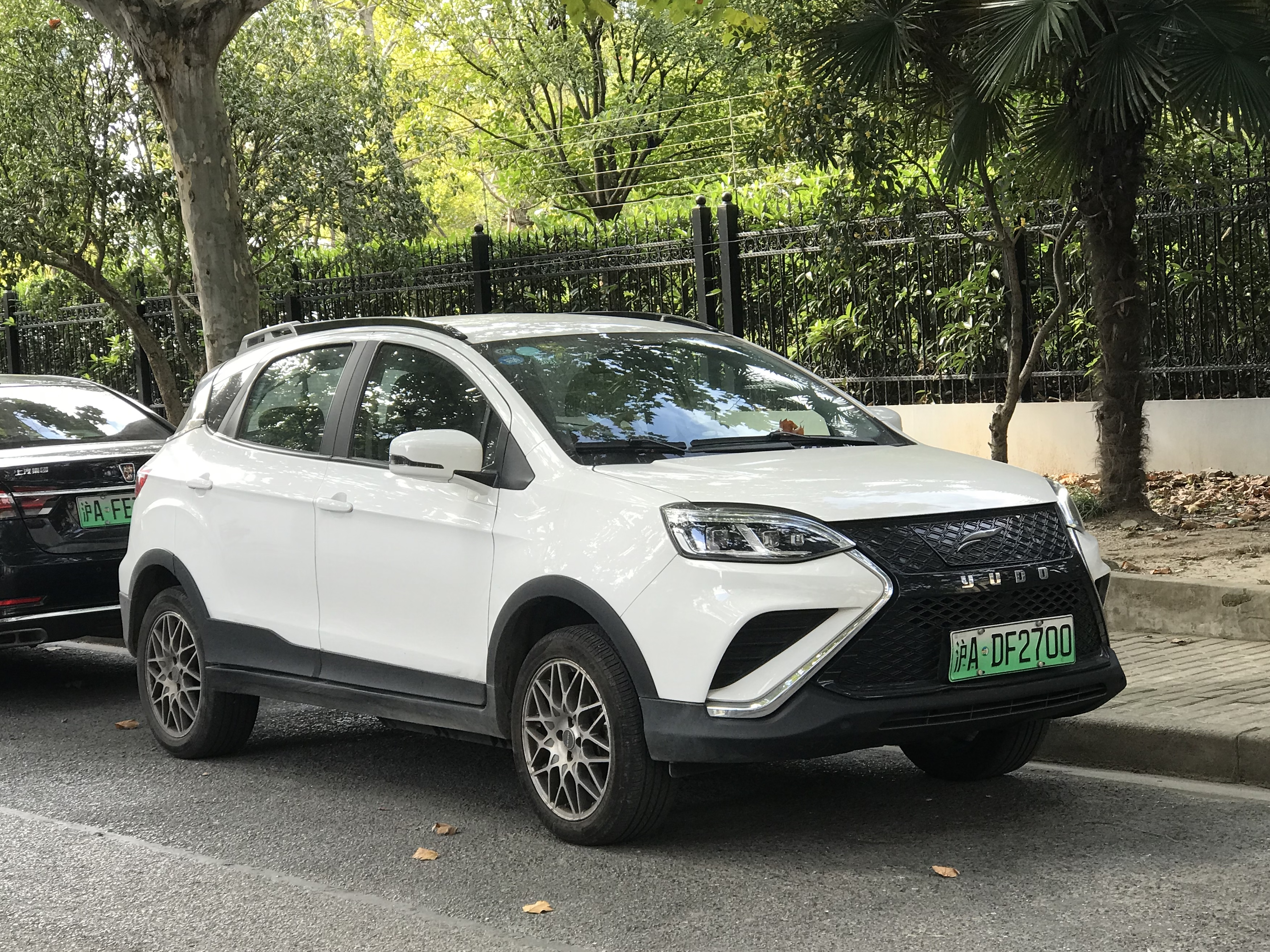
π3
