= Yudo Auto =

Chinese automotive manufacturer

- Product type: Automotive marque
- Current owner: Juneyao Group
- Country: China
- Introduced: 2015; 11 years ago
- Markets: China
- Previous owners: Fujian Motors Group (2017-2022)
- Website: www.yudoauto.com

Yudo Auto is a Chinese electric vehicle marque established in 2015. It was owned by Fujian Motors Group from 2017 to 2022, and since by Juneyao Group.

== History ==
In December 2015, on the initiative of the Chinese automotive concern Fujian Motors Group and the provincial authorities of Fujian, a new company, Yudo Auto, was established, the aim of which was to enter the car class which is rapidly developing in China. The official presentation of the first two production Yudo vehicles took place in February 2017, both of which took the form of small, subcompact crossovers with distinctive names. The manufacturer used the letter π from the Greek alphabet, calling the smaller model π1 and the larger one - π3. Two months later, in April 2017, the company presented its first study vehicle, the X-Pi. In 2018, a line of prototypes was presented, heralding the urban hatchback and the compact SUV, but ultimately neither Yudo ππ nor Yudo π7 went into mass production and did not go beyond the studio phase.

Yudo Auto did not achieve market success—during the first full market presence in China, 7,343 units of both models of the branch were sold, while a year later, in 2019, there was an over 65% decline in nationwide sales with 2,566 vehicles sold. In 2020, the company planned to expand its range with the V01L electric delivery vehicle based on Keyton M70 of the sister company Fujian Motors, but the vehicle did not go into mass production. At the beginning of 2022, Yudo stopped producing the newer and larger π3, and in February it was forced to suspend production of the π1 due to bankruptcy.

In the summer of 2022, Yudo was saved from disappearance from the market by the Chinese airline Juneyao Group. He purchased the company from the previous owner, Fujian Motors Group, and resumed production of the Yudo π1 in July this year as the company's only model for the next 2 years. In February 2023, the company presented the first new model in 4 years in the form of Yuntu, which is in fact a deeply modernized π1. This remained on sale in parallel as a cheaper model for another half a year, until in the fall of 2023 Yudo again became a company based on one product.

In December 2024, the new JY Air model was launched but under the new JuneYao Auto marque.

== Models ==
=== Production cars ===
Model	Photo	Specifications
Yuntu		Body style: 5-door SUV Class: Subcompact crossover SUV Doors: 4 Seats: 5 Battery: 31.95 or 41.7 kWh (115.0 or 150.1 MJ) Lithium ion Production: 2023–present Revealed: February 2023

=== Discontinued vehicles ===
Model	Photo	Specifications
π1		Body style: 5-door SUV Class: Subcompact crossover SUV Doors: 4 Seats: 5 Battery: 38.5 or 51 or 49.8 kWh (139 or 184 or 179 MJ) Lithium ion Production: 2018–2023 Revealed: April 2017 (Auto Shanghai)
π3		Body style: 5-door SUV Class: Subcompact crossover SUV Doors: 4 Seats: 5 Battery: 51 kWh (180 MJ) Lithium ion Production: 2018–2022 Revealed: April 2017 (Auto Shanghai)

=== Concept vehicles ===
Model	Photo	Specifications
X-π		Body style: Crossover SUV Class: (J) Subcompact Doors: 3 Seats: 4 Revealed: April 2017 (Auto Shanghai)
π7		Body style: Crossover SUV Class: (J) Compact Doors: 5 Seats: 5 Revealed: April 2018 (Auto China)
ππ		Body style: Hatchback Class: C Doors: 5 Seats: 5 Revealed: April 2018 (Auto China)
V01L		Body style: Van Class: (M) Microvan Doors: 5 Seats: 5 Revealed: 2020
