= Yudo Yuntu =

Subcompact crossover SUV

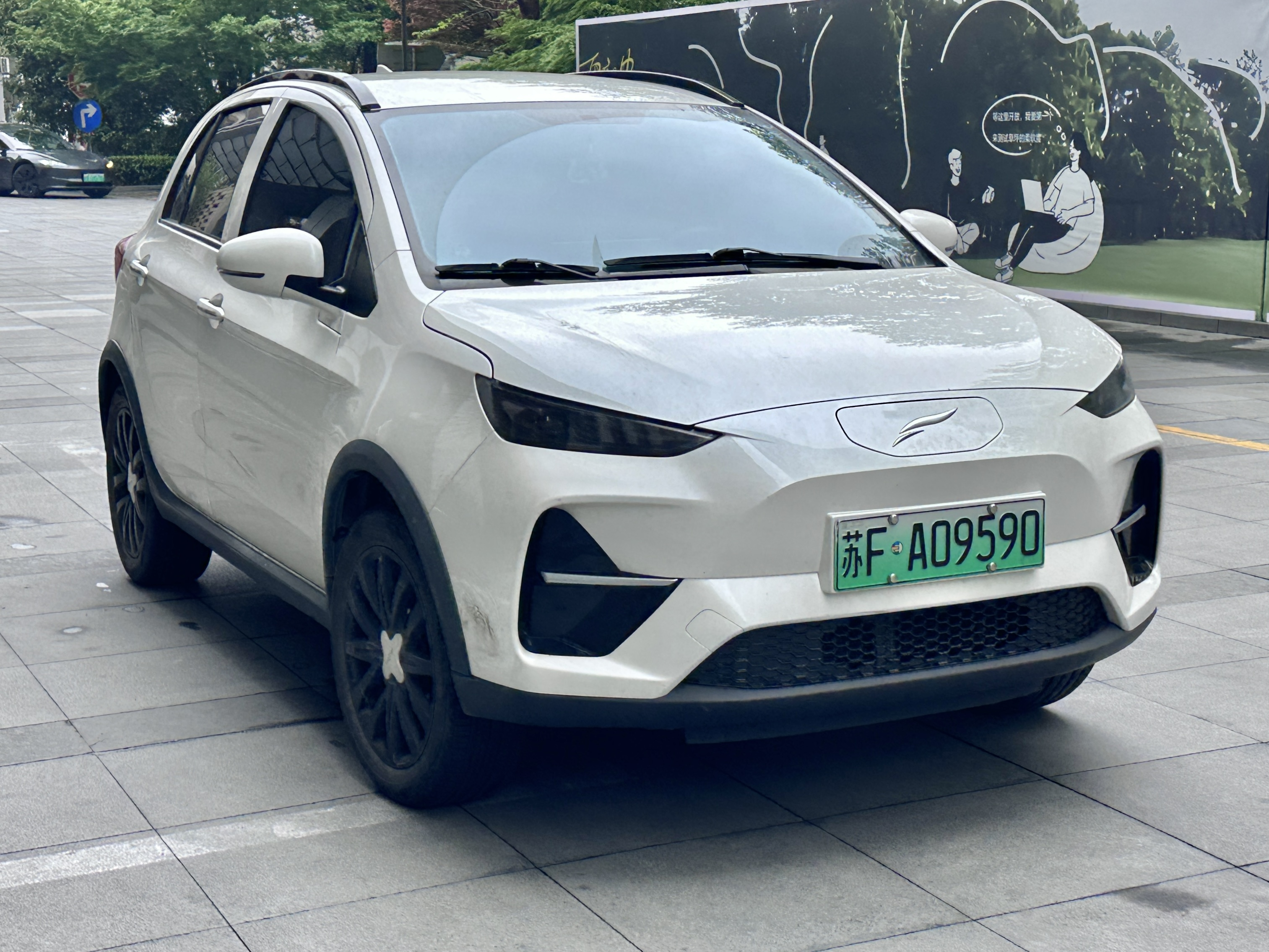

Overview
- Manufacturer: Yudo Auto
- Also called: Yudo K3 (export); Yudo 3 (Spain, Israel); Ecocar Yudo (Greece); EMC Yudo (Italy); Yooudooo 3 (Spain)
- Production: 2023–present
- Assembly: China: Putian

Body and chassis
- Class: Subcompact crossover SUV
- Body style: 5-door SUV
- Layout: Front-motor, front-wheel drive (single motor)
- Related: Yudo π1; Yudo π3

Powertrain
- Electric motor: 70 kW - 165 Nm
- Battery: 31.95 or 41.7 kWh (115.0 or 150.1 MJ) lithium ion
- Electric range: 320 kilometres (199 mi); 415 kilometres (258 mi)

Dimensions
- Wheelbase: 2,480 mm (97.6 in)
- Length: 4,035 mm (158.9 in)
- Width: 1,736 mm (68.3 in)
- Height: 1,625 mm (64.0 in)
- Curb weight: 1,605–1,685 kg (3,538–3,715 lb)

Chronology
- Predecessor: Yudo π1

The Yudo Yuntu (Chinese: 云兔) is a subcompact crossover SUV produced by the Chinese NEV manufacturer Yudo Auto. The platform of the Yudo Yuntu is based on the Yudo π1, whiuch itself is based on the Haval H1.

== Overview ==
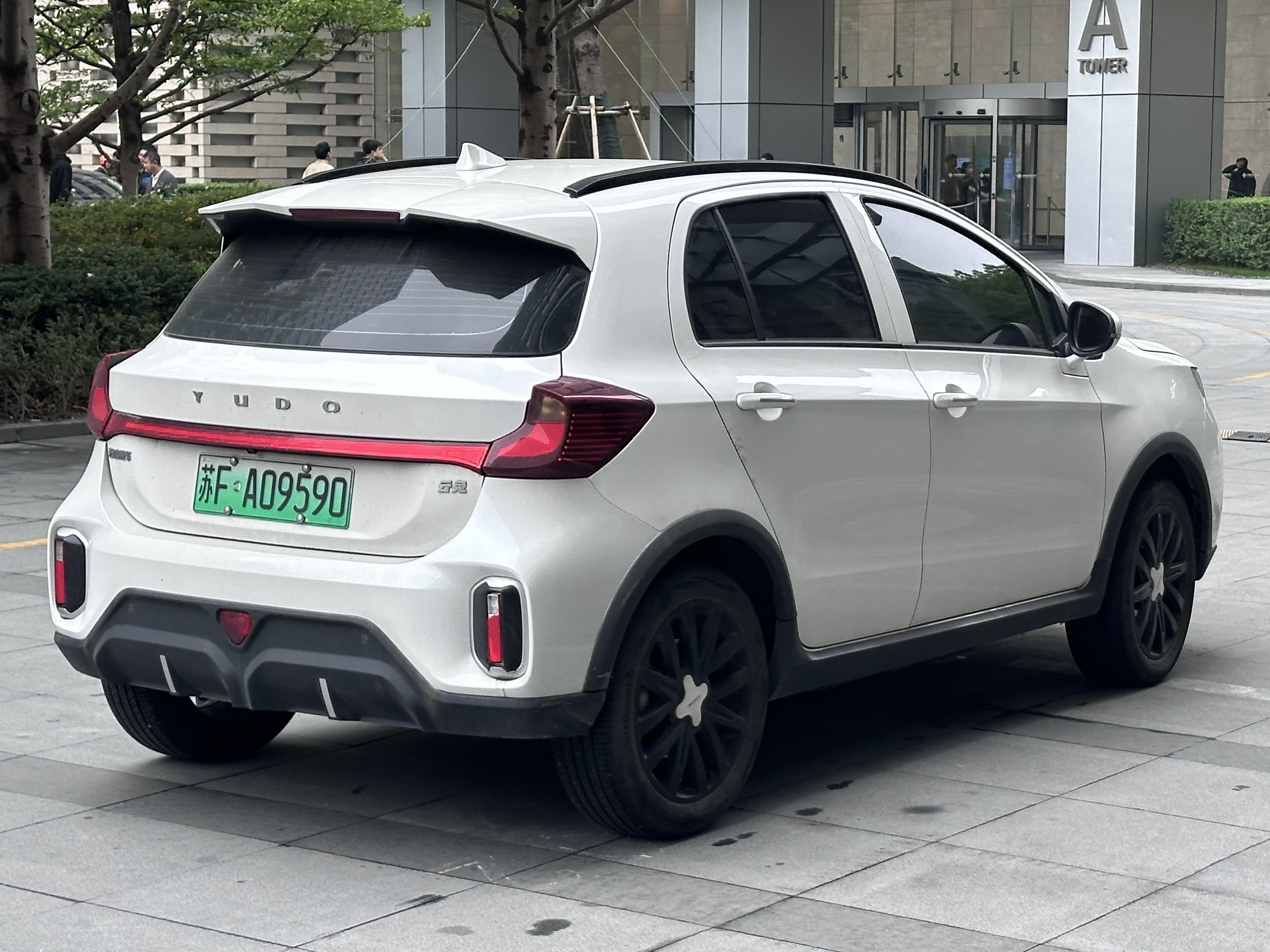
Rear view

EMC Yudo (Italy)

The Yudo Yuntu was launched on the Chinese car market in February 2023. Initial price ranges from 85,800 to 95,800 yuan.

The Yudo Yuntu was powered by a single front positioned permanent magnet synchronous drive TZ180XS30HP motor produced by Hepu Power Co., Ltd., with a maximum power output of 70 kW (95 PS; 94 bhp). Battery options include a 31.95 kW·h lithium-ion battery capable of a 320 km, and a 41.7 kW·h lithium-ion battery capable of a 415 km range.

The Yuntu is known as the Yudo 3 in some export markets such as Turkey and Spain where the 41.7 kWh version is sold.
