= Keyton M70 =

Keyton (Qiteng) M70
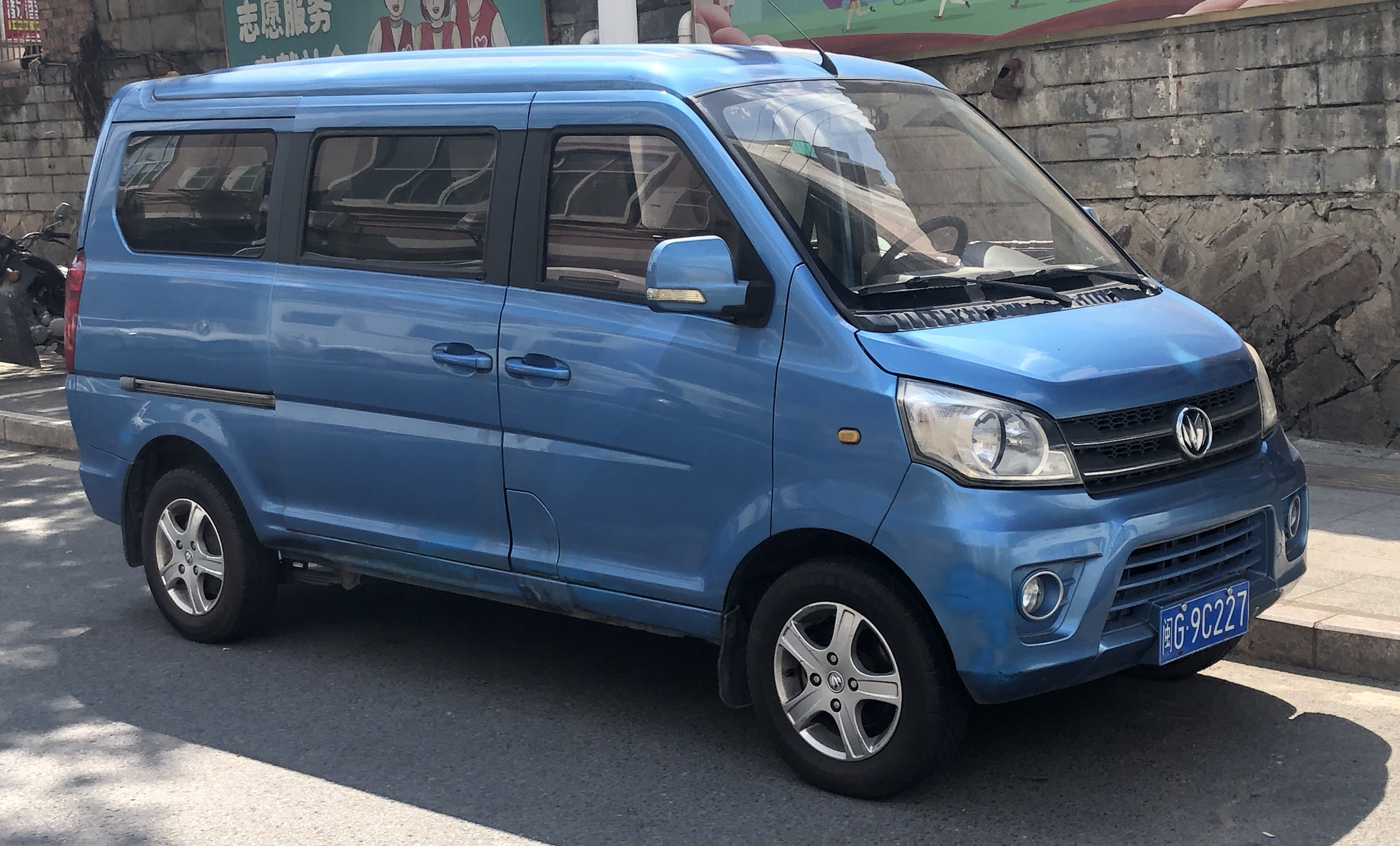

Overview
- Manufacturer: Keyton
- Also called: Golden Dragon Haishi Longyun GLE550; Yudo V01L; Jinlu Righto (Ruidu) V3 -XML6498; King Long KL8; Cenntro Logistar 200 (Europe, electric version)
- Production: 2014-present
- Assembly: China

Body and chassis
- Class: microvan
- Body style: 5-door van 2-door chassis cab/ box truck
- Layout: MR layout
- Doors: 5

Powertrain
- Engine: 1.2 L inline-4 engine 1.5 L inline-4 engine
- Transmission: 5-speed manual

Dimensions
- Wheelbase: 2,700 mm (106.3 in); 3,050 mm (120.1 in) (L variant)
- Length: 4,071 mm (160.3 in); 4,421 mm (174.1 in) (L variant)
- Width: 1,677 mm (66.0 in)
- Height: 1,902 mm (74.9 in)

The Keyton M70 is a microvan and micro truck made by the Keyton (Qiteng) brand of Fujian Motors Group from 2014. Keyton or Qiteng is a brand under FQT Motor, making various compact MPVs, microvans, and delivery vans.

== Overview ==
The Keyton M70 van variant is a two to five seat microvan and the first product of the Keyton brand. It is available as a standard wheelbase and a long wheelbase variant. The M70 was launched at the brand debut in 2014. Basic features include power windows, electronic mirrors, alloy wheels, USB port, and fog lamps.

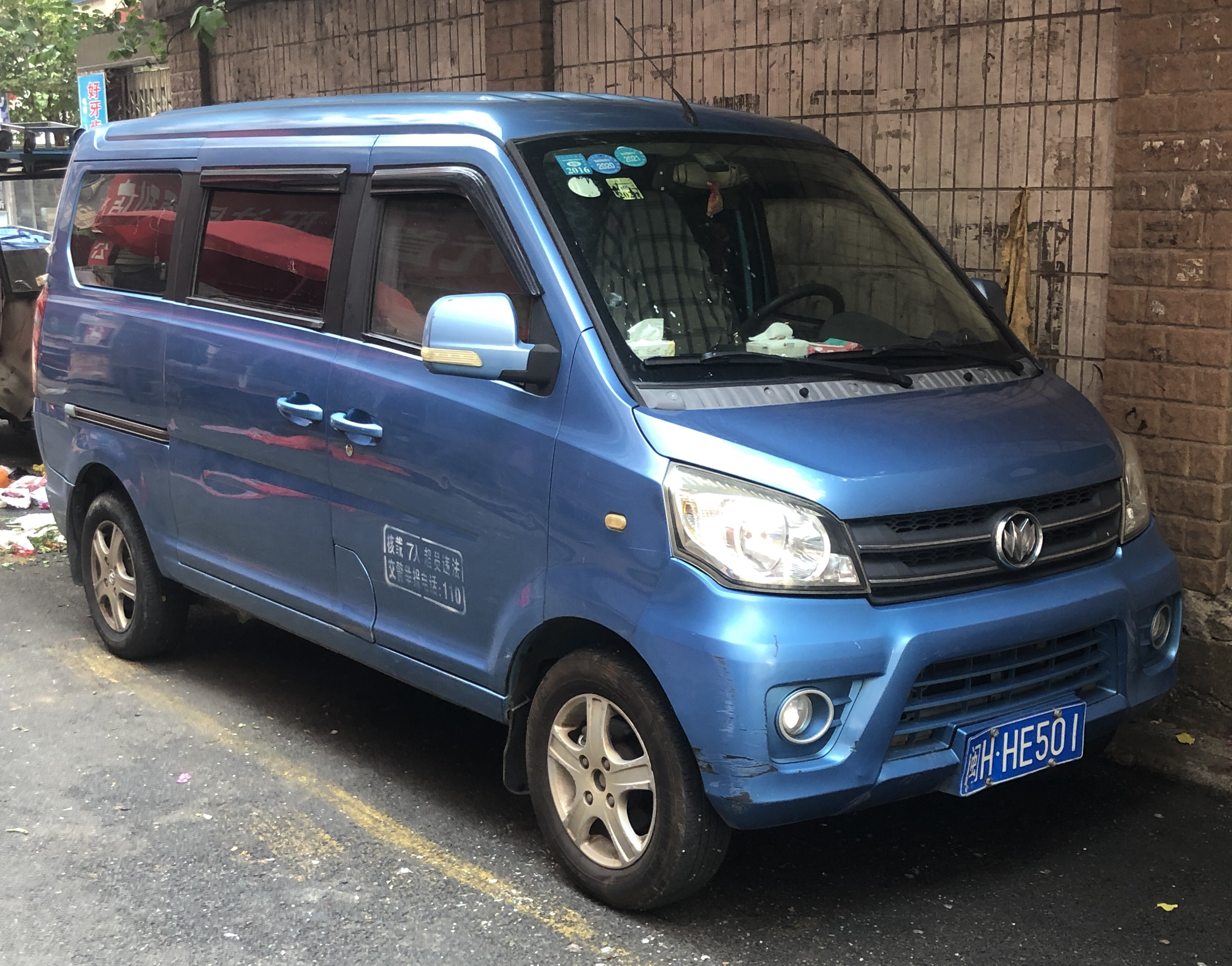
Front view of Keyton M70

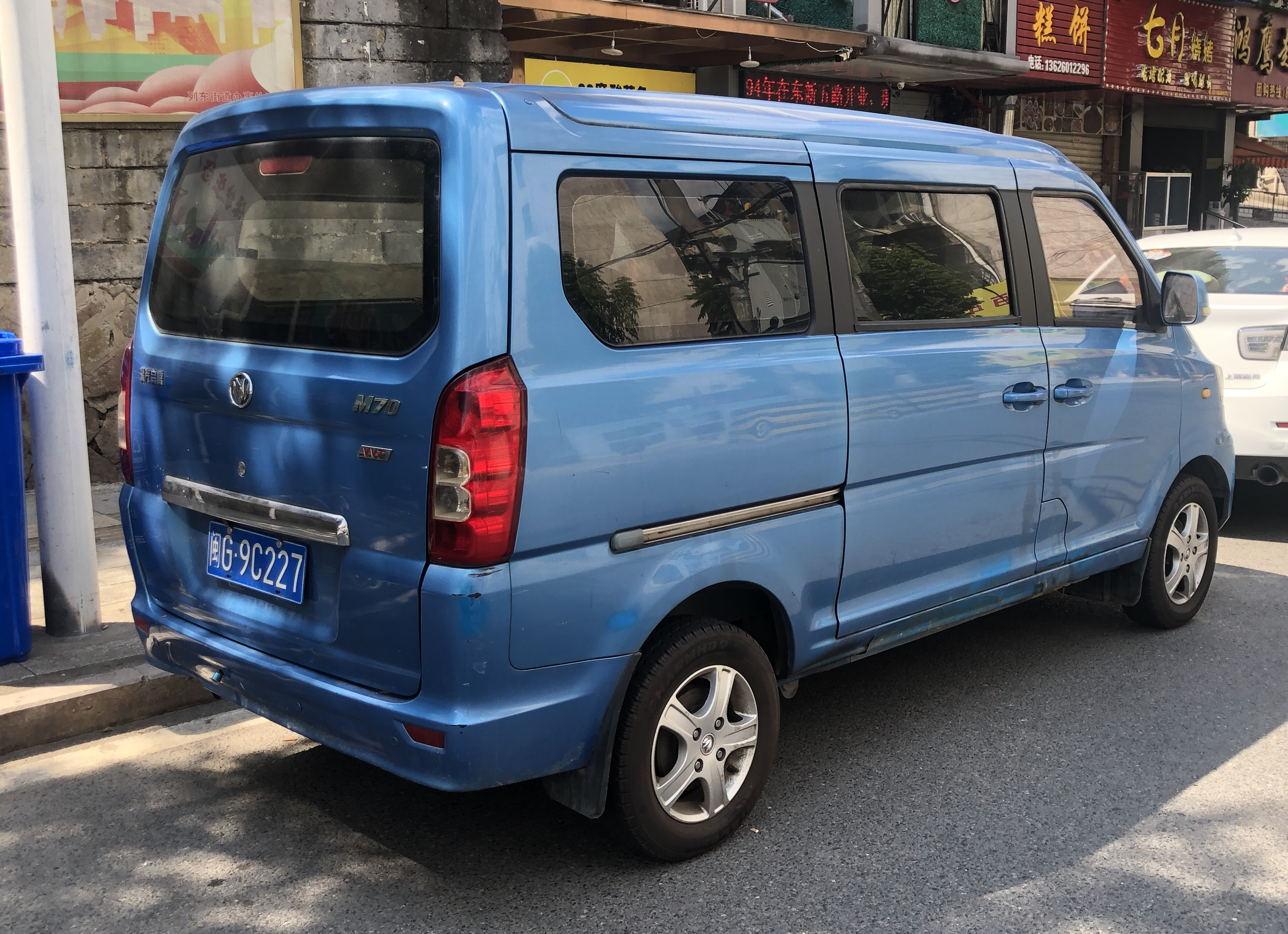
Rear view of Keyton M70

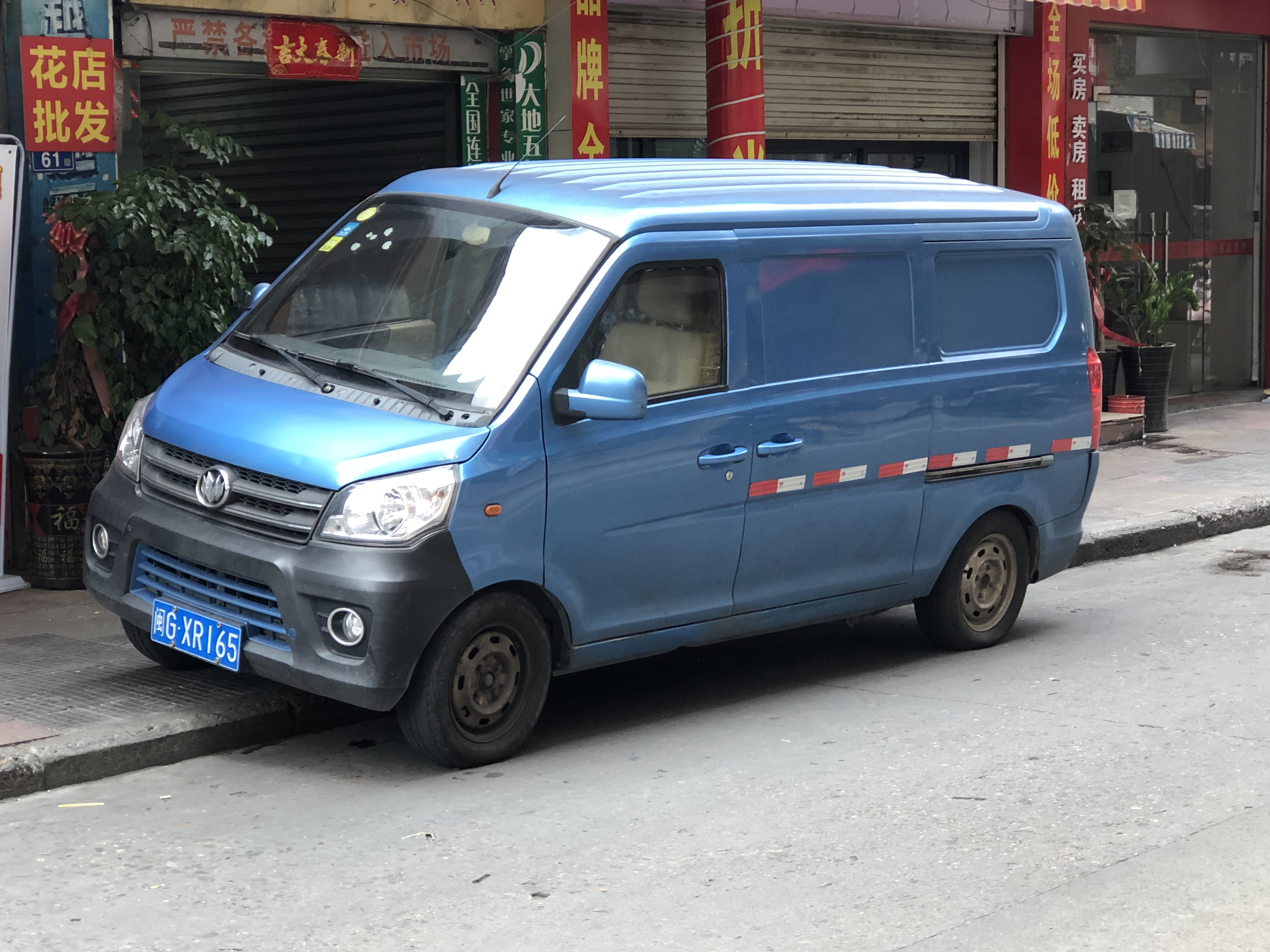
Keyton M70 base cargo version

=== Powertrain ===
At launch, power of the M70 passenger van comes from a 1.2 liter four-cylinder VVT petrol engine with 91 hp, mated to a five-speed manual transmission. As of 2020, only the panel van variant remains available. power of the M70 panel van comes from a 1.5 liter four-cylinder petrol engine with 122 hp, mated to a five-speed manual transmission.

== Keyton M70 EV ==
The Keyton M70 EV is the electric delivery van variant of the M70 microvan, produced for the logistics industry. The Keyton M70 EV is the first electric vehicle of Keyton. Just like the gasoline version, the electric microvan comes in standard and long-wheelbase 'L' variants. The electric motor of the M70 EV has an output of 82 hp and 220 Nm. The M70 EV is available with battery packs in 21.82kWh, 32.74kWh, 39.9kWh and 41.86kWh, offering an NEDC range of 150 km, 215 km, 252 km, and 280 km. According to Keyton, fast-charging will take 2 hours and normal-charging takes 6 hours. The loading capacity of the M70 EV is 600 kilograms. Price of the M70 EV after subsidies starts at 75,800 yuan and ends at 112,800 yuan ($10,770 - US$16,032). The M70 EV was later also rebadged as the Golden Dragon Haishi Longyun GLE550, Yudo V01L, and Jinlu Righto (Ruidu) V3 (XML6498).

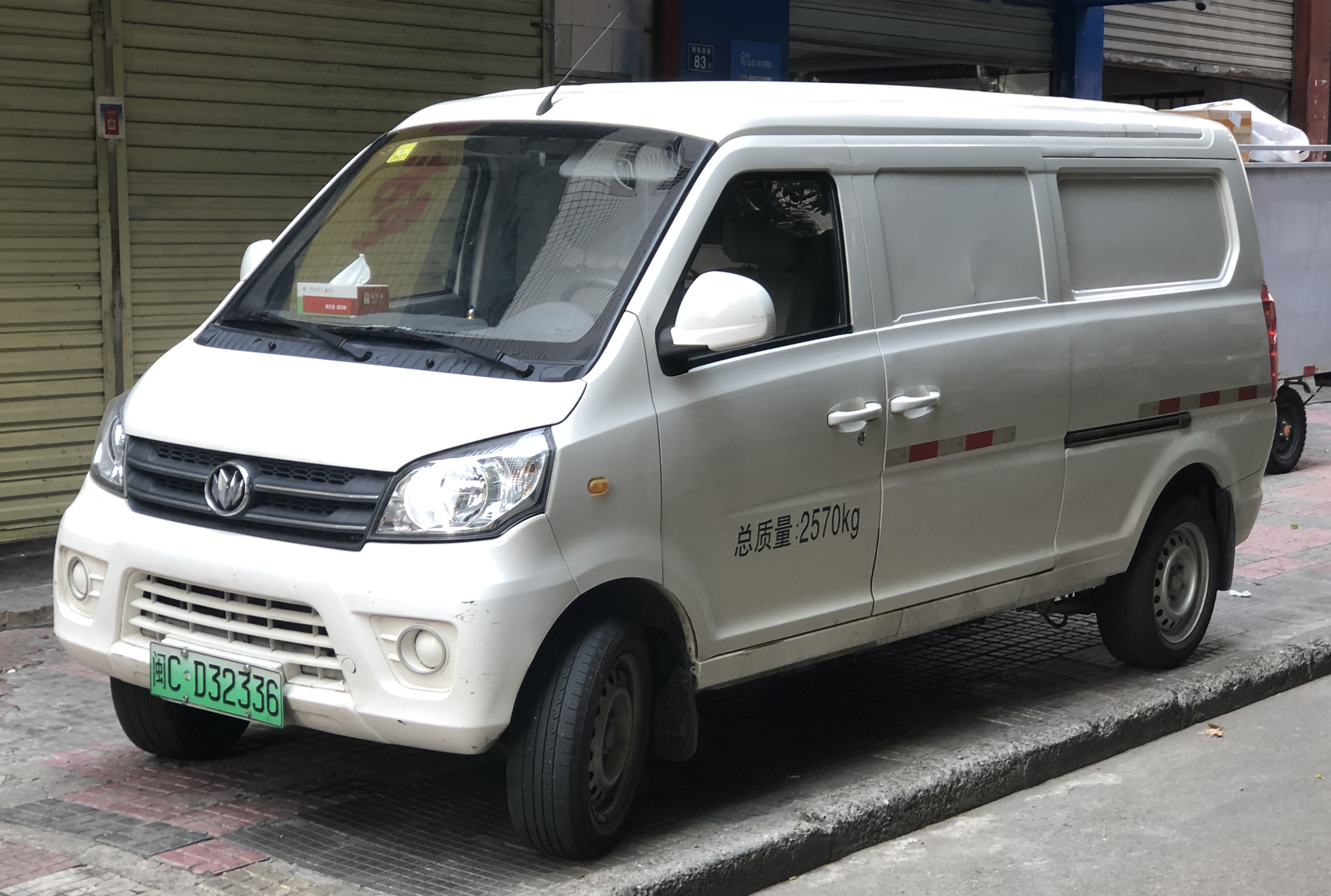
Front view of M70L EV

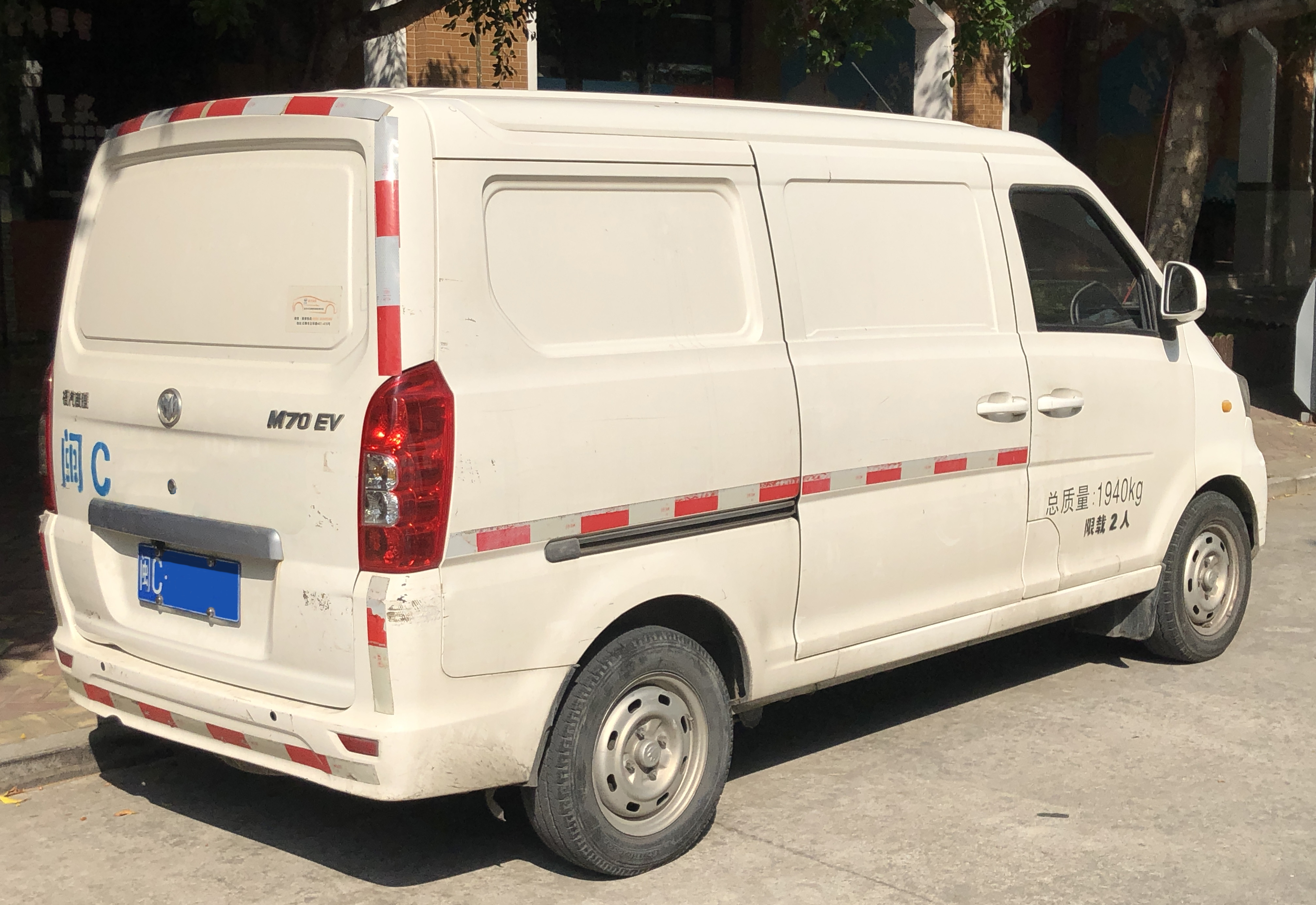
Rear view of M70 EV

=== Golden Dragon Haishi Longyun GLE550 ===
A rebadged variant of the Keyton M70 EV was sold by Golden Dragon as the Golden Dragon Haishi Longyun GLE550. The variant was also produced for the logistics industry. The Haishi Longyun GLE550 can be powered by batteries made by CATL or Huizhou Yipeng. The electric microvan is equipped with an electric motor reaching a maximum power of 80 kW and a maximum torque of 270 N.m.

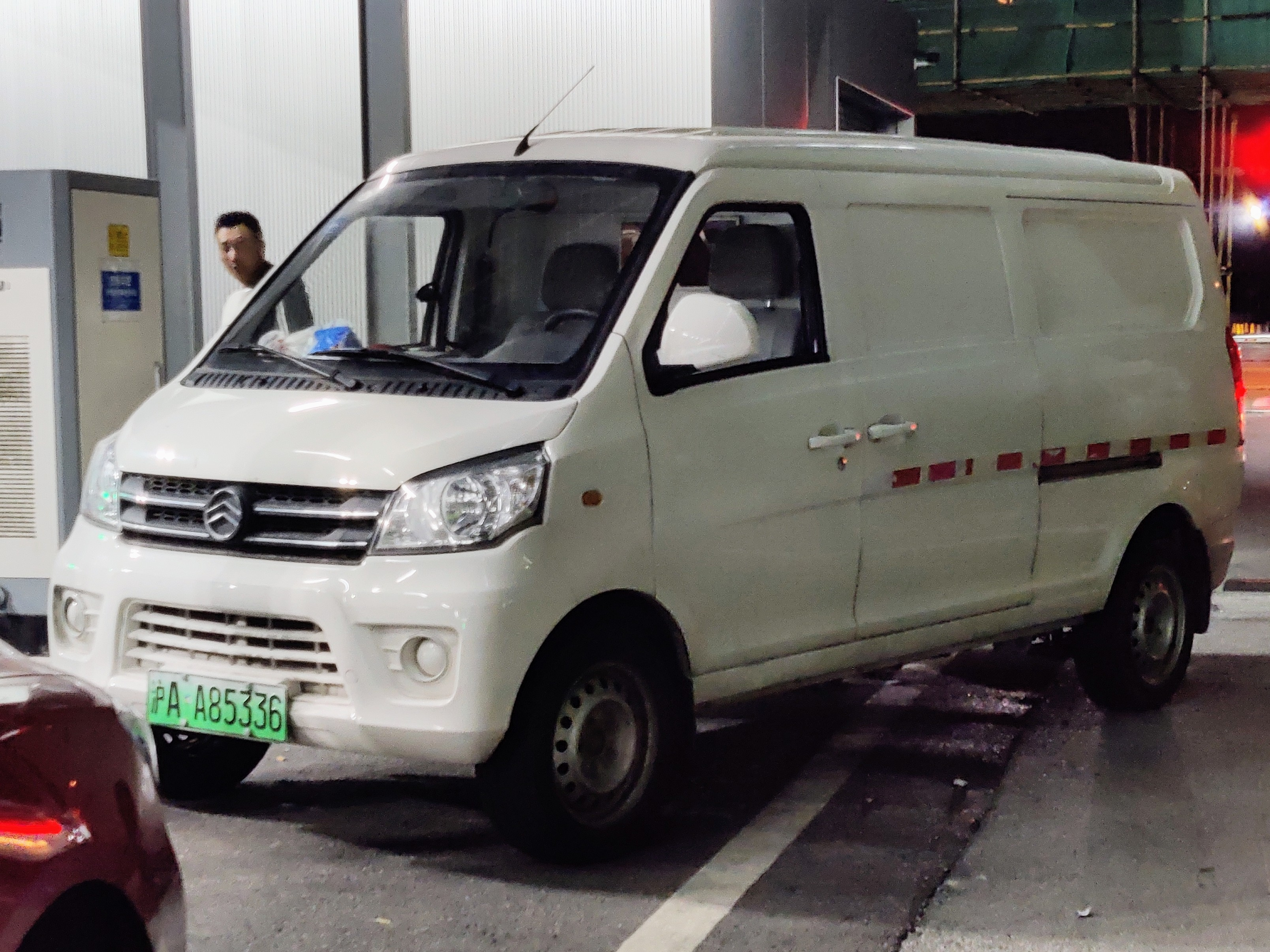
Front view of Longyun GLE550

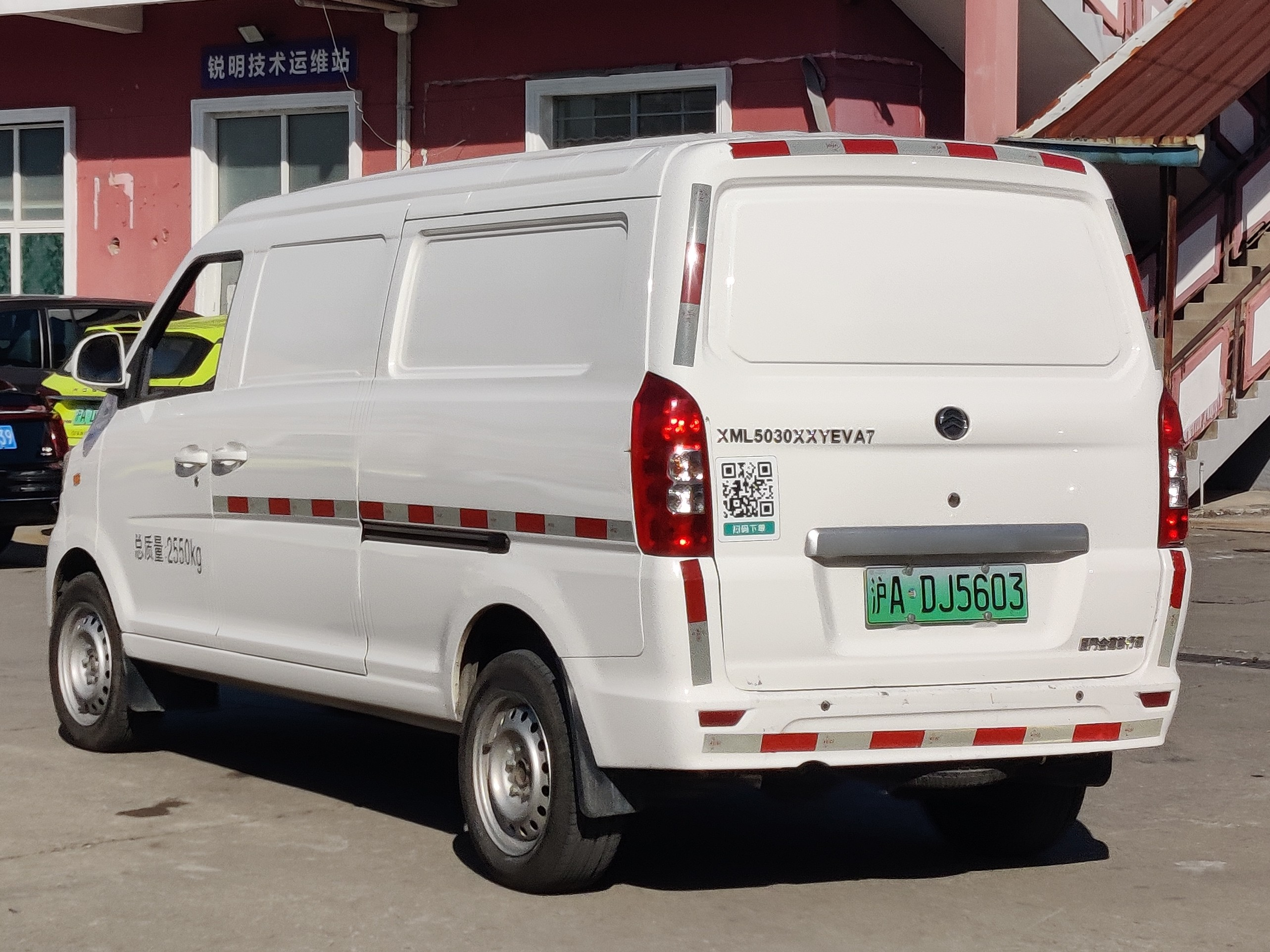
Rear view of Longyun GLE550 (Rebadged M70 EV)

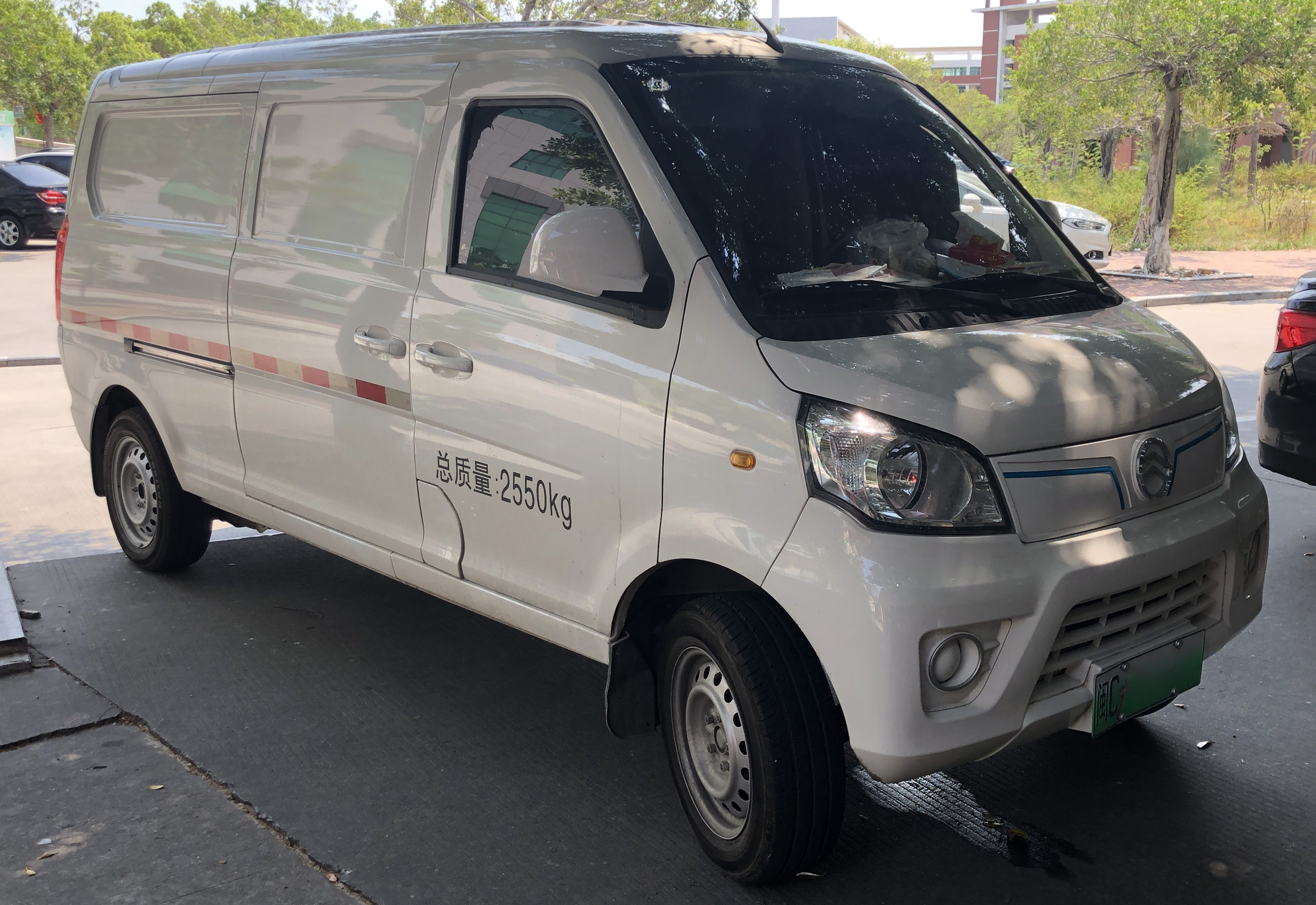
Front view of Longyun GLE550 facelift

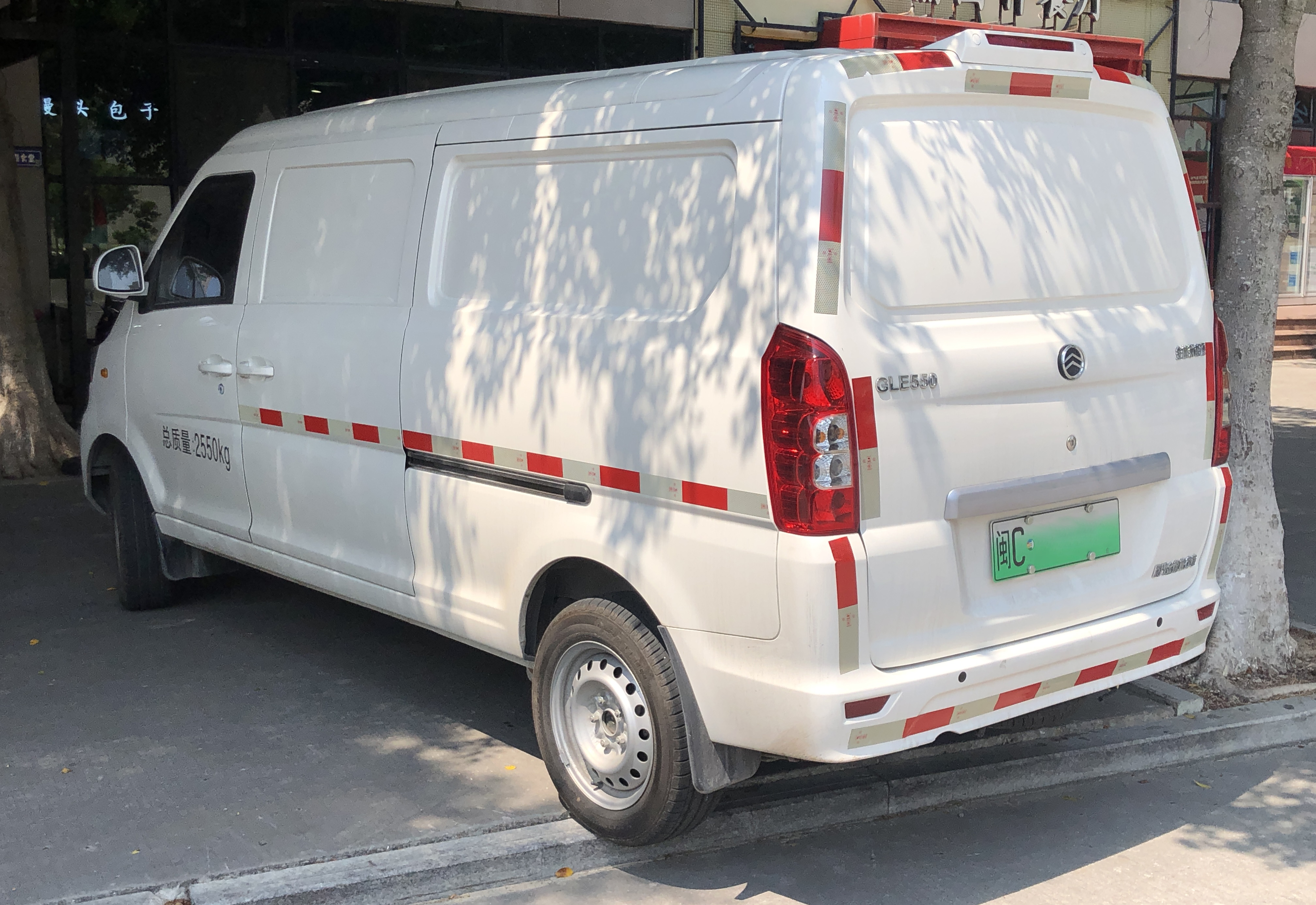
Rear view of Longyun GLE550 facelift
