= Fujian Benz =

Company

Fujian Benz Automotive Co., Ltd.
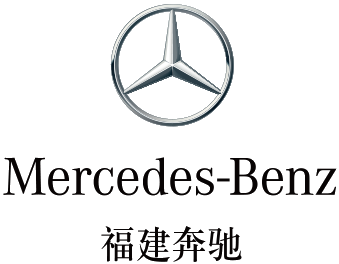
- Native name: 福建奔驰汽车有限公司
- Type: Joint venture
- Industry: Automotive
- Founded: June 2007; 19 years ago
- Headquarters: Fuzhou, China
- Area served: China
- Key people: Kong Xiao (President and CEO)
- Products: Minivans, Multi Purpose Vehicles and Special Purpose Vehicles
- Owners: Mercedes-Benz Group; Fujian Motors Group; China Motor Corporation
- Number of employees: 1,600 (2016)
- Website: fujianbenz.com

Fujian Benz Automotive Co., Ltd., formerly Fujian Daimler Automotive Co., Ltd., is a light commercial vehicle manufacturing company based in Fuzhou, and a joint venture between Daimler Vans Hong Kong Limited (a joint venture of the Mercedes-Benz Group and China Motor Corporation of Taiwan), BAIC Motor Corporation Limited (35%), and Fujian Motor Industry Group Co., Ltd (15%).

== History ==
The company was founded in June 2007 as Fujian Daimler Automotive Co. by Fujian Motor Industry Group (50%), Daimler (34%) and China Motor Corp. (16%). It began construction of an assembly plant in the Qingkou Investment Zone, Fúzhōu in October 2007. The 660,000 square meter plant would cost over €200 million (US$284 million). With 2,800 employees, the plant has a capacity of 40,000 vehicles a year. For establishing of the joint venture and building the plant facilities, Fujian Motor Industry Group Company and the Hong Kong Daimler Vans Limited invested a total of €434,600,000.

Series production of Fujian Daimler's first product range, the Viano transporter, began in April 2010.

In November 2011, Sprinter was launched. Fujian Daimler changed its name to Fujian Benz in March 2012 for better brand recognition among Chinese consumers as Daimler is not as well known as Benz.

In March 2013 Fujian Benz opened a new product development center in Fuzhou, constructed at a cost of around RMB 500 million (approximately €60 million).

In March 2016, Fujian Benz launched three V-Class models, including V260, V260 Exclusive and V260L Exclusive.

== Operations ==
Fujian Benz covers 660,000 square meters, including 330,000 square meters for Phase I and a construction area of 162,000 square meters. The company currently employs 1,600 workers.

The annual production capacity of Phase I is 40,000 units. At one time, China was the largest market of the Viano.

At its production plant in Qinkou, Fujian Benz operates a product development center which covers approximately 11,000 square meters of built-up area, as well as a 53,000-square-meter proving ground including a 1,400-meter circuit. In an industrial park adjacent to the Qinkou production plant, Fujian Benz operates an EMC lab, an exhaust gas test lab, and a chassis dynamometers facility, which cover a combined built-up area of around 8,000 square meters. The product development center, with a total investment of 500 million RMB, was put into operation in 2013.

== Current production ==
Fujian Benz currently produces the following vehicles:

Mercedes-Benz Vito

Mercedes Benz V-Klasse

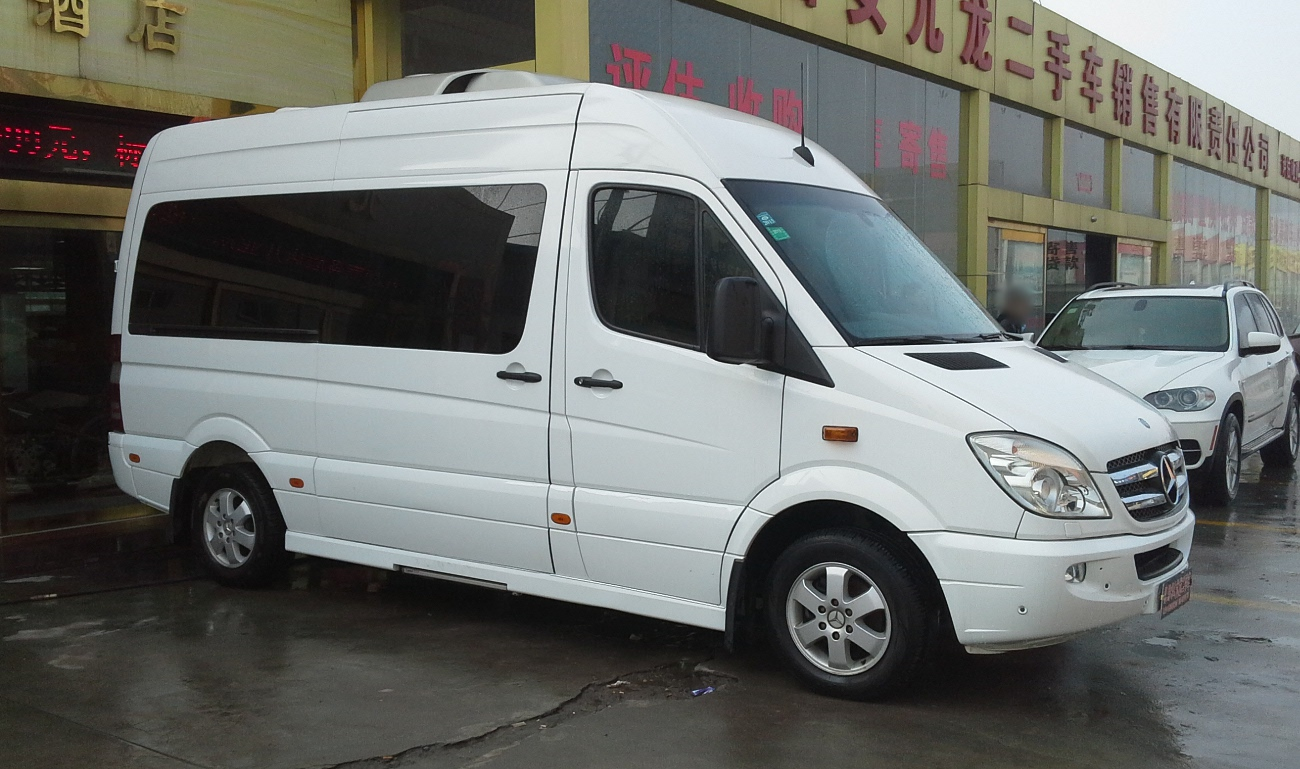
Mercedes-Benz Sprinter

== Former production ==
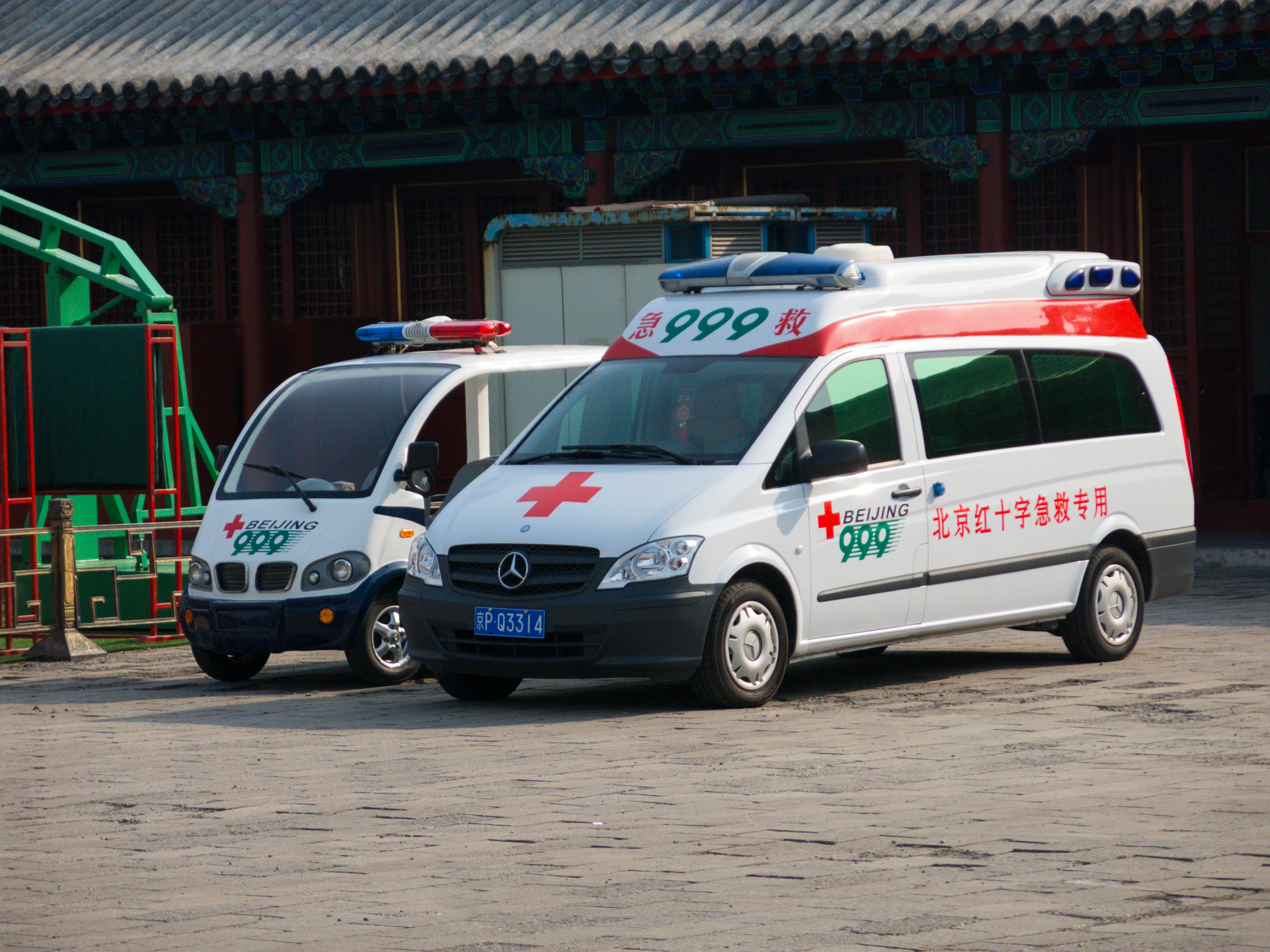
2010–2015
梅赛德斯-奔驰威霆
Mercedes-Benz Vito

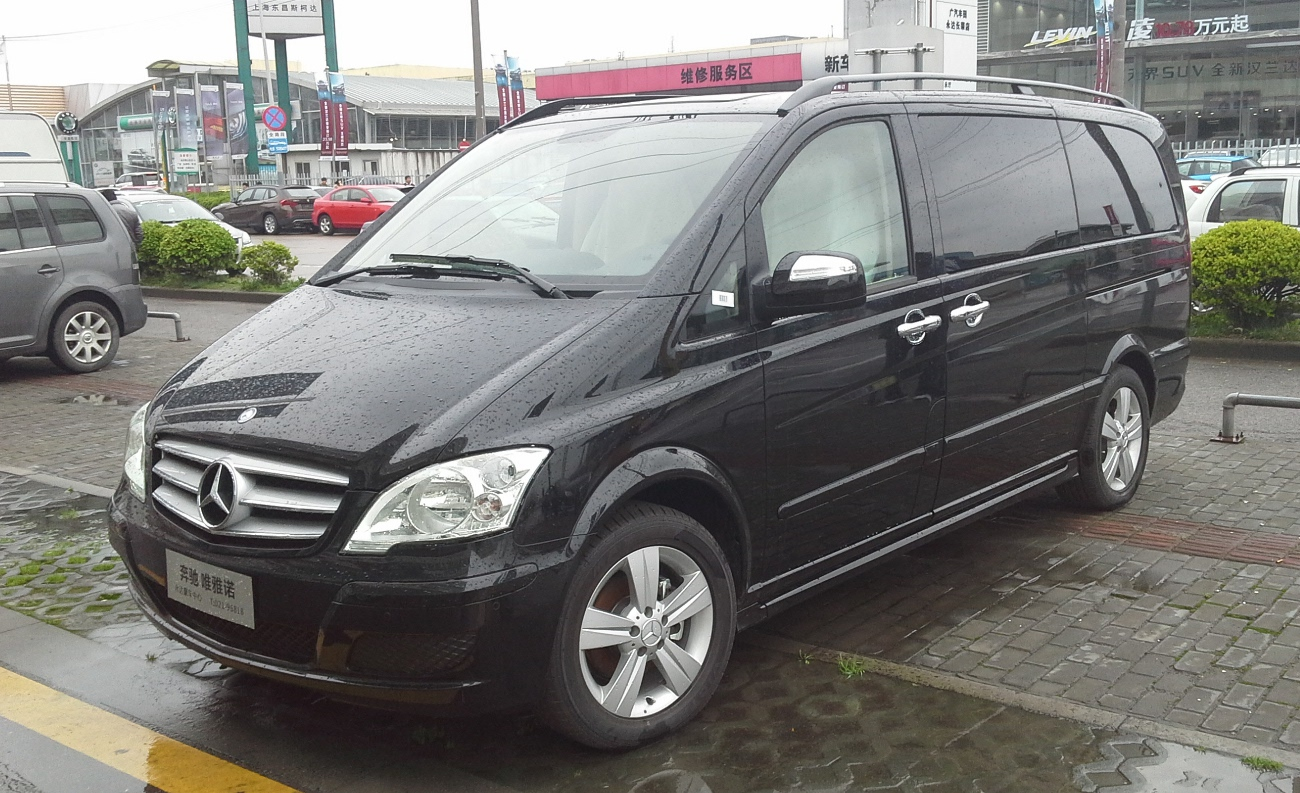
2011–2015
梅赛德斯-奔驰唯雅诺
Mercedes-Benz Viano
