= Yudo π1 =

Subcompact crossover SUV

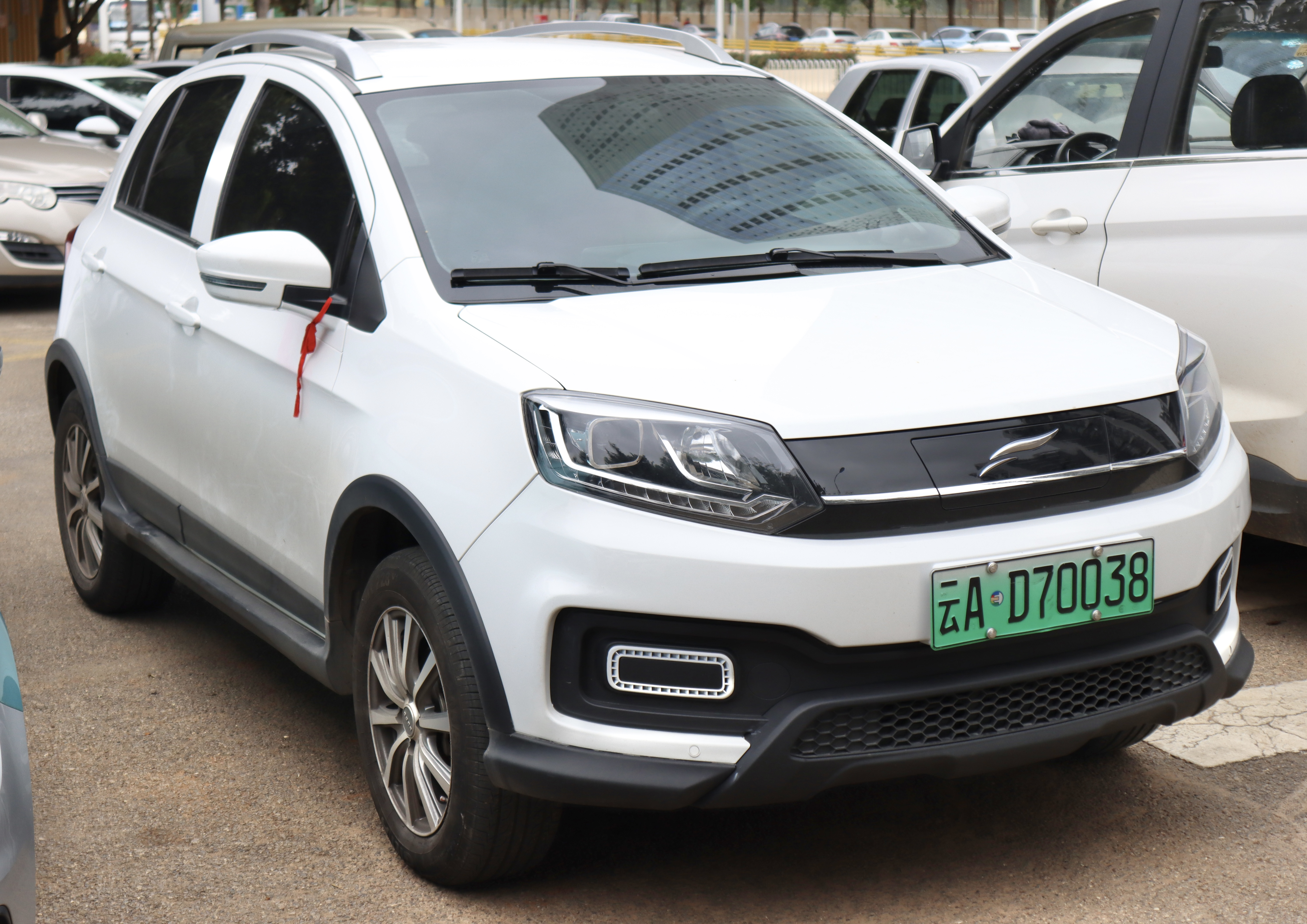

Overview
- Manufacturer: Yudo Auto
- Production: 2018–2023
- Assembly: China: Putian

Body and chassis
- Class: Subcompact crossover SUV
- Body style: 5-door SUV
- Layout: Front-motor, front-wheel drive (single motor)
- Related: Yudo π3; Yudo Yuntu

Powertrain
- Electric motor: 55 kW - 170 Nm; 90 kW - 270 Nm
- Battery: 38.5 or 51 or 49.8 kWh (139 or 184 or 179 MJ) lithium ion
- Electric range: 301 kilometres (187 mi) 360 (2018); 426 kilometres (265 mi) Pro (2019); 430 kilometres (267 mi) Pro (2020)

Dimensions
- Wheelbase: 2,460 mm (96.9 in)
- Length: 4,010 mm (157.9 in)
- Width: 1,729 mm (68.1 in)
- Height: 1,621 mm (63.8 in)
- Curb weight: 1,380–1,410 kg (3,042–3,109 lb)

Chronology
- Successor: Yudo Yuntu

The Yudo π1 or Yudo Pi1 is a subcompact crossover SUV produced by the Chinese NEV manufacturer Yudo Auto. The side profile heavily resembles a second generation Haval H1 due to the platform being shared by Haval.

== Overview ==
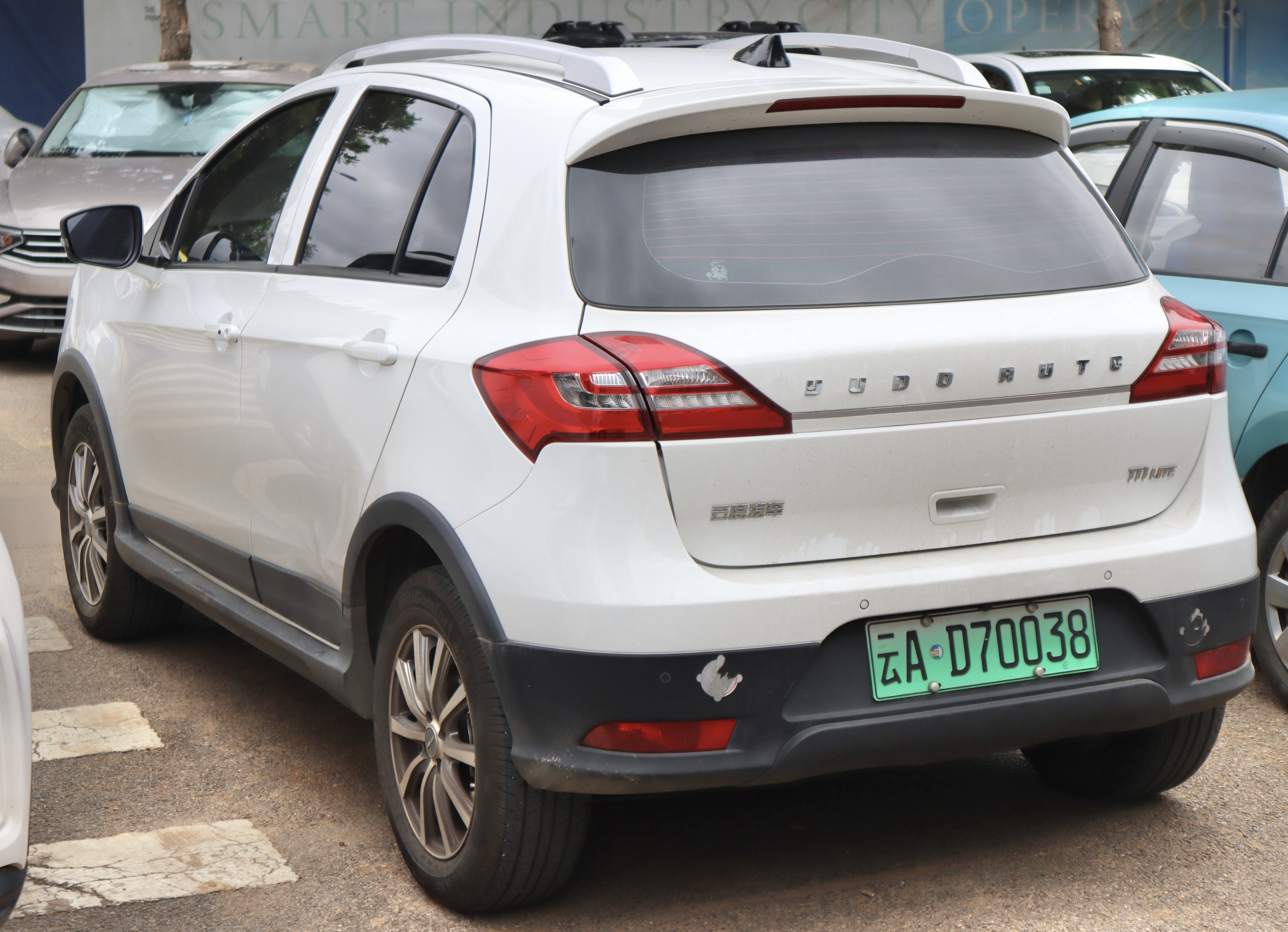
Rear view

The Yudo π1 was launched on the Chinese car market in 2019. Initial price ranges from 131,800 to 166,800 yuan.

The Yudo π1 was powered by a single front positioned motor with the motor options including a 55 kW-170Nm motor and a 90 kW-270Nm motor. Battery options include a 38.5lkWh lithium-ion battery capable of a 301 km range for 2018, a 51kWh lithium-ion battery capable of a 426 km range for 2019, and a 49.8kWh lithium-ion battery capable of a 430 km range for 2020.
