= Yudo π3 =

Subcompact crossover SUV

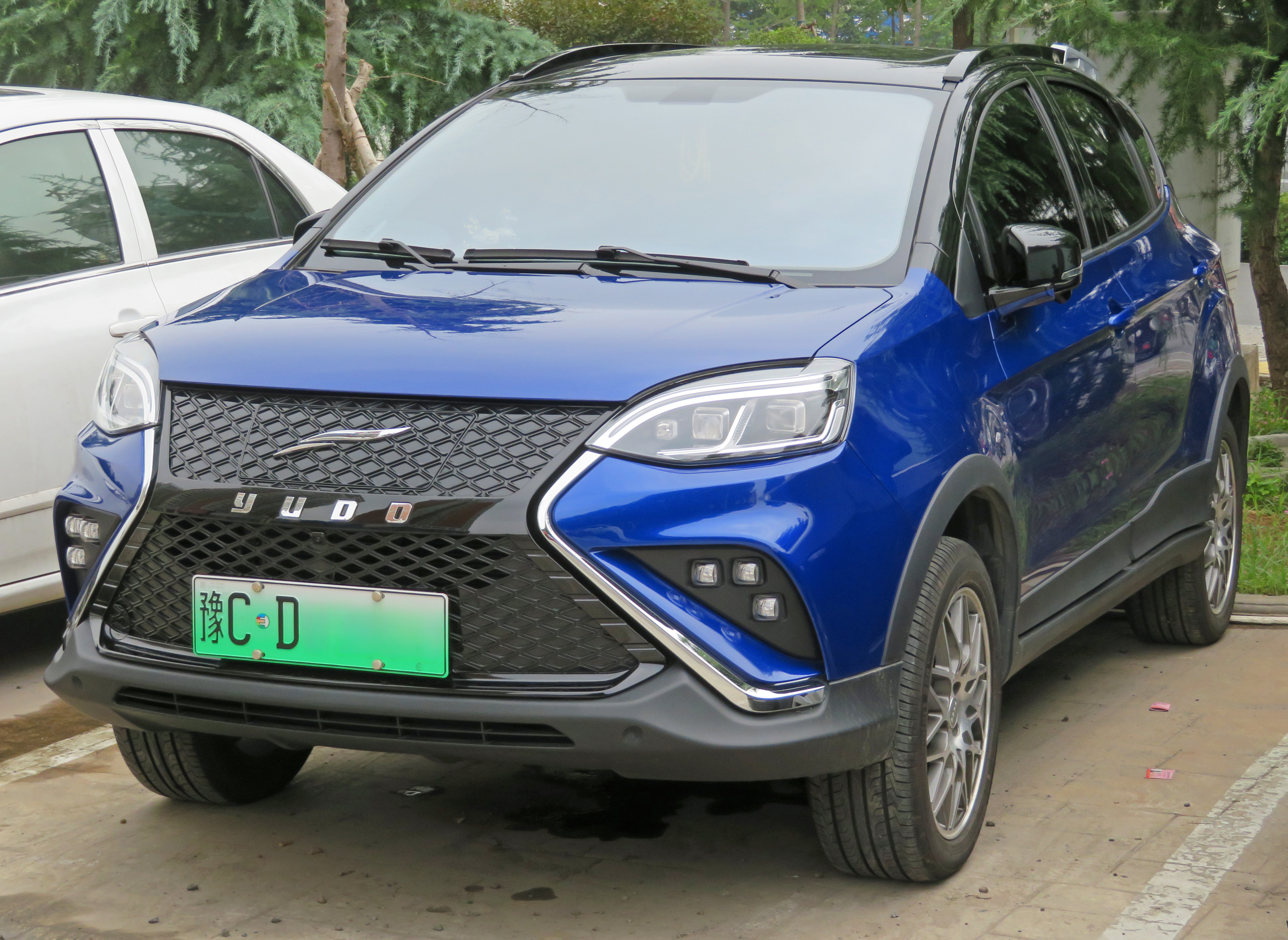

Overview
- Manufacturer: Yudo Auto
- Also called: Ciwei Smile
- Production: 2018–2022
- Assembly: China: Putian

Body and chassis
- Class: Subcompact crossover SUV
- Body style: 5-door SUV
- Layout: Front-motor, front-wheel drive (single motor)
- Related: Yudo π1; Yudo Yuntu

Powertrain
- Electric motor: 55 kW - 170 Nm; 90 kW - 270 Nm
- Battery: 51 kWh (180 MJ) lithium ion
- Electric range: 401 kilometres (249 mi)

Dimensions
- Wheelbase: 2,602 mm (102.4 in)
- Length: 4,340 mm (170.9 in)
- Width: 1,765 mm (69.5 in)
- Height: 1,610 mm (63.4 in)
- Curb weight: 1,470 kg (3,241 lb)

The Yudo π3 or Yudo Pi3 is a subcompact crossover SUV produced by the Chinese NEV manufacturer Yudo Auto.

== Overview ==
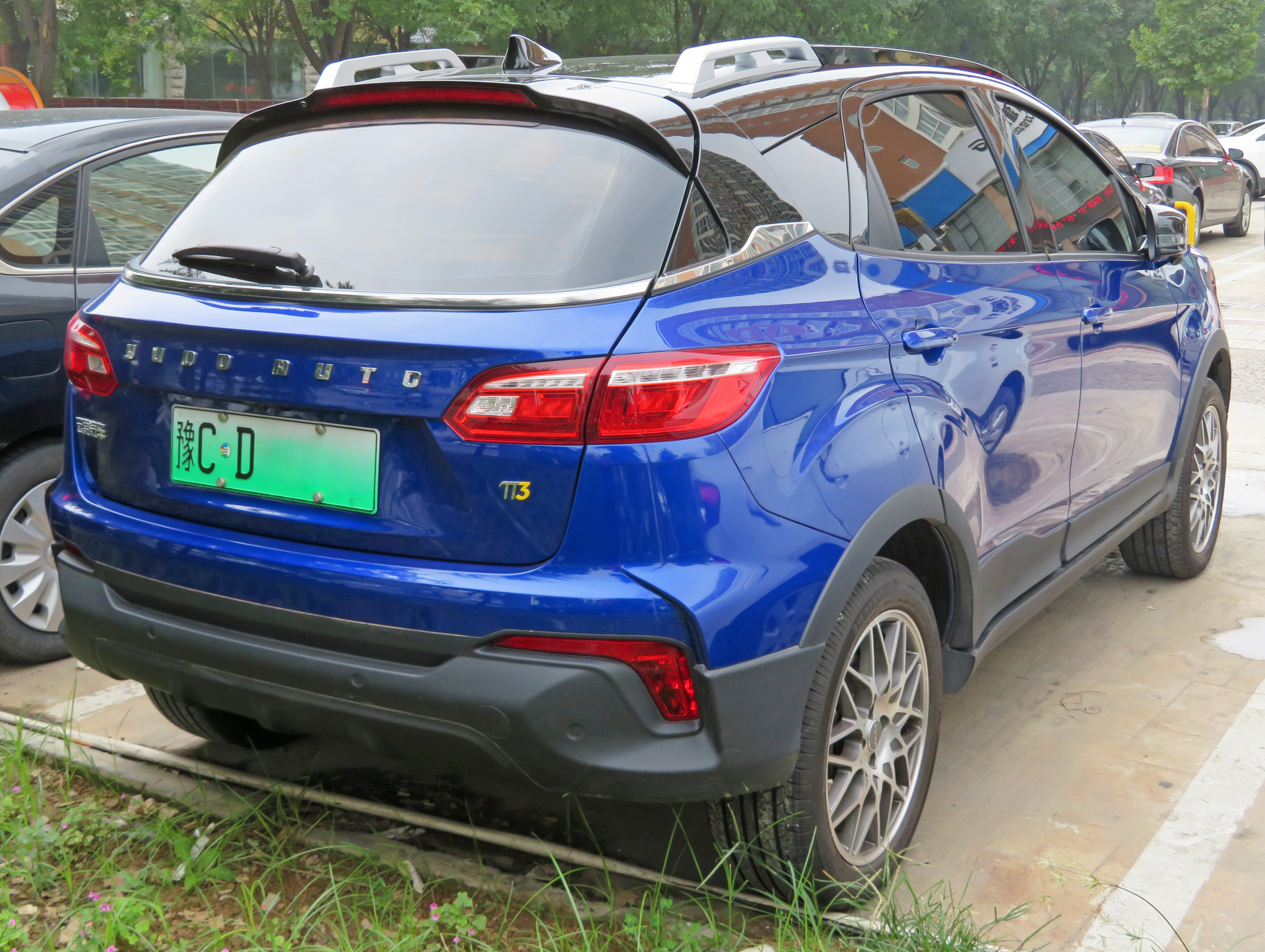
Rear view

The Yudo π3 was launched on the Chinese market in 2019. Initial price ranges from 179,800 to 192,800 yuan.

The Yudo π3 was powered by a single front positioned motor producing 90kW and 270Nm motor. The battery of the Yudo π3 is a 51kWh lithium-ion battery capable of a 401km range for 2019.
