= King Long Kairui =

Light commercial van

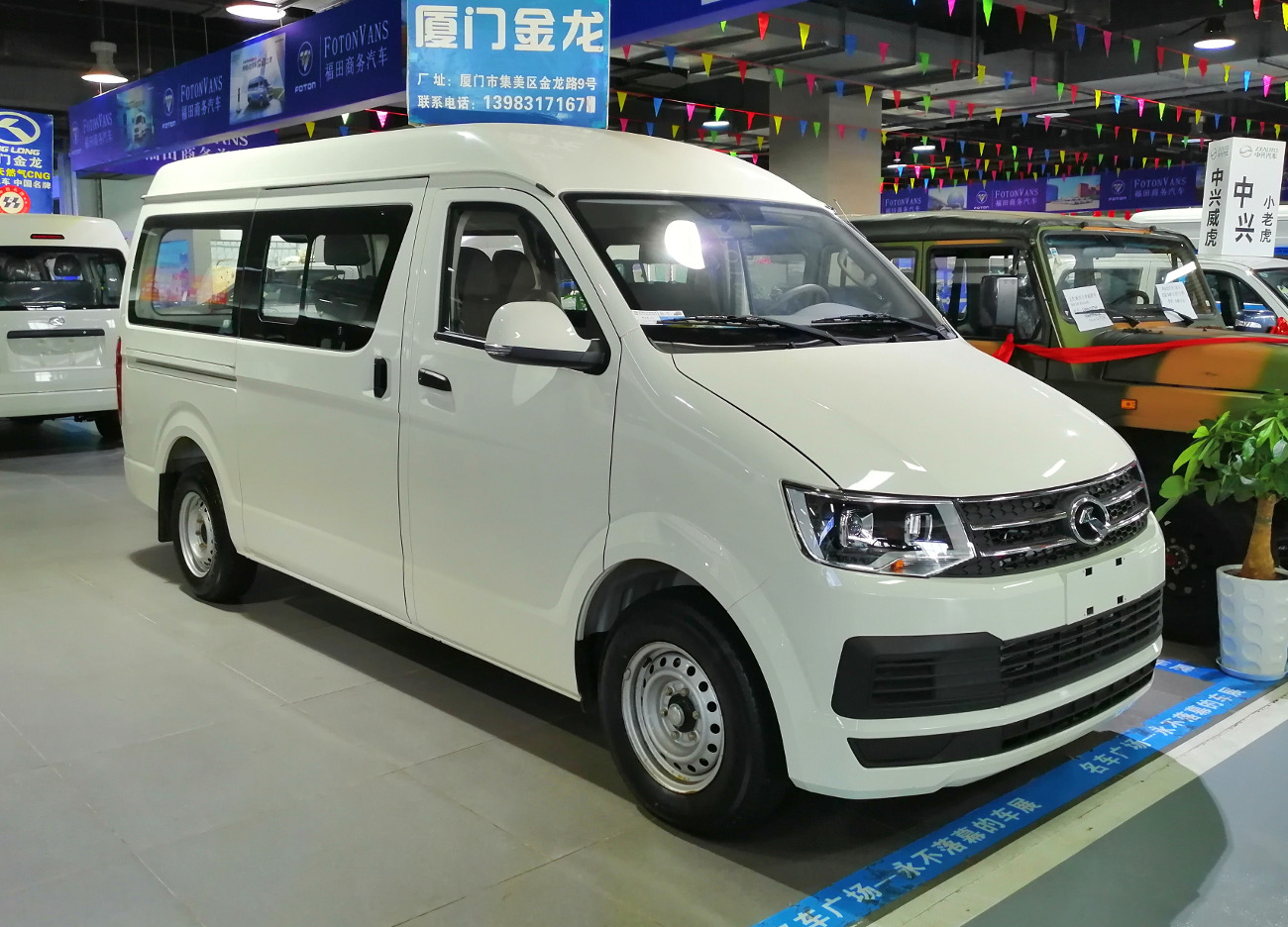

Overview
- Manufacturer: King Long
- Also called: SEM Delica/Soueast EV500 (electric version)
- Production: 2018–present
- Assembly: China

Body and chassis
- Class: Light commercial vehicle (M)
- Body style: 4-door van 4-door minibus
- Layout: Front engine, rear-wheel drive
- Related: King Long Kaige

Powertrain
- Engine: 2.0 L 4G20 I4 (turbo petrol); 2.2 L V22 I4 (petrol)
- Transmission: 5-speed manual

Dimensions
- Wheelbase: 3,350 mm (131.9 in)
- Length: 5,310 mm (209.1 in)
- Width: 1,705 mm (67.1 in)
- Height: 2,185 mm (86.0 in)
- Curb weight: 1,800–1,960 kg (3,968–4,321 lb)

The King Long Kairui (Chinese: 厦门金龙-凯锐浩克) is a light commercial van produced by the Chinese manufacturer King Long since 2018.

== Overview ==
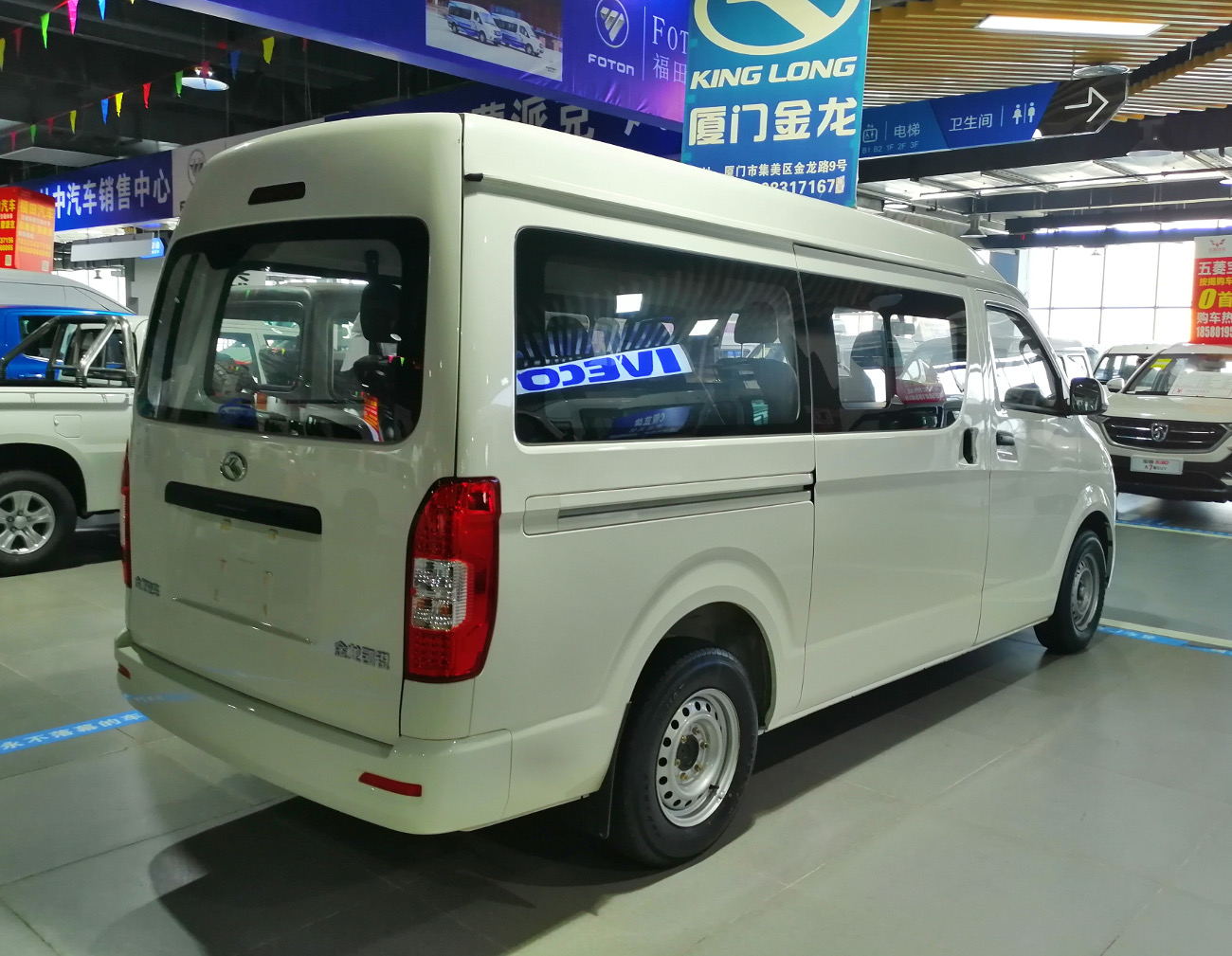
Rear view

The Kairui was launched in 2018 with prices ranging from 71,800 to 160,000 yuan. Despite being a front-engined model, parts on the rear half of the Kairui after the B-pillars were shared with the cab-forward King Long Kaige. Styling is controversial as just like the Kaige, the rear half of the vehicle heavily resembles the Toyota Hiace, while the front fascia of the vehicle is heavily inspired by the Volkswagen Transporter (T6).

== Powertrain ==
The Kairui is powered by a 2.0 liter turbo engine developing 215hp and 282N·m and a 2.2 liter naturally aspirated engine developing 112hp and 198N·m. Gearbox options include a 5-speed manual transmission and a 6-speed manual transmission.
