= King Long =

Chinese bus manufacturer

King Long United Automotive Industry Co., Ltd 厦门金龙联合汽车工业有限公司
- Type: Joint venture
- Industry: Automotive manufacturing
- Founded: 1988; 38 years ago
- Headquarters: Xiamen, Fujian, China
- Area served: Worldwide
- Key people: Xie Weiguo. (CEO): Su Liang MPA (COO)
- Products: Minibuses; Buses
- Owner: Fujian Motors Group (15%)
- Subsidiaries: Higer Bus; Golden Dragon
- Website: www.king-long.com

King Long United Automotive Industry Co., Ltd (Chinese: 厦门金龙联合汽车工业有限公司) or commonly known as King Long (simplified Chinese: 金龙; traditional Chinese: 金龍; pinyin: Jīnlóng, literally, Golden Dragon) is a Chinese bus manufacturer headquartered in Xiamen, Fujian. Founded in December 1988, it is focused mainly on developing, manufacturing and selling large-and-medium-sized coaches and light vans. In 2024, King Long ranked no.113 on World Brand Lab's "China's 500 Most Influential Brands" list.

== History ==
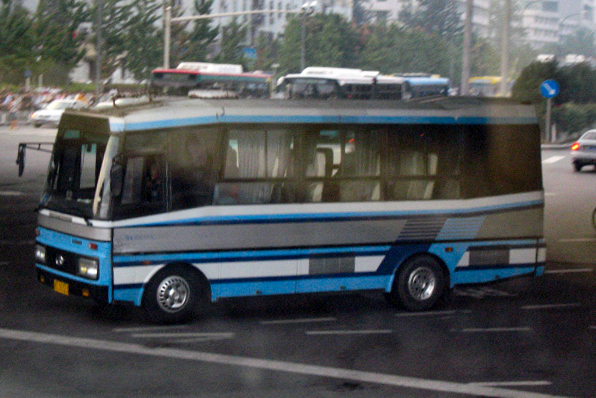
XMQ6700, King Long's first model with bodywork similar to Padane MX

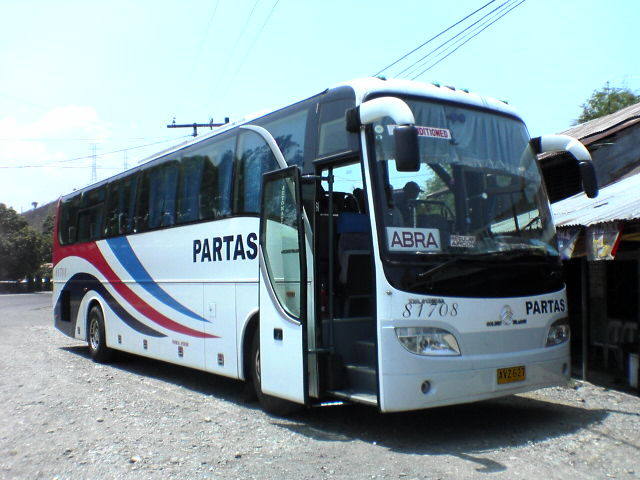
One of the Golden Dragon buses operating in the Philippines with the Partas Transportation Co. Inc.

Established in December 1988, King Long United Automotive Industry Co., Ltd. is one of the joint ventures in China with a long history in the coach manufacturing industry. The company is now jointly owned by Xiamen Automotive Industry Corporation, Xiamen State-owned Assets Investment Co., Ltd and San Yang Industry Co., Ltd. from Taiwan, with the share proportion of each holder being 50%, 25% and 25% respectively. The King Long Group (厦门金龙汽车集团) owns three subsidiaries, King Long United Automotive Industry Co., Ltd, Xiamen Golden Dragon Bus Co., Ltd., and the Higer Bus Co. Ltd.

=== Export collaborations ===
In July 2023, Australian bus and coach dealer Bus Stop Sales announced it had worked with King Long and local body manufacturer Volgren to create the King Long EVolution Complete low-floor single-deck battery electric bus for the Australian bus market. The EVolution Complete, also available as the EVolution Chassis for a range of other bodies to be potentially built, is equipped with VDO electronics, CATL batteries, Thermo King air conditioning and ZF Friedrichshafen drive axles.

On 29 January 2025, Northern Irish bus manufacturer Wrightbus entered in collaboration with King Long under the 'Rightech' sub-brand, launching the 6 metres (20 ft) Rightech RB6 and 9 metres (30 ft) RB9 low-floor single-deck battery electric buses in both left- and right-hand drive configurations for both the United Kingdom and European bus markets.

== Manufacturing facilities ==
The King Long facilities cover a total area of 200,000 square meters with over 1800 employees, of whom 400 are technical engineers, and 30 are postgraduates, who play a key role in different sections such as R&D, IT, production management, quality control, finance, sales and after-sales services.

== Business ==
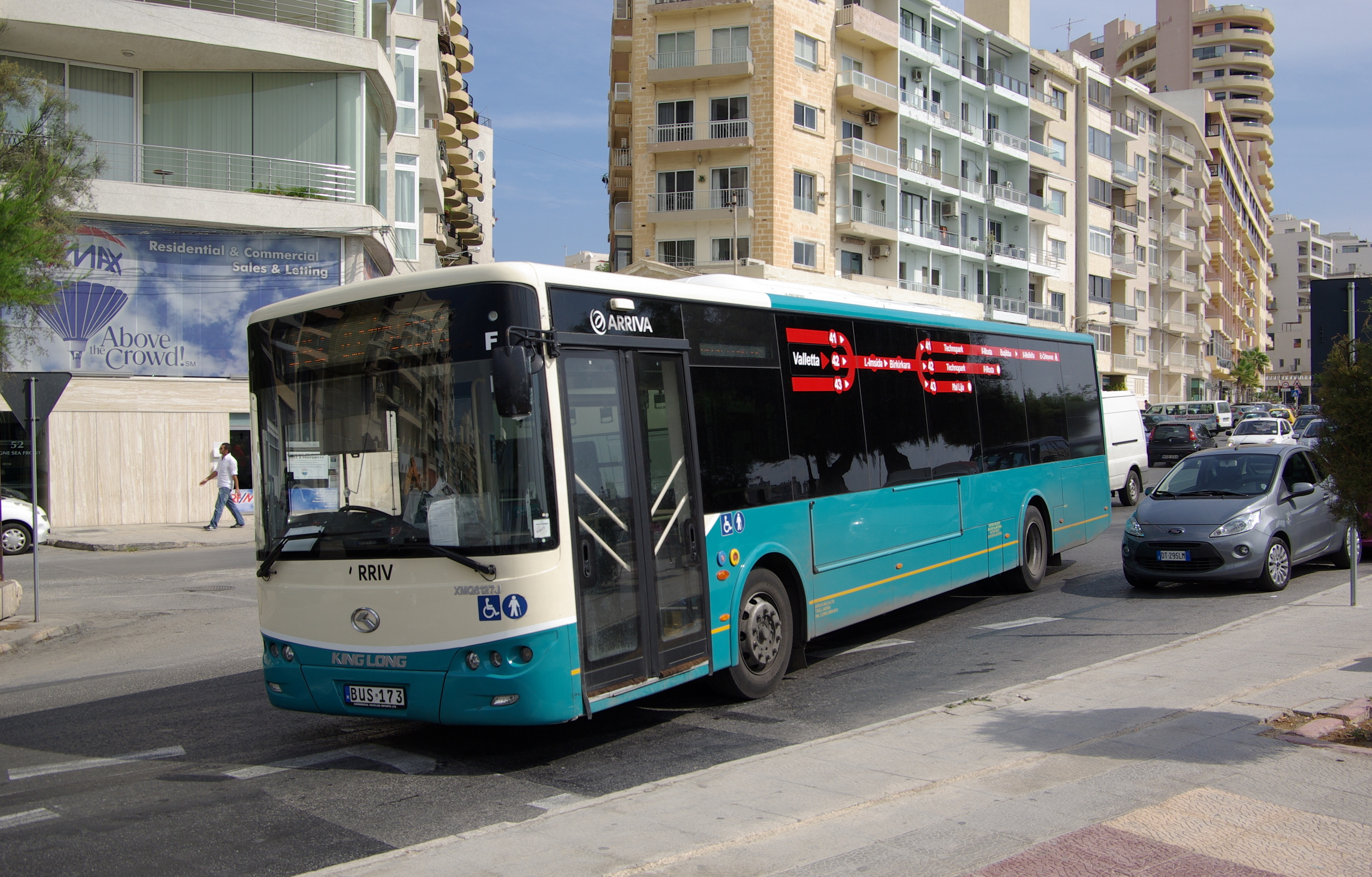
King Long Arriva Malta bus.

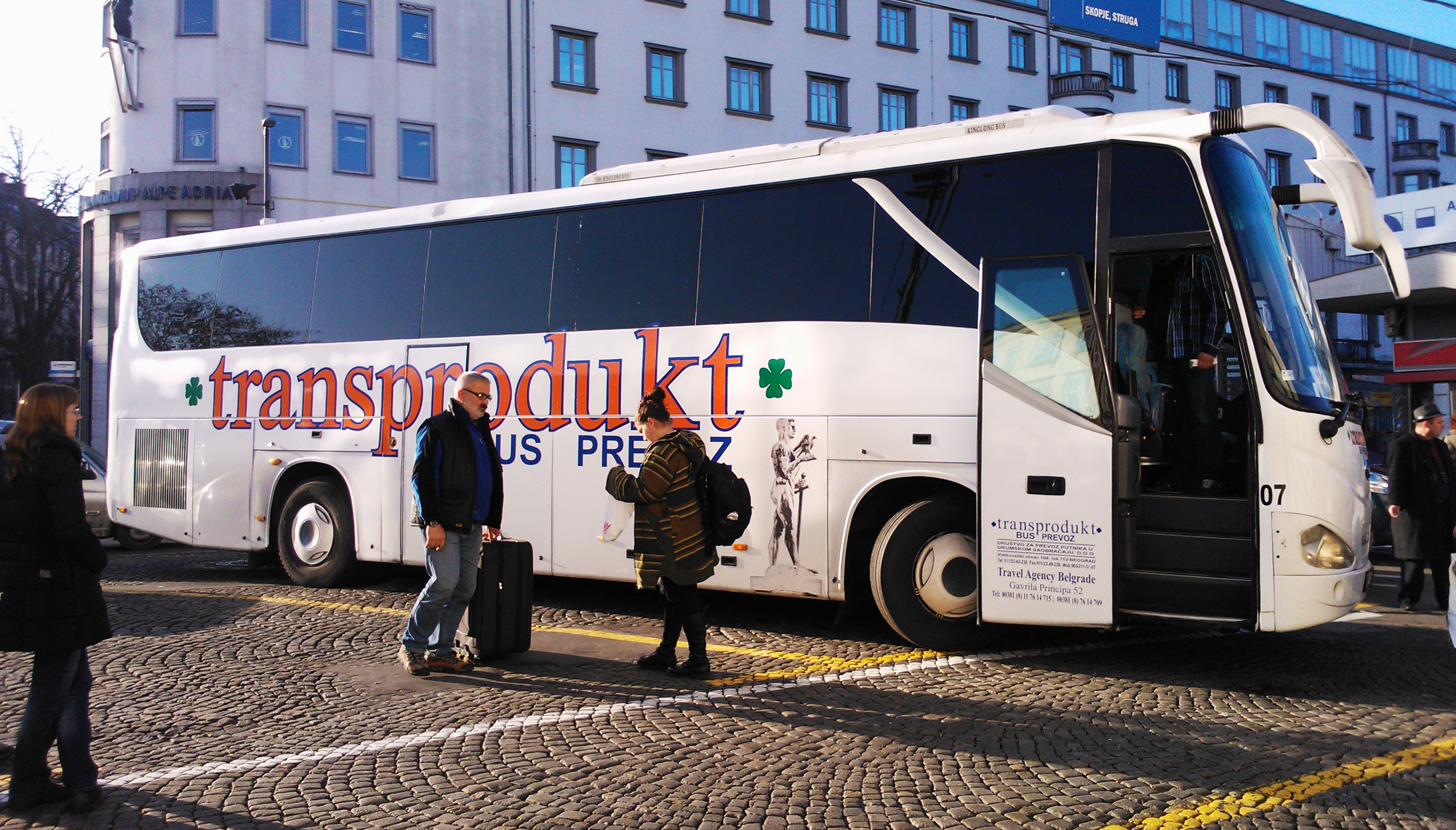
King Long long-distance bus covering central Europe destinations between Serbia and Slovenia.

King Long has taken a leading position among domestic coach manufacturers in China, the largest coach market in the world.

King Long currently offers 5 series of products, which are subdivided into 50-plus categories, covering various buses and coaches (6-13m), for the tourism, passenger transport and city bus market. The company's products are sold in overseas markets including Australia, Costa Rica, Chile, Bulgaria, Singapore, Philippines, Saudi Arabia, Israel, Iraq, Syria, Cyprus, Lebanon, Malta, the United States, the United Kingdom, Argentina, Barbados, Hong Kong, Hungary, Italy, Macau, Taiwan, Thailand, India, Malaysia, Indonesia, North Korea, Mexico, Sri Lanka and Pakistan.

At the end of 2004, the relocating and technology upgrading project of King Long was formally launched as one of the key projects of Fujian Province and Xiamen City in 2005. The new plant site is located in Xiamen Automobile Industry City in Guannan Industrial Park, Jimei District, Xiamen. The project was to be constructed in two phases: Phase 1 covers an area of 25 hectares with the gross building area of 8.5 hectares, with a designed yearly production capacity for 6,000 coaches and buses. With a total investment of about RMB260,000,000 yuan, Phase 1 was expected to be completed and put into use by the end of 2005. The reserved area for Phase 2 is 15-20 hectares. Upon completion, the new plant will become one of the largest coach manufacture bases in China with an annual output of 13,000 coaches and buses of large and medium sizes.

By 2008, King Long had an 18% share of the export market in China. Overseas sales contributed 25% of King Long's sales.

== Products ==
=== Pickups ===
- King Long Venus 3/Dracon

=== Vans ===
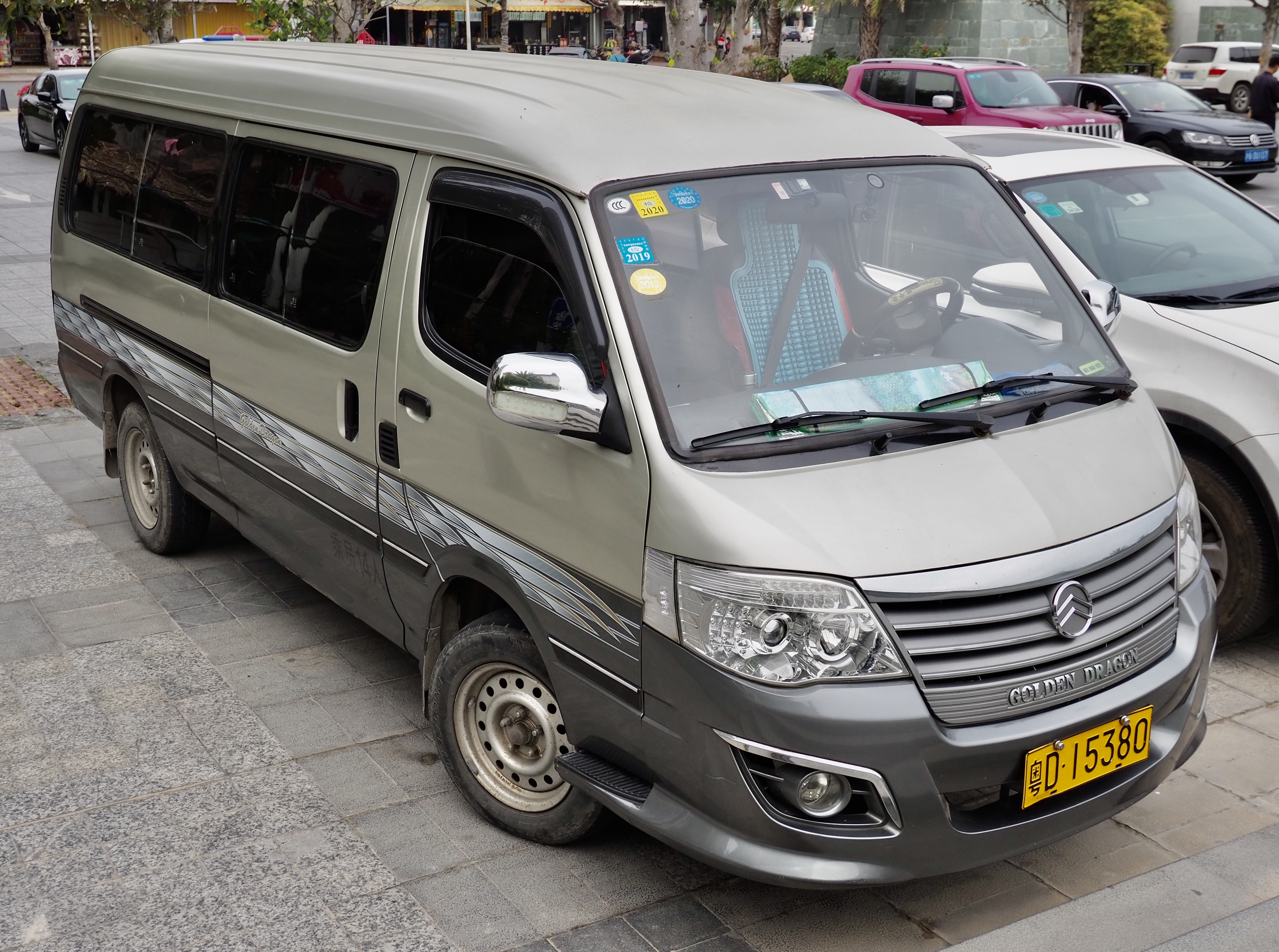
Golden Dragon XML6532J18

- King Long Jinwei
- King Long Kaige
- King Long Kairui
- King Long Jockey (King Long Saima)- A van heavily resembling the Mercedes-Benz Sprinter
- King Long Longyao 6
- King Long Longyao 6S
- King Long Longyao 8
- King Long Ambulance
- King Long Cargo Van
- King Long Forest Fire Van
- King Long Mini Van
- King Long Police Van
- King Long Postal Van

=== Coaches ===
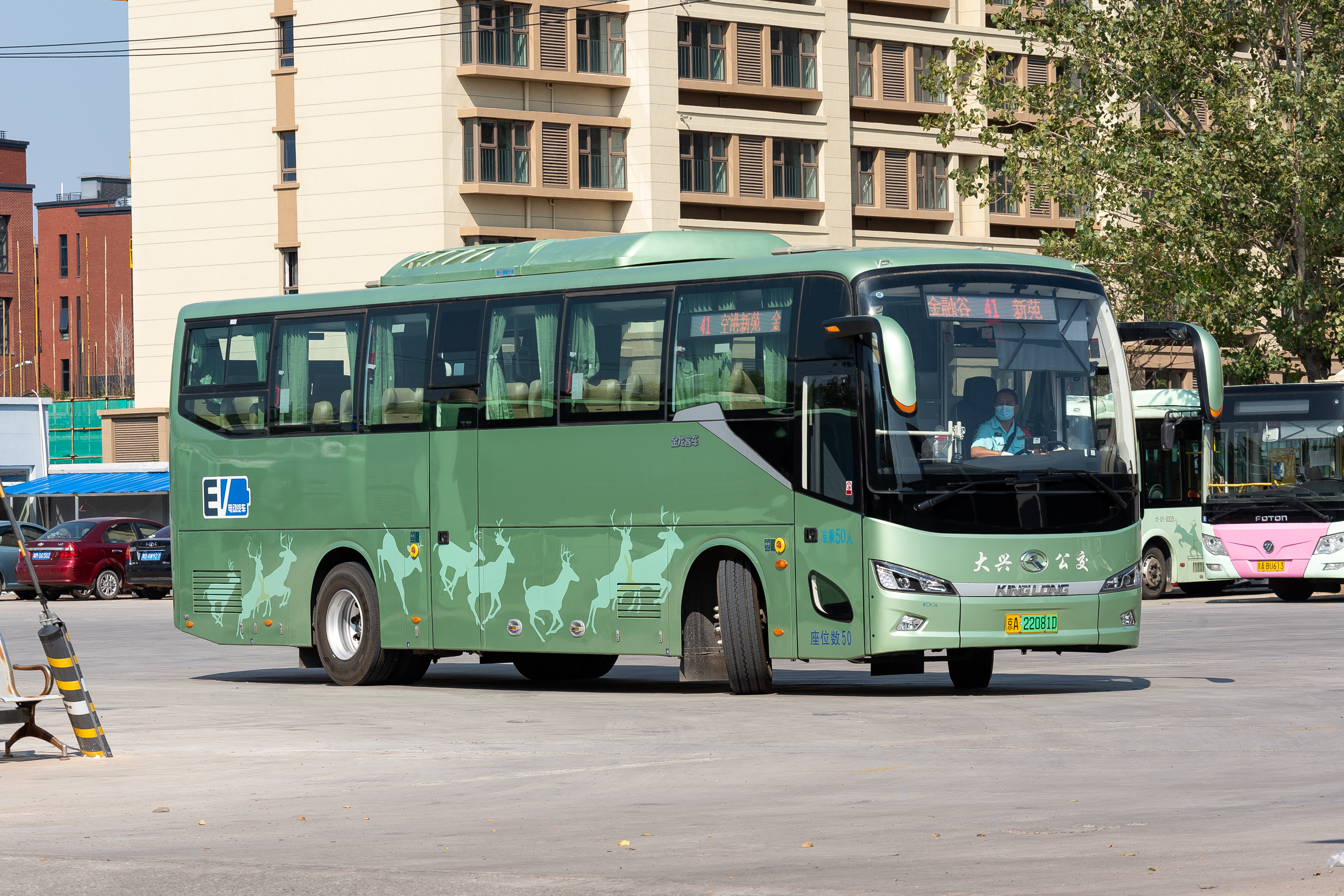
King Long XMQ6112AGBEVL3 in Daxing Bus service

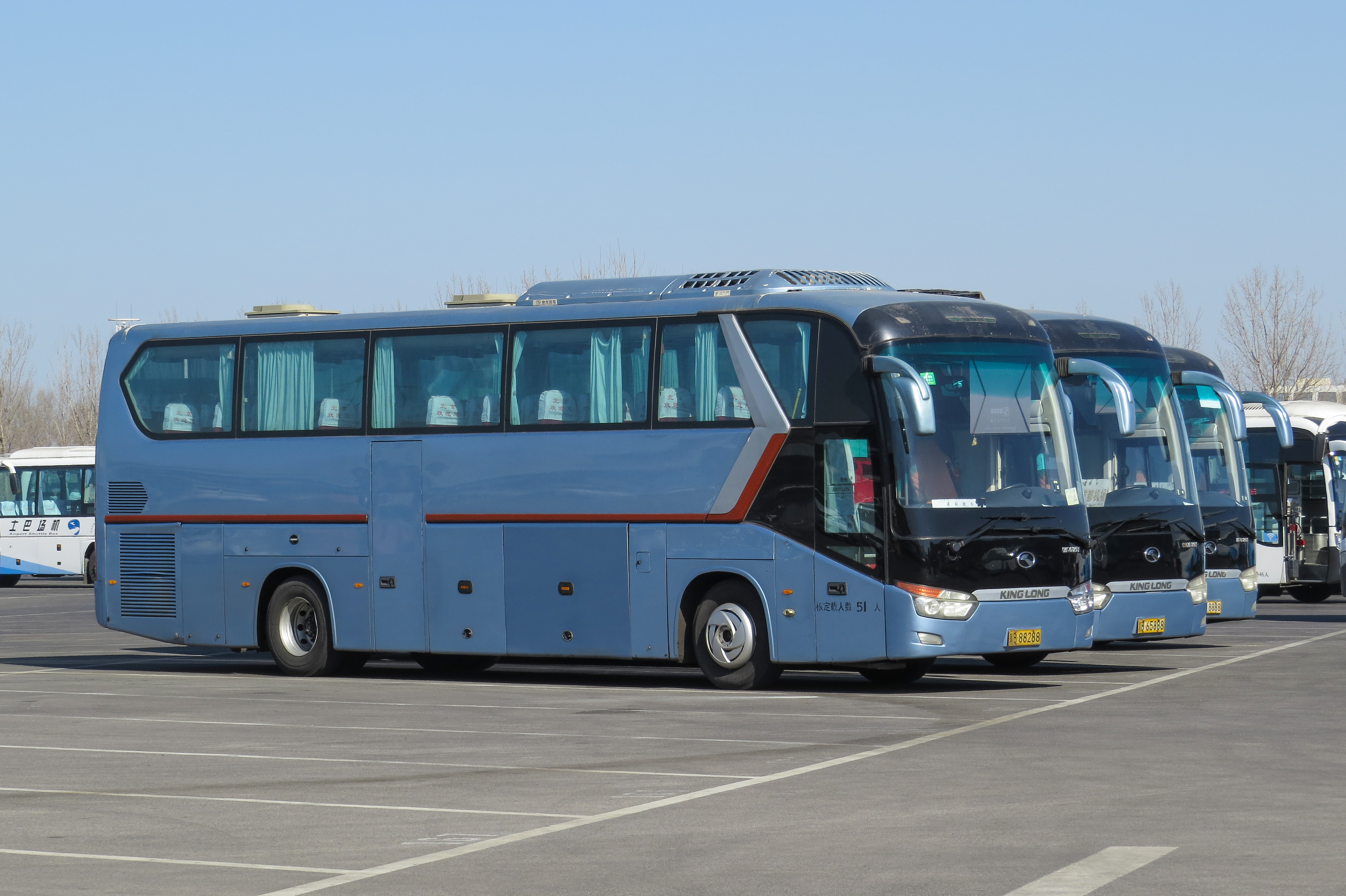
three XMQ6129Ys in the parking lot of Beijing Capital International Airport

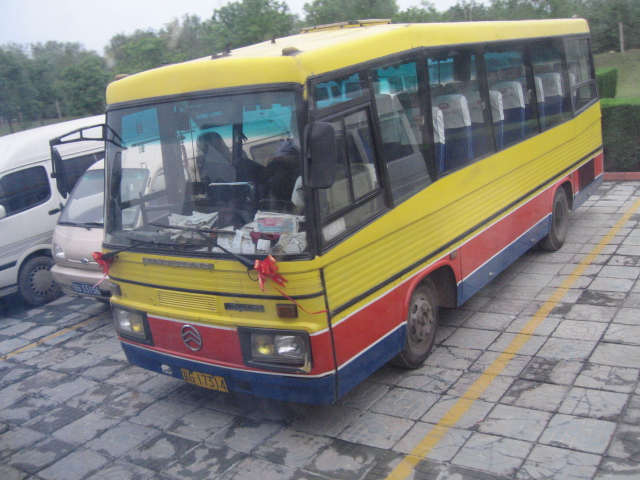
XMQ6702B was one of the early models of King Long in the 1990s

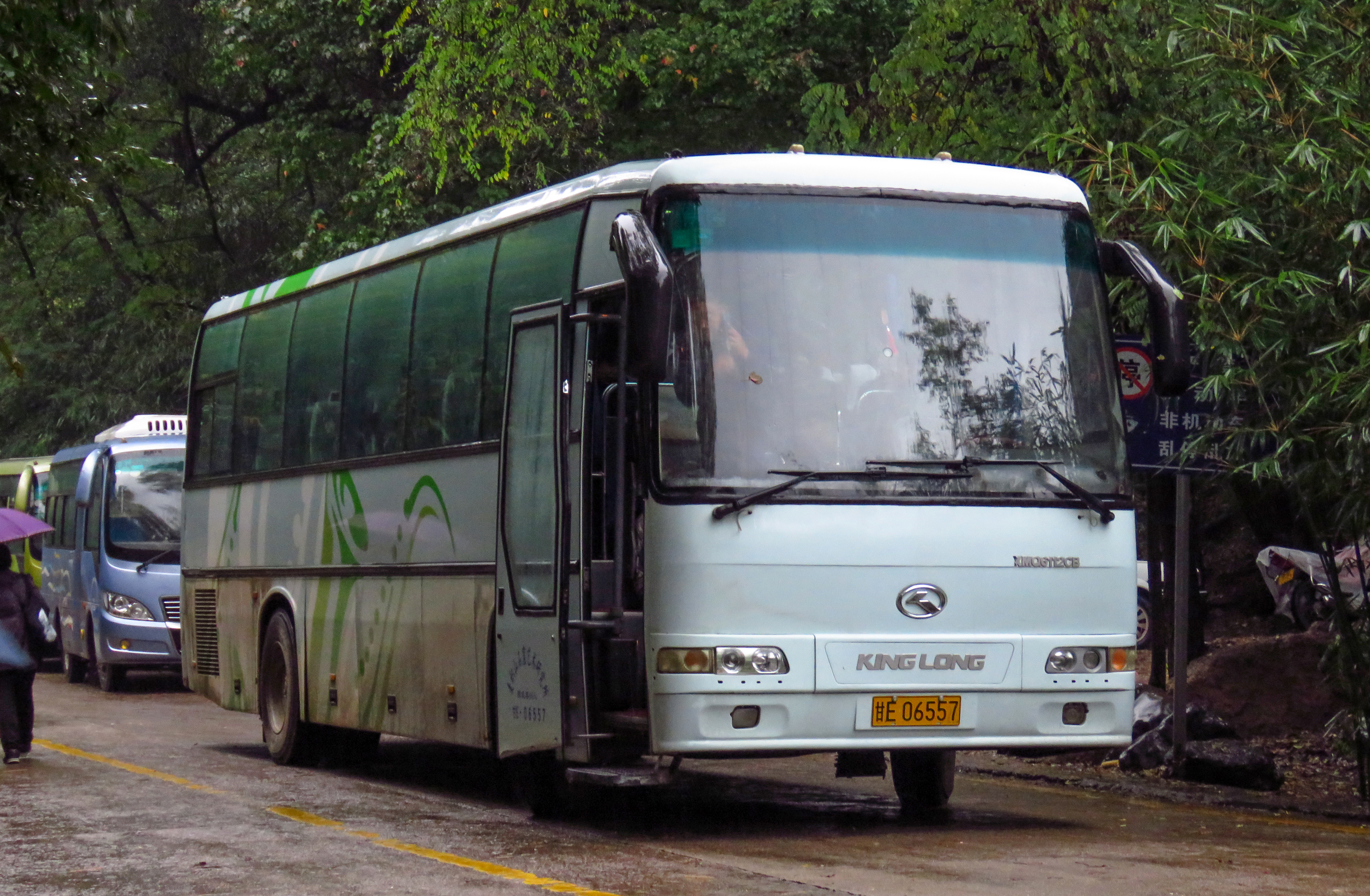
XMQ6112 series started production in 1999

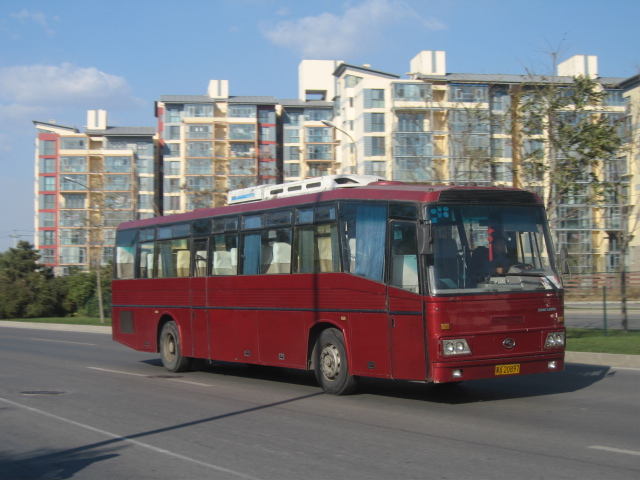
XMQ6120 with MAN 16.290 chassis

- King Long XML6118G
- King Long XMQ6101Y
- King Long XMQ6111Y
- King Long XMQ6111CY
- King Long XMQ6116Y
- King Long XMQ6117Y
- King Long XMQ6117Y3
- King Long XMQ6118JB
- King Long XMQ6118Y
- King Long XMQ6119
- King Long XMQ6119T
- King Long XMQ6120P
- King Long XMQ6122 - 12 m coach
- King Long XMQ6126
- King Long XMQ6126Y
- King Long XMQ6127 - 12 m coach
- King Long XMQ6127Y - 12 m coach
- King Long XMQ6128Y
- King Long XMQ6129P
- King Long XMQ6129P8
- King Long XMQ6129Y - 12 m coach, Edison Smart 12 in South Korea.
- King Long XMQ6129Y2 - 12 m coach
- King Long XMQ6129Y5 - 12 m coach
- King Long XMQ6125AY - 12 m coach
- King Long XMQ6130Y
- King Long XMQ6133Y (King Long MAN)
- King Long XMQ6140P
- King Long XMQ6140Y
- King Long XMQ6140Y8
- King Long XMQ6606
- King Long XMQ6608
- King Long XMQ6660
- King Long XMQ6752
- King Long XMQ6798Y
- King Long XMQ6800Y
- King Long XMQ6802Y
- King Long XMQ6871CY
- King Long XMQ6858Y
- King Long XMQ6859Y
- King Long XMQ6886Y
- King Long XMQ6895Y
- King Long XMQ6898Y
- King Long XMQ6900Y
- King Long XMQ6930K
- King Long XMQ6960Y
- King Long XMQ6996Y
- King Long XMQ6996K

=== School bus ===
- King Long XMQ6100ASN
- King Long XMQ6660ASD
- King Long XMQ6660XC
- King Long XMQ6730ASD
- King Long XMQ6802ASD
- King Long XMQ6900BSD
- King Long XMQ6998ASD

=== Transit bus ===
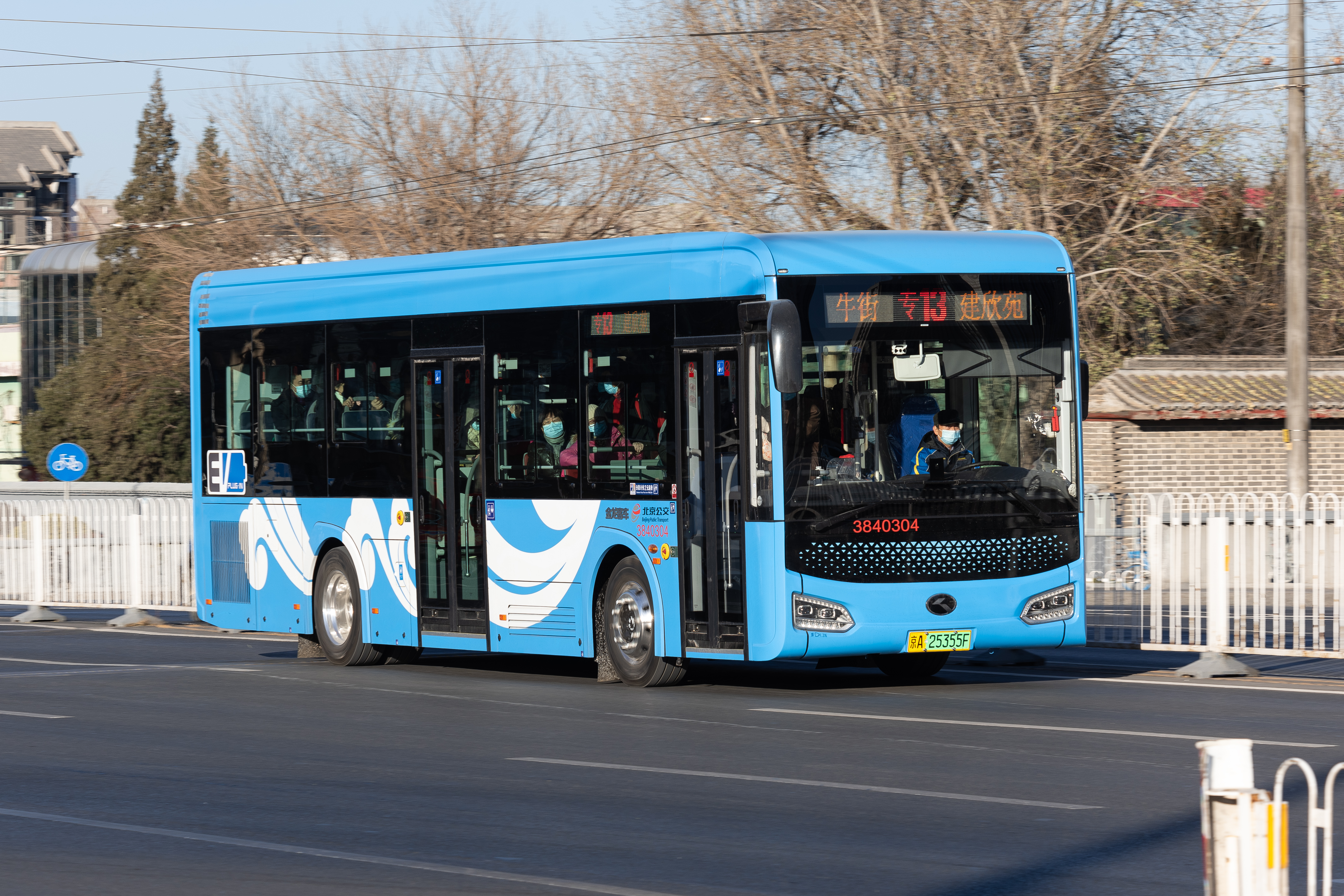
A King Long XMQ6106AGSHEVD62 plug-in hybrid bus on Taoran Bridge, Beijing

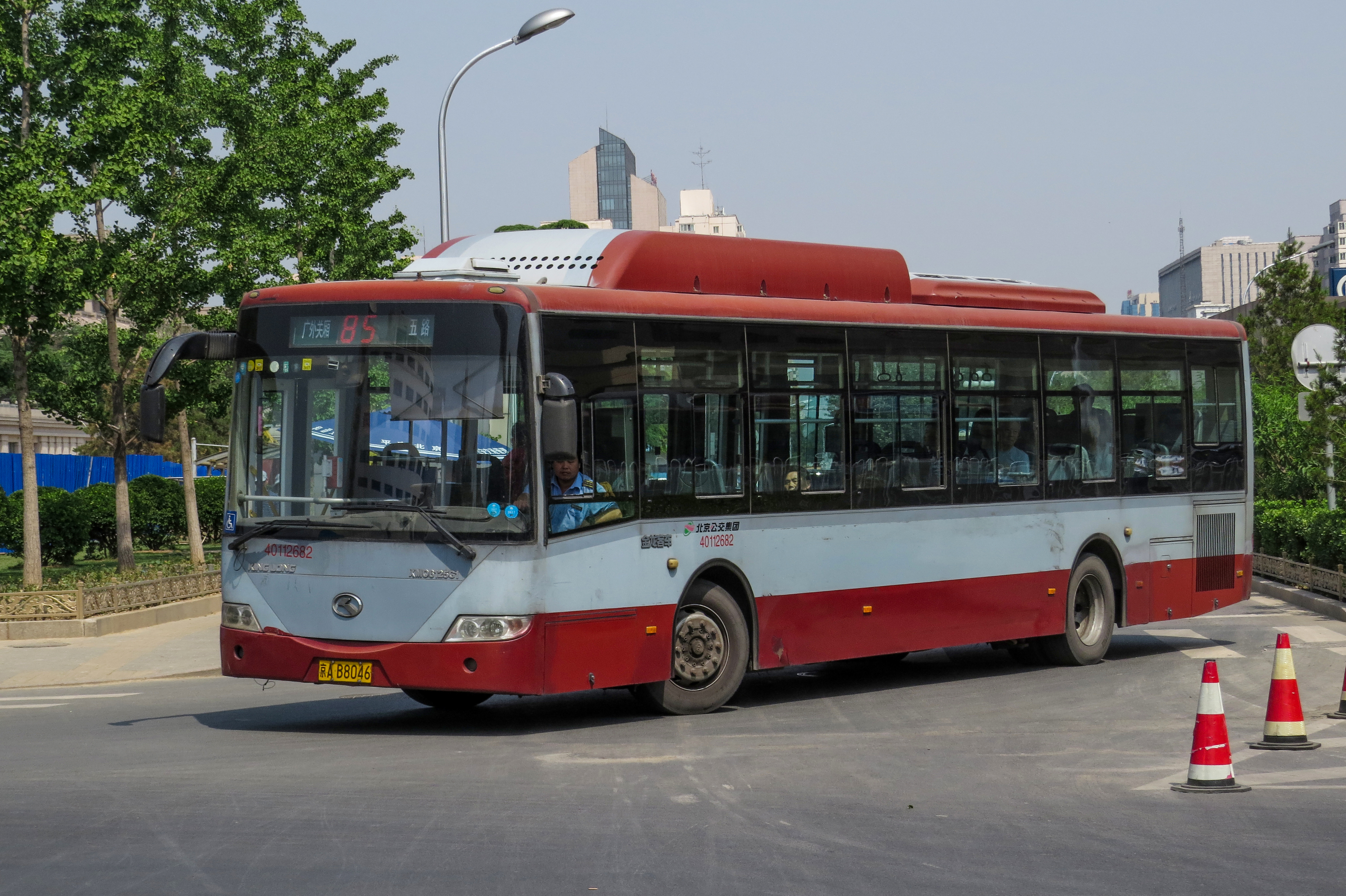
A King Long XMQ6125G1 turning from Fuxing Road to Junbo West Road, Beijing

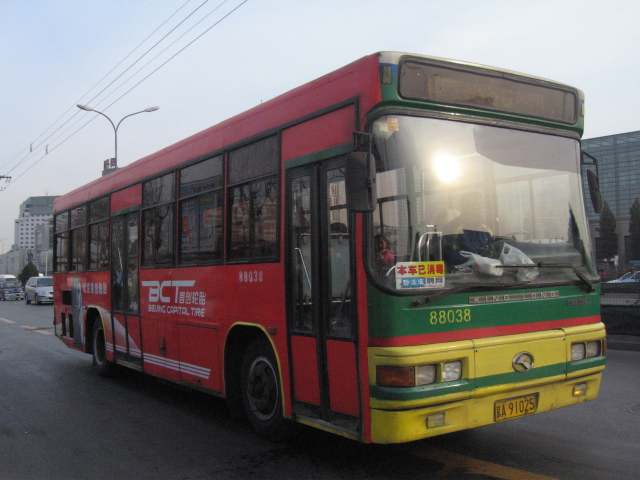
XMQ6100SL, an early model of King Long, near Beijing Zoo

- King Long XMQ6105G
- King Long XMQ6106G
- King Long XMQ6106AGHEV1
- King Long XMQ6106AGBEVM2
- King Long XMQ6106AGBEVL31
- King Long XMQ6110GS
- King Long XMQ6111GS
- King Long XMQ6116G
- King Long XMQ6118G
- King Long XMQ6119G
- King Long XMQ6121G
- King Long XMQ6125G
- King Long XMQ6125G1
- King Long XMQ6127AGBEV3
- King Long XMQ6127G
- King Long XMQ6127GH1
- King Long XMQ6127GH5
- King Long XMQ6127GHEV4
- King Long XMQ6127J
- King Long XMQ6140ABD
- King Long XMQ6140G
- King Long XMQ6141G
- King Long XMQ6180G
- King Long XMQ6180G1
- King Long XMQ6180GK
- King Long XMQ6181G
- King Long XMQ6770AGD3
- King Long XMQ6800G
- King Long XMQ6801G
- King Long XMQ6840G
- King Long XMQ6840G2
- King Long XMQ6841G
- King Long XMQ6850G
- King Long XMQ6891G
- King Long XMQ6891G1
- King Long XMQ6892G
- King Long XMQ6900G
- King Long XMQ6901G
- King Long XMQ6925G
- King Long XMQ6930G

=== City Bus ===
- King Long XMQ6120 AGD5
- King Long XMQ6121G

=== Other ===
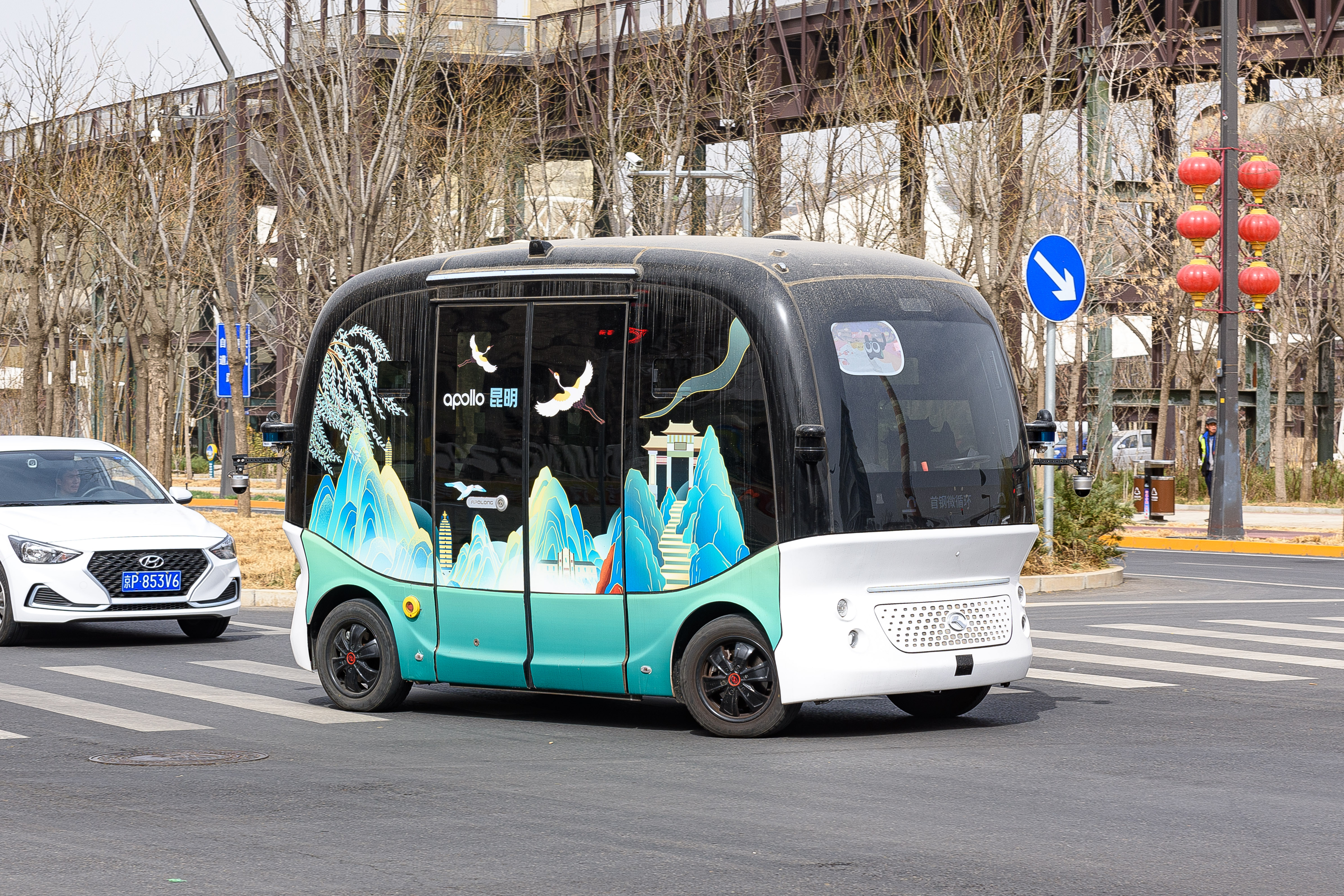
A King Long Apolong at Shougang Park, Beijing, China

- King Long Airport Bus 6139B
- King Long XMQ6886 - 9 m Midibus
- Apolong unmanned minibus

== Image gallery ==
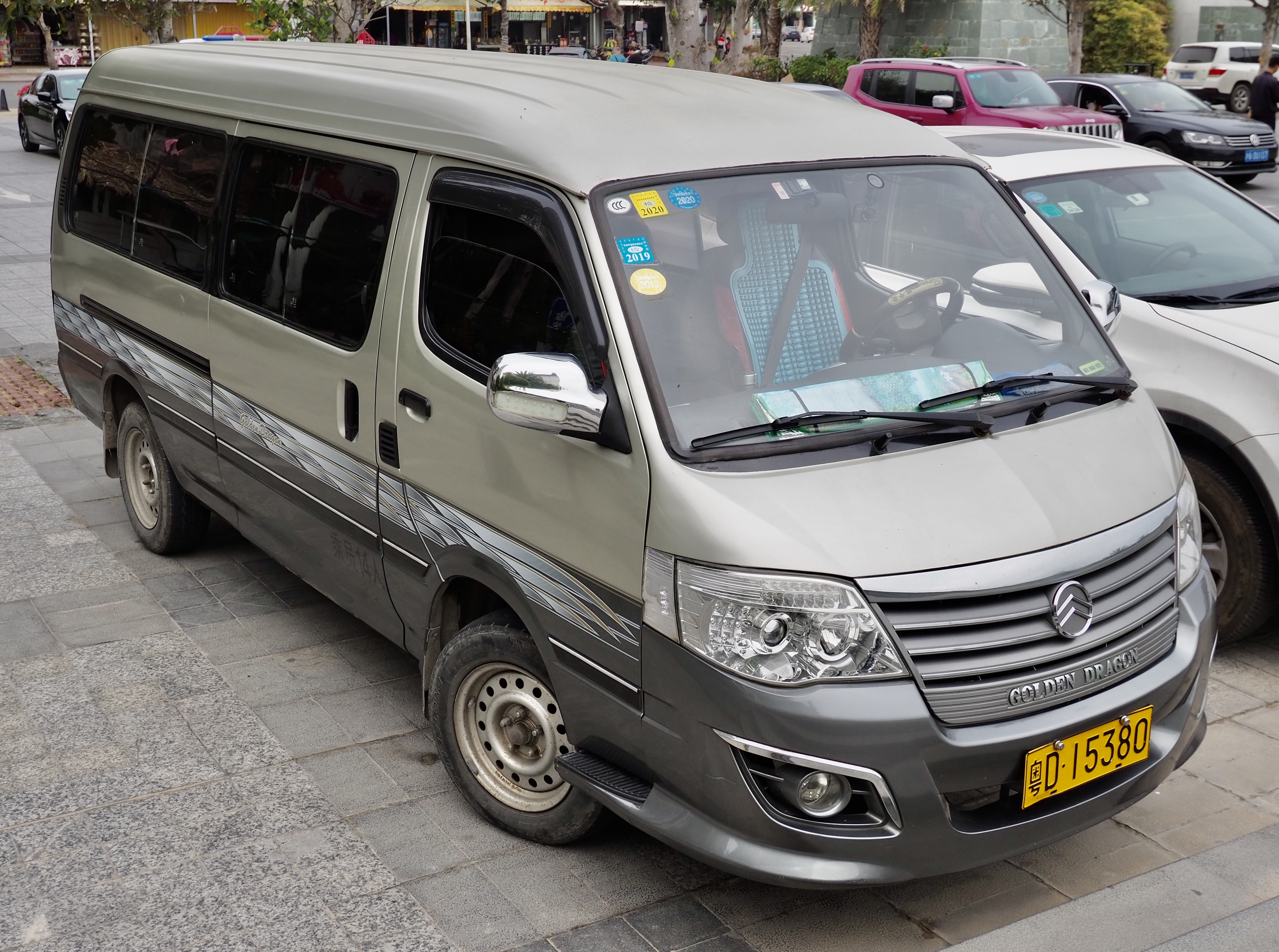
King Long Jinwei

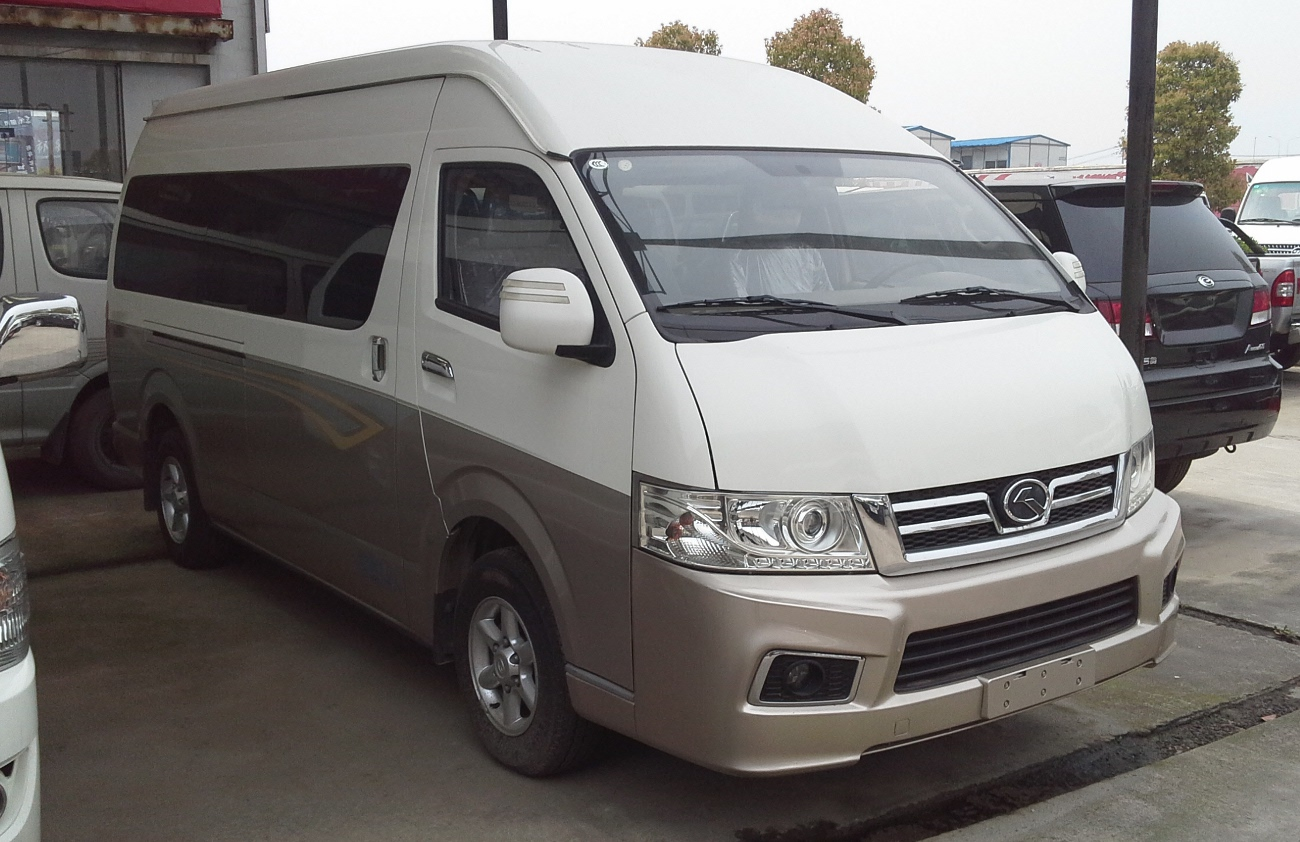
King Long Kaige

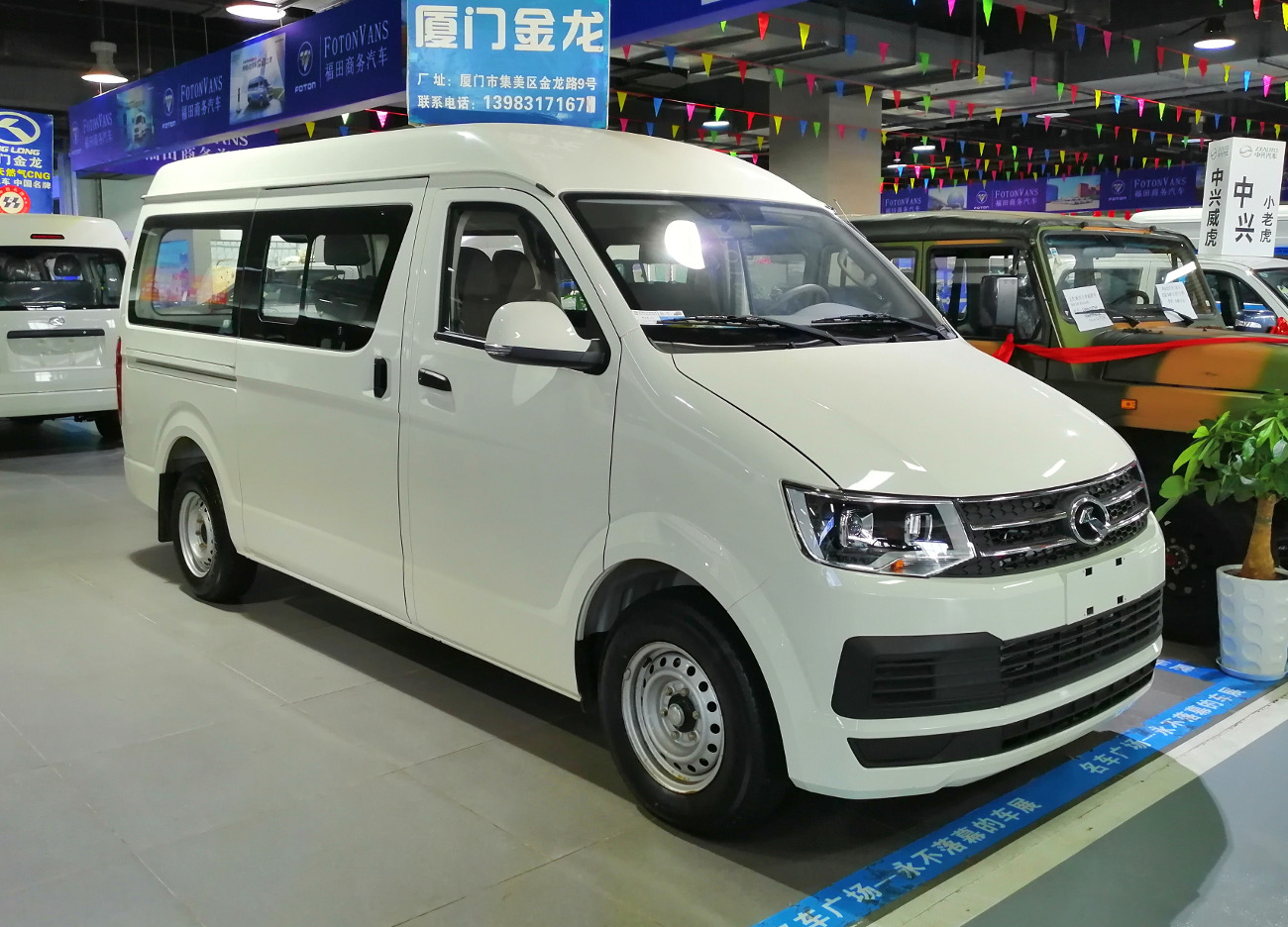
King Long Kairui

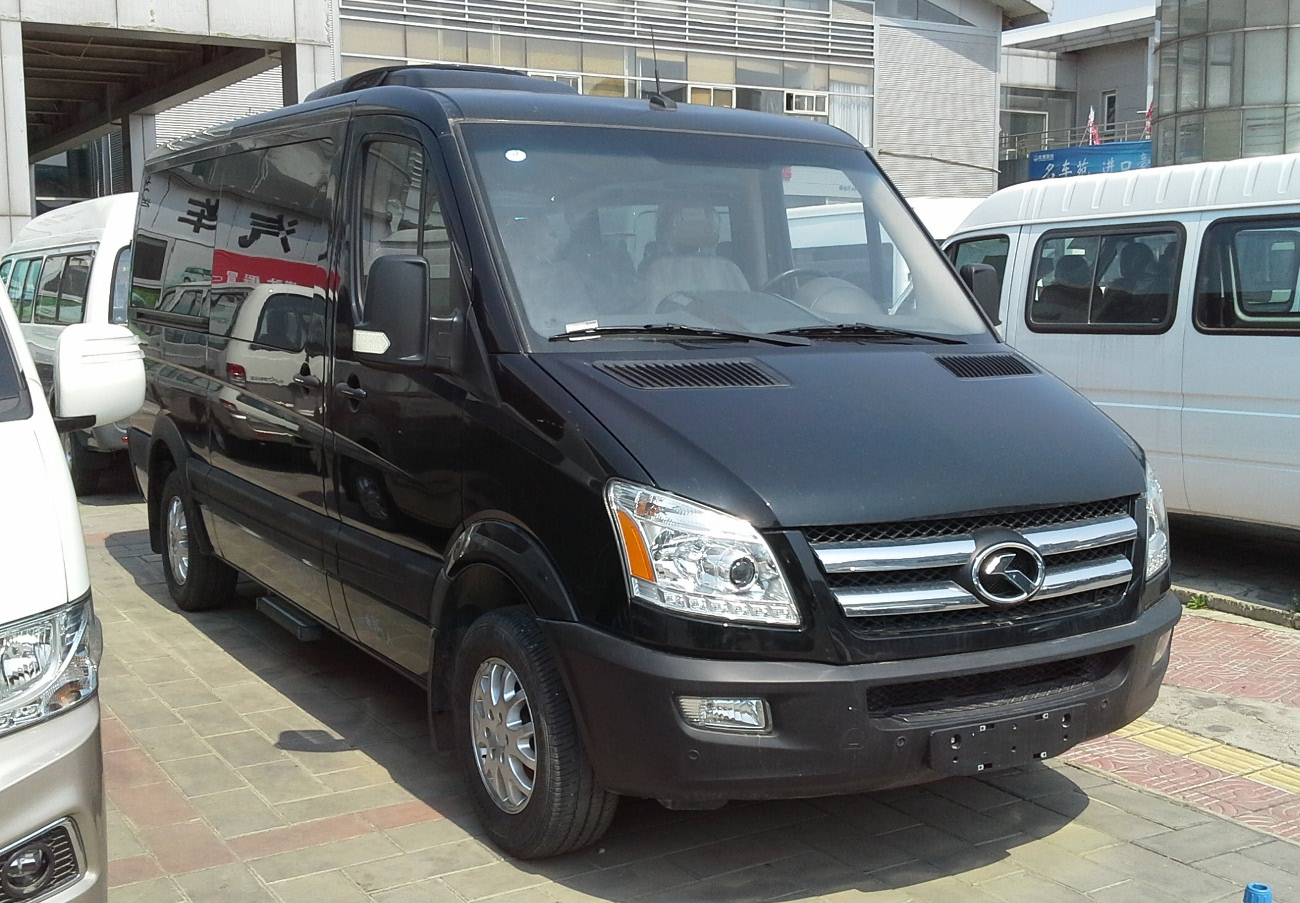
King Long Jockey

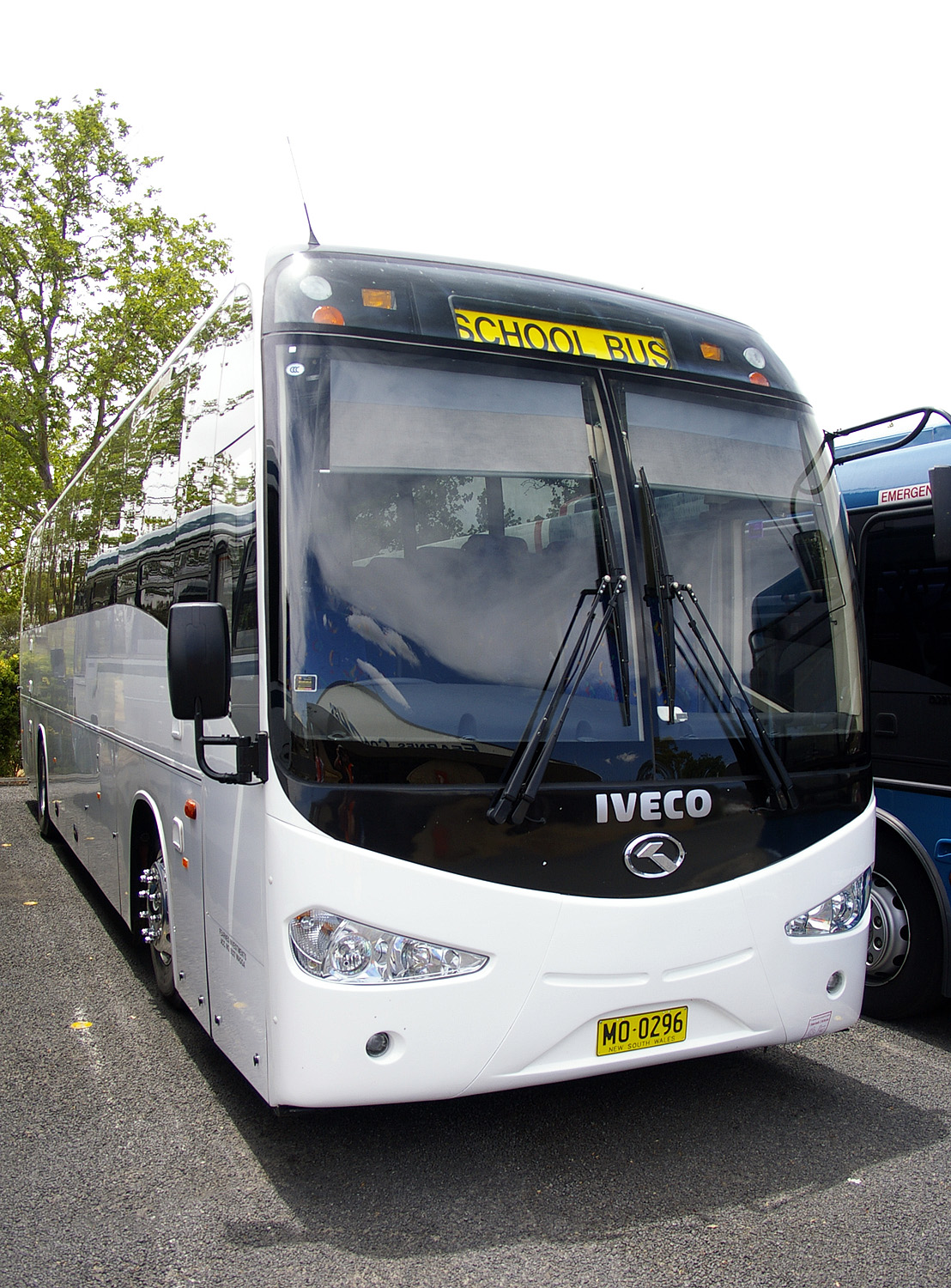
King Long with Iveco branding.

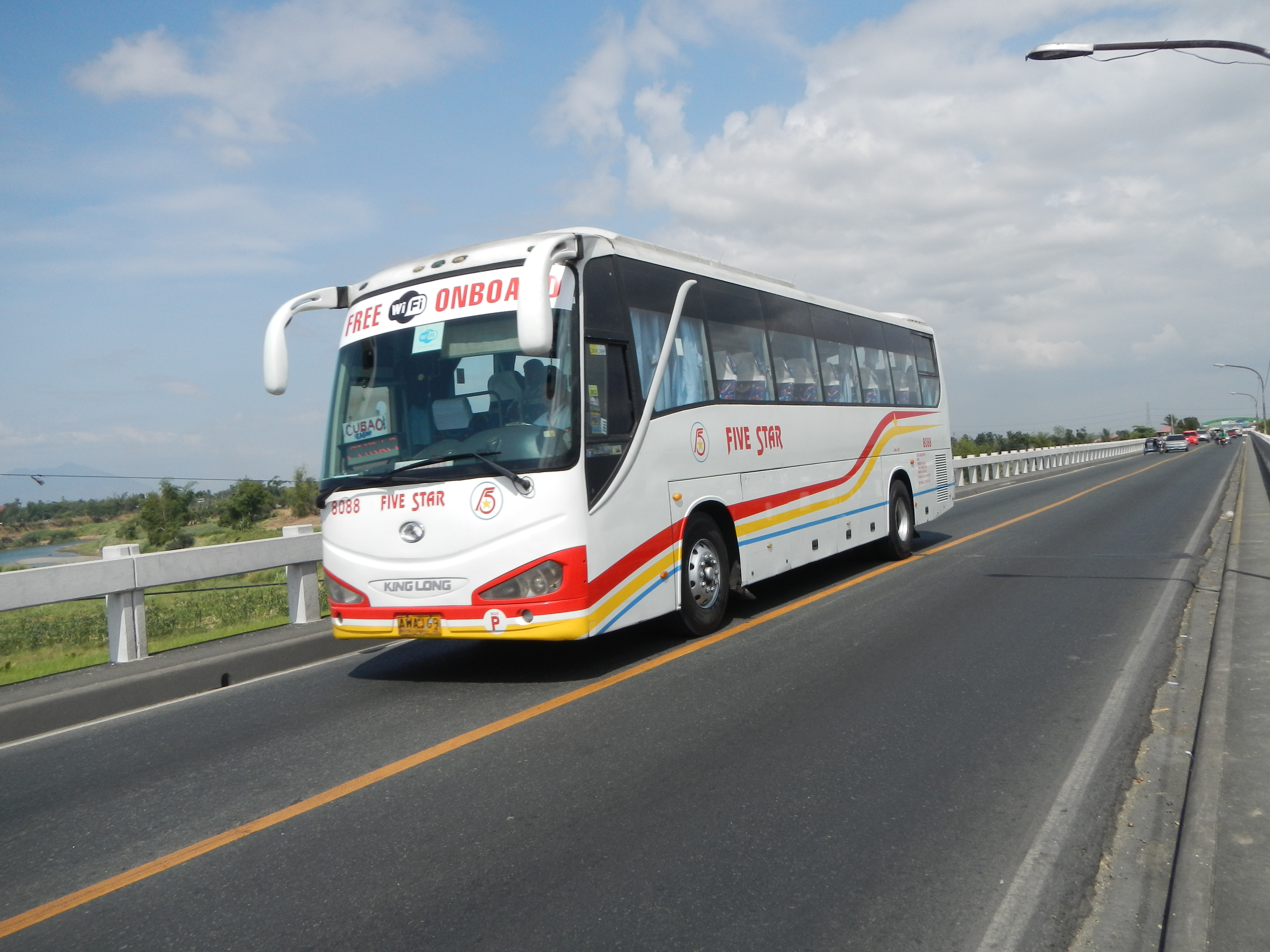
King Long XMQ6118JB

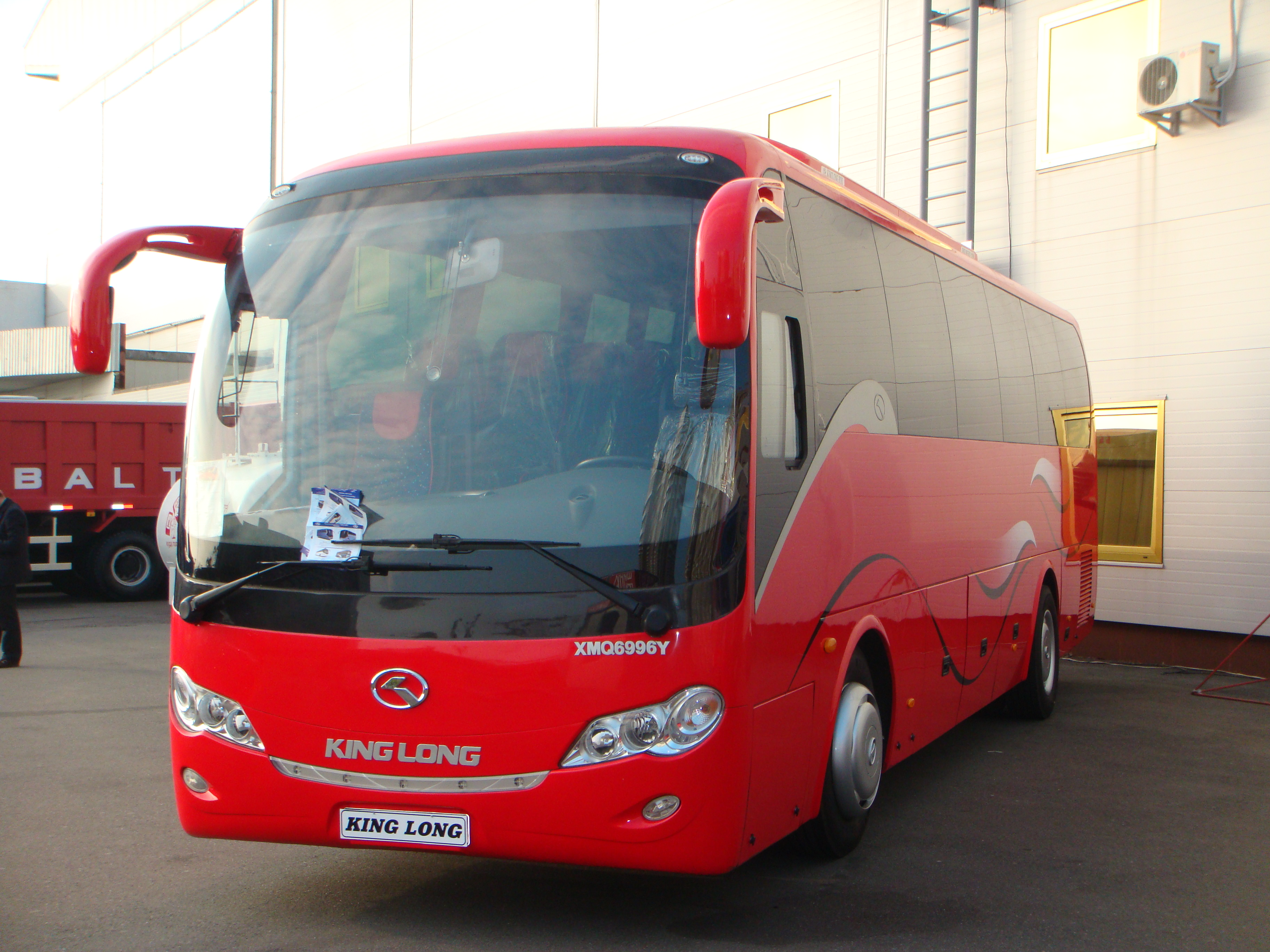
King Long XMQ6996Y

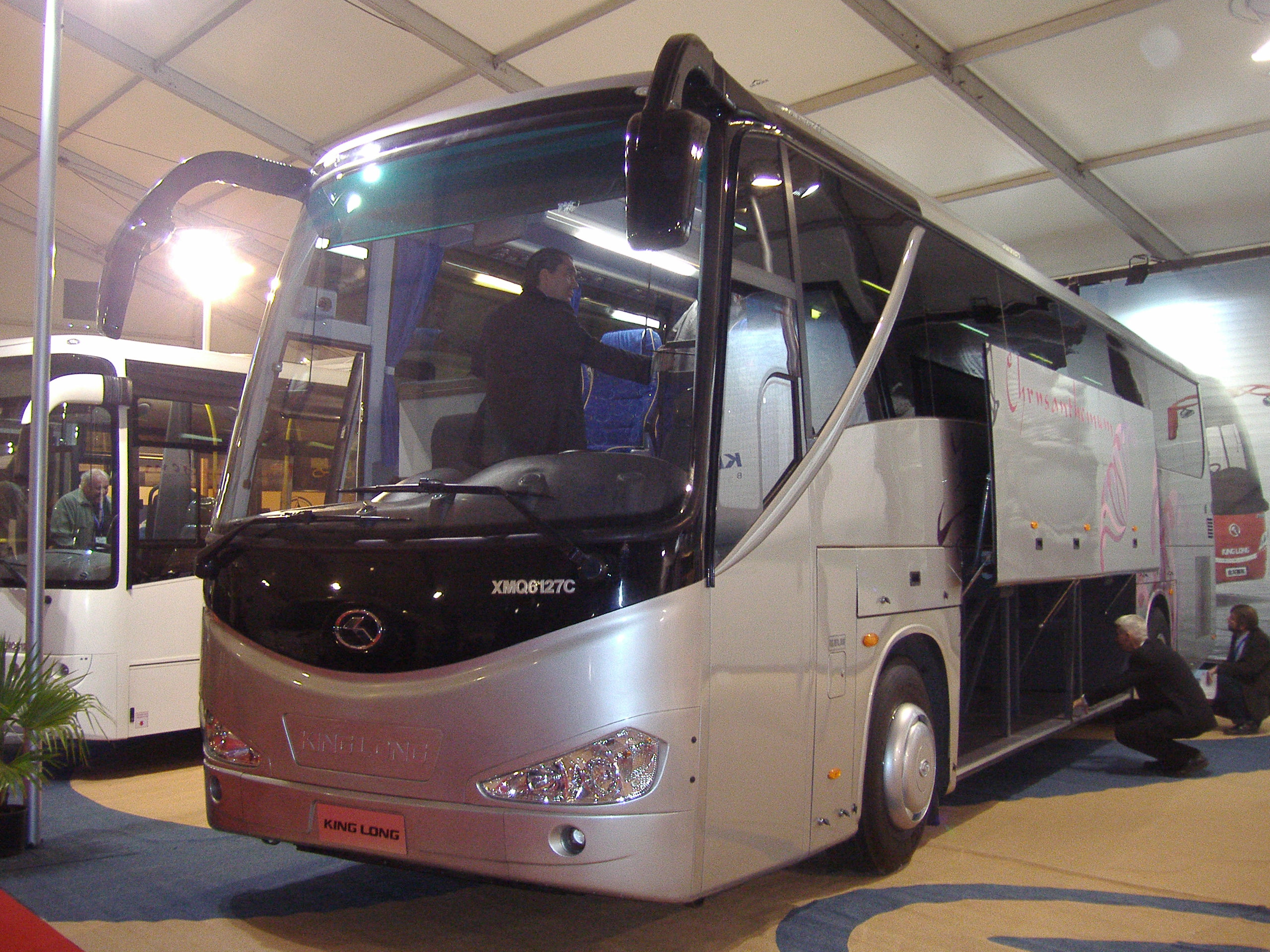
King Long XMQ6127C

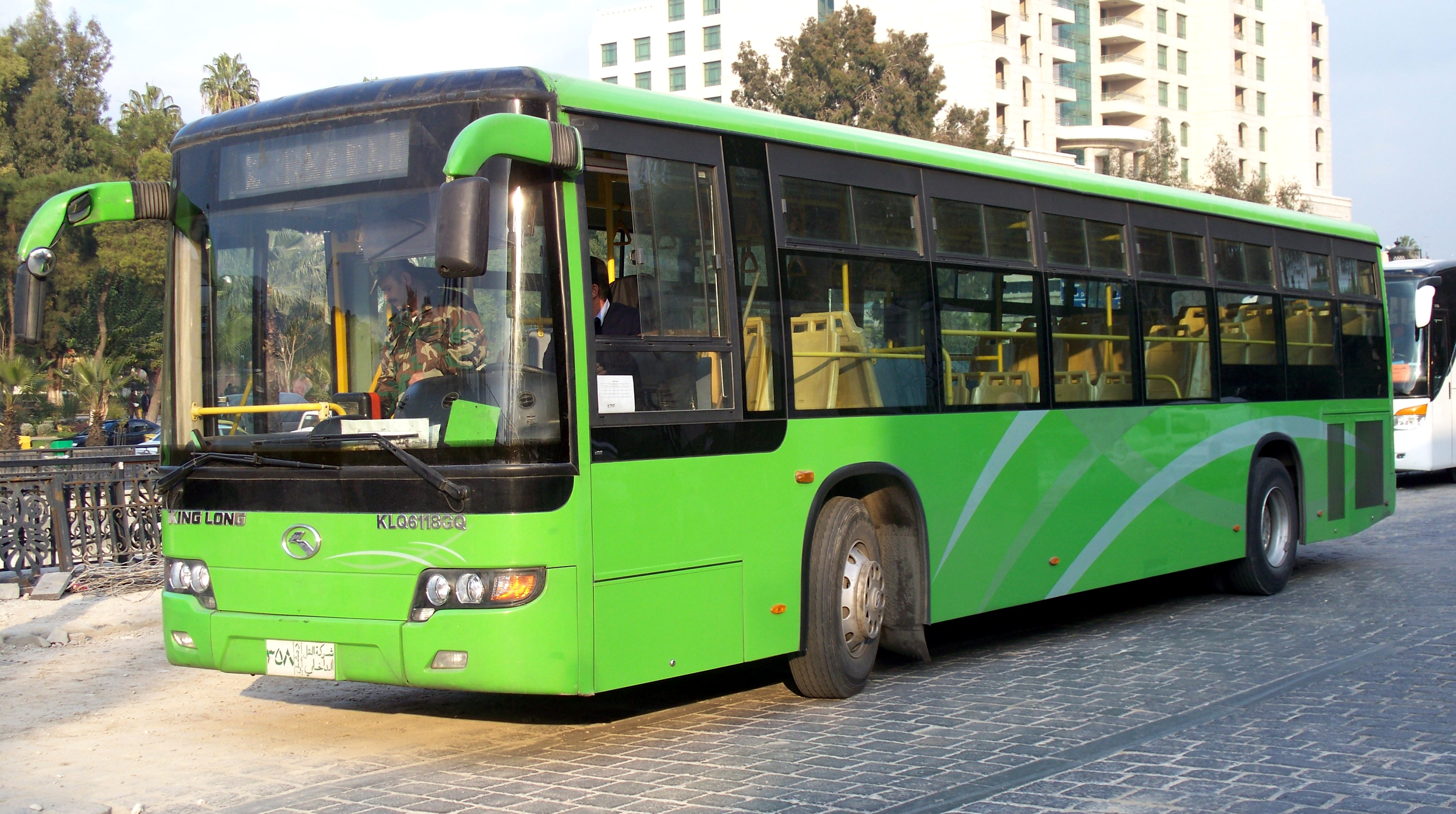
King Long KLQ6118GQ bus in Damascus, Syria

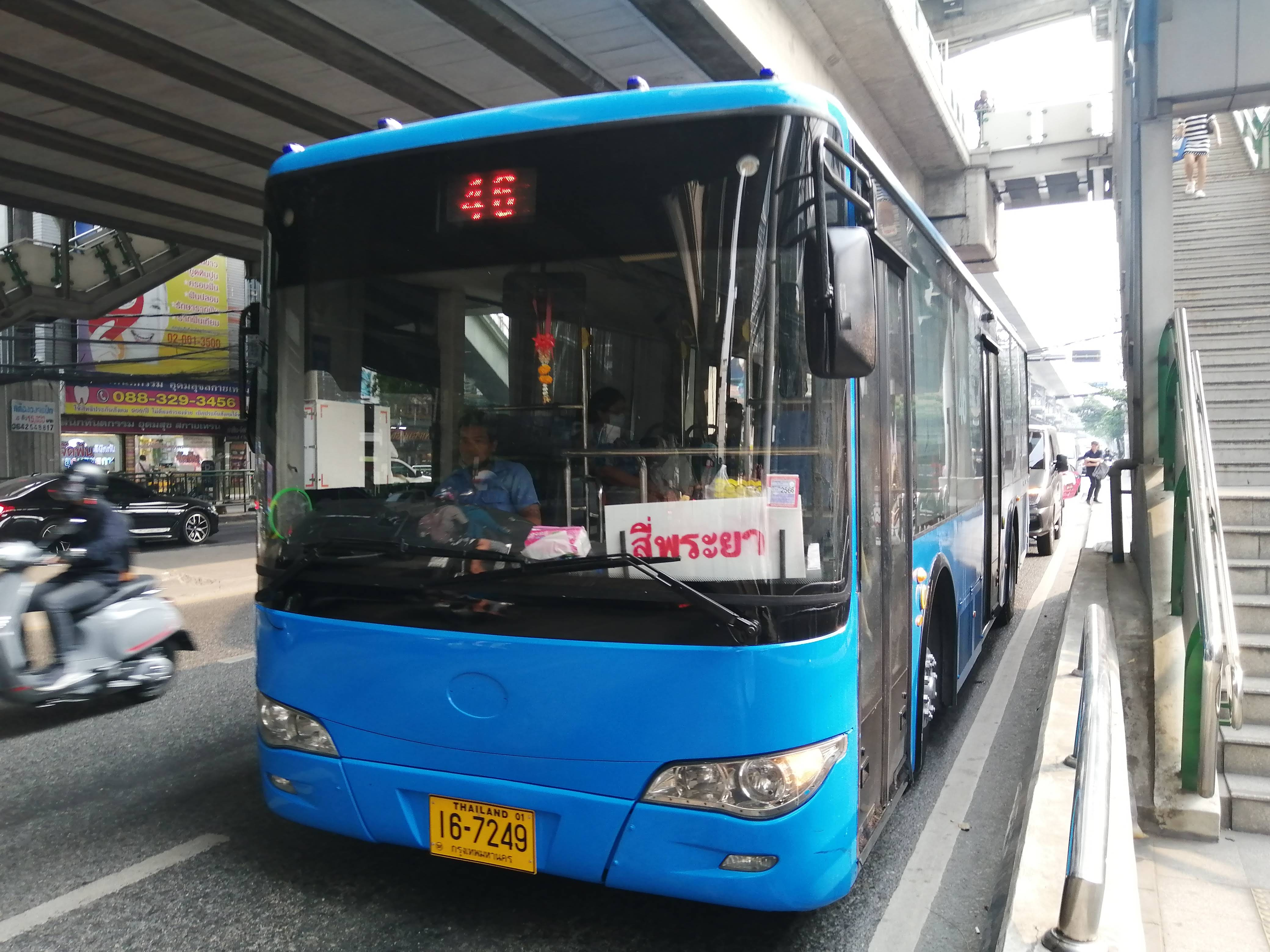
King Long XMQ6106CNG bus in Bangkok, Thailand
