= Kuayue Kuayuexing =

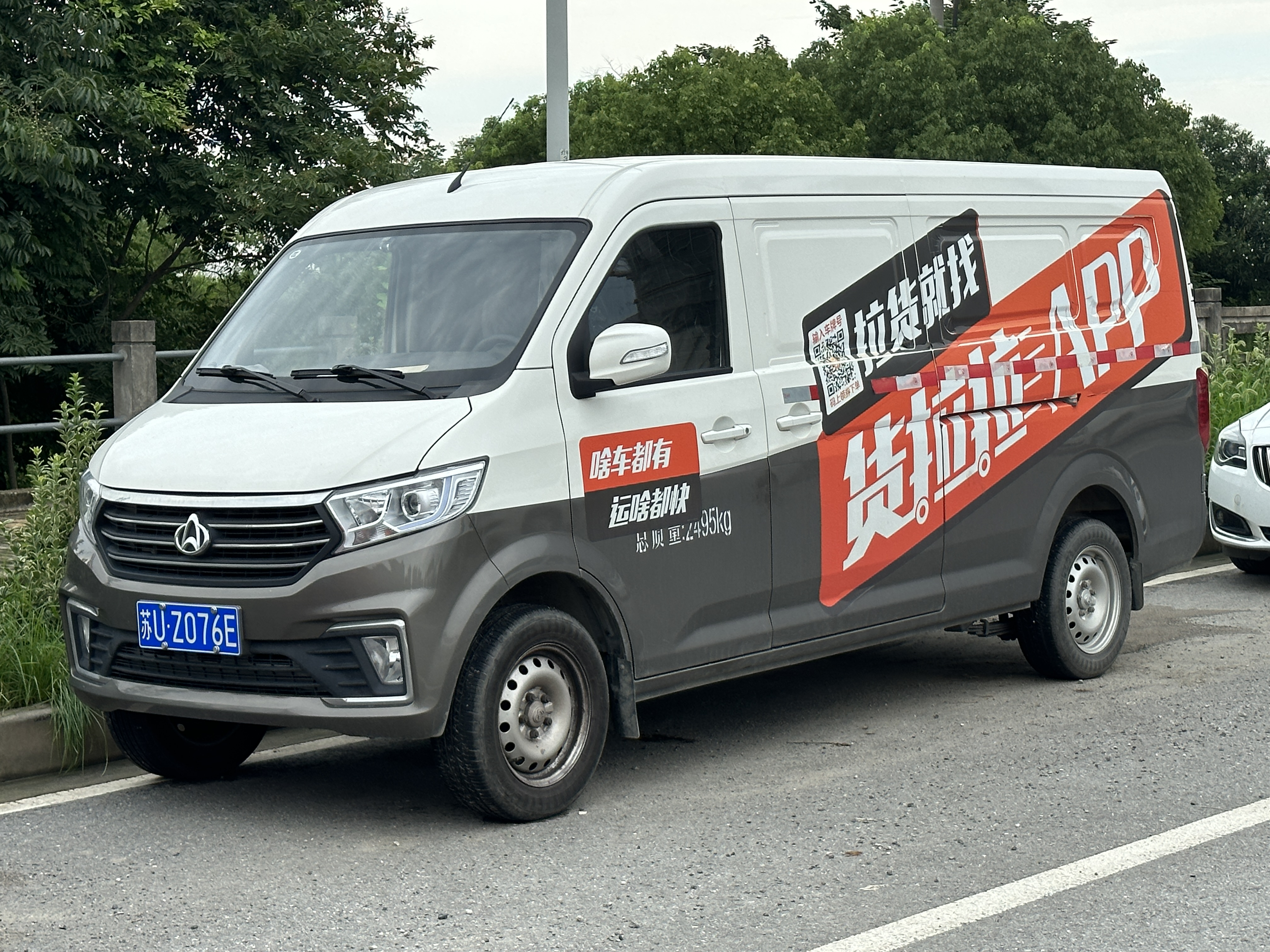
- Kuayue Kuayuexing V7

Overview
- Manufacturer: Changan Kuayue
- Also called: Kuayue Kuayuexing V3/V5/V7; King Long Longyao 6S; Forland Safari (Pakistan); Thaco TF420V/TF450V/TF480V (Vietnam)
- Production: 2021–present
- Assembly: China

Body and chassis
- Class: Microvan
- Body style: 5-door van; 6-door van
- Layout: Mid-engine, rear-wheel-drive

Powertrain
- Engine: 1.5 L I4 petrol (Kuayuexing V3/V5); 1.6 L I4 petrol (Kuayuexing V7)
- Transmission: 5-speed manual

Dimensions
- Wheelbase: 2,700 mm (106.3 in) (Kuayuexing V3); 2,930 mm (115.4 in) (Kuayuexing V5/V5 EV); 3,135 mm (123.4 in) (Kuayuexing V7/V7 EV)
- Length: 4,200 mm (165.4 in) (Kuayuexing V3); 4,495 mm (177.0 in) (Kuayuexing V5/V5 EV); 4,800 mm (189.0 in) (Kuayuexing V7/V7 EV)
- Width: 1,680 mm (66.1 in)
- Height: 1,965 mm (77.4 in) (Kuayuexing V3); 1,990 mm (78.3 in) (Kuayuexing V5/V5 EV/V7/V7 EV)

The Kuayue Kuayuexing (Chinese: 长安跨越 长安跨越星) is a series microvan produced by Chongqing Kuayue Automobile Co., Ltd of Changan Automobile under the Kuayue sub-brand.

== Overview ==
The Kuayuexing vans were launched in September 2021. The model line is available in 3 different sizes, starting with the Kuayuexing V3 as the base model, the Kuayuexing V5 and V5 NEV as the midsize variant, and the Kuayuexing V7 and V7 EV as the largest variant.

The Kuayuexing V3 and V5 is powered by a 107 hp (78.5 kW) 1.5 liter naturally aspirated engine with 140 to 141Nm of torque mated to a 5-speed manual transmission. The Kuayuexing V7 is powered by a 122 hp (90 kW) 1.6 liter naturally aspirated engine with 158Nm of torque mated to a 5-speed manual transmission.

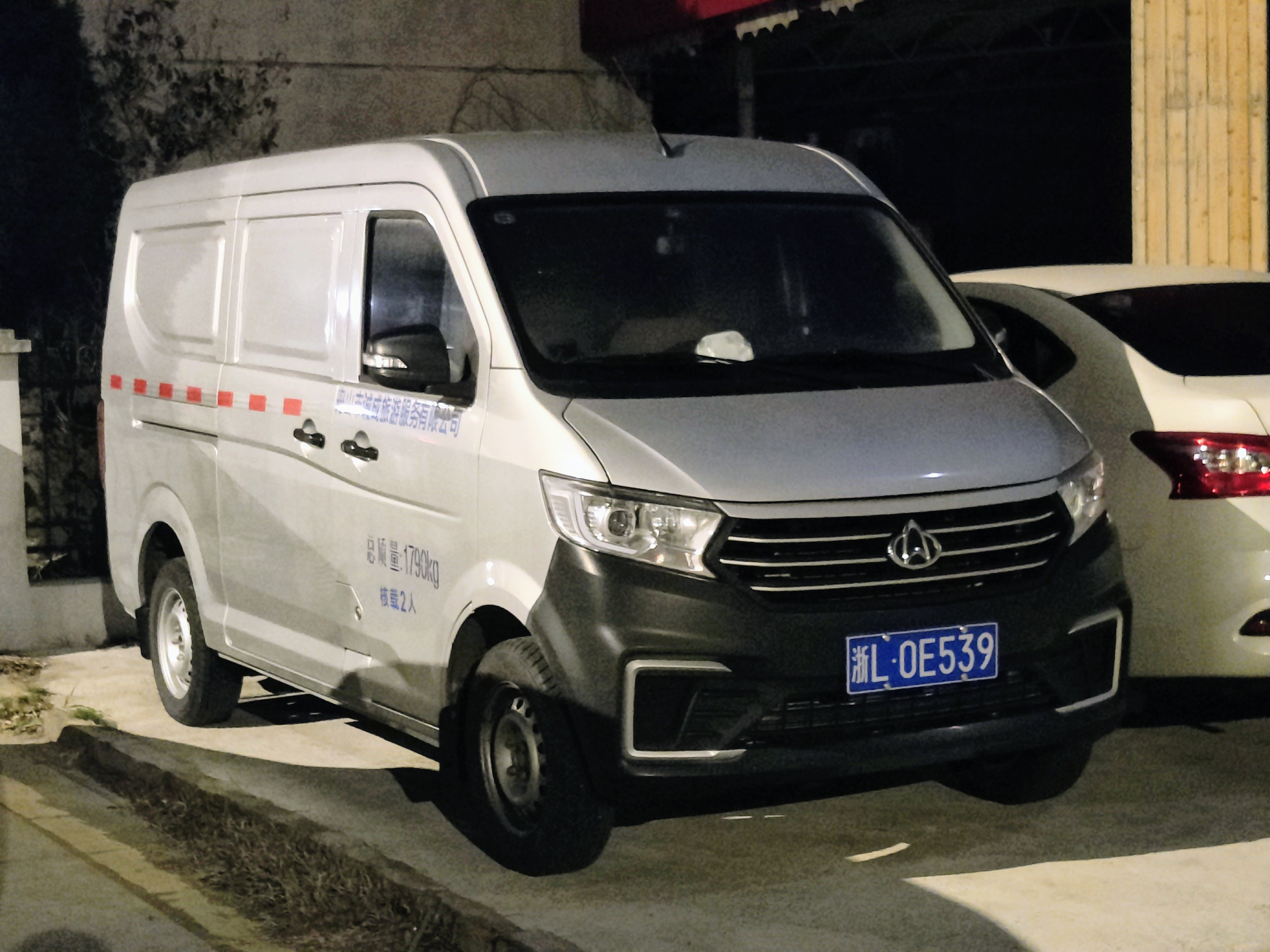
Kuayue Kuayuexing V3

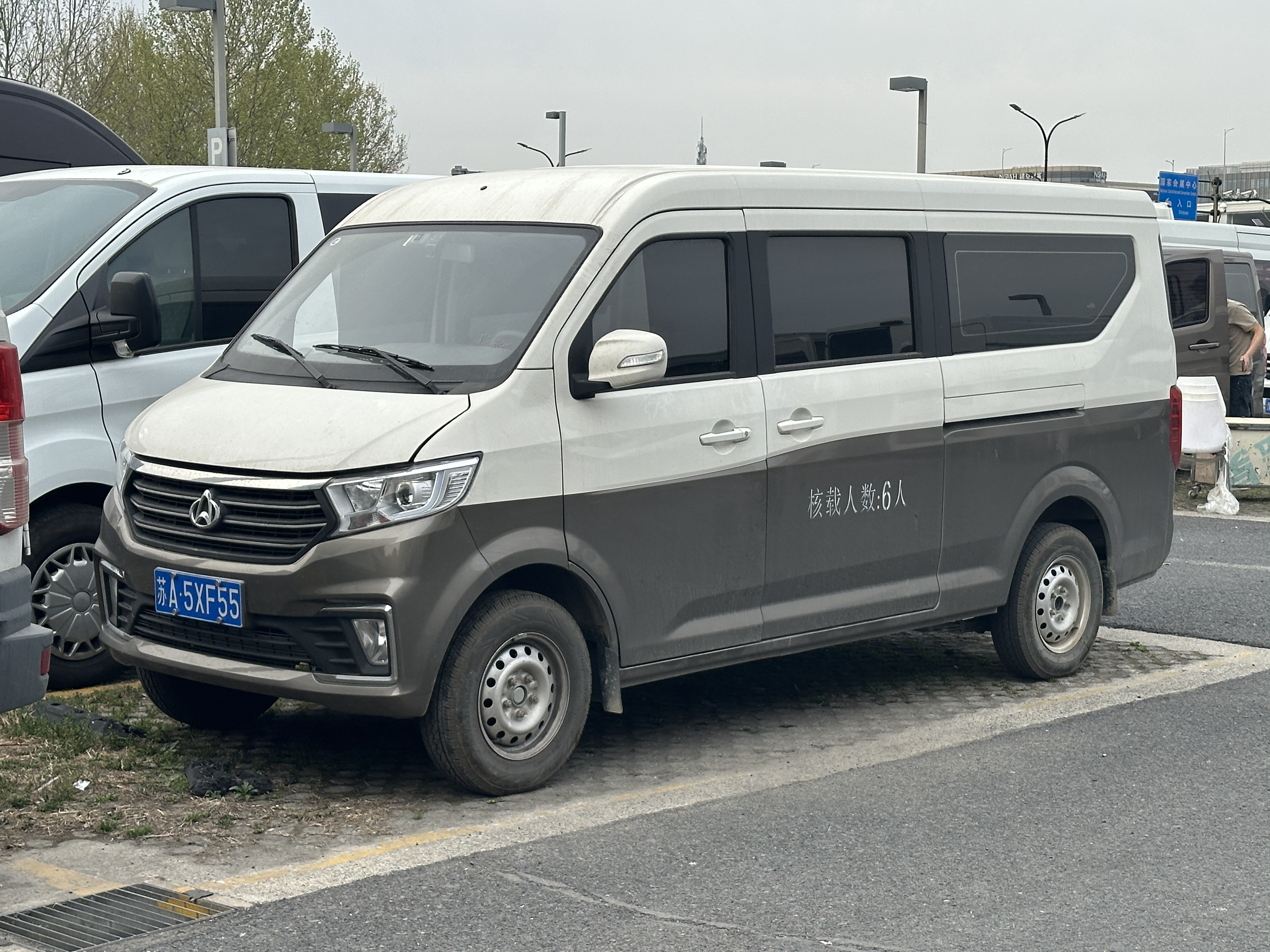
Kuayue Kuayuexing V5

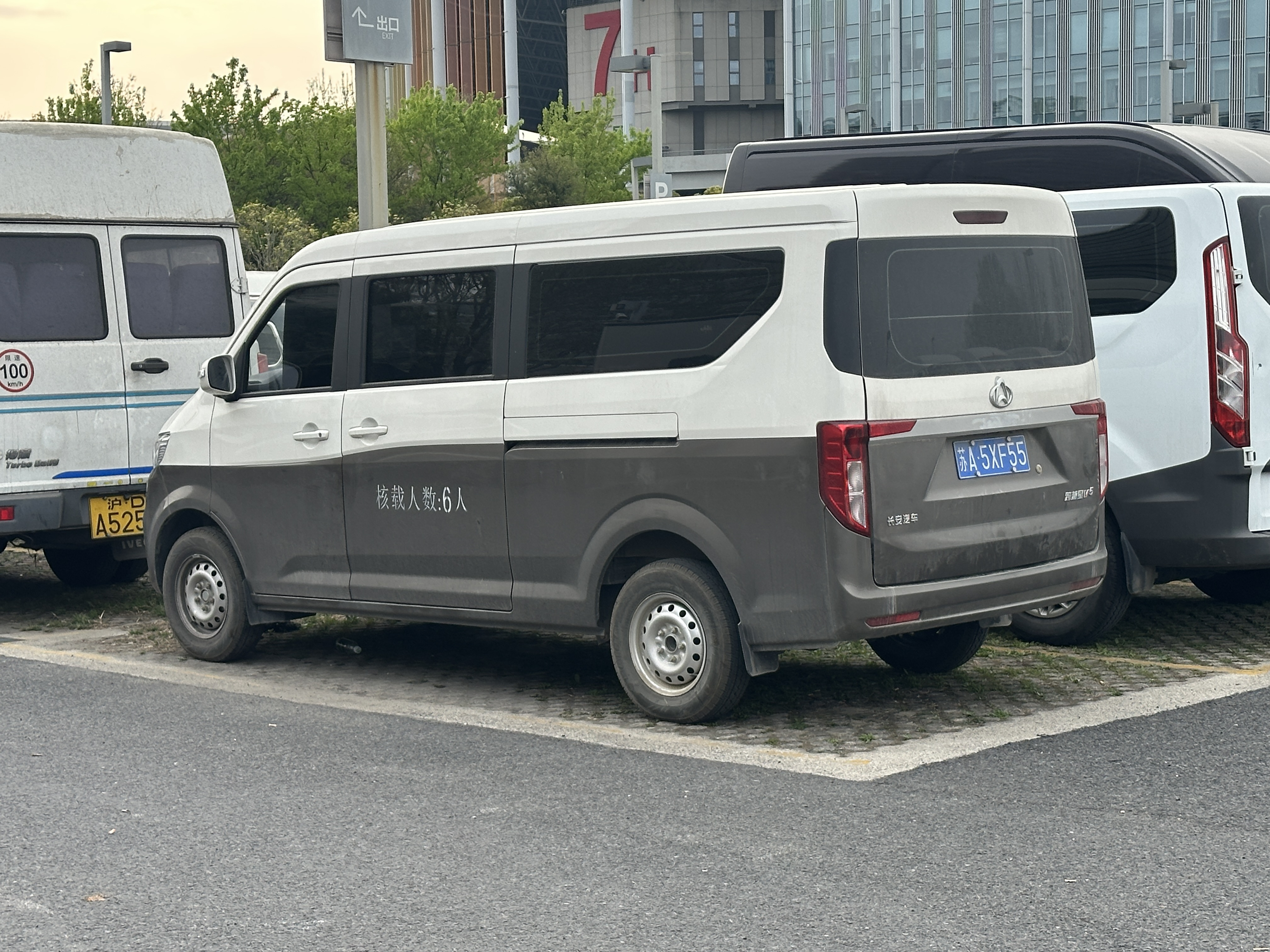
Rear view

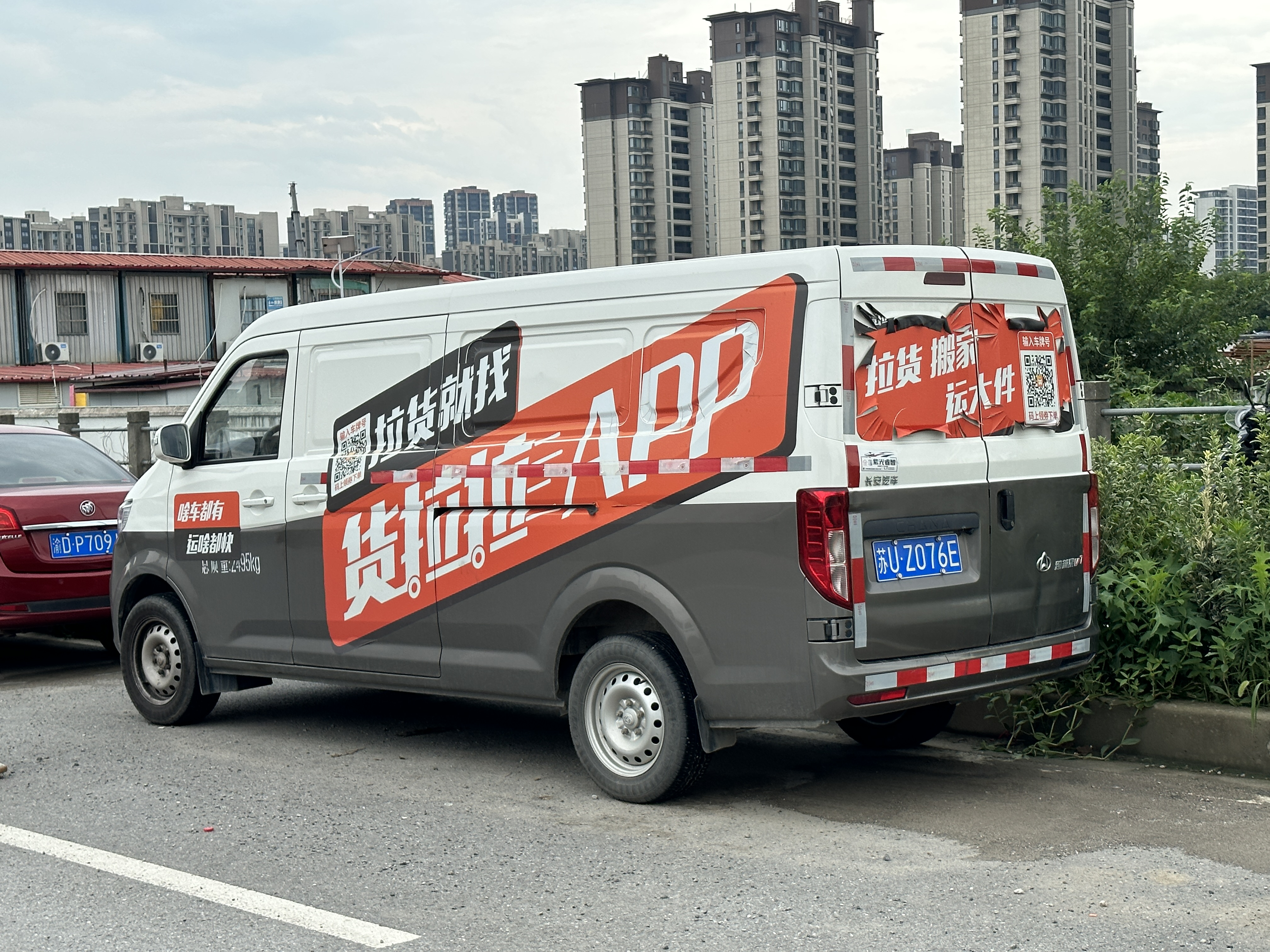
Rear view

== Electric variant ==
The electric versions are also available for the Kuayuexing V5 and Kuayuexing V7. The Kuayuexing V5 NEV is available as a 6 or 7 seater powered by a 60 kW and 220N·m electric motor powering the rear wheels with a 41.86kWh battery supporting a range of 300 km. The Kuayuexing V7EV is available as a 6 or 7 seater powered by a 60 kW and 220N·m electric motor powering the rear wheels with a 41.86kWh battery supporting a range of 300 km.

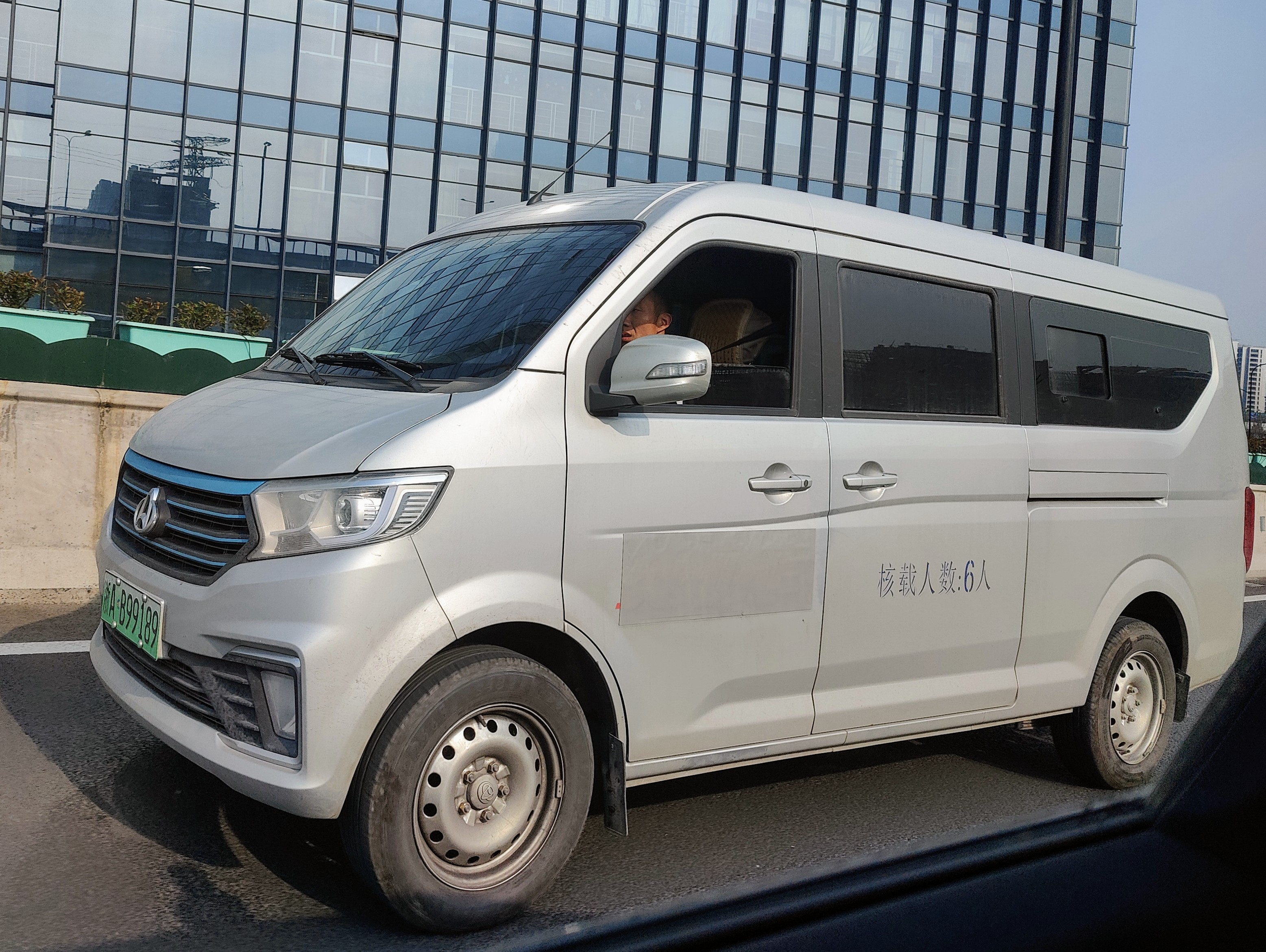
Kuayue Kuayuexing V5 EV

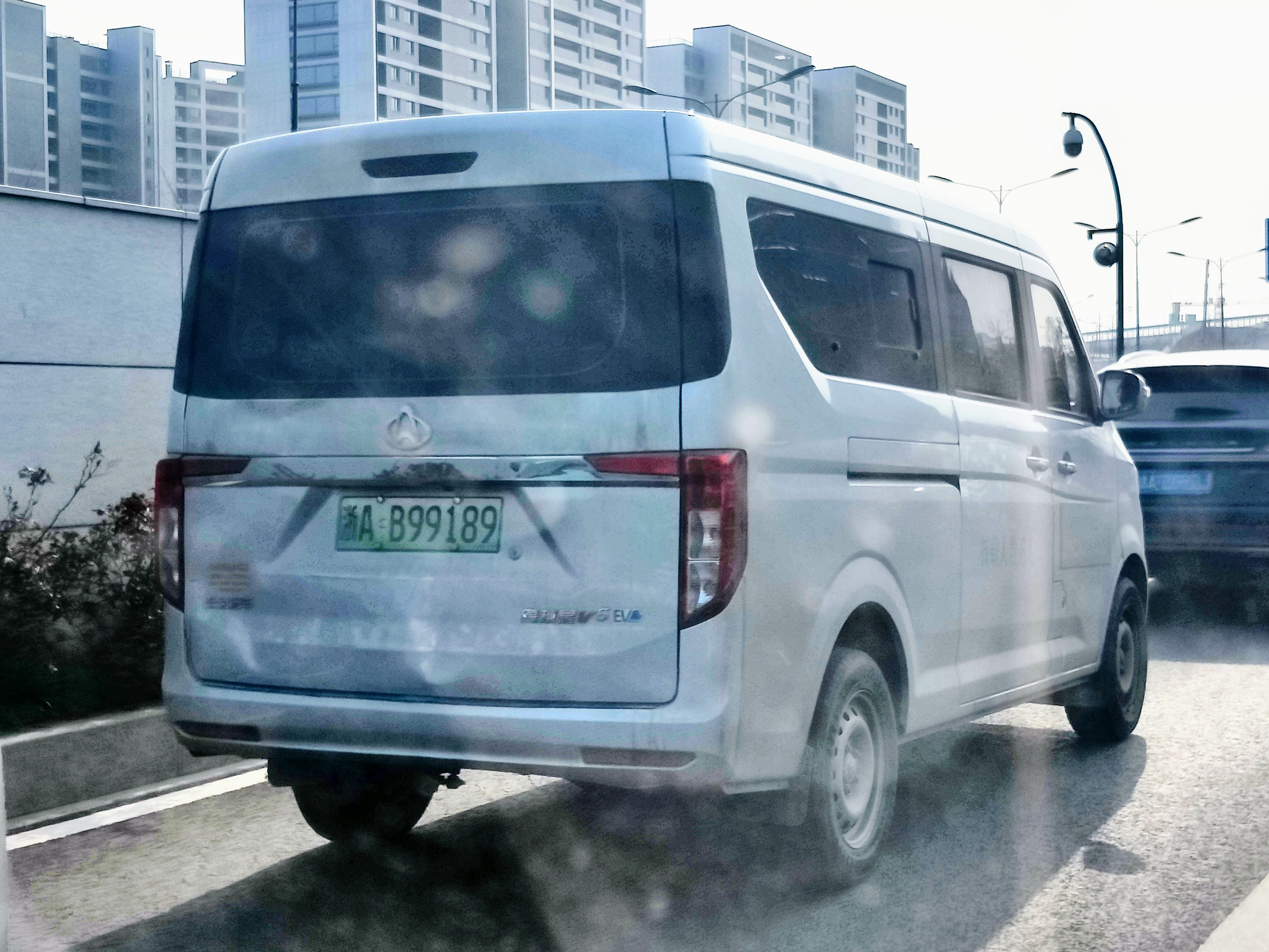
Rear view
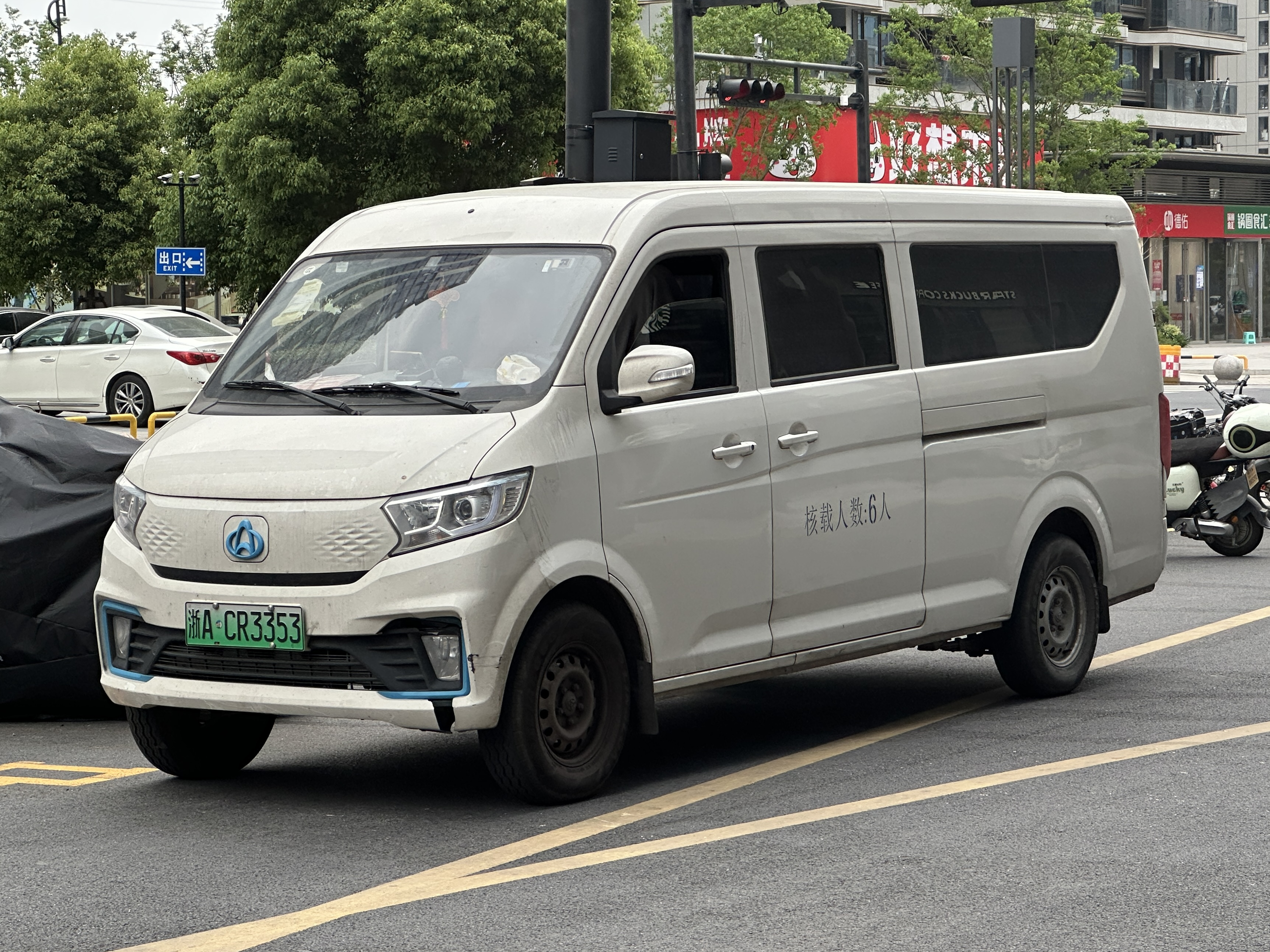
Kuayue Kuayuexing V7 EV (1)

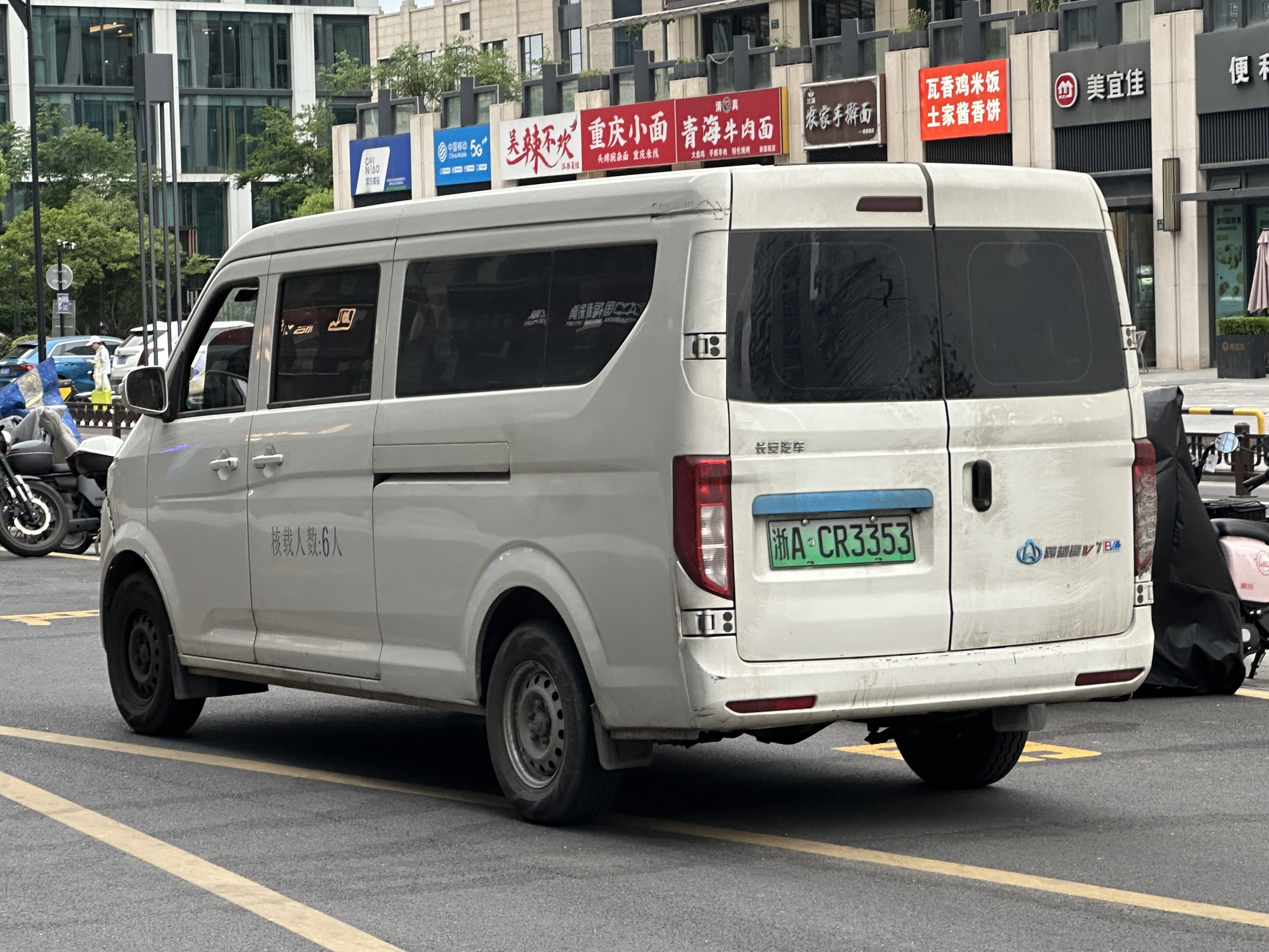
Rear view
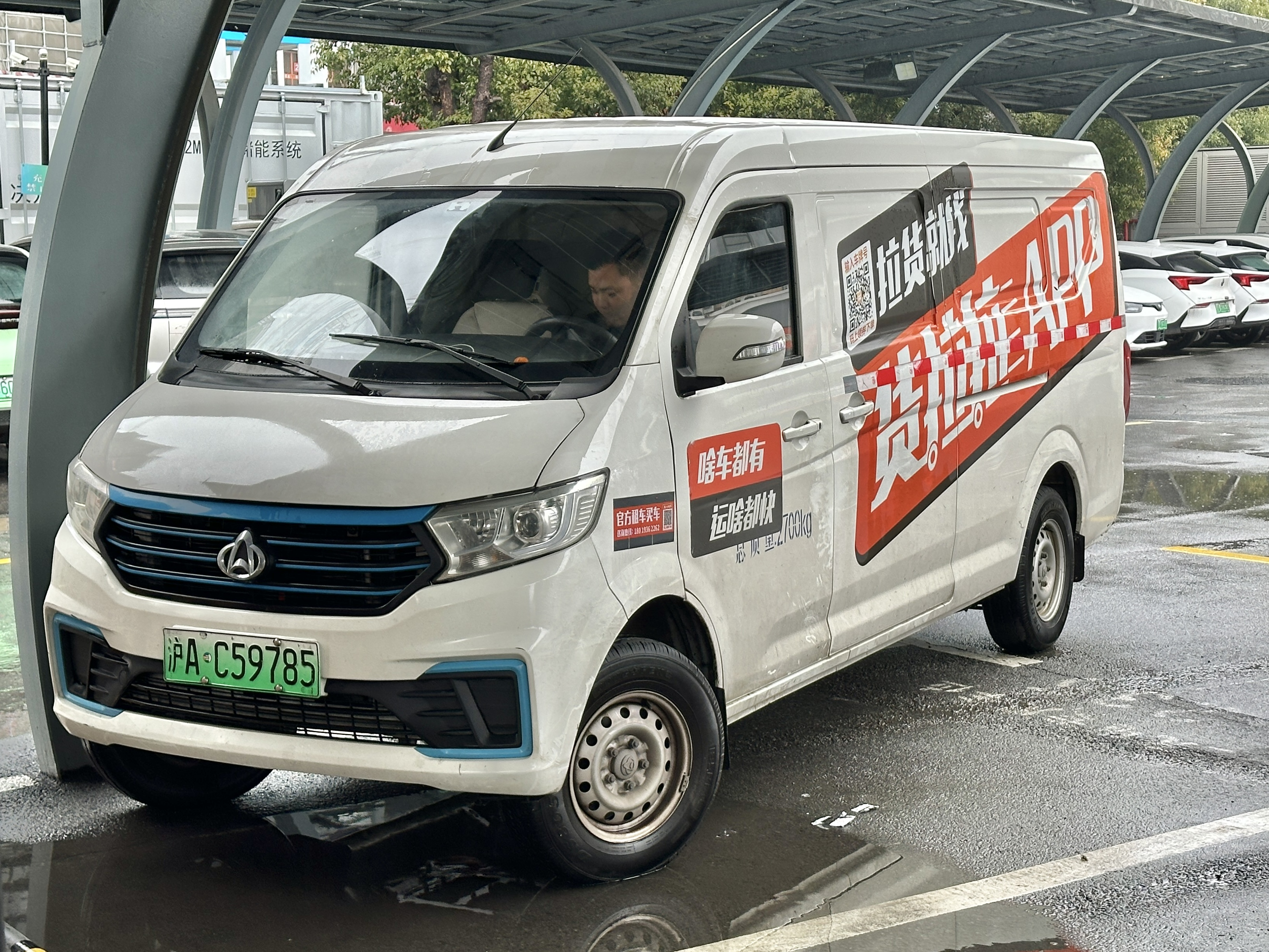
Kuayue Kuayuexing V7 EV (2)

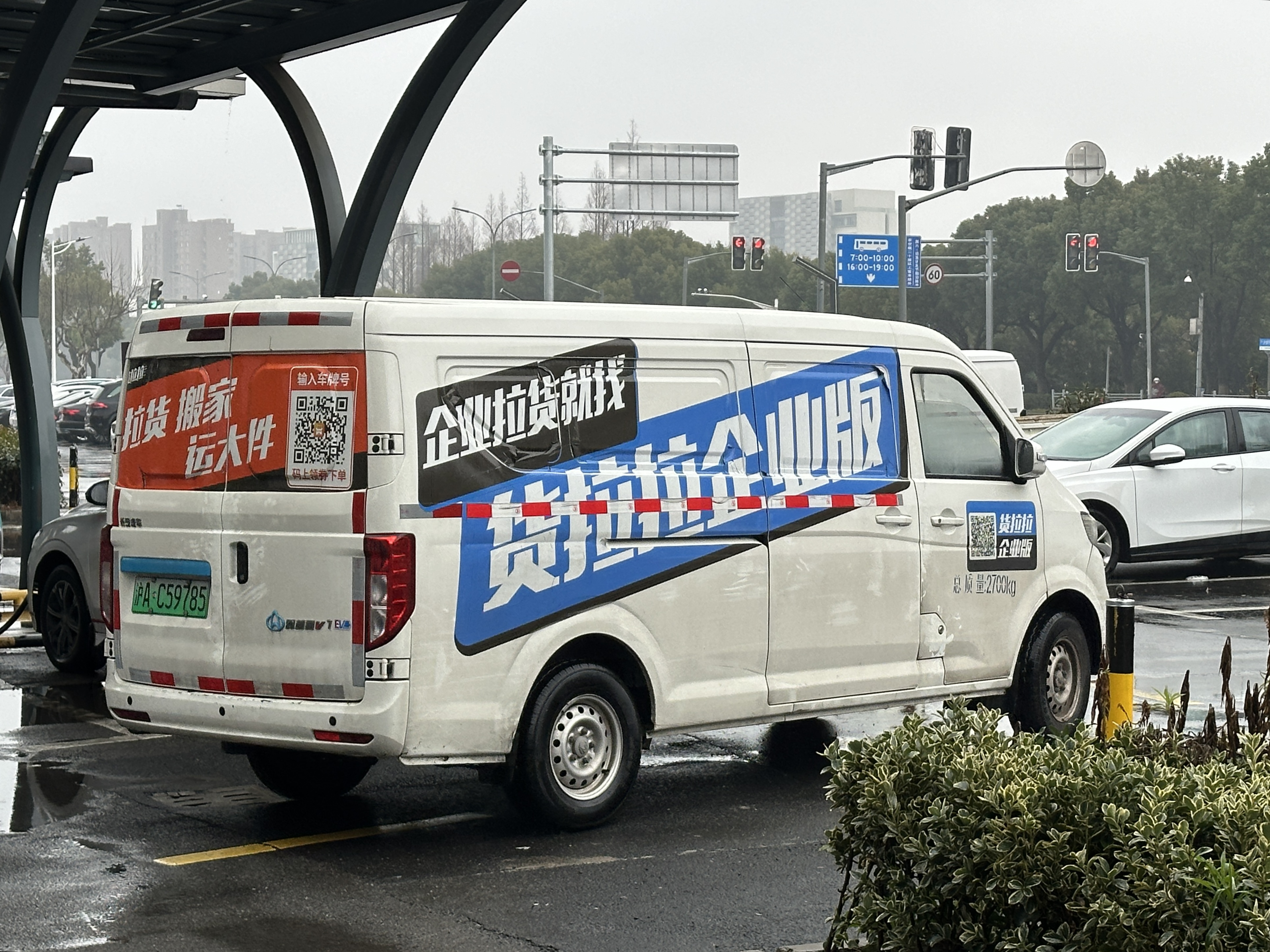
Rear view

== King Long Longyao 6S ==
The King Long Longyao (龙耀) 6S is a rebadged electric variant of the Kuayue Kuayuexing EV vans. It was sold under the King Long brand.

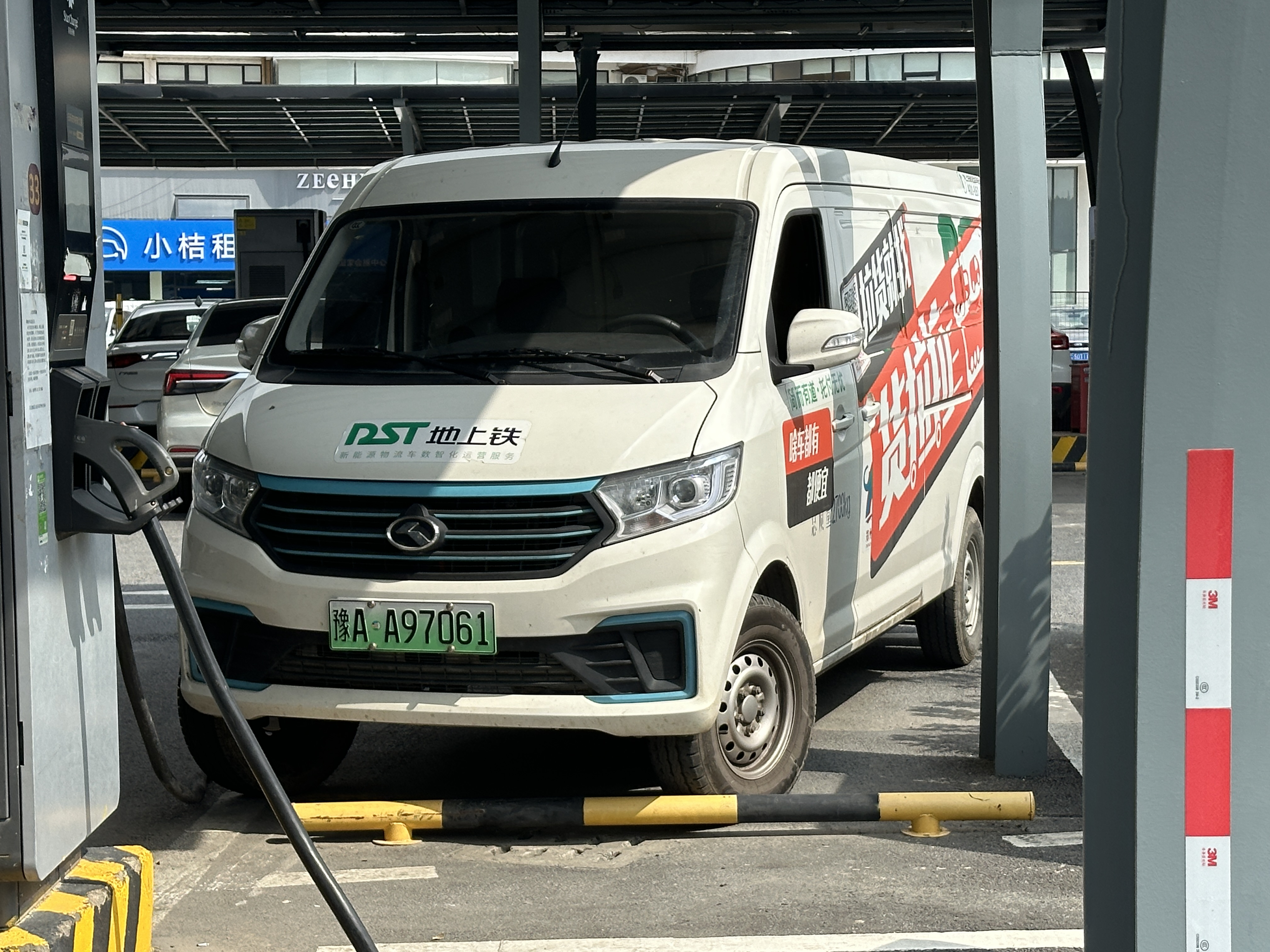
King Long Longyao 6S

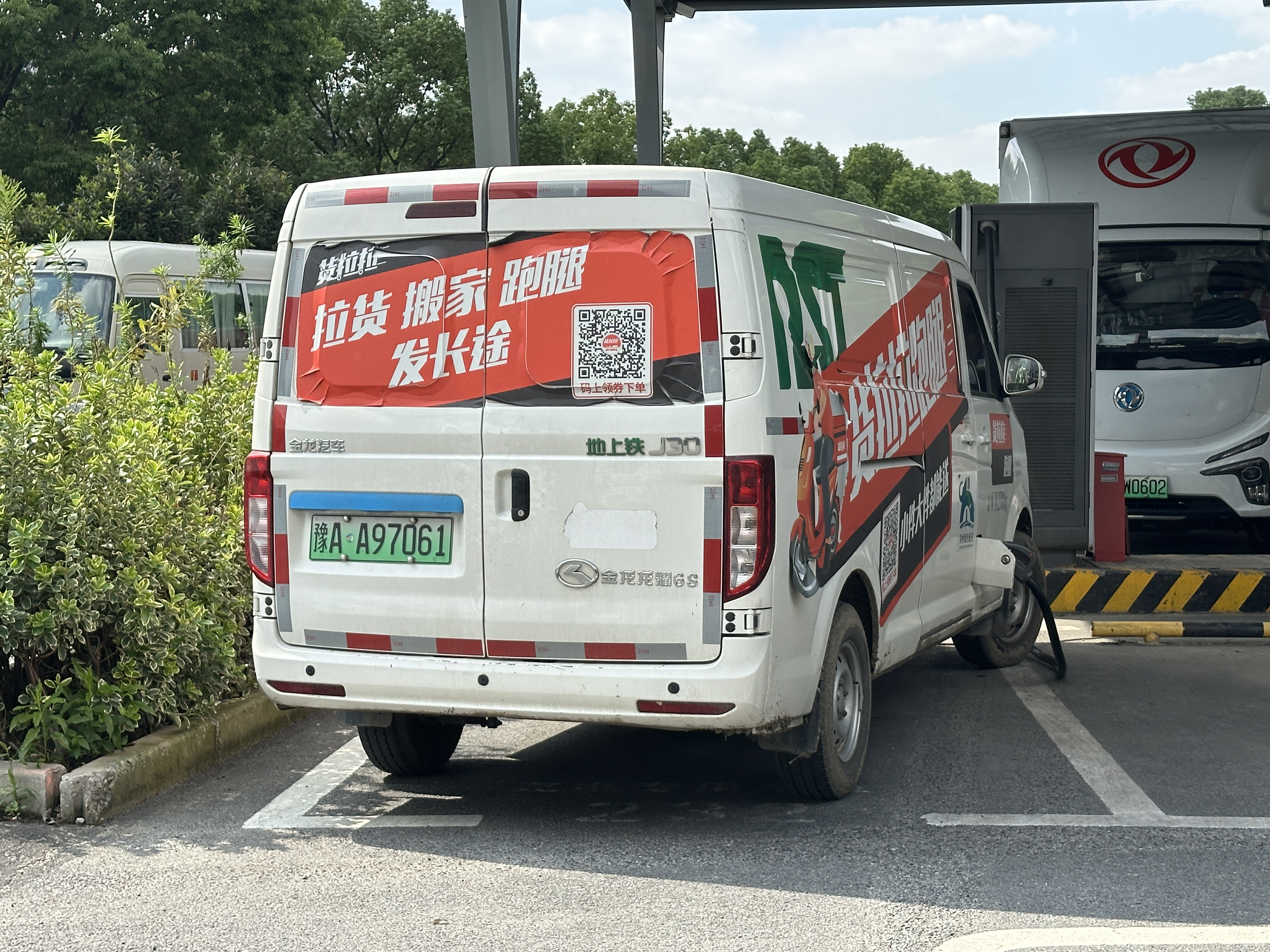
Rear view
