= Keyton EX80 =

Keyton (Qiteng) EX80
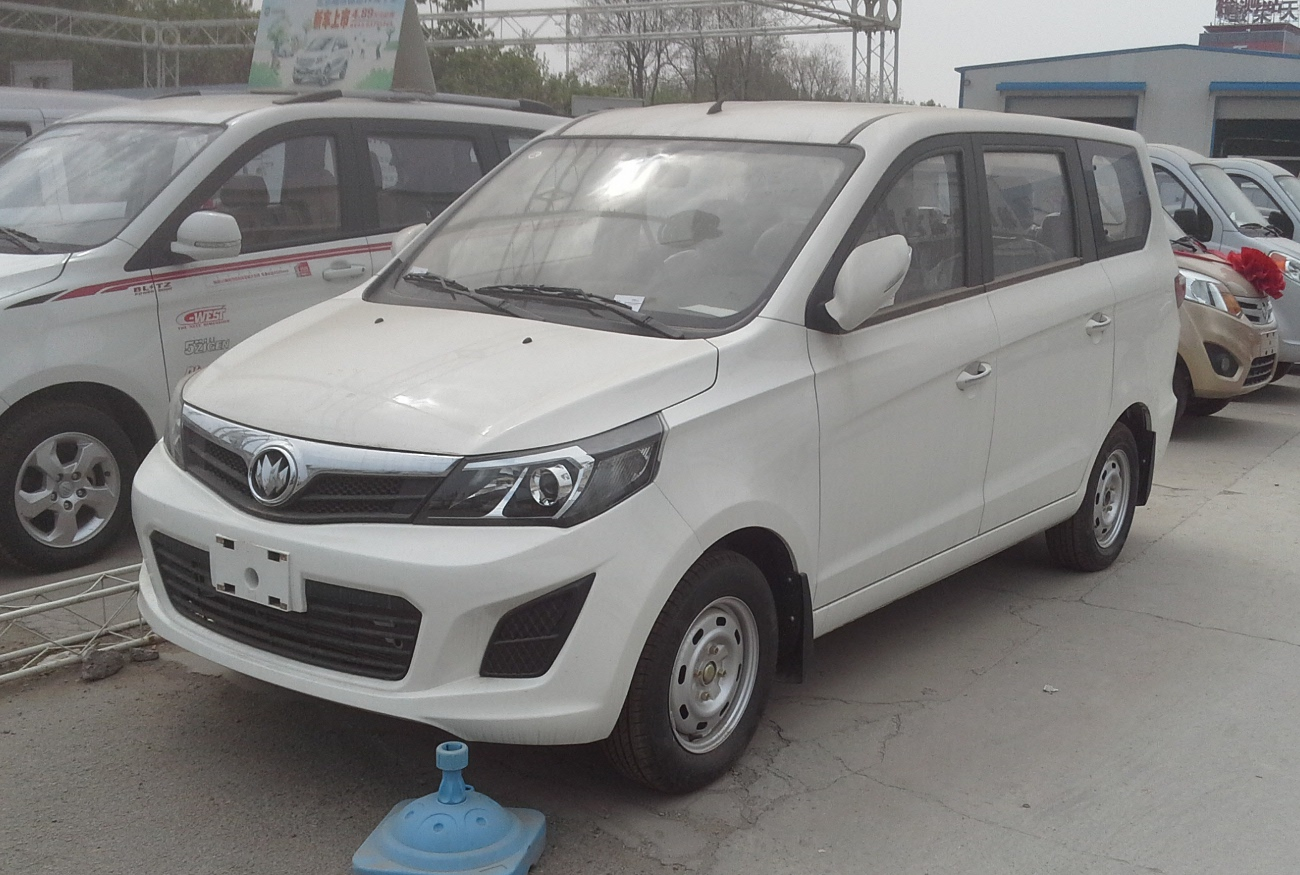

Overview
- Manufacturer: Keyton
- Also called: Joylong EM5; Innoson G20 Smart
- Production: 2015-present
- Assembly: China

Body and chassis
- Class: MPV
- Body style: 5-door MPV
- Layout: FF layout
- Doors: 5
- Related: Keyton V60

Powertrain
- Engine: 1.5 L inline-4 engine
- Transmission: 5-speed manual

Dimensions
- Wheelbase: 2,721 mm (107.1 in)
- Length: 4,397 mm (173.1 in)
- Width: 1,730 mm (68.1 in)
- Height: 1,764 mm (69.4 in); 1,758 mm (69.2 in)(Joylong EM5)

The Keyton EX80 is a compact MPV made by the Keyton (Qiteng) brand of Fujian Motors Group from 2015.

== Overview ==
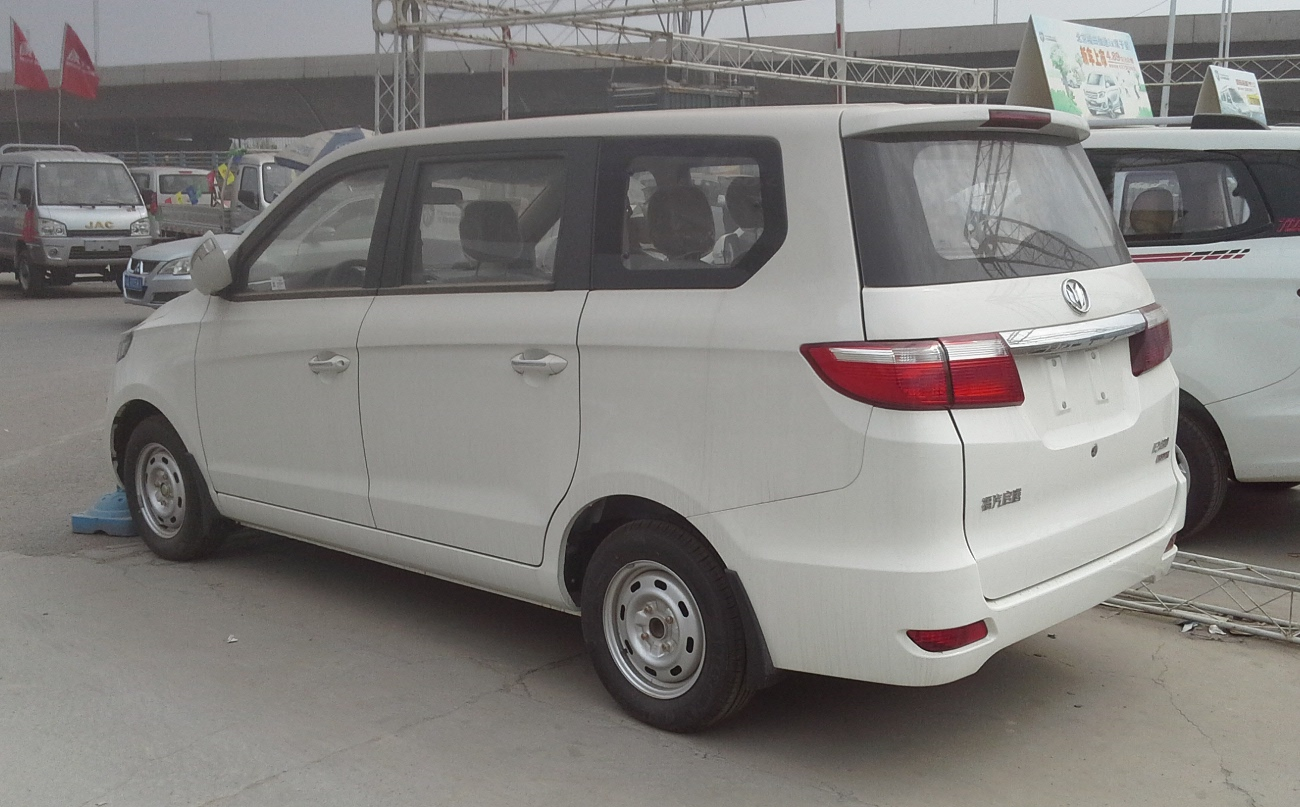
Keyton EX80 rear

The Keyton EX80 is a 7-seat MPV with 3-row reclining seats in a 2+2+3 configuration. The interior feature a medium sized touch screen and the infotainment system includes satellite navigation, MP4 movie player, MP3 music player, USB and Aux-in connectivity. The EX80 was launched in September 2015. Basic features include power windows, electronic mirrors, alloy wheels and fog lamps.

=== Powertrain ===
Power of the EX80 comes from a 1.5 liter four-cylinder petrol engine with 116 hp, mated to a five-speed manual transmission.

== Joylong EM5 ==
The Joylong EM5 (Chinese: 九龙EM5) is an electric MPV made by Joylong based on the Keyton EX80, and is essentially an electrified rebadge version of the EX80. The EM5 has a max speed of 100 km/h and a 6.6kw battery.

The dimensions of the EM5 is 4397 mm/1730 mm/1758 mm, and a wheelbase of 2721 mm. It has 5 doors and 7 seats, and costs $20,000 - $26,000. The Joylong EM5 was shown alongside the EM3 at the 2019 Shanghai Auto Show.

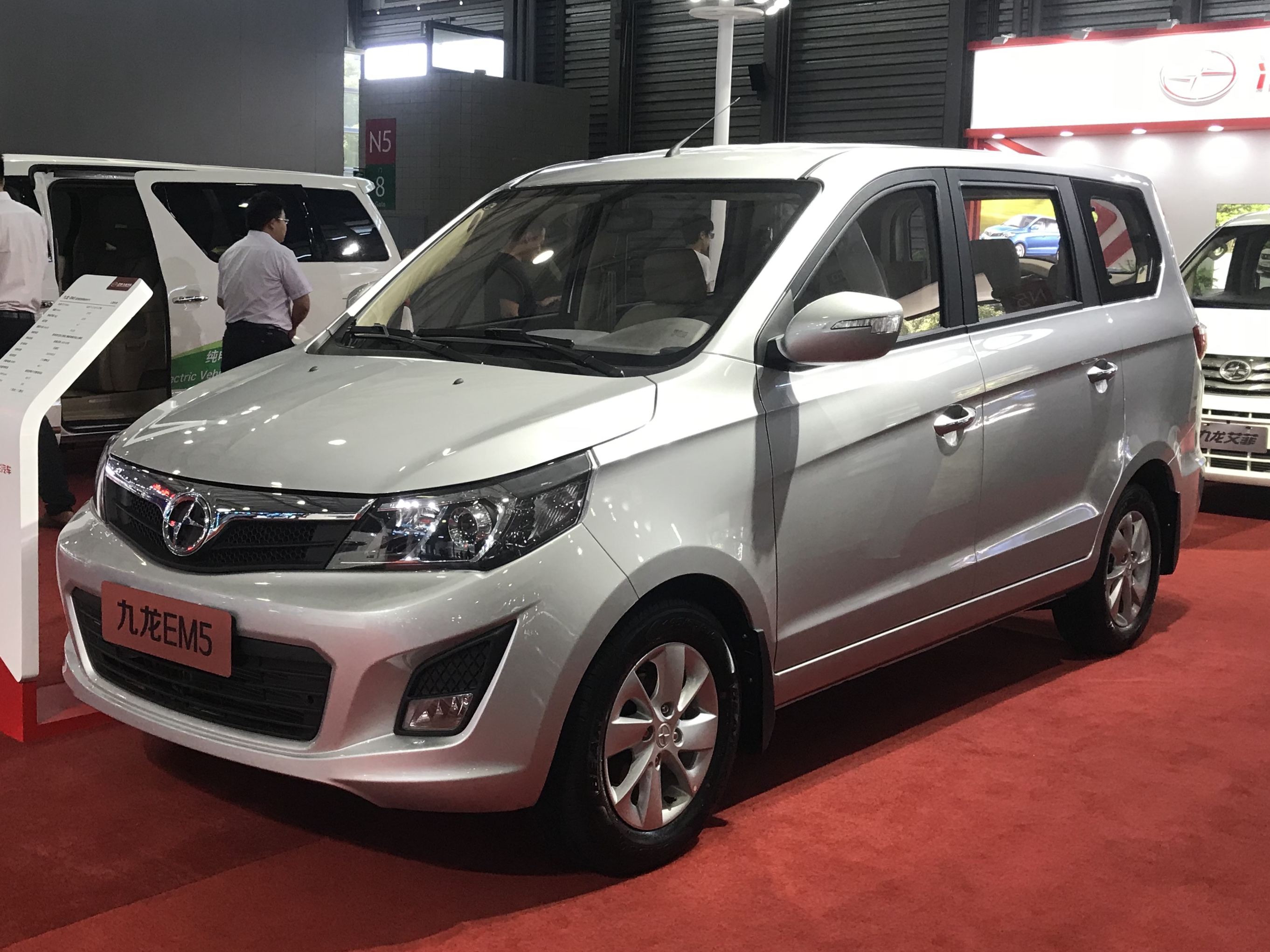
Joylong EM5 (front)

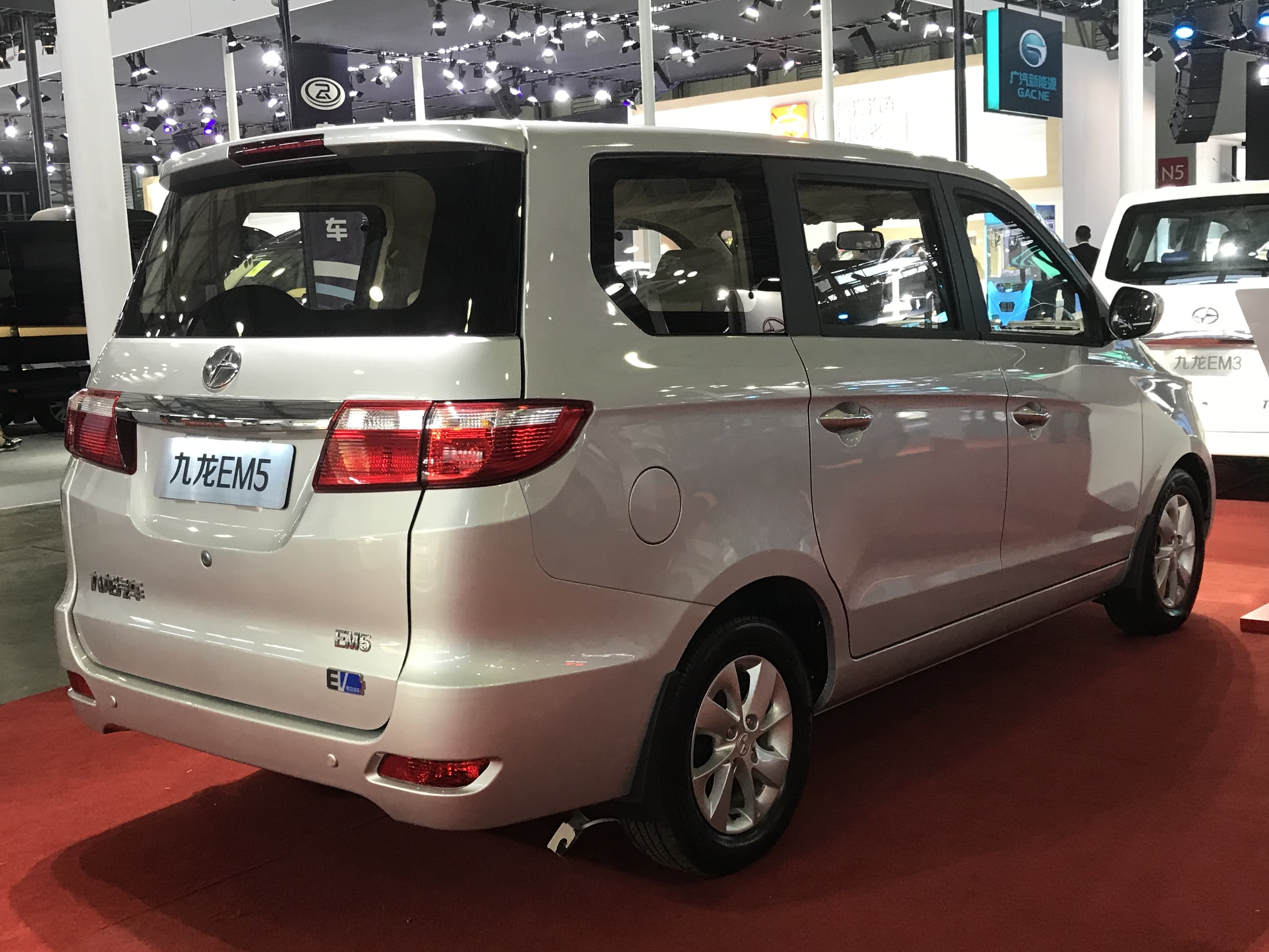
Joylong EM5 (rear)
