= V60 =

V60 or V-60 may refer to:

== Automobiles ==
- Keyton V60, a Chinese MPV
- Levdeo V60, a Chinese hatchback
- Volvo V60, a Swedish estate car

== Other uses ==
- DB Class V 60, a West German locomotive
- DR Class V 60, an East German locomotive
- Hanlin eReader V60, an ebook reader
- Hario V60, a coffee brewer
- Kamov V-60, a Soviet helicopter design
- LG V60 ThinQ, a smartphone
- MÁV Class V60, a Hungarian locomotive
- NEC V60, a microprocessor
- Vanadium-60, an isotope of vanadium
