= King Long Kaige =

Chinese light commercial van

King Long Kaige (凯歌)
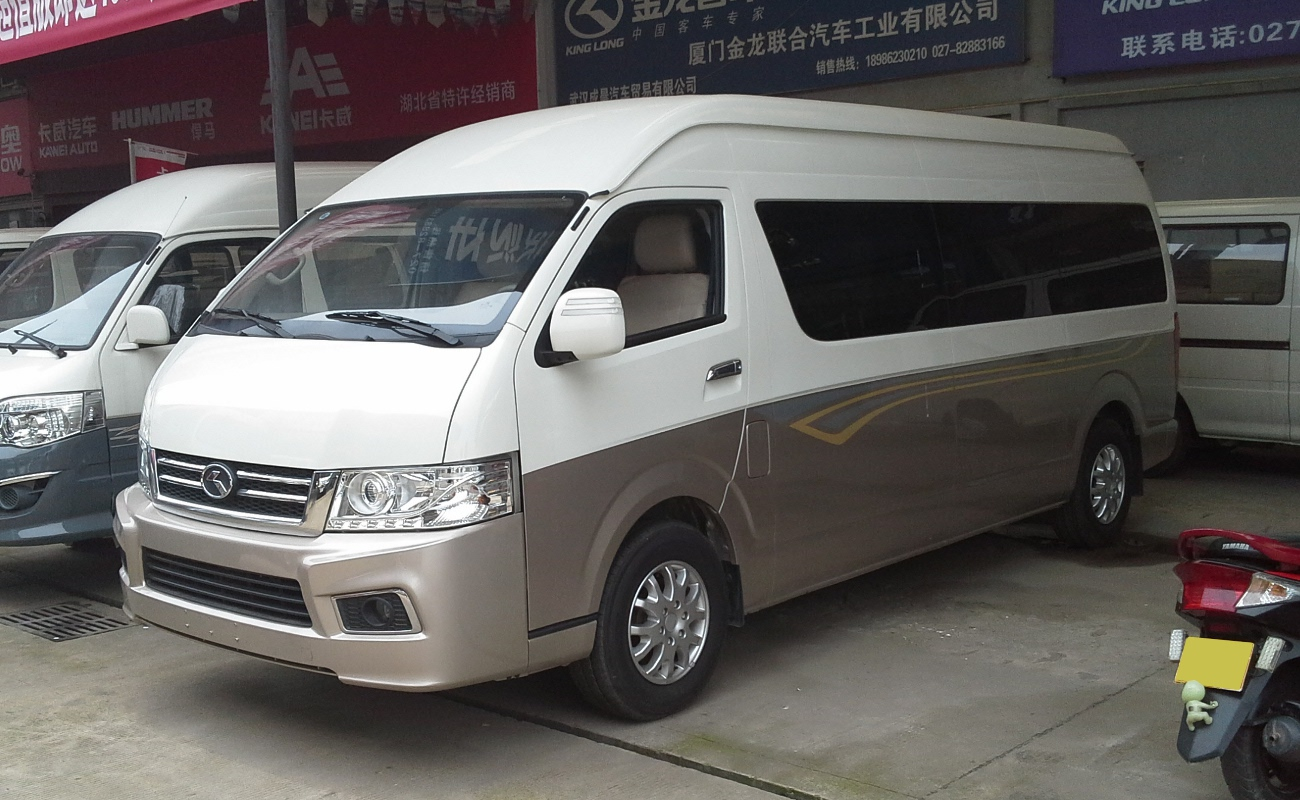

Overview
- Also called: CAM Placer-X (Malaysia); Go Auto-Higer Ace (Malaysia); King Long Kingo (Jamaica); King Long XinJinwei/ New Jinwei (Cheaper model); Golden Dragon X5; SAG Max EV (Indonesia); Pyeonghwa Changjeon 1703/2103 (North Korea)
- Production: 2013–present
- Assembly: China: Xiamen

Body and chassis
- Class: Full-size van
- Body style: 4-door minibus
- Layout: Front-engine, rear-wheel-drive
- Related: Higer H5C; Joylong A-series

Powertrain
- Engine: 2.4 L I4; 2.5 L turbo I4 (H6); 2.7 L I4
- Transmission: 5-speed manual

Dimensions
- Wheelbase: Kaige: 3,110 mm (122.4 in); Kaige K6/EV: 3,720 mm (146.5 in)
- Length: Kaige: 5,470 mm (215.4 in); Kaige K6: 5,998 mm (236.1 in); Kaige EV: 6,080 mm (239.4 in)
- Width: 1,885 mm (74.2 in)
- Height: Kaige/Kaige K6: 2,285 mm (90.0 in); Kaige EV: 2,270 mm (89.4 in)

The King Long Kaige is a series of light commercial van produced by the Chinese automobile manufacturer King Long based on the chassis of the King Long Jinwei as a more premium solution. The King Long Kaige has since been available in a wide range of body configurations, including a minivan/MPV, minibus, panel van, crew van, and an ambulance.

== Overview ==
There are three engine options for the King Long Kaige including a 2.4 liter inline-four engine producing 139 hp, a 2.5 liter turbo inline-four engine producing 116 hp, and a 2.7 liter inline-four engine producing 163 hp.

There are two versions of the King Long Kaige, including the standard King Long Kaige with 6, 7, 8, 9, 11, 13 and 14 seater configurations and the larger King Long Kaige K6 with 17 and 18 seater configurations.

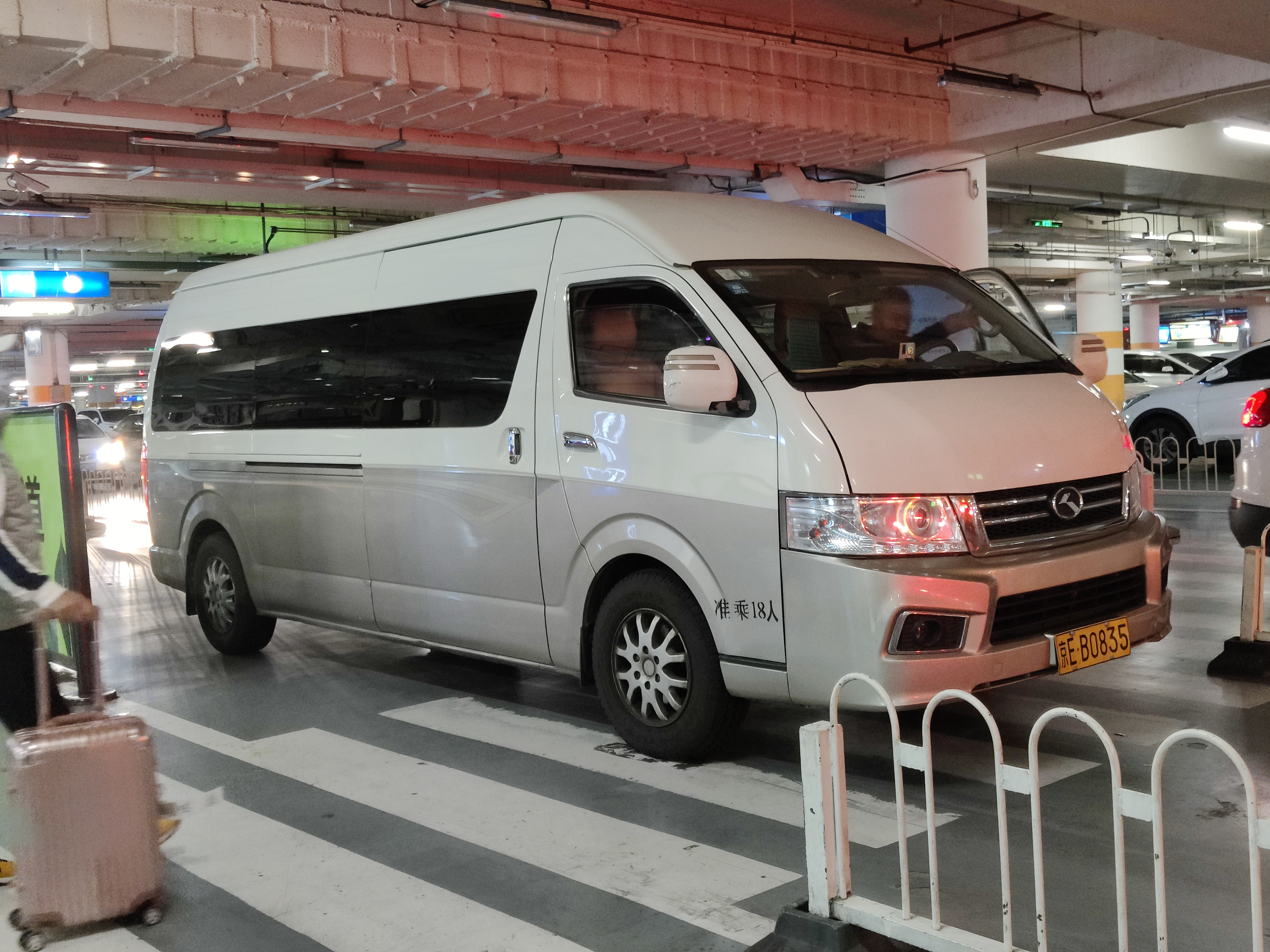
King Long Kaige

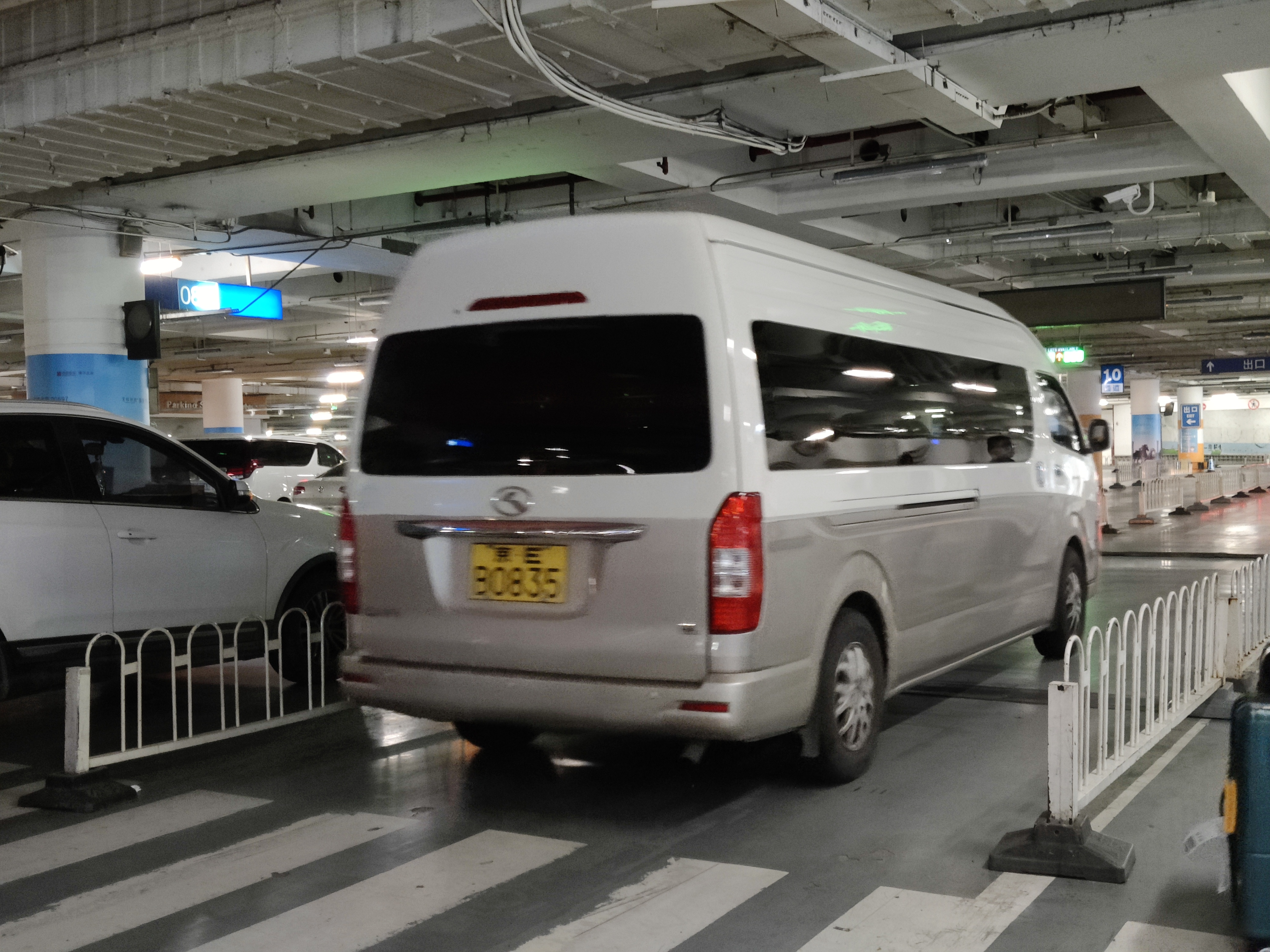
Rear view

An electric version of the King Long Kaige was released by King Long in 2015, featuring the long wheelbase of the K6 versions and an even longer full vehicle length of 6.08 metres (19.9 ft). The NEDC electric range is 140 km (87 mi) and is capable of a 220 km (140 mi) range if driven in a stable speed of 40 km/h (25 mph).

== Golden Dragon variants ==
Just like several other King Long products, a version was also sold under the Golden Dragon brand by Xiamen Golden Dragon Bus Co. Ltd called the Golden Dragon X5 (wide body variant) and Golden Dragon Z4 (Z-series, narrow body variant). The Golden Dragon X5 was also sold as the Higer H5C.

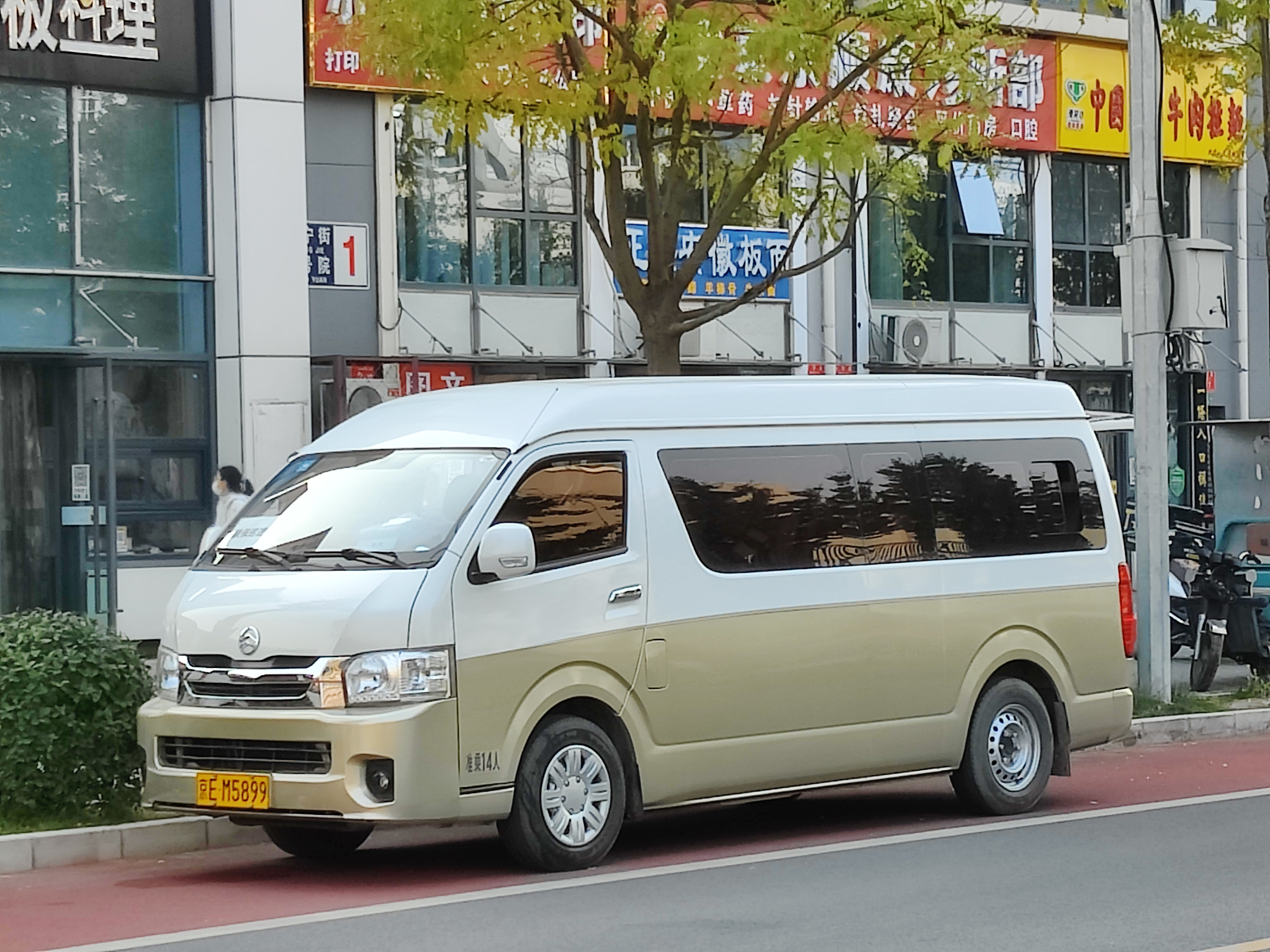
Golden Dragon Haishi Z-series

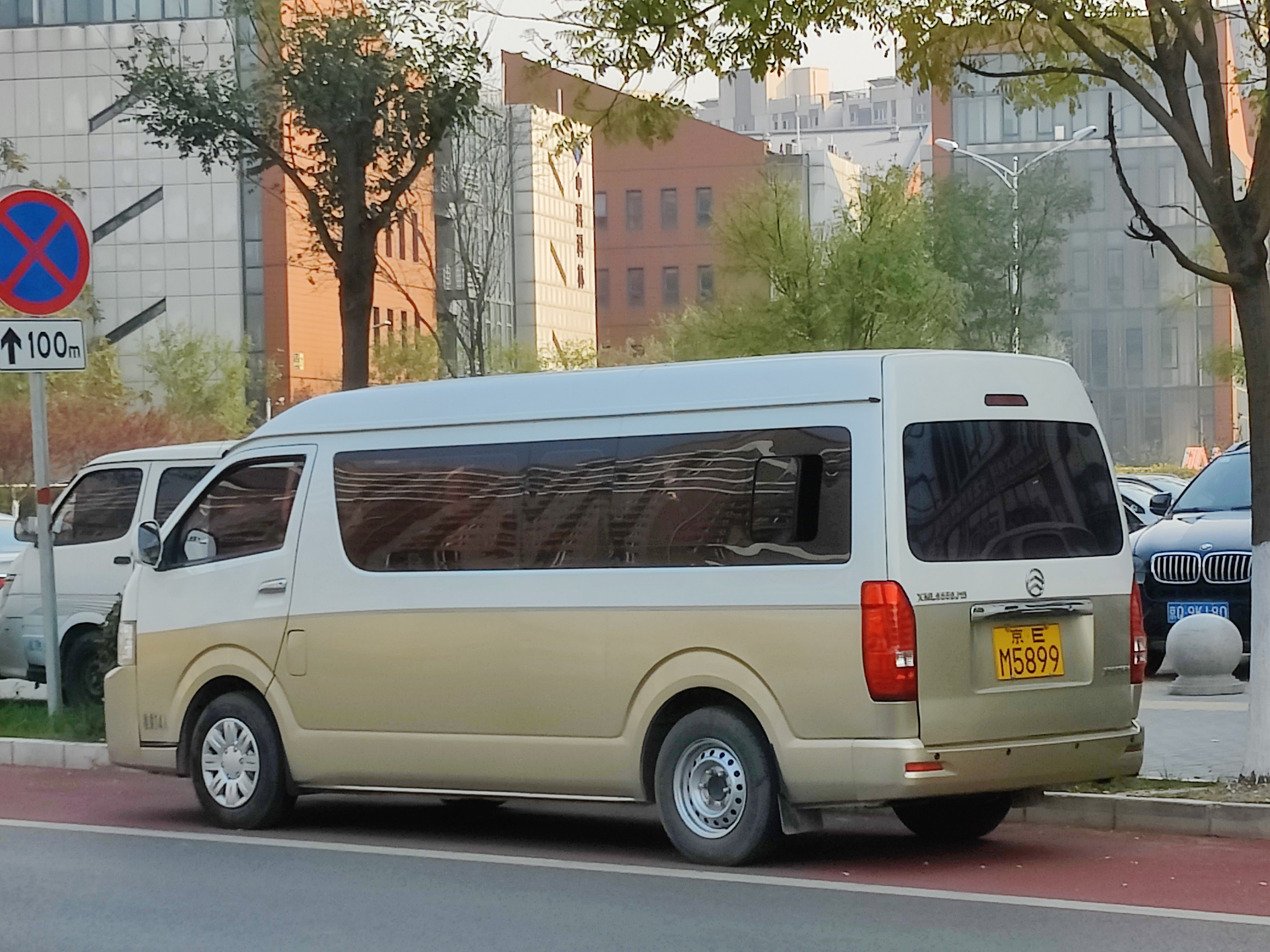
Rear view

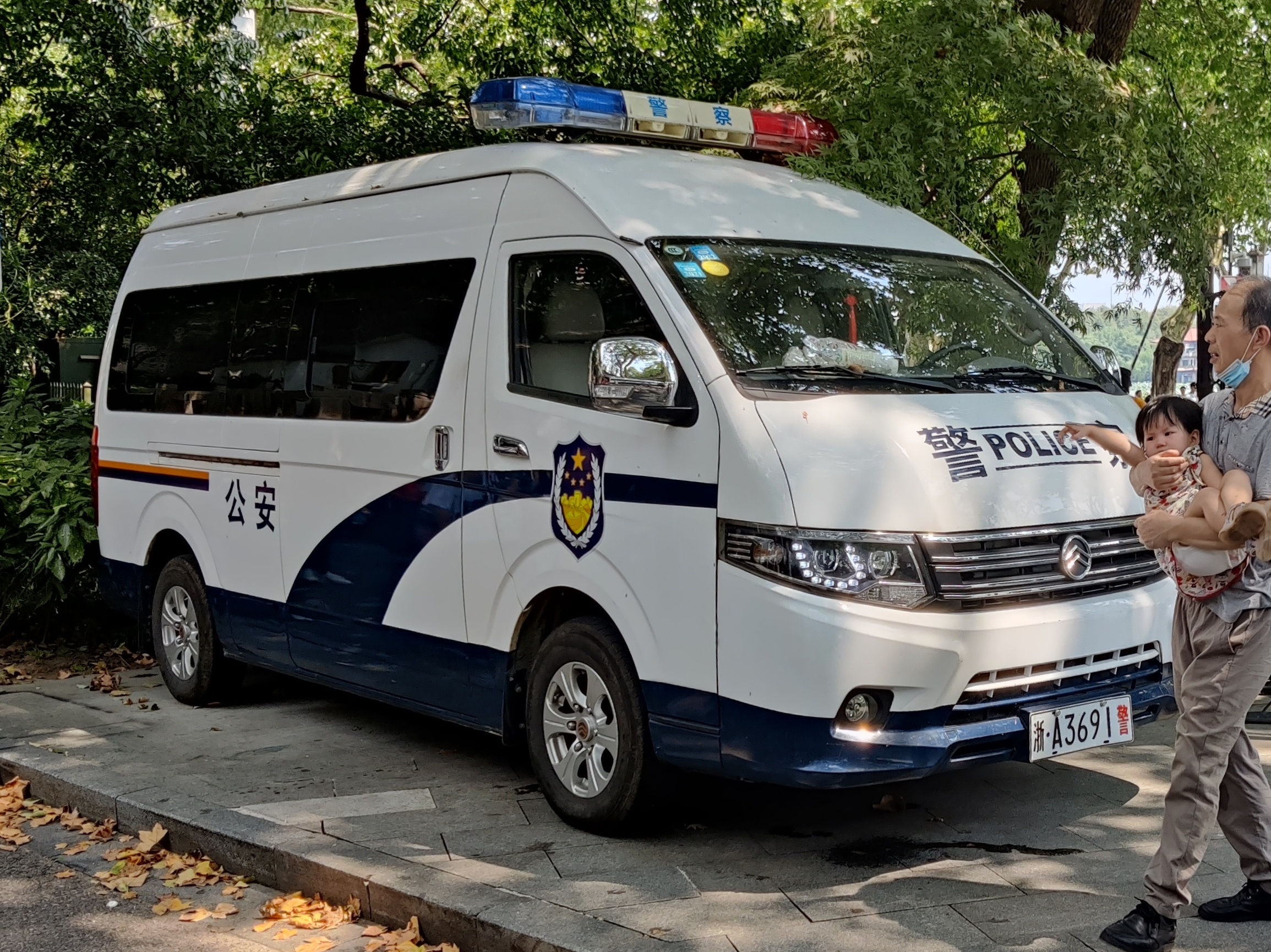
Golden Dragon X5 Series Police Van

== Overseas market ==
=== Malaysian market ===
The King Long Kaige in China was launched in Malaysia in around 2011 as the King Long Farid. The name was dropped in favor of CAM, which stands for China Auto Manufacturers. The CAM Placer-X is the model name used in Malaysia, while the styling is shared with the Joylong A-series vans, the version sold by Joylong in China.

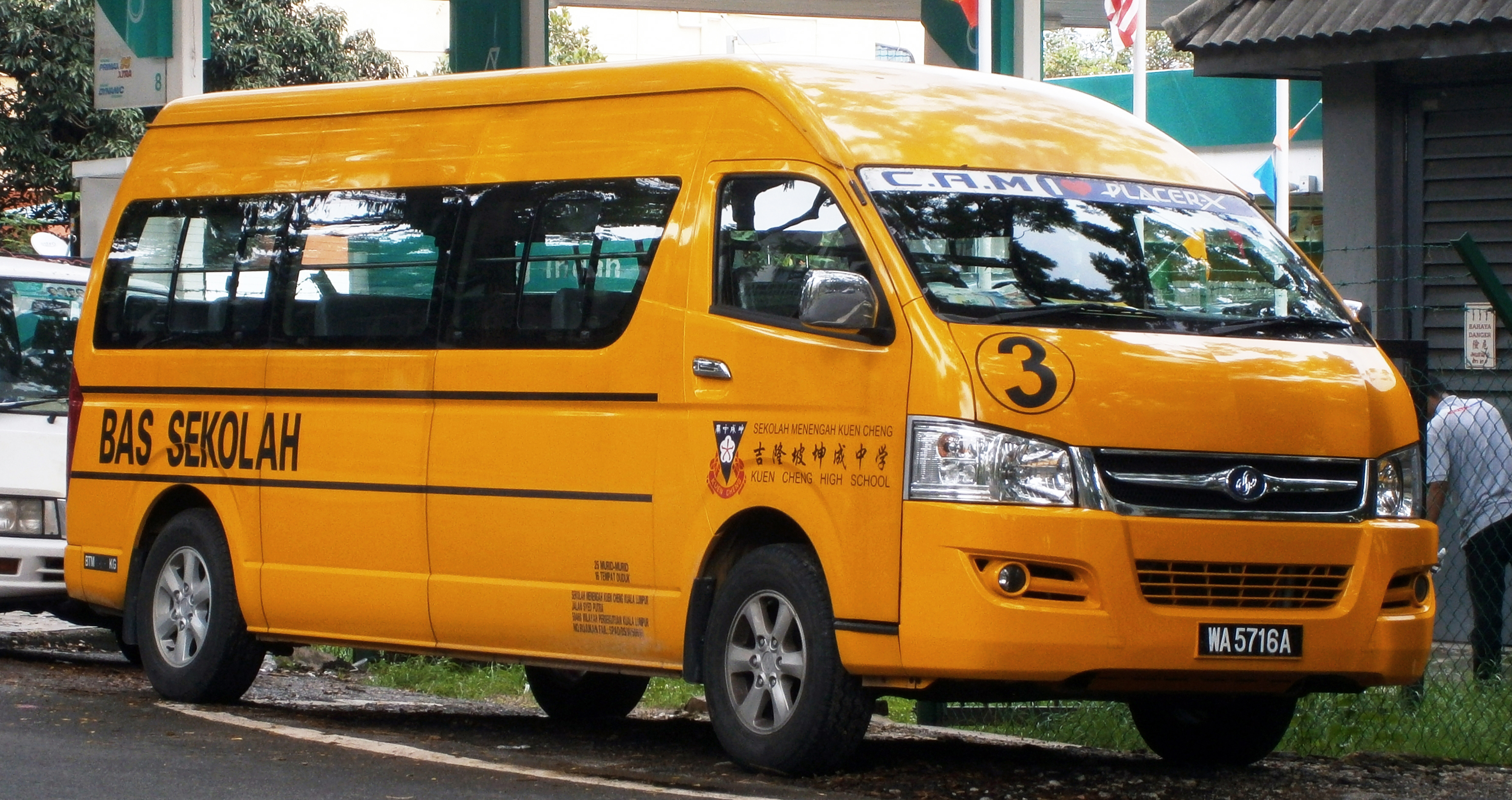
2014 CAM (King Long, Farid) Placer-X 2.5L CDTi School Bus in Petaling Jaya, Malaysia

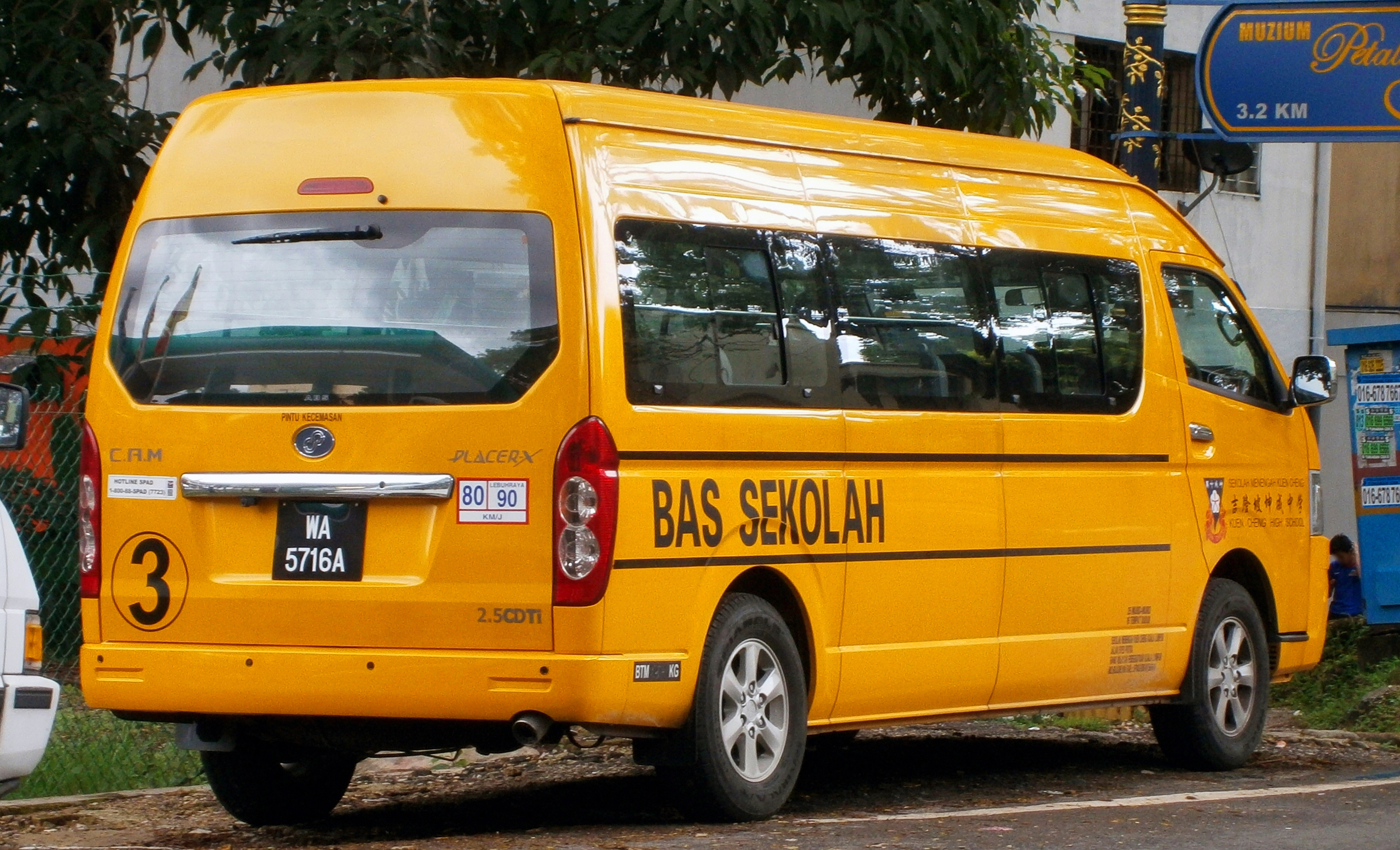
Rear view

=== Jamaican market ===
The version sold in Jamaica was renamed as the King Long Kingo.

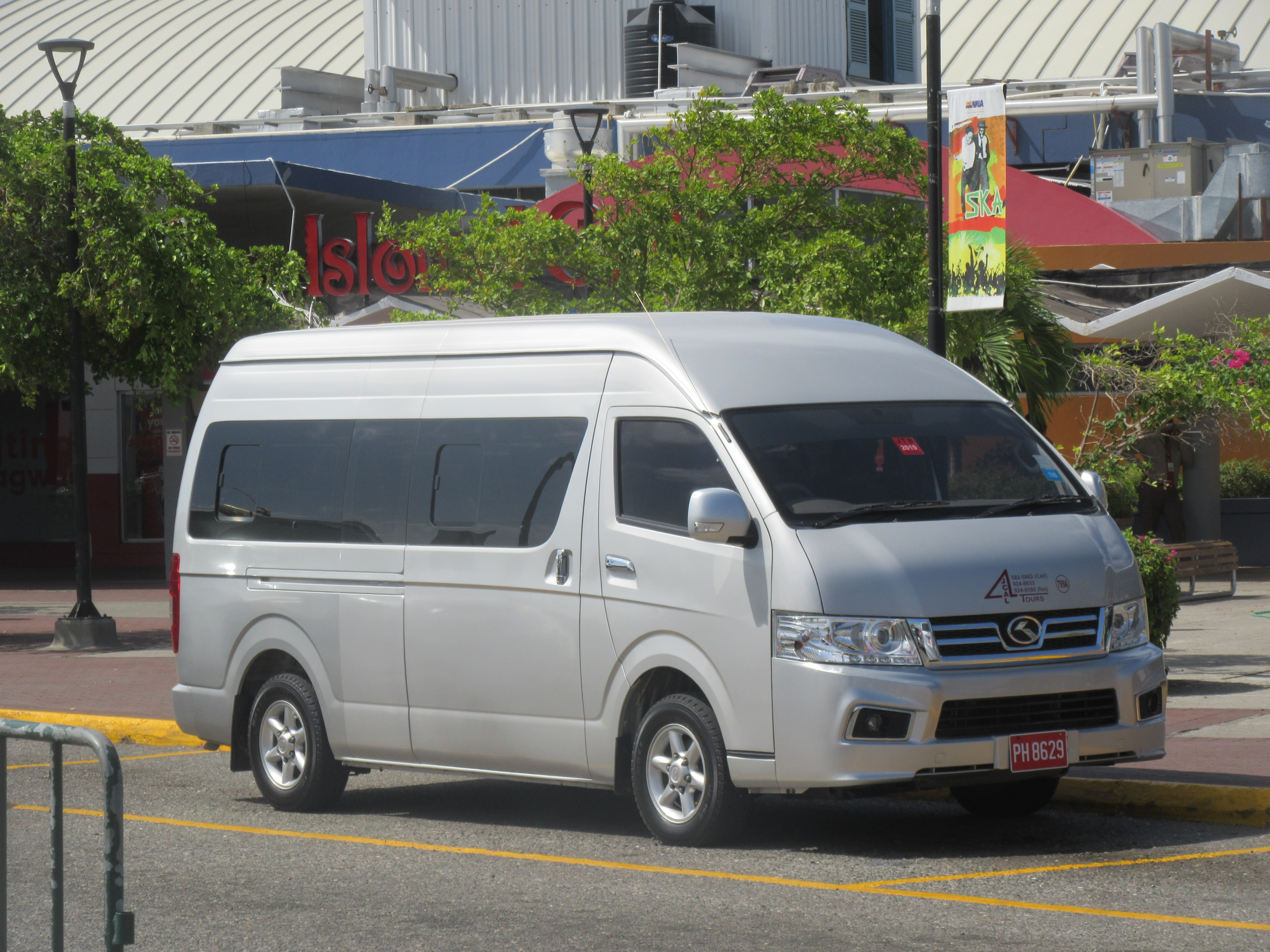
King Long Kingo in Jamaica

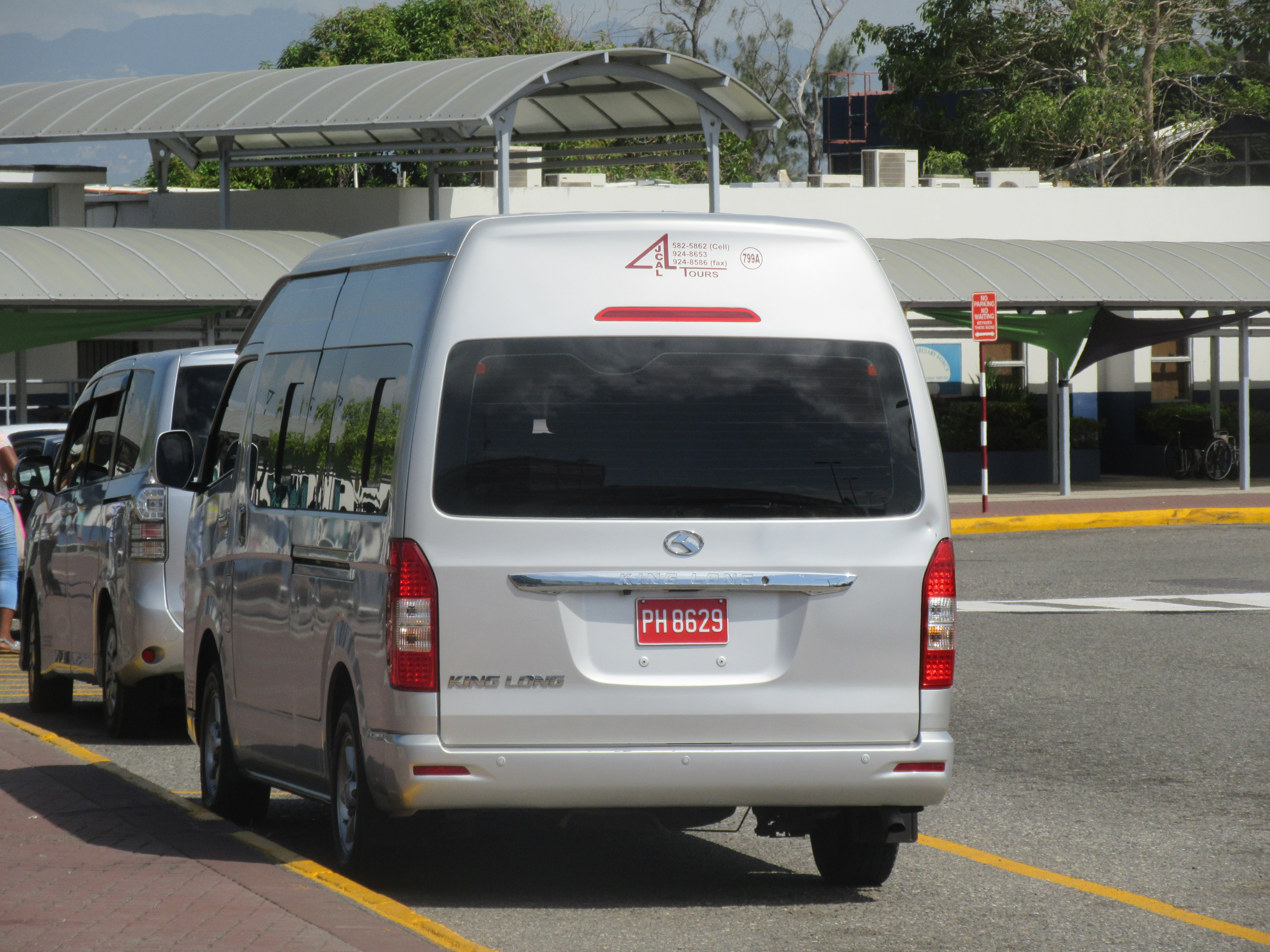
Rear view

== Controversies ==
The designs of the King Long Kaige is controversial as they heavily resemble the fifth generation Toyota HiAce (H200) with similar body styles and overall vehicle dimensions. The King Long Kaige are among the various Chinese vans from domestic brands that chose to replicate the Toyota HiAce H200 vans with only minor styling differences. Other brands include government owned manufacturers including Jinbei and Foton.
