= Joylong A-series =

Chinese series of commercial vans

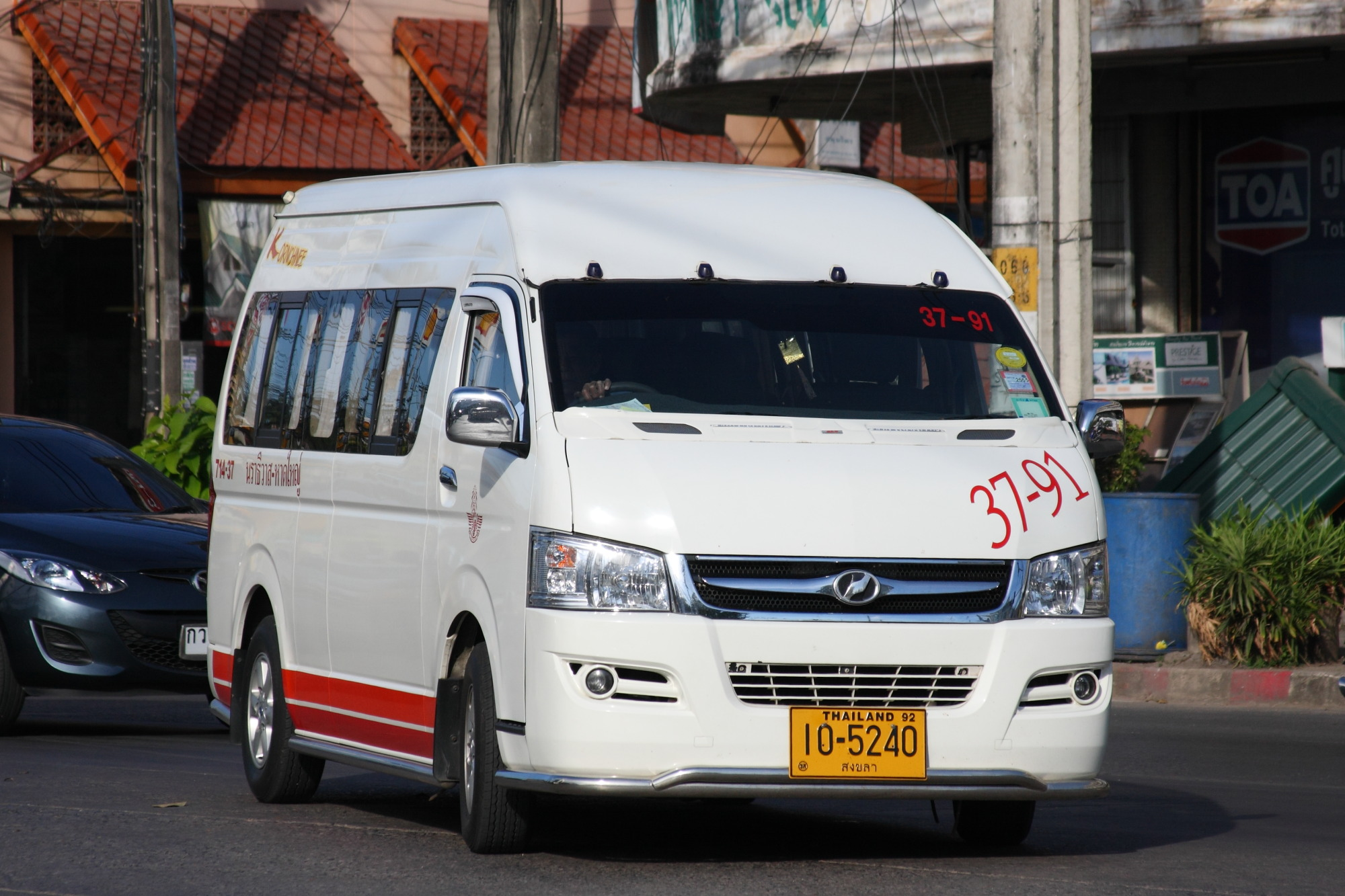

Overview
- Also called: Joylong A4; Joylong A5; Joylong A6; Joylong A5S; Joylong ARV; Joylong VIP-A; Joylong A6E; Joylong V300; Joylong EW4; Joylong EW5; Joylong E6; Evion E6 (South Korea, 2018-2025)
- Production: 2009 – present
- Assembly: China: Suzhou, Jiangsu (Zhangjiagang Light-Duty Passenger Automobile Factory Co., Ltd.)

Body and chassis
- Body style: 3-door van/minibus; 4-door van/minibus
- Layout: Engine Version; Front-engine, rear-wheel-drive; Electric Version; Rear-motor, rear-wheel-drive
- Related: King Long Kaige; Toyota HiAce

Powertrain
- Engine: Petrol; 2.0 L Isuzu 4GA1-2 Turbo I4; 2.2 L JM491Q-ME I4; 2.4 L XCE 4RB2 / 4G69 I4; 2.7 L XCE 3TZ I4; Diesel; 2.5 L SC25R Turbodiesel I4; 2.8 L ISF2.8S4148T / SC28R / JE4D28A Turbodiesel I4; 3.0 L 1KD-FTV Turbodiesel I4
- Electric motor: 50–70 kW (68.0–95.2 PS; 67.1–93.9 hp) Permanent Magnet motor
- Transmission: 5-speed manual; 4 speed automatic
- Battery: 64.8 – 86.1 kWh Lithium-Ion

Dimensions
- Wheelbase: 2,570 mm (101.2 in) (A4); 3,110 mm (122.4 in) (A5); 3,720 mm (146.5 in) (A6)
- Length: 4,840 mm (190.6 in) (A4); 5,380 mm (211.8 in) (A5); 5,990 mm (235.8 in) (A6)
- Width: 1,880 mm (74.0 in)
- Height: 2,080 mm (81.9 in) (A4); 2,285 mm (90.0 in) (A5); 2,320 mm (91.3 in) (A6)

The Joylong A-series is a series of light commercial van produced by the Chinese automobile manufacturer Jiangte Joylong Automobile.

== Overview ==
First launched in 2009, the Joylong A-series has since been available in a wide range of body configurations, including a minivan/MPV, minibus, and panel van. Variants include the Joylong A4, Joylong A5, Joylong A5S, Joylong A6, Joylong ARV, and Joylong VIP-A as well as the Joylong A6E, Joylong V300, Joylong EW4, and Joylong EW5 electric versions, with the ARV and VIP-A being luxurious camper versions and the V300, EW4, and EW5 being panel cargo van versions.

== Joylong A4 ==
The Joylong A4 is the base version of the whole series, featuring a standard wheelbase and a low roof. The Joylong A4 comes standard with 12 seats in 2-3-3-4 configuration.

The Joylong A4 engine options include both gasoline and diesel engines. The gasoline engine options of the A4 can be equipped with engine sizes of 2.2L and 2.4L. Its diesel engine options of the A4 is a 2.5L engine option.

The suspension setup of the Joylong A4 is double wishbone independent suspension for the front and variable rate leaf spring for the rear.

Prices of the Joylong A4 ranges from 121,800 yuan to 178,800 yuan.

A version of the Joylong A4 featuring a standard wheel base with a high roof called the Joylong Grand MPV was also available briefly, ranging from 129,800 yuan to 168,800 yuan.

== Joylong A5 ==
The Joylong A5 is the long wheel base high roof version of the A4 equipped with 14 seats.

The Joylong A5 engine options include both gasoline and diesel engines. The gasoline engine options of the A5 can be equipped with engine sizes of 2.0L and 2.7L. Its diesel engine options of the A5 is a 2.8L turbo engine.

Prices of the Joylong A5 ranges from 147,800 yuan to 216,000 yuan.

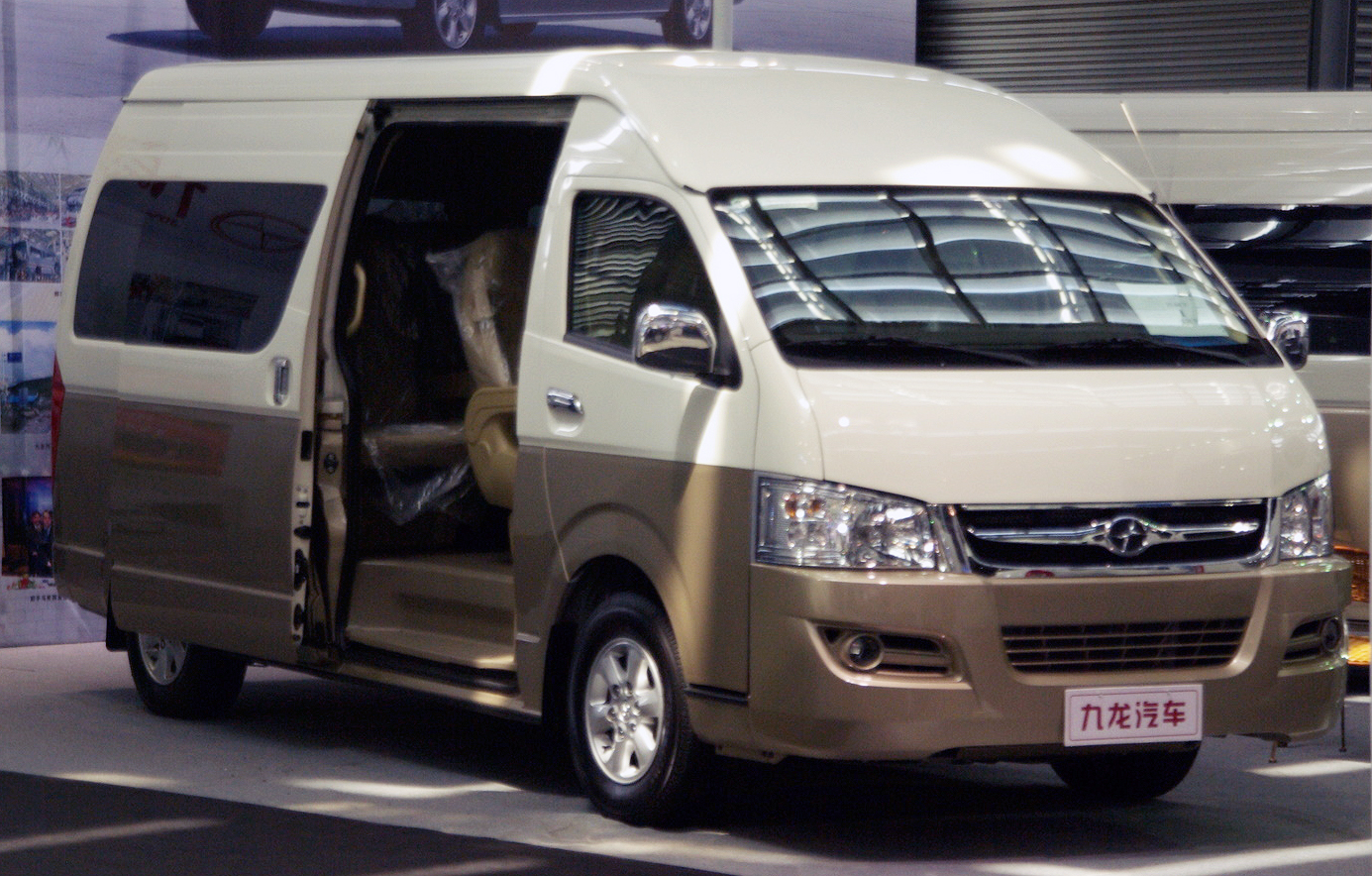
2011 (Jiangsu) Joylong A5 (HKL6540)

== Joylong A6 ==
The Joylong A6 is the extra long wheel base high roof version of the A4 equipped with 10 to 18 seats.

The Joylong A6 engine options include both gasoline and diesel engines and an extra A6E electric version. The gasoline engine options of the A6 can be equipped with engine sizes of 2.0L and 2.7L. Its diesel engine options of the A6 is either a 2.8L turbo or 3.0L turbo engine.

Prices of the Joylong A6 ranges from 99,800 yuan to 272,800 yuan.

Korean version are rebadged as Evion E6 from 2018 to 2025.

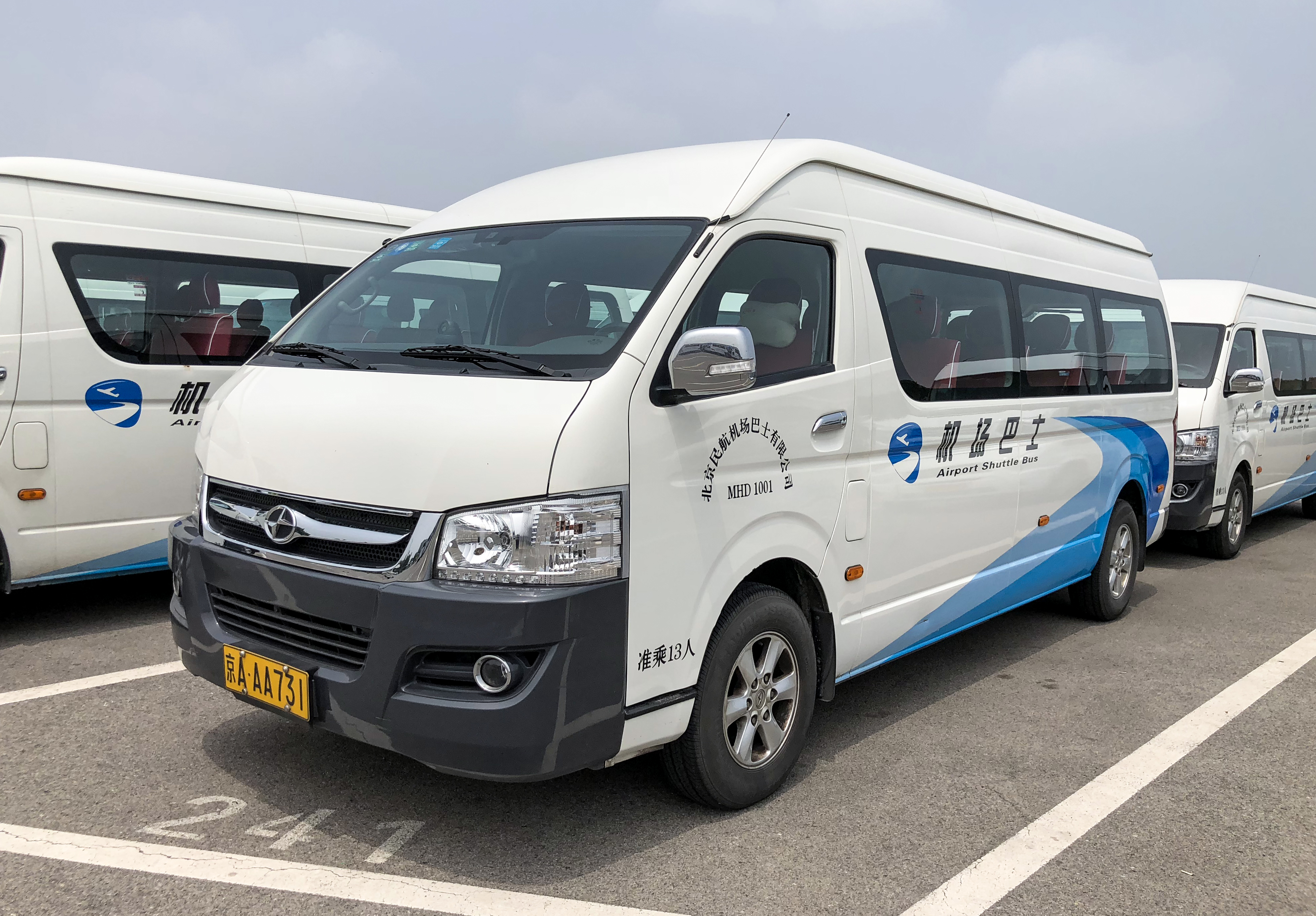
Joylong A6 airport shuttle

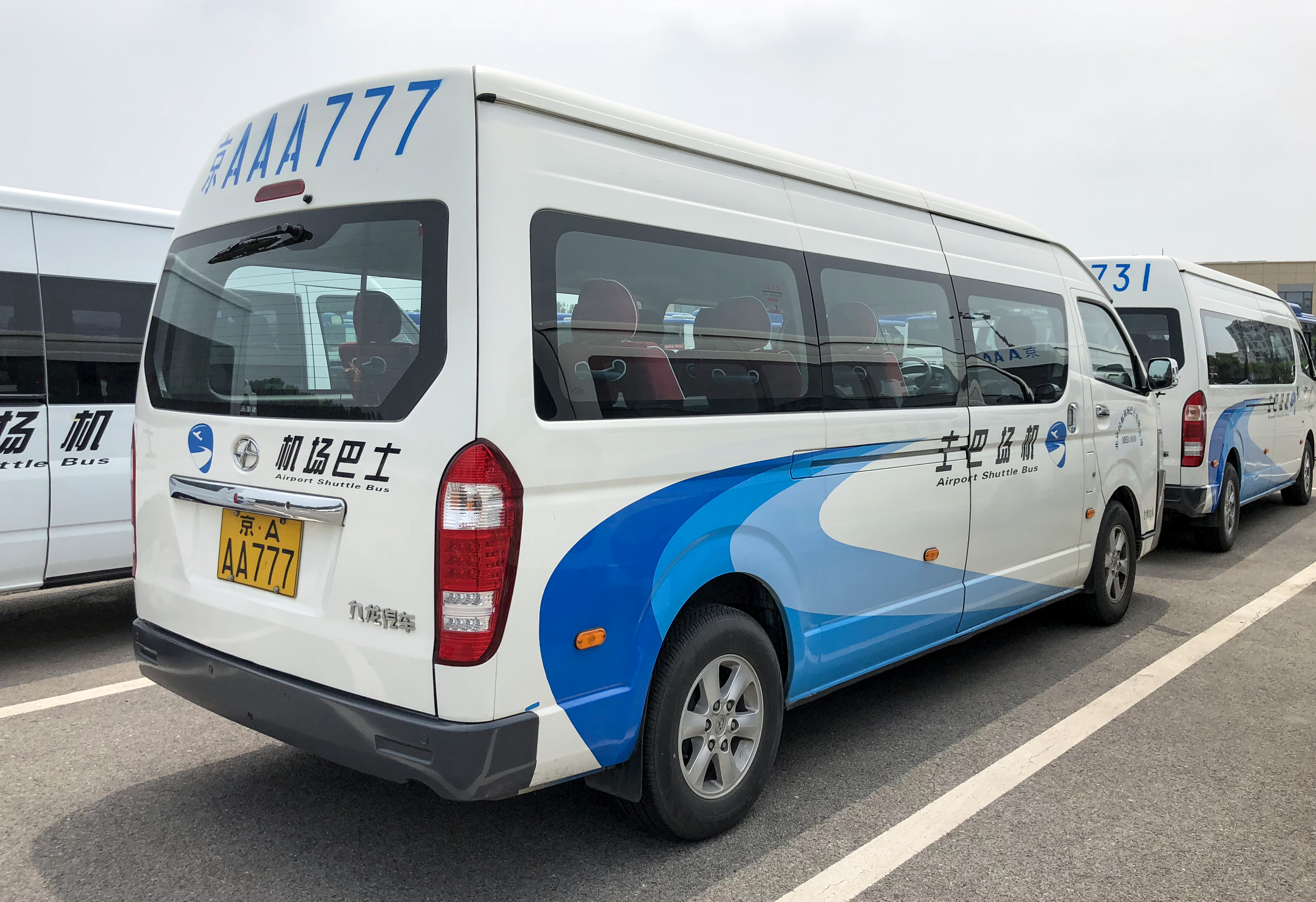
Joylong A6 airport shuttle (rear)

== Joylong V300/ Joylong EW4/ Joylong EW5 ==
The Joylong V300, Joylong EW4 and Joylong EW5 are electric panel cargo van variants of the Joylong A-series created for the logistics industry. The A6 electric variant of the A-series was launched in 2015, and is powered by a 70 kW and 400Nm electric motor developing 95 hp. As of 2021, only the A6 is available, as the electric panel van variants are only offered as fleets.

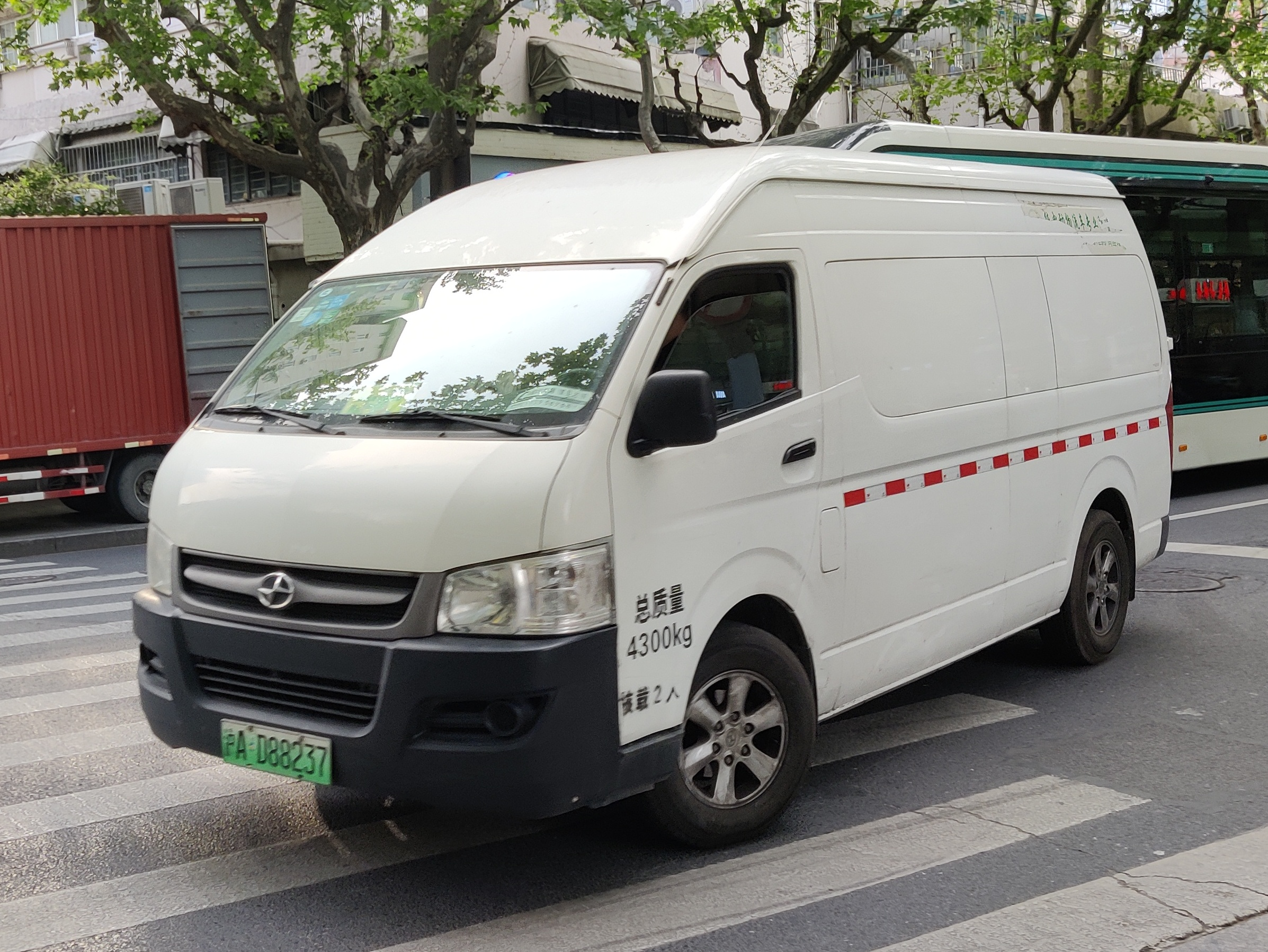
Joylong A-series electric panel van

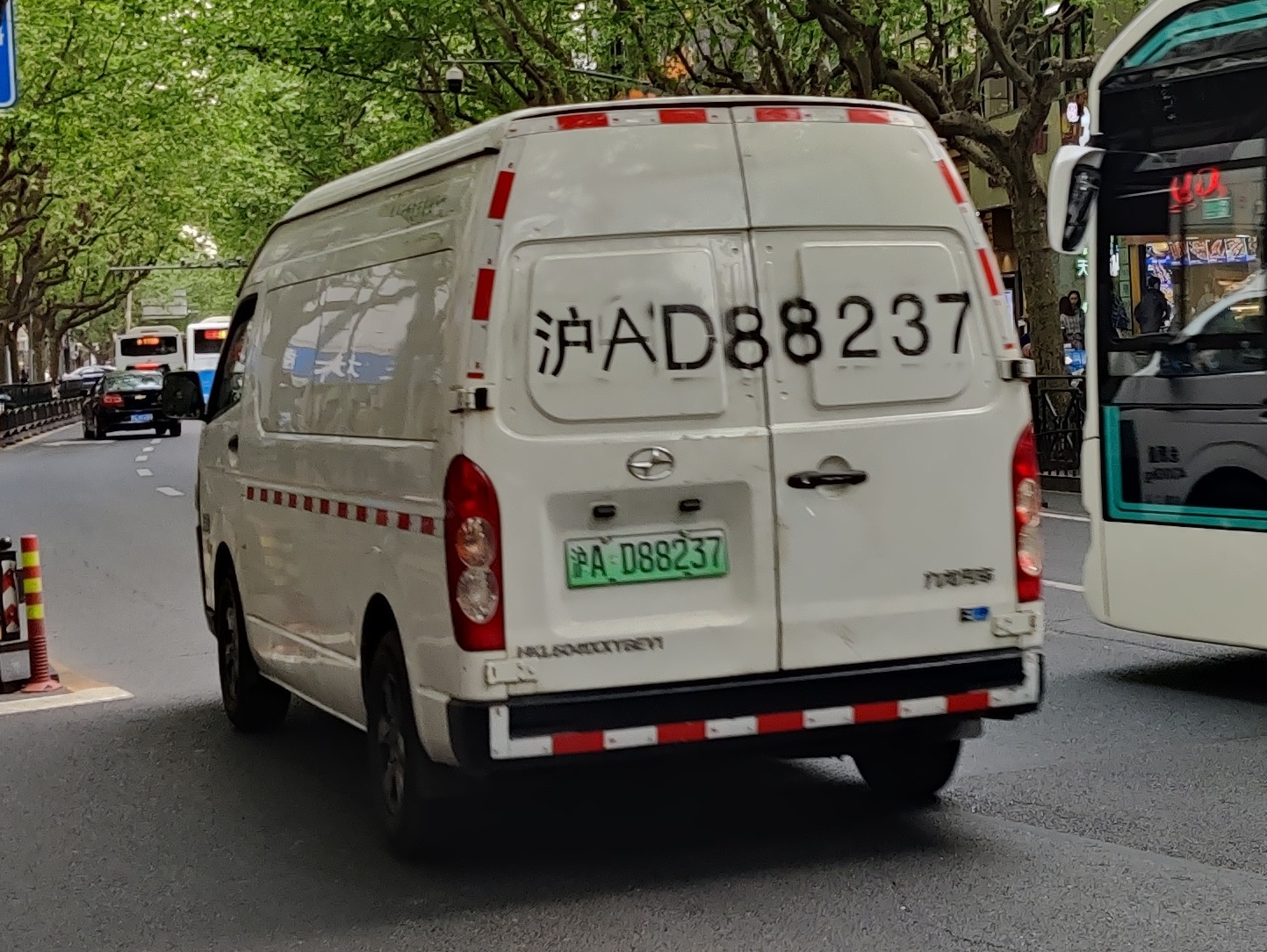
Joylong A-series electric panel van (rear)

== Joylong E6 ==
A few years ago, Joylong locally sold a 20-seater people carrier called the Majestic, which was a complete clone of the previous-generation Toyota Hiace.

Now, it has come to our attention that the Chinese manufacturer hasn't stopped making the van. And in fact, they even came up with an all-electric variant, and here it is. The Joylong E6.

When you look at it, it's still a complete copy of the high-roof version of the Hiace from the inside out. They only slightly changed the headlights and taillights just to have some kind of distinction, if there's any. In Australia, the E6 is available in a 12 and 14-seater configuration.

But in terms of powertrain, here's where the E6 is unique. The van is powered by a 60 kW (or 82 PS) water-cooled electric motor coupled to an 86.1 kWh battery pack. Joylong says they placed the battery pack of the E6 in a central position under the van's floor, giving it a low center of gravity which makes it less prone to body roll. In addition, according to Joylong's Australian website, the E6 has a city range of 300 km and a highway range of 280 km.

== Design controversies ==
The exterior styling and dimensions of the Joylong A-series is controversial as the exterior design of the A-series heavily resembles the fifth generation Toyota HiAce. Despite the licensing and cooperation between Toyota and multiple Chinese auto manufacturers on producing licensed and rebadged HiAce vans, Joylong has never worked with Toyota for the development and production of the A-series vans, making the Joylong A-series an unlicensed copy of the Toyota van.
