= Keyton V60 =

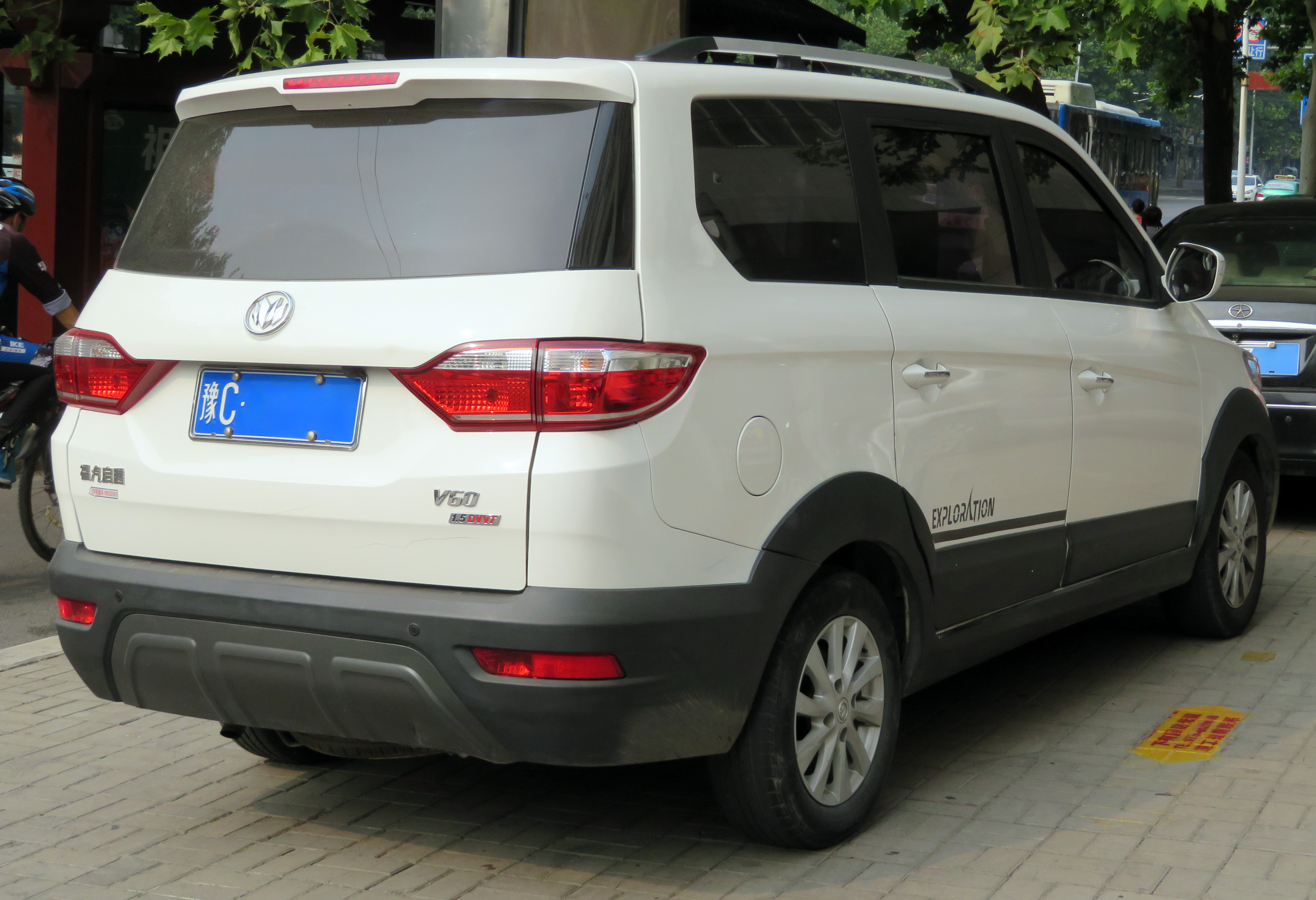

Overview
- Manufacturer: Keyton
- Also called: Keyton X7
- Production: 2015
- Assembly: Fujian, China

Body and chassis
- Class: Compact Crossover MPV (M)
- Body style: 5-door station wagon
- Doors: 5
- Related: Keyton EX80

Powertrain
- Engine: 1.2L, 1.5L

Dimensions
- Wheelbase: 2,721 mm (107.1 in)
- Length: 4,505 mm (177.4 in)
- Width: 1,730 mm (68.1 in)
- Height: 1,788 mm (70.4 in)

The Keyton V60 (Chinese: 启腾V60) is a compact crossover MPV made by Keyton built on the same platform as the Keyton EX80. It was released in late 2015.

== Description ==
The Keyton V60 has 5 doors and 7 seats. Being based on the same platform as the Keyton EX80, the V60 has dimensions of 4,505 mm × 1,730 mm × 1,788 mm (177.4 in × 68.1 in × 70.4 in), and a wheelbase of 2,721 mm (107.1 in).

=== Models ===
The Keyton V60 comes in 3 trim levels: comfort, luxury, and noble. The comfort model costs 56,900 yuan, luxury costs 62,900 yuan, and the noble model costs 66,900 yuan.

=== Powertrain ===
The V60 can be configured with either a 1.2 liter or a 1.5 liter engine, and the V60 has a 150 km/h top speed.

== Rebadged Models ==
=== Keyton X7 ===
The Keyton X7 was a rebadged model of the V60. It had the same configurations, the only difference being larger tires.

=== Keyton EX7 ===
In 2018, an electric-powered variant was launched called the Keyton EX7. The EX7 is a pure electric battery electric vehicle that runs on a 60 kW motor, while sharing the same body and configurations as the V60. Its main export destination is Brazil and other South American countries

== See also ==
- Keyton EX80
