= Jiangte Joylong Automobile =

Chinese bus manufacturer

Jiangte Joylong Automobile 江苏九龙汽车制造有限公司
- Official Chinese logo
- Industry: Automotive
- Founded: 2007
- Headquarters: Shanghai, China
- Area served: Worldwide
- Products: Vans; Buses
- Production output: Yangzhou City, Jiangsu Province.
- Website: Joylong Automobile
- Footnotes; Official Website

Joylong Automobile (officially Jiangsu Joylong Automobile Co., Ltd.), is a Chinese automobile and bus manufacturer based in Shanghai. It was established in 2007. Sales mainly cover Asian, Middle Eastern, South American, and African countries.

== History ==
The company was founded in 2007 in Yangzhou, Jiangsu Province.

== Models ==
Joylong produces MPVs, vans, and minibuses. The following is a list of vehicles produced by the company:

=== MPVs ===
- EM3, a mini electric MPV
- EM5, a compact electric MPV
- iFly, a minivan
  - EF5, an electric version of the iFly
  - EF9, an electric version of the iFly

=== Vans (A-series) ===
- A-Series, a passenger and cargo van series:
  - A4, a passenger variant
    - EW4, an electric version of the A4
  - A5, a long wheelbase passenger variant
    - EW5, an electric version of the A5
  - A6, an extra long wheelbase passenger variant
  - ARV, a camper variant
  - V300, a cargo variant
  - VIP-A, a luxury variant

=== Minibuses (C-series) ===
- C-series, a minibus series
  - C6, a minibus
- HKL6700, a copy of the Toyota Coaster

== Product Gallery ==
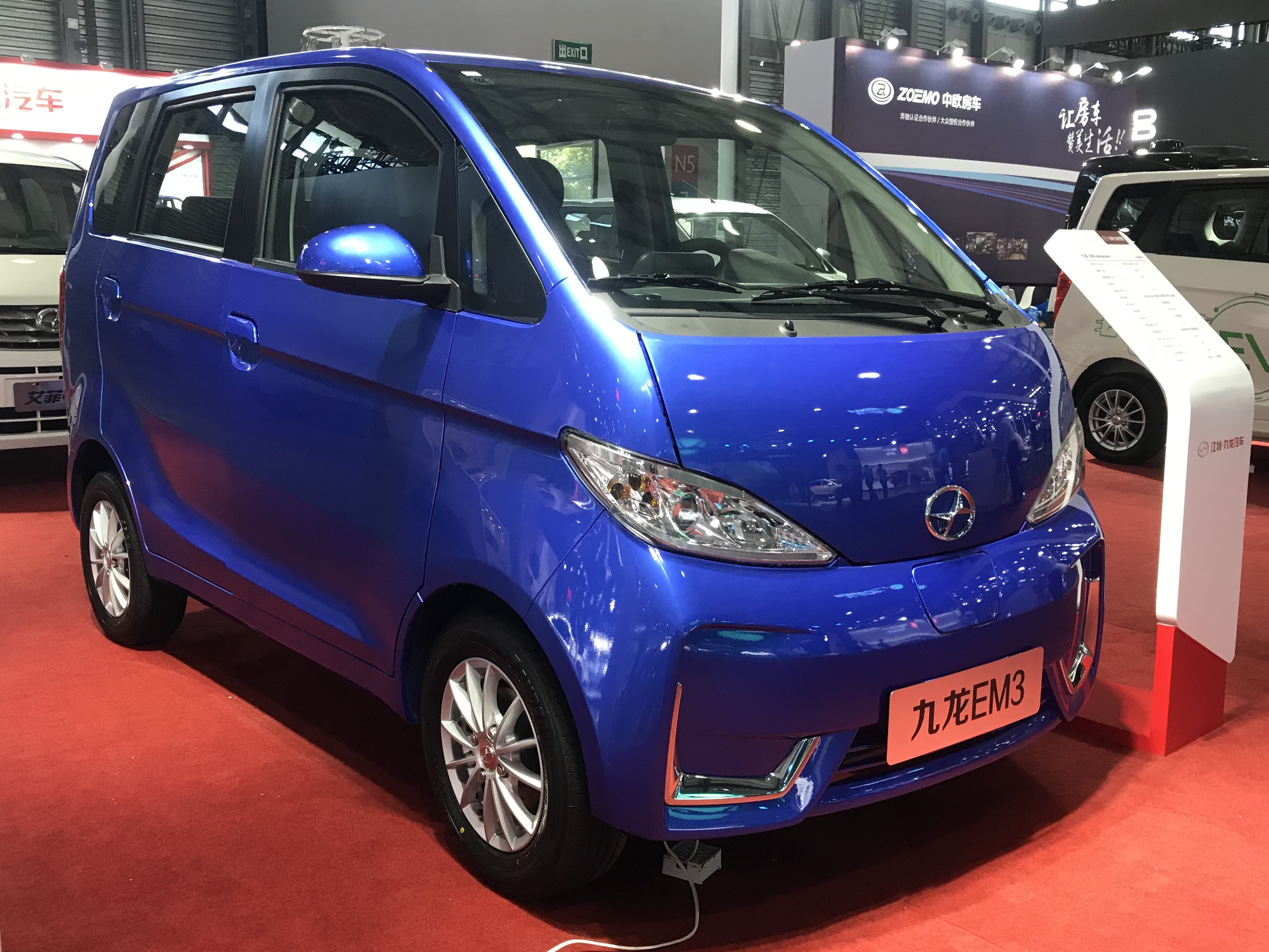
Joylong EM3

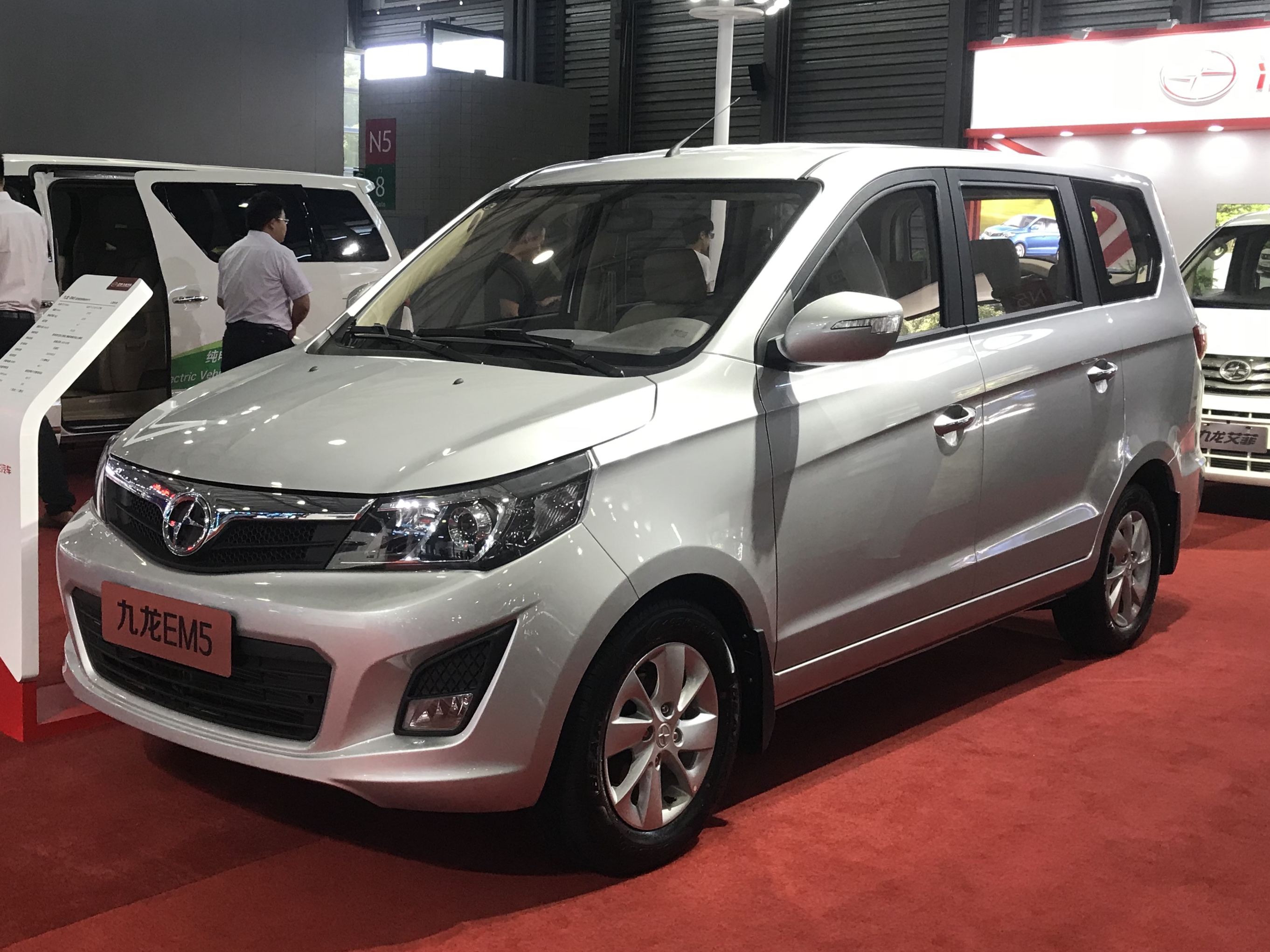
Joylong EM5

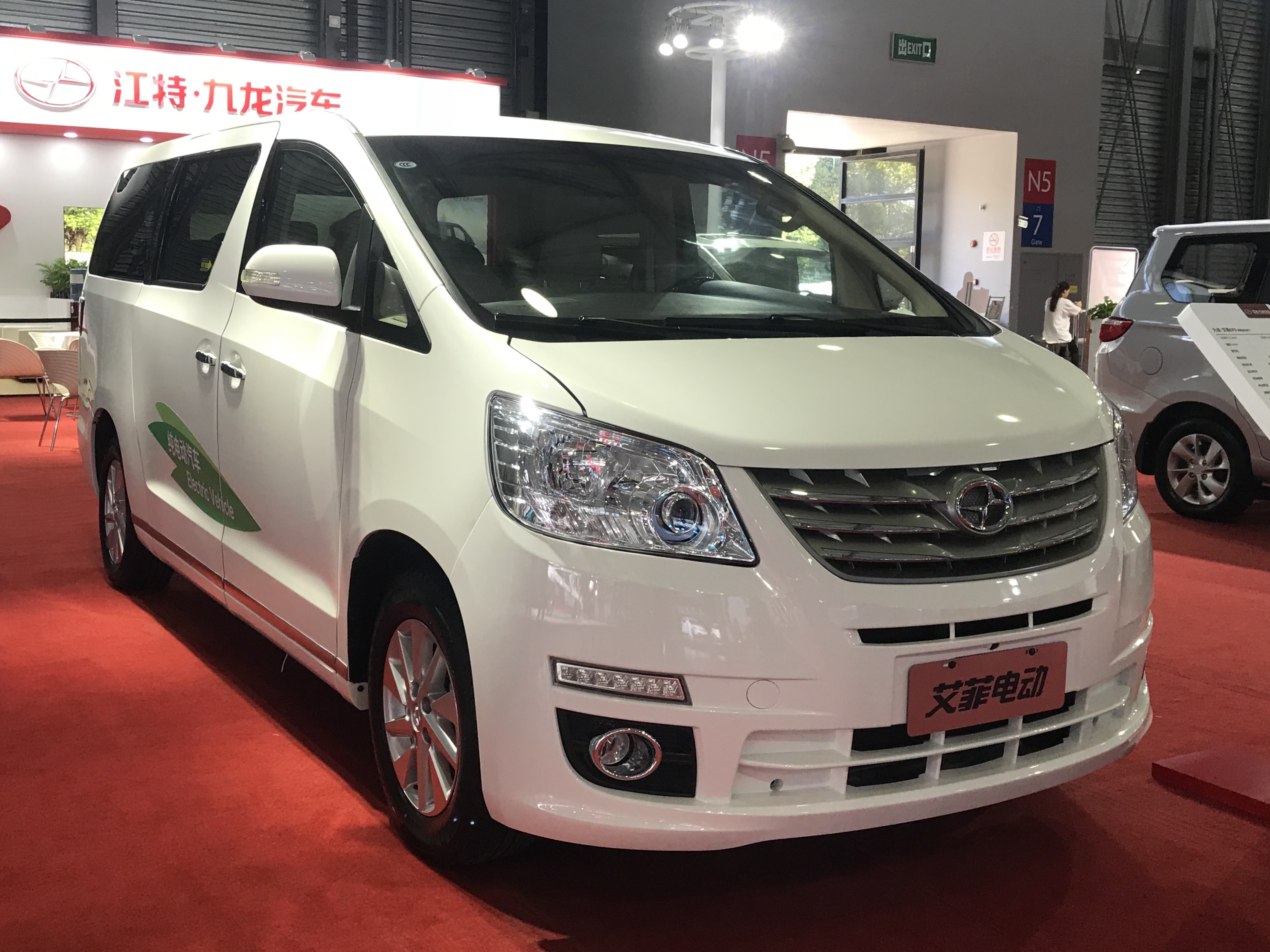
Joylong iFly

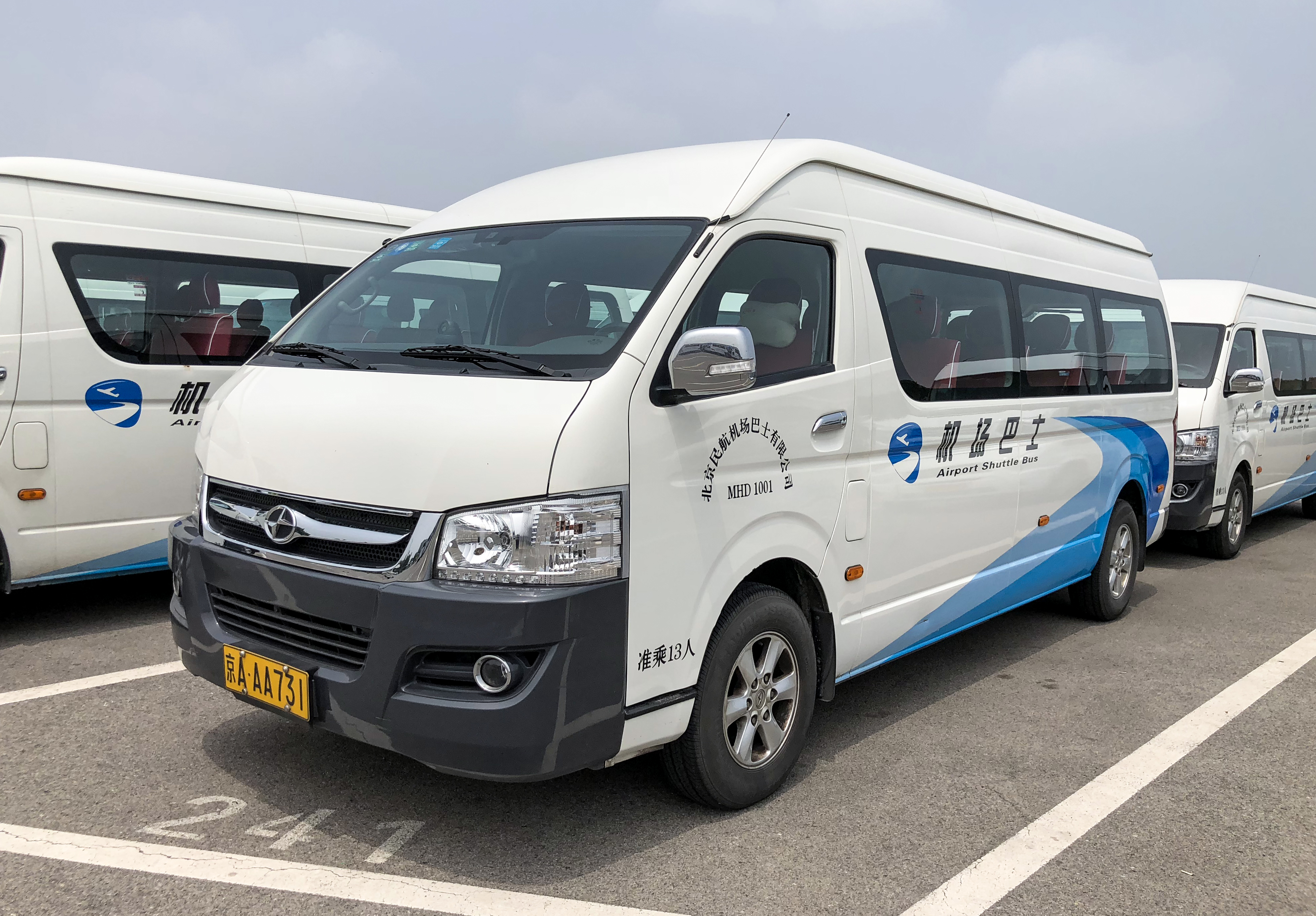
Joylong A series passenger van

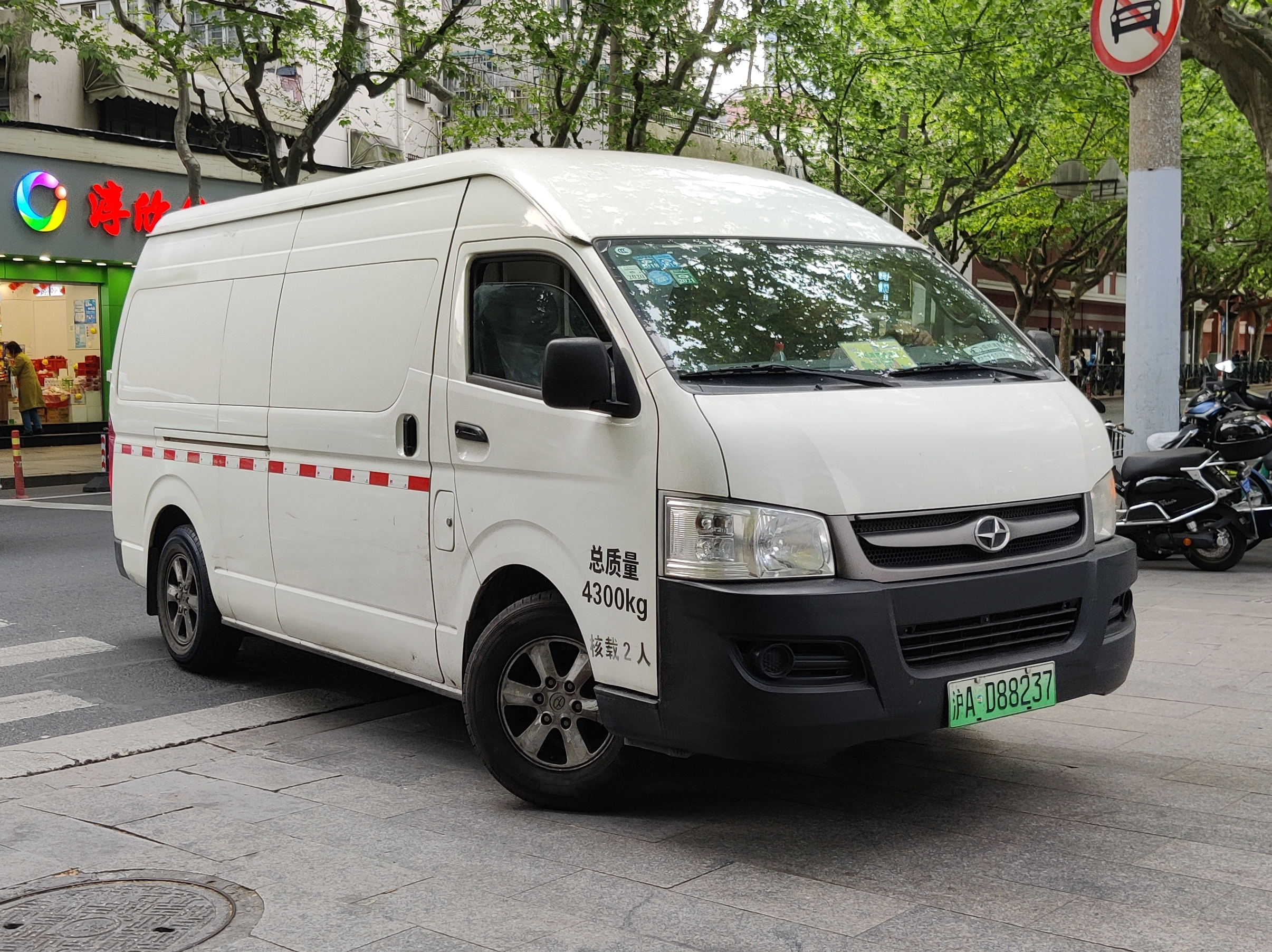
Joylong A series electric panel van
