= Joylong EM3 =

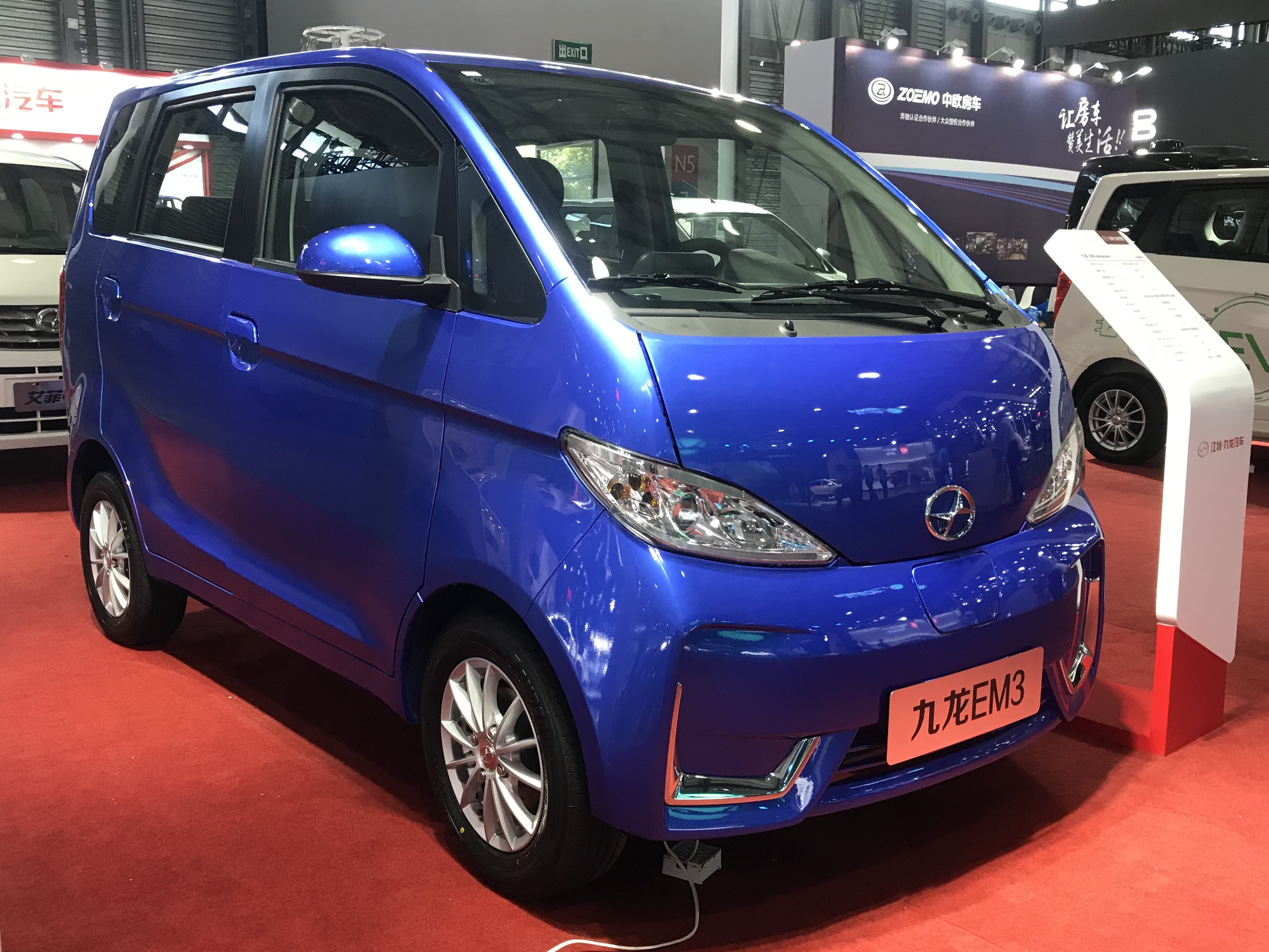

Overview
- Manufacturer: Joylong
- Production: 2019
- Assembly: China

Body and chassis
- Class: City car (A-segment)
- Body style: 5-door hatchback
- Doors: 5

Dimensions
- Wheelbase: 2,100 mm (82.7 in)
- Length: 3,180 mm (125.2 in)
- Width: 1,495 mm (58.9 in)
- Height: 1,720 mm (67.7 in)
- Curb weight: 1155 kg

The Joylong EM3 (Chinese: 九龙EM3) is an electric city car made by Joylong.

== Overview ==
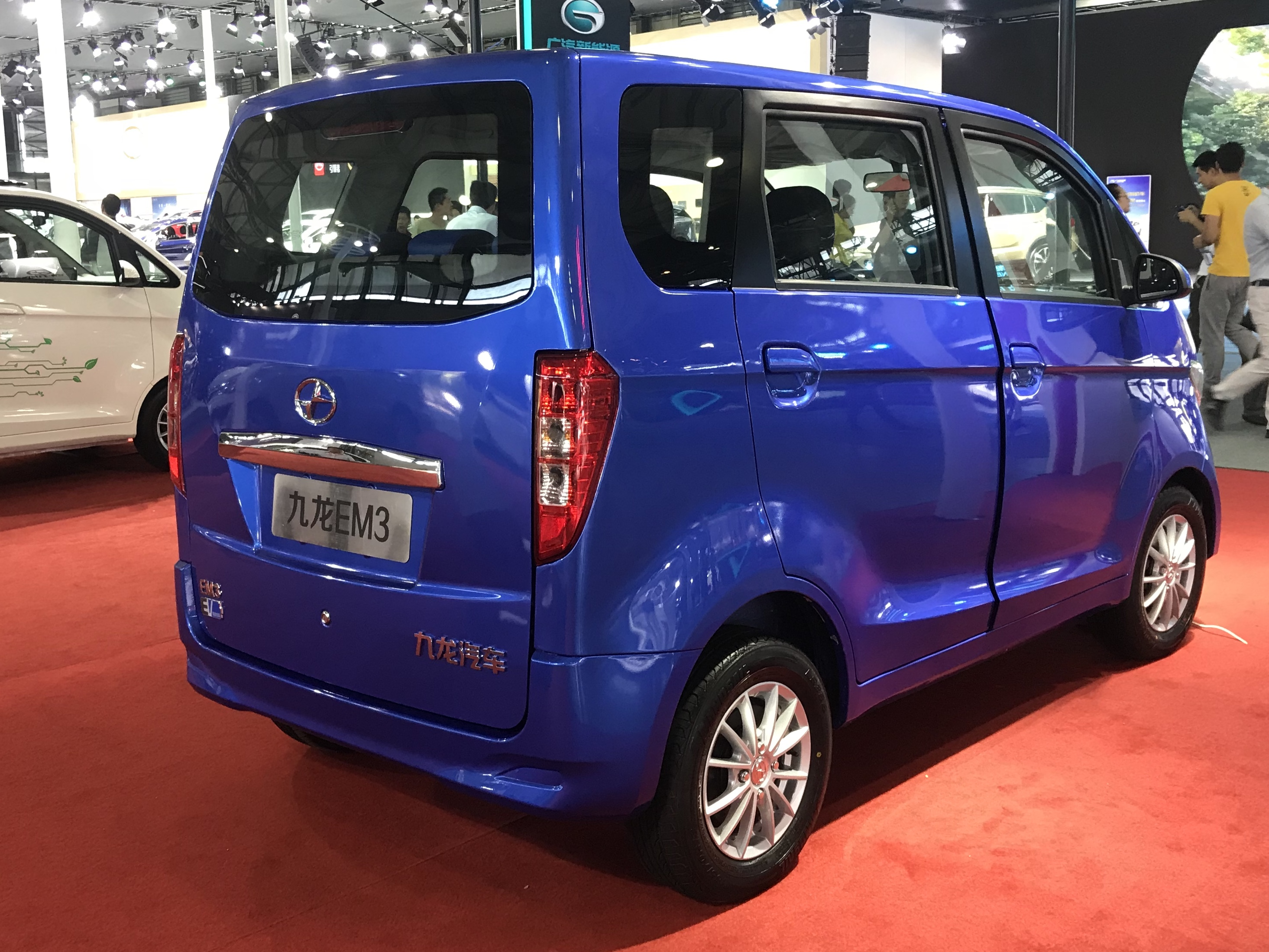

The Joylong EM3 was shown in 2019. It has dimensions of 3180 mm/1495 mm/1720 mm, a wheelbase of 2100 mm, and a weight of 1155 kg. The EM3 has 5 doors and 5 seats, and will be priced from $10,000 to $20,000.

=== Performance ===
The Joylong EM3 has an electric motor that develops 40 hp and 150 Nm, good for an 80 km/h top speed. Range is 380 kilometers. Charging takes 12.5 hours with an onboard charger or 2 hours.

== Solar Powered ==
A solar powered EM3 concept was launched by Hanergy. It had a 60% battery charge that held for 8 days, and could run on full battery without being charged for 30 days.

== See also ==
- Joylong
- Hanergy
