= ChangJiang EV =

Chinese automobile manufacturer

ChangJiang
- Type: Private
- Industry: Automotive
- Founded: 2007
- Founder: Cao Zhong
- Defunct: 2020
- Website: http://www.changjiangev.com/

Chang Jiang EV (Chinese: 长江), also called Yangtze Motor (扬子江), was a Chinese automobile manufacturer headquartered in Zhejiang Province, Hangzhou, China, specializing in developing electric vehicles.

== History ==
ChangJiang was founded in 2015 and had been based in Hangzhou, China. It was a division of FDG Electric Vehicles. They had two R&D centers, a battery manufacturing plant, and vehicle assembly plants. The main factory is in Hangzhou while the smaller one is in Kunming. ChangJiang also had a plant in America, which came by way of partnering with Smith Electric Vehicles. On April 17, 2016, ChangJiang created the brand ChangJiang EV (Chinese: 长江-EV).

An older brand, the Chang'an ChangJiang brand, started in the 1950s. The first vehicle was the Chang'an ChangJiang 46. It was produced from 1959 to 1963, but only 3,000 were made. It was created by Xu Guangqi. It weighed 1150 kg, had a maximum load of 440 kg, 2.2 litre 4-cylinder water-cooled 4-stroke carburetor engine, and could seat 6. In 1963, the tools for the vehicles were shipped across the Yangtze River, so a new factory in Beijing could open. However, the boat tipped, and the tools were lost, which ended production of the 46. The company then turned into Beijing Auto Works. One 46 remains today in Chongqing.

Due to the COVID-19 pandemic, ChangJiang filed for bankruptcy in August 2020, and underwent liquidation. ChangJiang sold 1,000 vehicles in 2020, and hasn't paid their staff since late 2019.

== Vehicles ==
=== Models ===
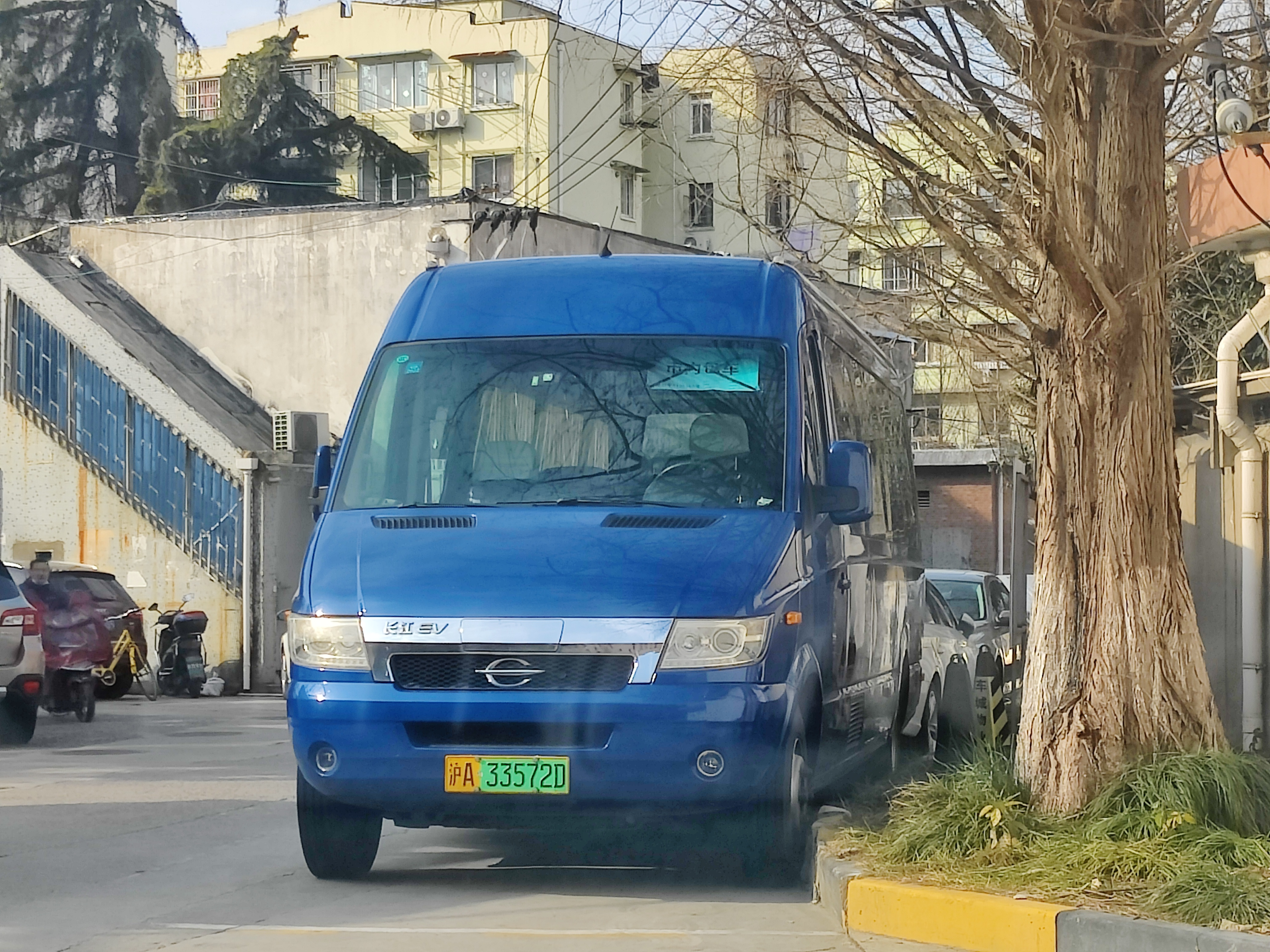
Changjiang Yisheng

ChangJiang had 17 public-use production vehicles.

==== ChangJiang E60/E260 ====
The ChangJiang E60, also called the E260, is a compact hatchback produced from 2019 to 2020. It uses a 25kWh motor and takes 7.7 hours to charge. It has 5 doors and 4 seats, and has a 37 kWh battery. It weighs 1290 kg.

==== ChangJiang 360e ====
The ChangJiang 360e is a compact sedan made in 2016 based on the Lifan 650. It uses a 100 kW motor. The 360e has 5 doors and 4 seats. Its dimensions are 4625 mm/1715 mm/1510 mm, and has a kerb weight of 1,850 kg.

==== ChangJiang SM01 ====
The ChangJiang SM01 is a box truck.

==== ChangJiang SM07 ====
The ChangJiang SM07 is a box truck.

==== ChangJiang SP04 ====
The ChangJiang SP04 is a cargo van based on the Jinbei Haise X30L.

==== ChangJiang SP06 ====
The ChangJiang SP06 is a full-size van based on the Skywell D11 by Nanjing Golden Dragon.

==== ChangJiang M04 ====
The ChangJiang M04 is a box truck made from 2018 to 2020. It uses a 40 kW-60 kW motor. It can hold 1.6 tons of cargo. It was shown at the 2018 Beijing Auto Show.

==== ChangJiang V08S/V8070 ====
The ChangJiang V08S, also called the ChangJiang V8070, is a cargo van made in 2017. The vehicles has been renamed by Chanje in 2018, and is called the Chanje V8070.

==== ChangJiang A1/A60 ====
The ChangJiang A1, also called the A60, is a SUV made from 2016 to 2020.

==== ChangJiang A2 ====
The ChangJiang A2 is a SUV made from 2016 to 2020.

==== ChangJiang A3 ====
The ChangJiang A3 is a large SUV produced from 2016 to 2020.

==== ChangJiang C1 ====
The ChangJiang C1 is a sports SUV made from 2016 to 2020.

==== ChangJiang C2 ====
The ChangJiang C2 is a wagon-style SUV made from 2016 to 2020.

==== ChangJiang eBoss ====
The ChangJiang eBoss is a minibus produced from 2016 to 2020. It can seat 10 to 25 people. It has a 130 hp motor and a 200 to 450-kilometer range.

==== ChangJiang eGlory ====
The ChangJiang eGlory is a cargo van produced from 2016 to 2020. It can set up to 20 people.

==== ChangJiang eCool ====
The ChangJiang eCool is a hatchback that was made from 2016 to 2020.

==== ChangJiang eZone ====
The ChangJiang eZone is a bus that was made from 2016 to 2020.

=== Service vehicles ===
==== Bus ====
- ChangJiang FDC6810TDABEV03
- ChangJiang FDC6600TDABEV02
- ChangJiang FDC6810TDABEV04
- ChangJiang FDC6750TDABEV03
- ChangJiang FDC6750TDABEV04
- ChangJiang FDC6850PBABEV02
- ChangJiang FDC6850PBABEV01
- ChangJiang FDC6120PDABEV01
- ChangJiang FDC6100PBABEV06
- ChangJiang FDC6120PDABEV02
- ChangJiang FDC6100PBABEV05
- ChangJiang CFC6110G3DK
- ChangJiang CJ6920G4QH
- ChangJiang CJ6101G2C11HK
- ChangJiang CJ6101G7C13HK
- ChangJiang CJ6922TC
- ChangJiang CJWG150
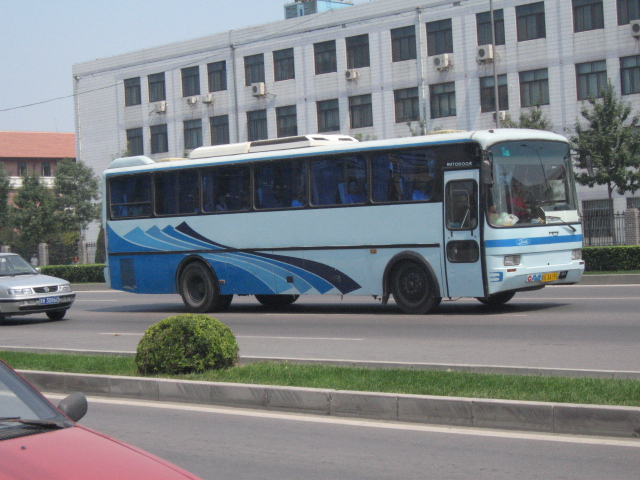
ChangJiang CFC6110G3DK

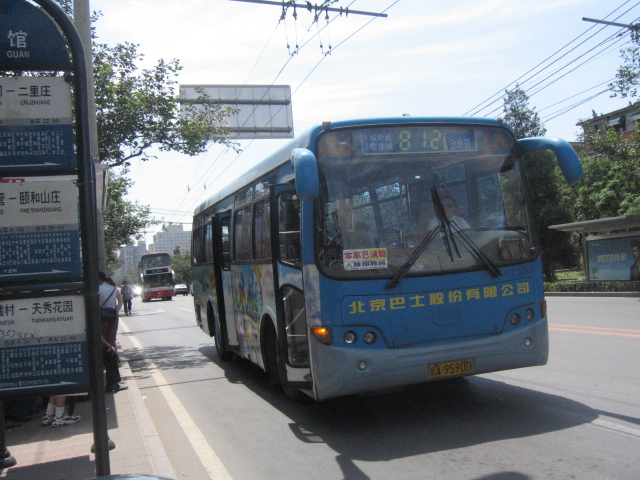
ChangJiang CJ6920G4QH

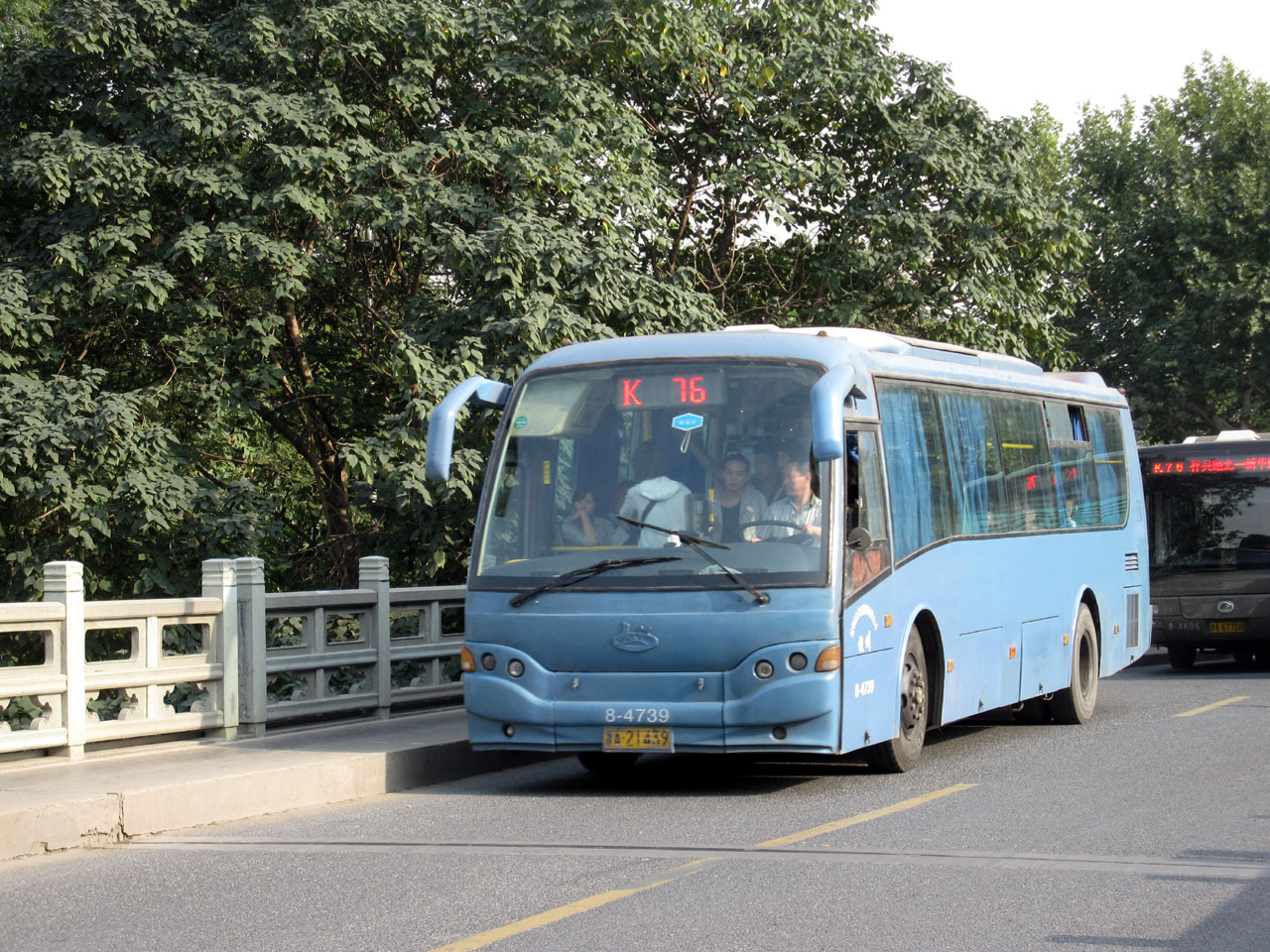
ChangJiang CJ6101G2C11HK

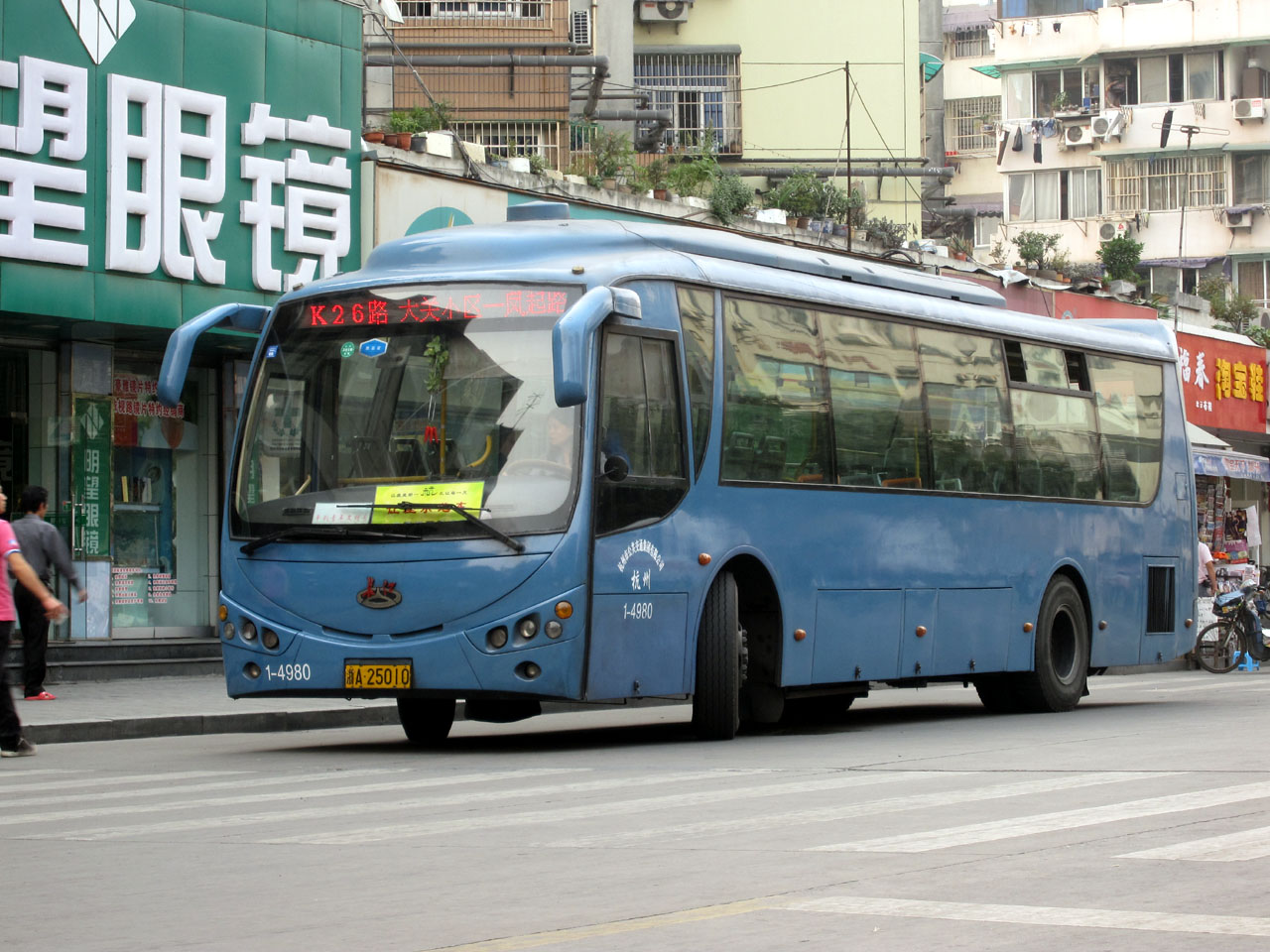
ChangJiang CJ6101G7C13HK

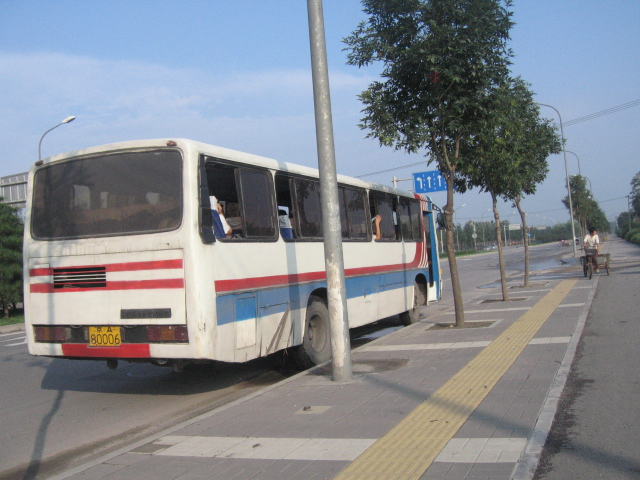
ChangJiang CJ6922TC

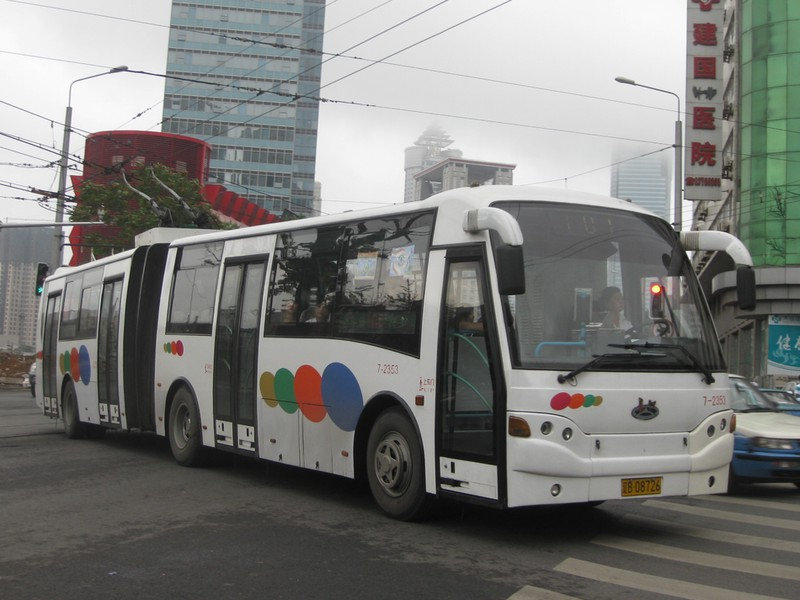
ChangJiang CJWG150

==== Cargo Van ====
- ChangJiang FDC5080XXYABEV02
- ChangJiang FDC5080XXYABEV01
- ChangJiang FDC5060XXYABEV01
- Yangtse WG5031XXYBEV
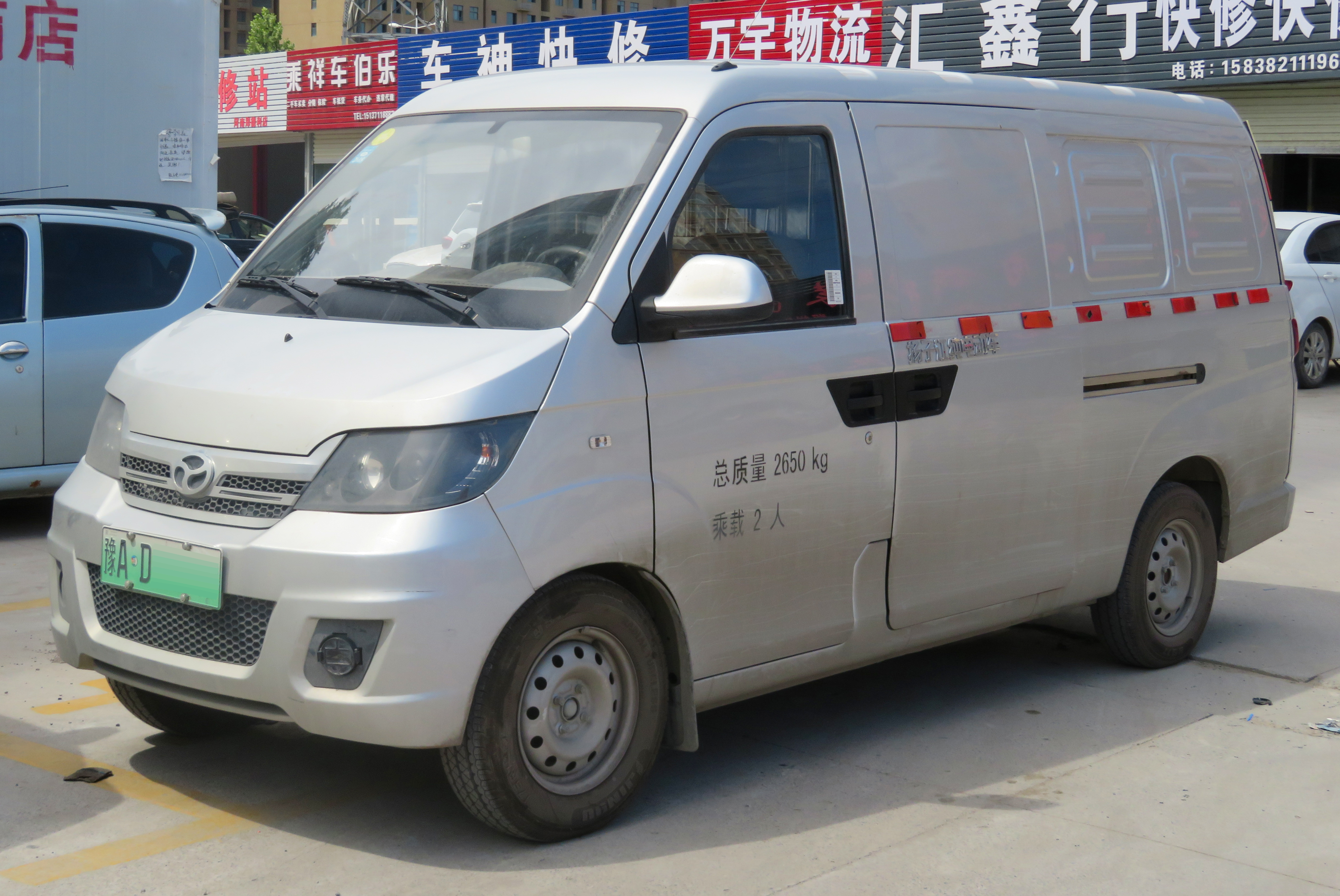
Yangtse WG5031XXYBEV

=== Concept vehicles ===
ChangJiang has 3 concept vehicles.

==== 2018 Beijing Auto Show ====
ChangJiang brought 3 concept vehicles to the 2018 Beijing Auto Show: the Concept #01, the Concept #02, and the Vincent Concept. The Concept #01, also called the Concept EV, has 4 doors and 5 seats. The Concept #02 has 2 doors, and has a range of 1000 kilometers. The Vincent Concept is a SUV and has 5 doors with 4 seats, with a range of 500 kilometers.

== See also ==
- Aoxin
- SiTech
