= King Long Jockey =

Chinese van

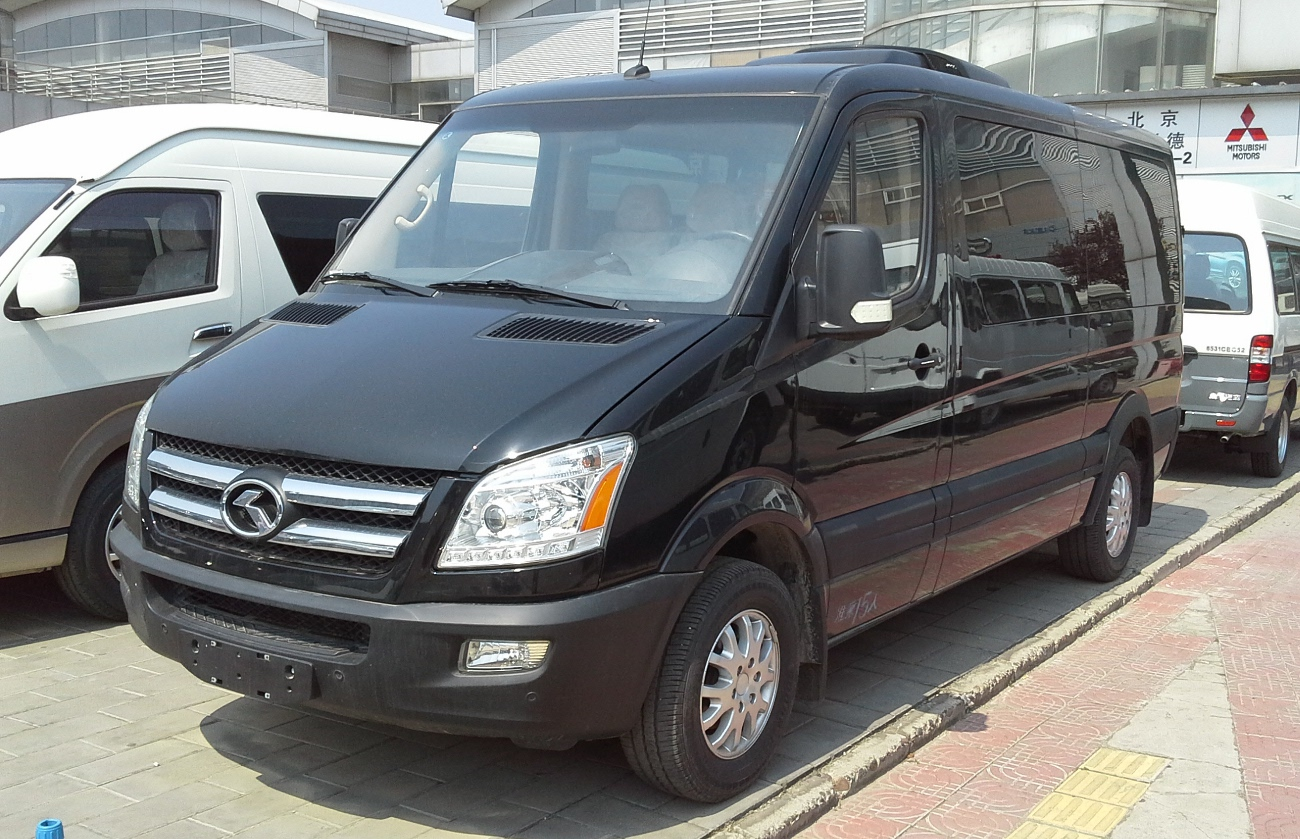

Overview
- Manufacturer: King Long
- Also called: King Long Saima; King Long Kaite (凯特); Tongxin (Changsha Meihua) TX5040XXYBEV; BAIC Changjiang BJEV BJ5040XXYCJ08EV; Kawei JNQ6605BEV
- Production: 2014–present
- Assembly: China: Xiamen, Fujian

Body and chassis
- Body style: 4-door van 4-door minibus
- Related: Skywell D11; Higer Paradise

Powertrain
- Engine: 2.8L I4 turbo Diesel engine 2.3L I4 turbo Diesel engine
- Transmission: 5-speed manual 6-speed manual

Dimensions
- Wheelbase: 3,665 mm (144.3 in)
- Length: 5,945 mm (234.1 in)
- Width: 2,040 mm (80.3 in)
- Height: 2,530 mm (99.6 in)–2,810 mm (110.6 in) (RV)

The King Long Jockey, King Long Saima, or King Long Kaite (Chinese: 凯特) is a light commercial vehicle (van) built by King Long from China as a van, chassis cab, Recreational vehicle, and minibus.

== Overview ==
The King Long Jockey was introduced in China in June 2014 with prices up to 236,000 yuan. Power of the King Long Jockey comes from either a 2.8 litre inline-four turbo diesel engine or a 2.3 litre inline-four turbo diesel engine.

== Development ==
In 2014, Fujian Automobile Industry Group gained control of the King Long Group and the large van body was made available to King Long, leading to the restyled and rebadged King Long Jockey with the designs heavily resembling the Mercedes-Benz Sprinter vans with identical body styles and overall vehicle dimensions. The King Long Jockey vans are among the various Chinese vans from domestic brands that chose to replicate the Mercedes-Benz Sprinter with only minor styling differences. Other brands include Higer and JAC.

== Badge engineered variants ==
The vehicle body of the King Long Jockey was shared across multiple companies including the related Higer Bus and other small manufacturers that specializes in light commercial vehicles due to company connections and shared toolings. A pure electric cargo van variant was produced by Changsha Meihua Automobile Manufacturing Co., Ltd. and sold as the Tongxin TX5040XXYBEV. Another variant was sold as the BAIC Changjiang BJ5040XXYCJ08EV by Changjiang EV. Yantai Shuchi (烟台舒驰) also produces electric cargo van variants based on the same vehicle body under the YTK5040XXYEV-series codename.

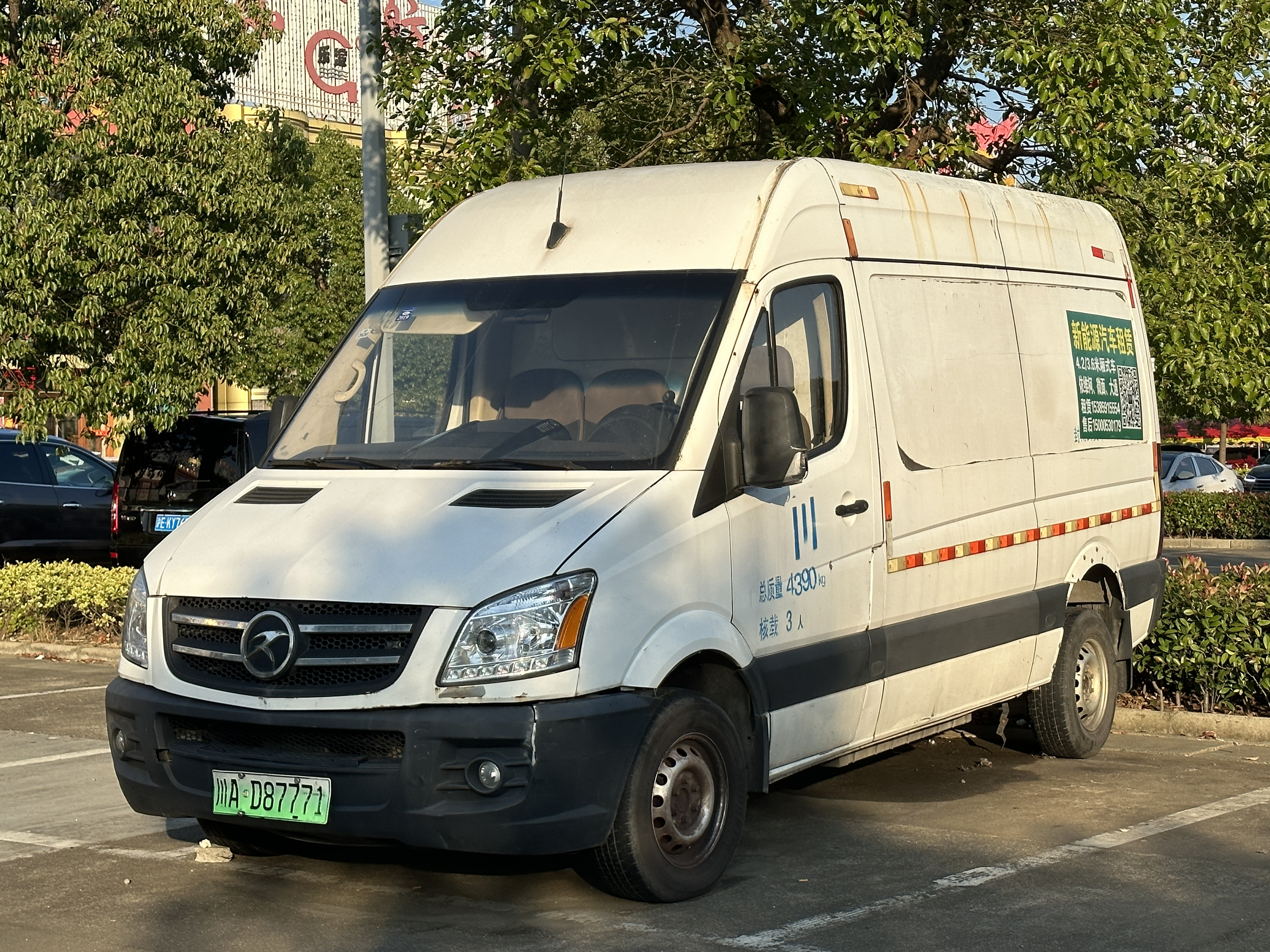
Changsha Meihua TX5040XXYBEV2 front

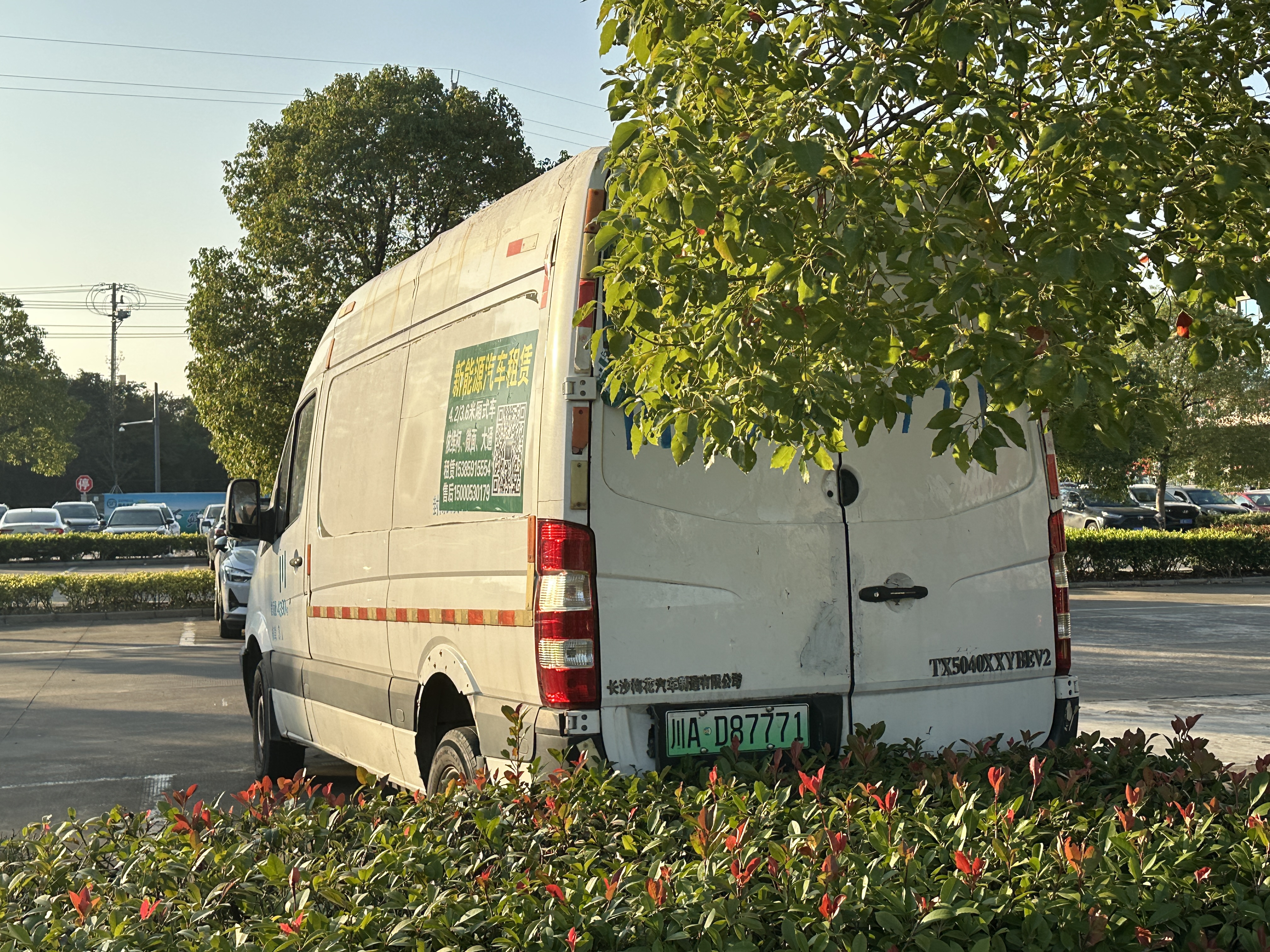
Changsha Meihua TX5040XXYBEV2 rear
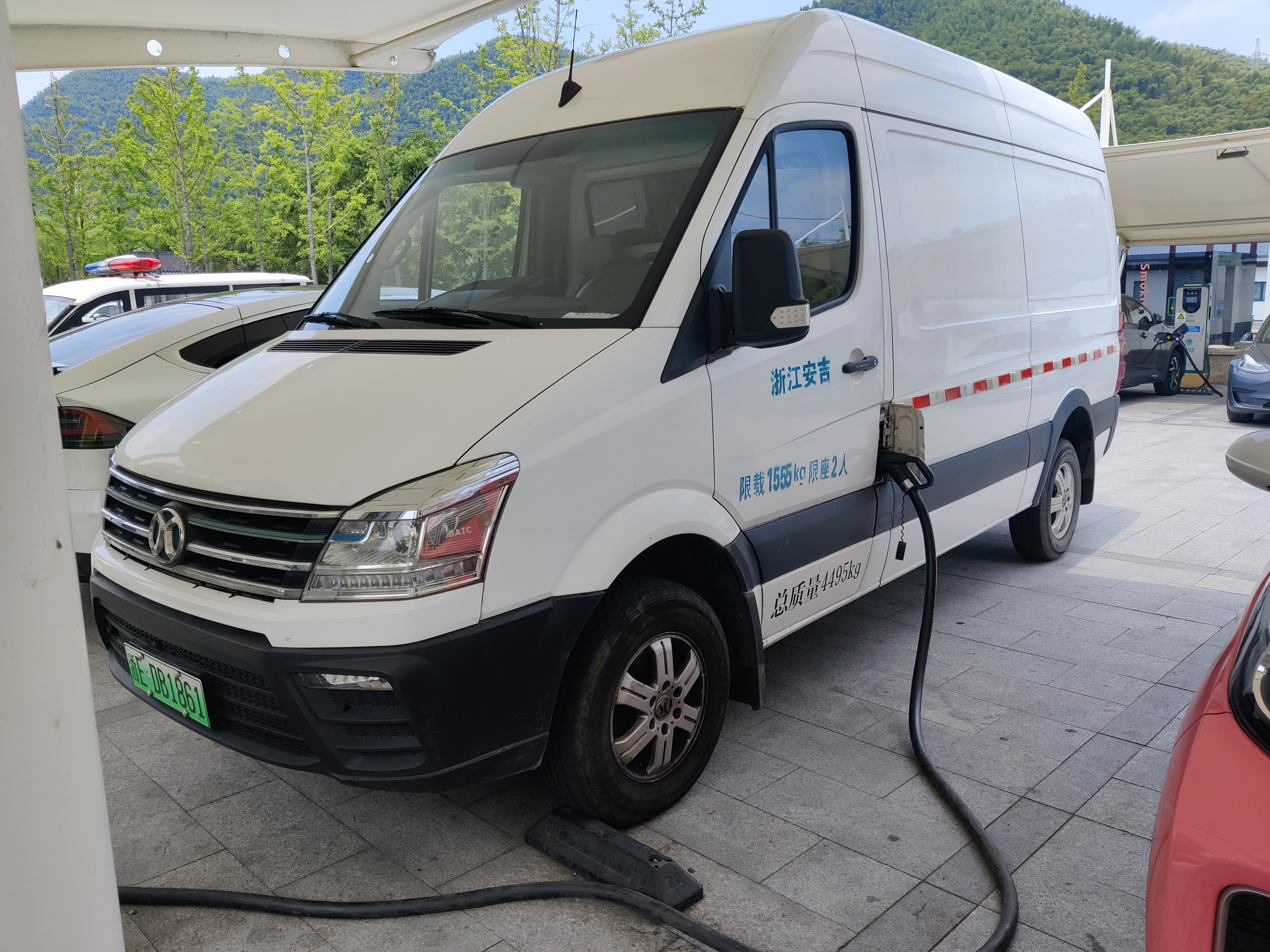
BAIC Changjiang BJ5040XXYCJ08EV front

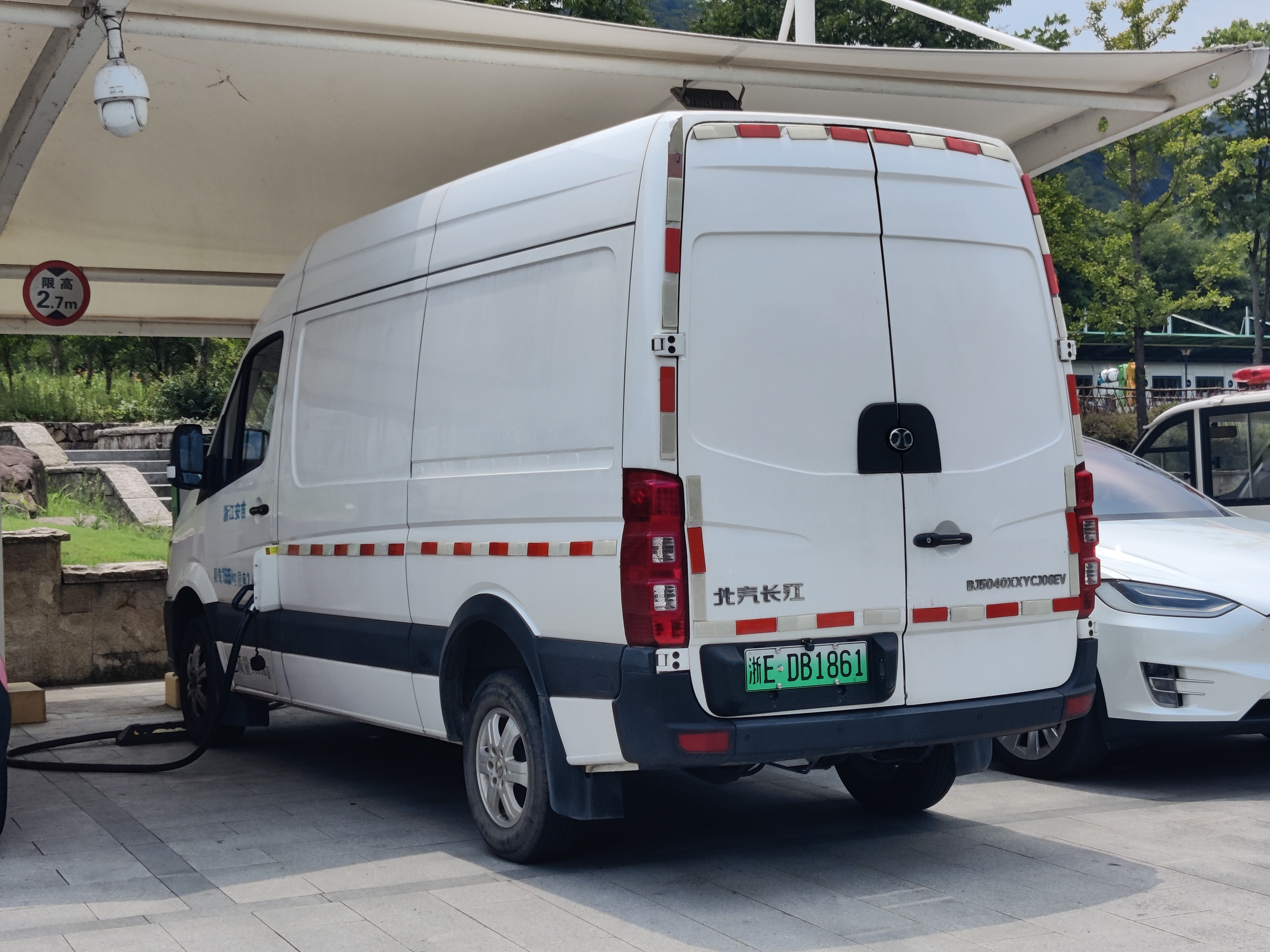
BAIC Changjiang BJ5040XXYCJ08EV rear
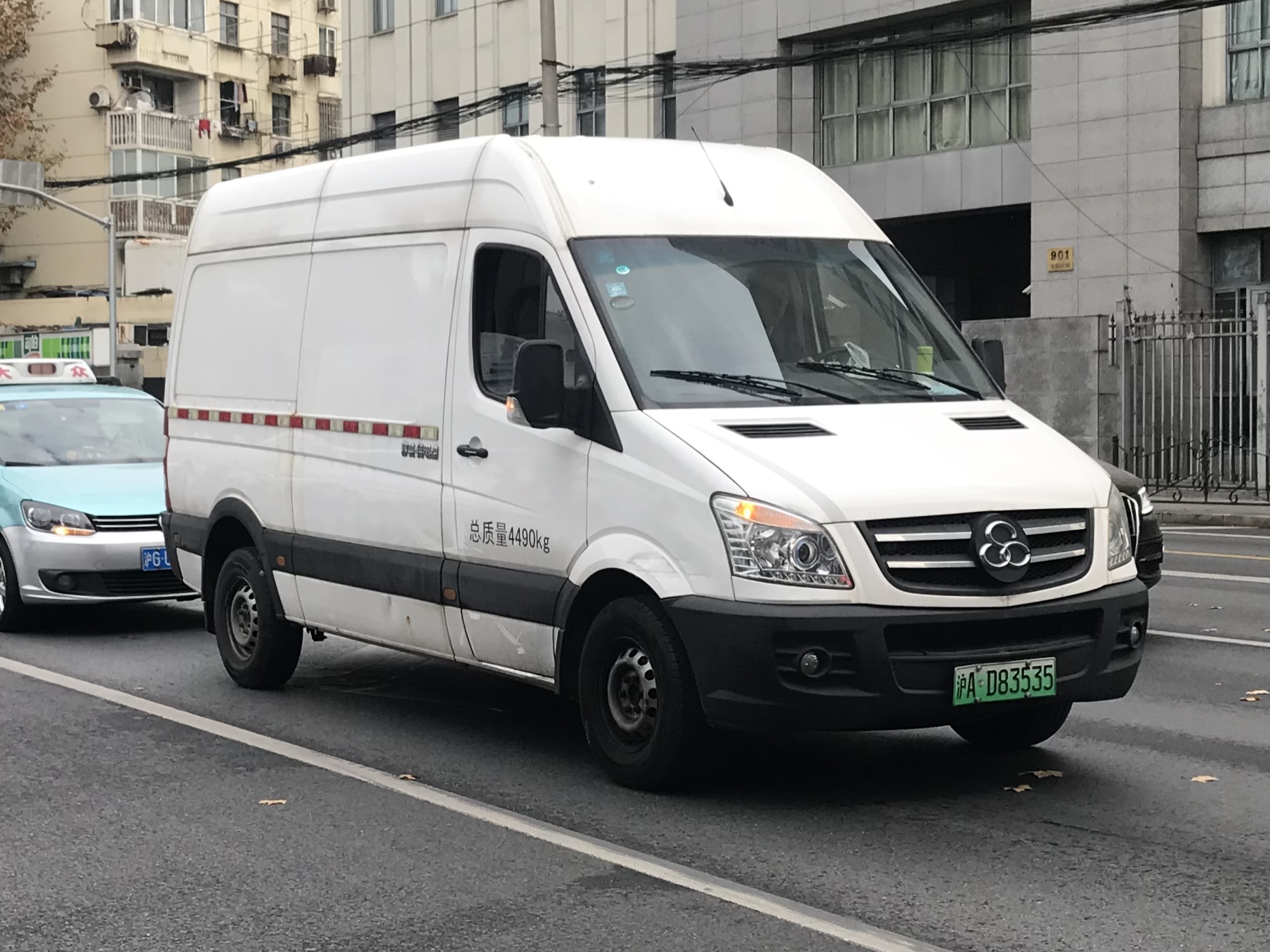
Yantai Shuchi electric van front

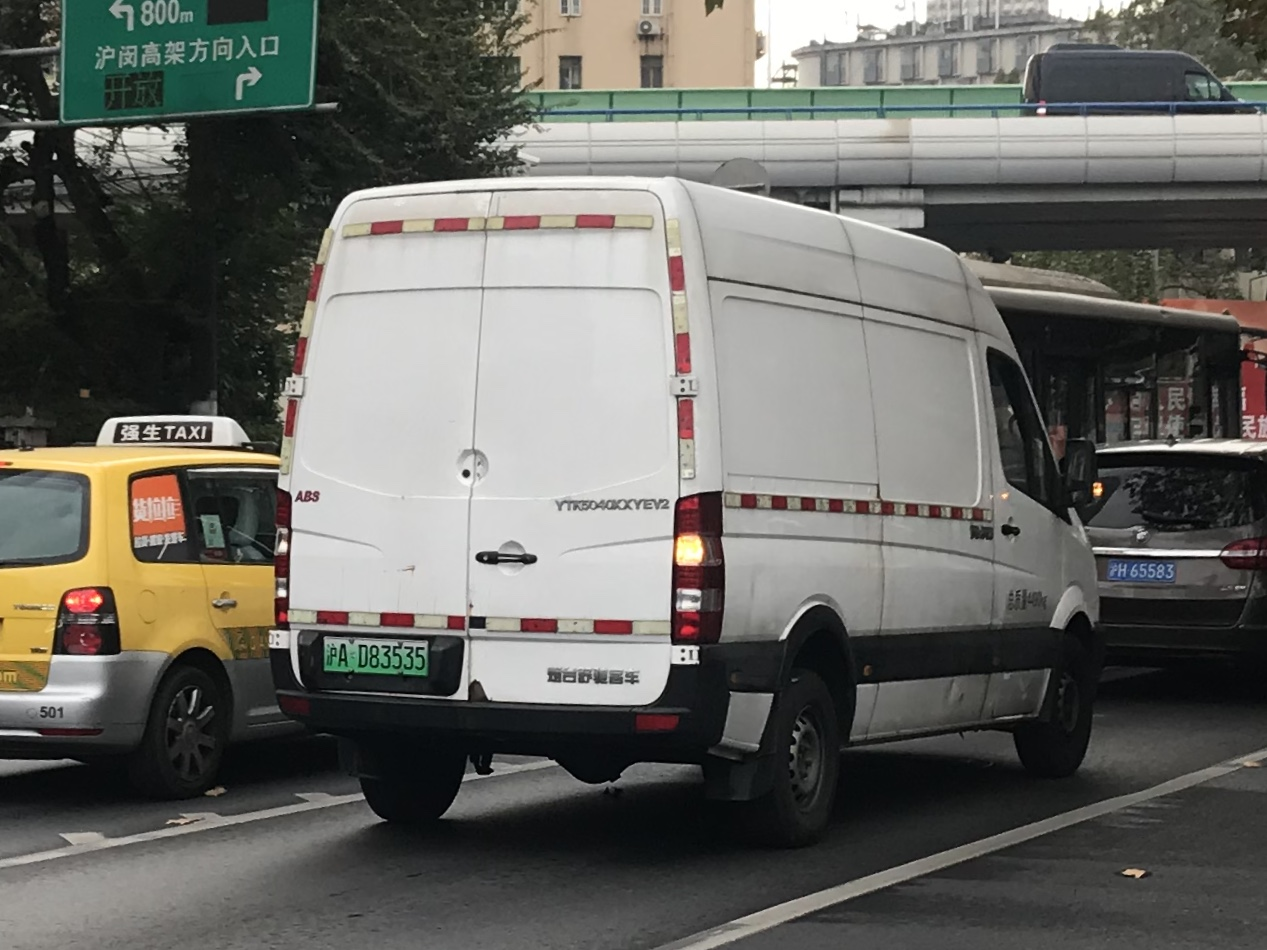
Yantai Shuchi electric van rear
