= Chana Taurustar =

Chinese automobile

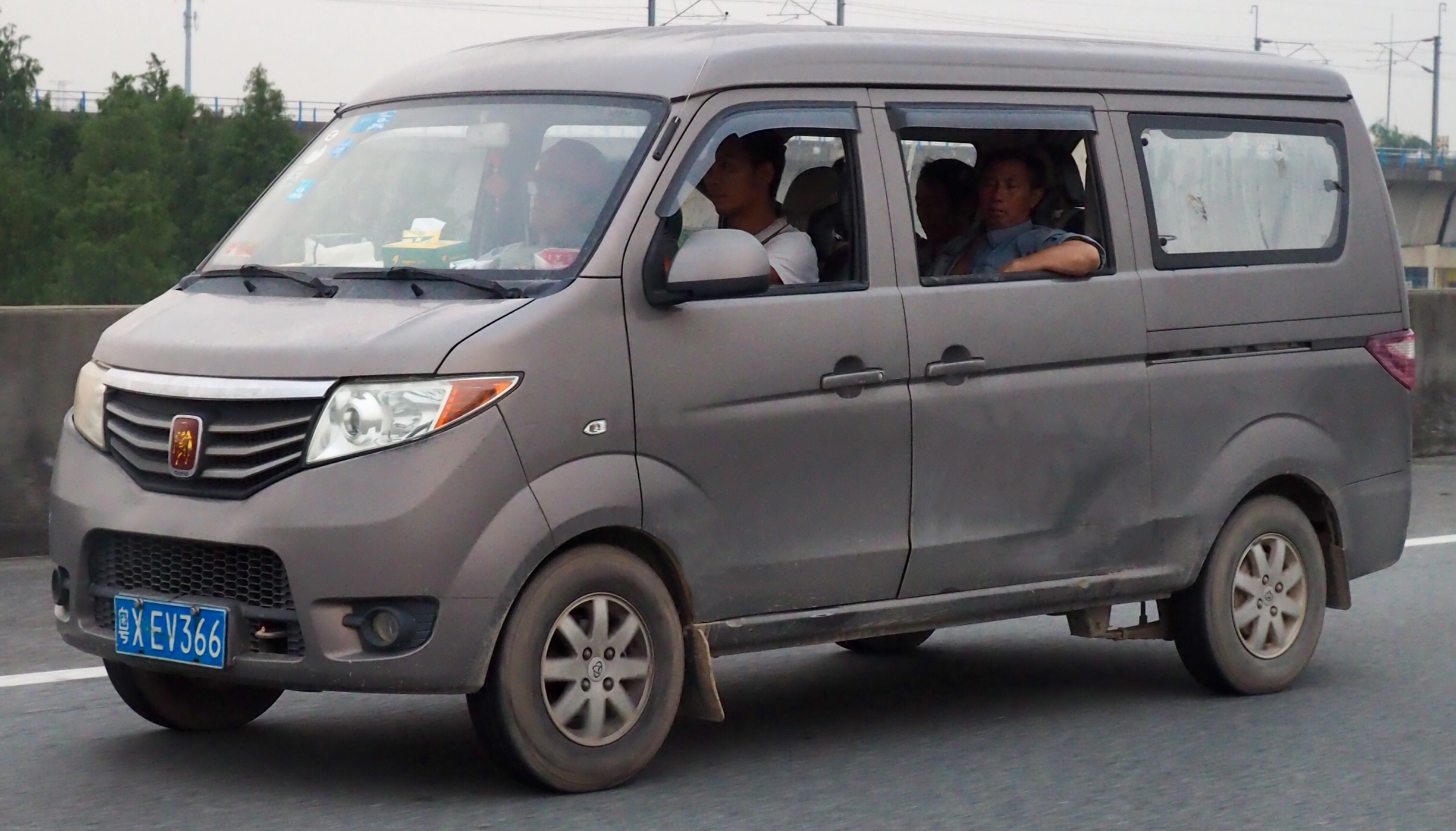
- Chana Taurustar

Overview
- Manufacturer: Changan Automobile
- Also called: Chana Star 7 Nanjing Golden Dragon Skywell D07; Bike Yizhe
- Production: 2010–2015
- Model years: 2010–2015

Body and chassis
- Class: Microvan
- Body style: 5-door wagon
- Layout: Mid-engine, rear-wheel-drive

Powertrain
- Engine: 1.3 L I4 (petrol); 1.4 L I4 (petrol)
- Transmission: 5-speed manual

Dimensions
- Wheelbase: 2,605 mm (102.6 in)
- Length: 4,110 mm (161.8 in)
- Width: 1,690 mm (66.5 in)
- Height: 1,930 mm (76.0 in)

The Chana Taurustar is a microvan produced by Changan Automobile under the Chana sub-brand.

== Overview ==
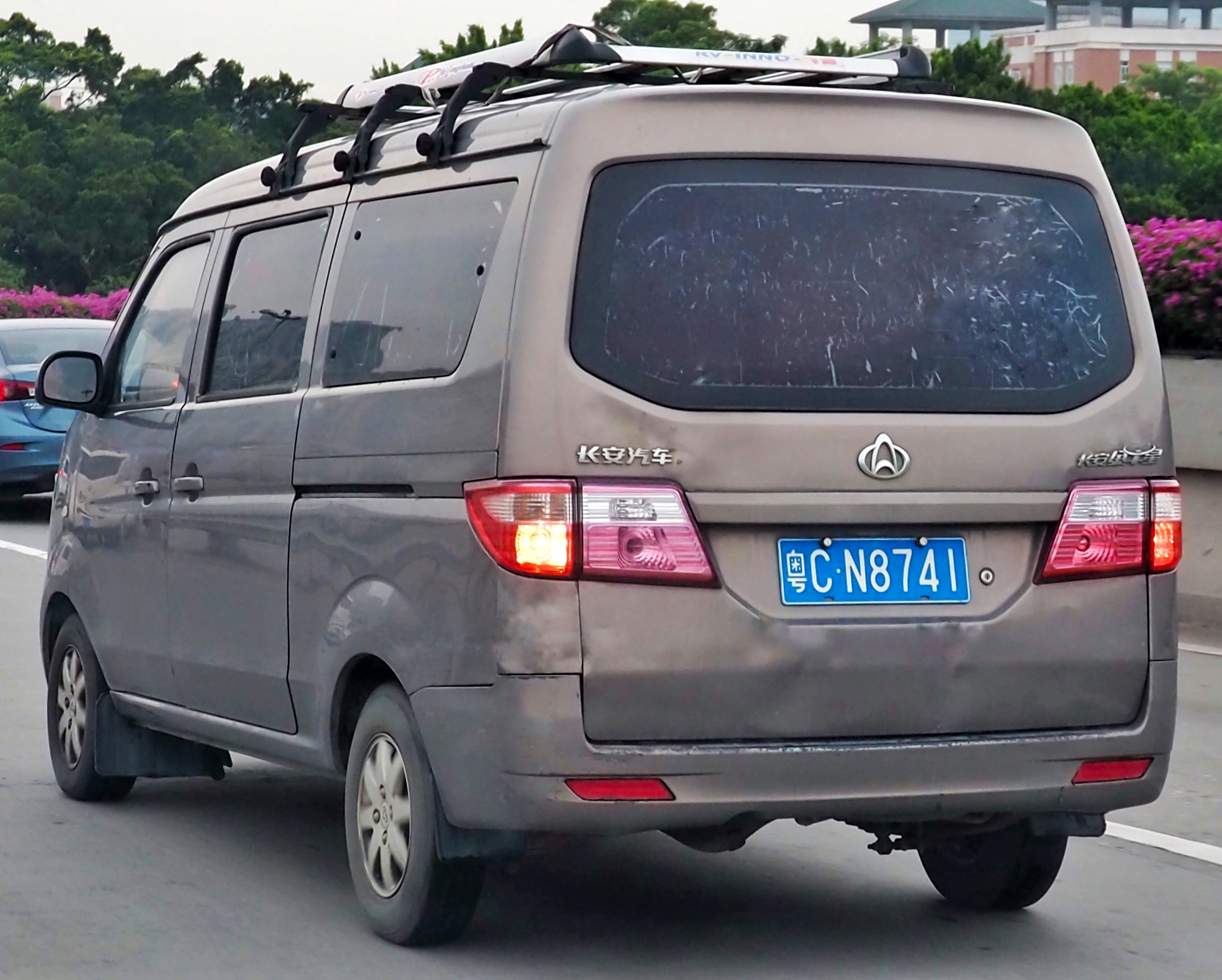
Chana Taurustar rear

Chana Taurustar was released by Changan Automobile on November 16, 2010. The Taurustar is essentially a premium edition of the Chana Star S460 microvan with both sharing exactly the same wheelbase and powered by the same 82 kW 1.3 liter engine unit.

Chana launched a separate logo for the Taurustar alone, and was criticized for having a graphic that resembles the bull from the Lamborghini logo. The logo was intended to highlight the microvan as the flagship in the "Star" light commercial vehicle lineup.

As of May 2014, a minor facelift was conducted to the Chana Taurustar, featuring a restyled front end, a name change to Chana Star 7, and an engine replacement going from 1.3 liter to 1.4 liter. The Chana Taurustar is manufactured by Chana, Changan's commercial division.

== Rebadged electric variants ==
Several rebadged electric panel van variants were produced using the Chana Taurustar body produced for the logistics industry in China.

=== Nanjing Golden Dragon Skywell D07 ===
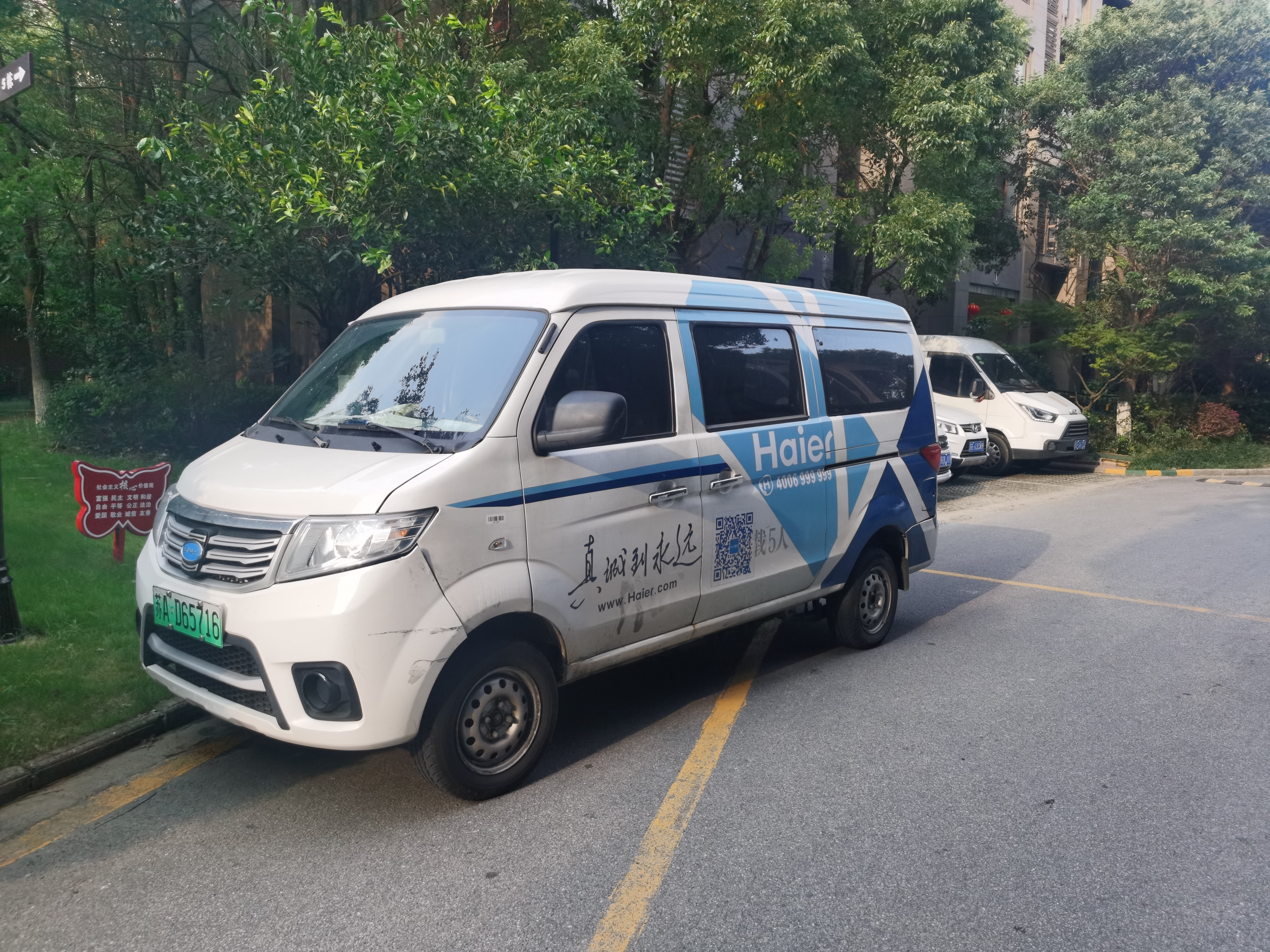
Skywell D07 used as a service vehicle of Haier run

A rebadged electric panel van variant called the Nanjing Golden Dragon Skywell D07 (南京金龙开沃D07) produced by Nanjing Golden Dragon was available for the logistics industry from 2017. A variant is powered by a 60 kW and 220N·m electric motor with a 41.86kWh battery and another variant is powered by a 70 kW electric motor with a 50.3kWh battery. The electric motors are supplied by Nanjing Golden Dragon in house. Across the 20 variants, the electric range ranges from 200 km to 300 km depending on the models.

=== Bike Yizhe ===
Another rebadged electric panel van variant called the Bike Yizhe (比克兴熠) produced by Bike Auto (比克汽车) was available for the logistics industry in one single model from 2020. The Yizhe is powered by a 60 kW and 220N·m electric motor with a 39.8kWh battery with an NEDC electric range of 252 km. The price of the Yizhe is 155,580 yuan.
