= Nanjing Golden Dragon Bus =

Chinese vehicle manufacturer (established 2000)

Nanjing Golden Dragon Bus 南京金龙开沃客车
- NGDB logo in English and Simplified Chinese
- Type: Subsidiary
- Industry: Automotive
- Founded: 2000; 26 years ago
- Headquarters: Nanjing, Jiangsu, China
- Area served: Worldwide
- Key people: Huang Hongsheng (Chairman)
- Products: Vans; Buses; Commercial Vehicles
- Parent: Skywell New Energy Automobile Group
- Website: Official Website (English)
- Footnotes; English site

Nanjing Golden Dragon Bus
- Simplified Chinese: 南京金龙开沃客车
- Traditional Chinese: 南京金龍開沃客車
- Literal meaning: Nanjing Jinlong Kaiwo Bus Manufacturing Co. Ltd.
Transcriptions
Standard Mandarin
- Hanyu Pinyin: Nánjīng jīnlóng kāi wò kèchē

Nanjing Golden Dragon Bus, also known as Nanjing Golden Dragon Skywell, (Note: This name is also used sometimes in English reports from China.) is a Chinese manufacturing company established in 2000 in Nanjing. It produces vans, buses and commercial vehicles for the domestic and export markets. It is a subsidiary company under the Skywell New Energy Automobile Group, and a joint venture with the Xiamen King Long United Automotive Industry.

Its competitors in the hybrid bus industry include Yutong, the Fujian Motors Group (Higer Bus, King Long, Xiamen Golden Dragon Bus), BYD Auto and Zhongtong Bus.

Vehicles manufactured and marketed by NGDB carry the Skywell marque, inspired by the English name of the parent company Skyworth. The name was officially trademarked for NGDB's use as of 2015.

== History ==
NGDB was established in 2000. In 2005, the company underwent restructuring with Xiamen King Long and Nanjing Dongyu Auto Group, each accounting for 60% and 40% of company shares. NGDB underwent another company restructuring in 2011.

In 2012, NGDB passed the new energy vehicle production qualification examination.

On February 27, 2012, Huang Honsheng (Note: He's sometimes known as Stephen Wong or Wong Wong Sang in various news reports.) became chairman of NGBD through investing in the major shareholder, Nanjing Chuangyuan Tiandi Automobile Co. Huang had been released from prison in 2009 after serving three years on charges of theft of corporate funds. He had also been found guilty of conspiracy to embezzle more than 50 million yuan from two Skyworth subsidiaries along with his brother between 2000 and 2004. As of 2015, Huang owns 80% of the company.

On April 20, 2015, NGDB officially launched the Skywell D09 and D11 at the Shanghai International Auto Show. The Skywell D12 was also publicly shown. According to the company, the D11 was manufactured under cooperation with the University of Michigan. In 2016, NGDB released the Skywell E07 and D11 logistic vehicles. In 2017, the Skywell D07, D09 and D10 electric logistic vehicle were released.

On February 25, 2016, Hefei Guoxuan Hi-Tech Power & Energy Co., Ltd. announced that it signed an agreement with NGDB to purchase electric batteries for 1.058 billion RMB. On May 24, 2016, NGDB debuted several hybrid buses including the D11 at the 2016 Beijing International Road Transportation, Urban Bus and Parts Exhibition. The D11 made an appearance at the Canton Trade Fair alongside the D12 on October 20, 2016.

On August 1, 2017, NGDB secured contracts to provide 5,500 D10 logistics vehicles to Chuanghong New Energy, Xi'an Chuangli, and Xi'an Yifu. On August 8, 2017, NGDB debuted a prototype MPV at the 2017 Nanjing Jinlong New Energy Logistics Vehicle Product event. The prototype has a lithium-ion battery with a cruising range of 350 km (220 mi) and a maximum speed of 140 km/h (87 mph).

On January 21, 2018, Huang announced that in June 2017, NGDB acquired the production rights and machinery to manufacture the Chana Taurustar.

On June 18, 2019, the 29th National Energy Conservation Publicity Week and the 5th Nanjing Municipal Public Enterprise Energy Conservation and Carbon Reduction Promotion Month event unveiled the new Z04 and Z10 electric trucks. Jiang Yuejian, the deputy mayor of Nanjing, was the VIP who graced the event to launch the new trucks.

=== Exports ===
On March 4, 2016, NGDB announced the first exports were made to Hong Kong with 45 D11 electric buses to Hong Kong Xianglong Automobile Company.

The D11s manufactured for Hong Kong were made according to local specifications, taking into account the hot and humid weather and the requirement to have them on the road for up to 20 hours, including low-floor access, sliding door, double rear doors and air conditioner systems. Hong Kong's humid climate and its technical standards were also factored into the D11s made for the SAR. The vehicles sold there would be used for luxury taxi operations. According to Qin Xujun, the company's brand director, their exports to Hong Kong "will greatly boost our brand image on the global stage, bringing us closer to the international competition."

In July 2017, NGDB expanded to Thailand in order to venture into the Southeast Asia market.

On November 1, 2018, 49 electric buses were exported to Thailand. At least 34 of the buses are in operational use with Chulalongkorn University.

As of 2019, NGDB has an overseas presence in Thailand, Philippines, Dominican Republic, Vietnam, Malaysia, Canada, Singapore, South Korea, India, Ukraine and Chile.

== Models ==
Model	Calendar year introduced	Current model		Vehicle information
Model	Calendar year introduced	Introduction	Update (facelift)	Vehicle information
Skywell Vehicles
Skywell D07	2017			
Skywell D08	2017			
Skywell D09	2015			
Skywell D10	2017			
Skywell D11	2015			
Skywell D12	2016			
Skywell E07	2016			
Skyworth K10L	2023			
Skywell Z04	June 18, 2019			
Skywell Z10	June 18, 2019			
Nanjing Golden Dragon Vehicles
NJL6129EV	2015			
NJL6859EV	2017			
NJL6706EV	2017			

== Facilities ==
A research and development institute is located in Nanjing. Ex-Chrysler design director Mengyang Zhang served as the head of the institute. In September 2011, the Lishui production line was under construction and went operational by 2015.

In August 2015, the company's business division was established in Wuhan. It was announced that 10,000 hybrid buses and 5,000 spare parts were to be in production. It was reported that NGDB signed an agreement with San Diego State University to establish a joint research laboratory in 2015 to develop electric batteries and other new technology. The company has assisted in funding SDSU's Department of Electrical and Computer Engineering with Professor Chunting C. Mi under the title "Joint Laboratory Development and Training".

On March 2, 2016, NGDB's Wuhan bus production facility was inaugurated, based at the Hannan District Tonghang Industrial Park.

A new production facility was announced in 2017 to be located in Guangzhou to manufacture 10 GWh power battery systems and packs.

== Sales ==
In 2012, NGDB announced that 300 hybrid buses were put into operational use. In 2013, 500 units were delivered to its customers.

In 2014, Nanjing Golden Dragon's sales volume of new energy buses soared to 1,890 units.

NGDB reported that in 2015, 8,700 buses were sold.
