= Skywell D11 =

Chinese van

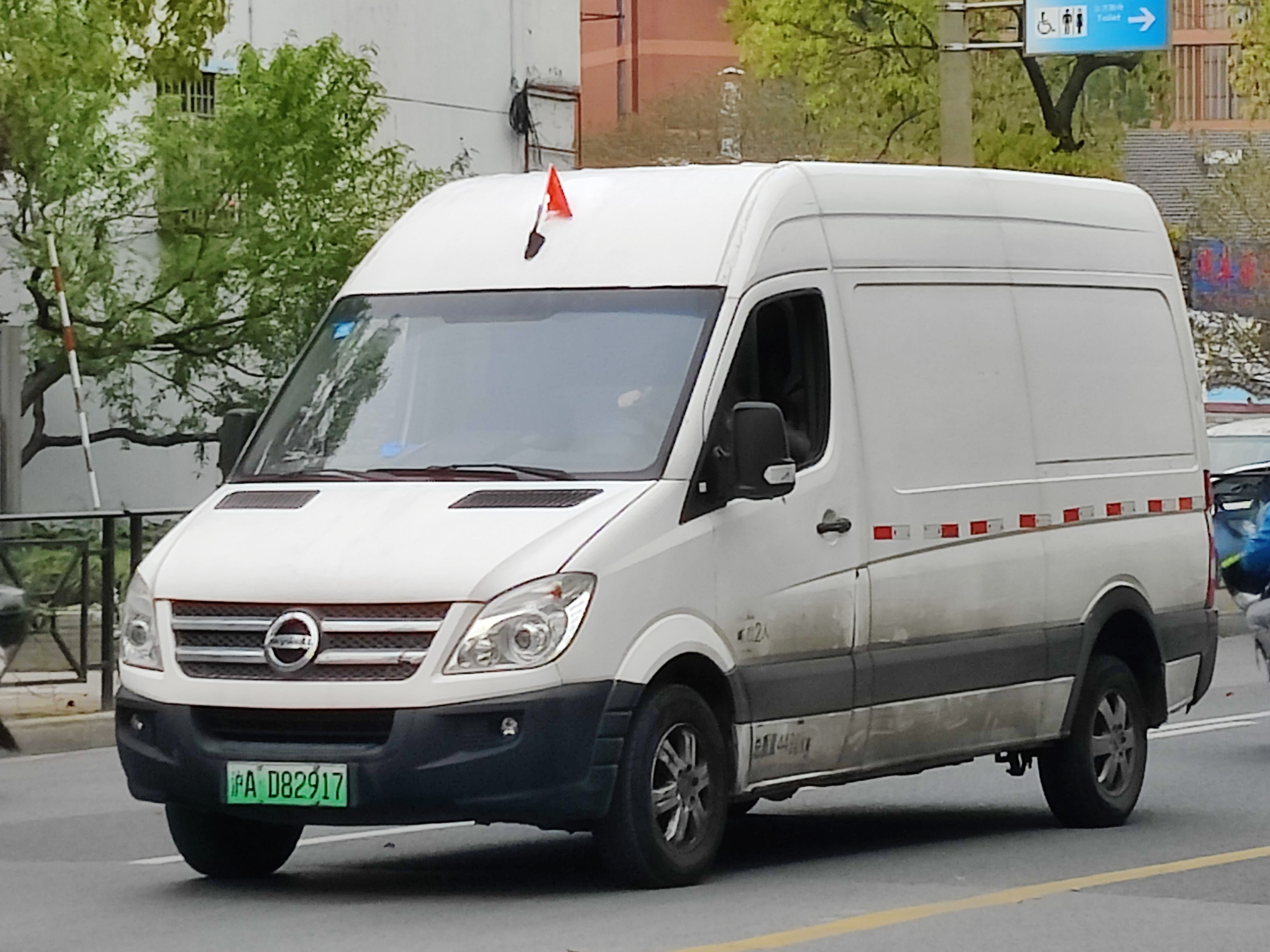

Overview
- Manufacturer: Nanjing Golden Dragon Bus
- Production: 2015–present
- Assembly: China: Nanjing

Body and chassis
- Body style: 4-door van 4-door minibus
- Related: King Long Jockey

Powertrain
- Engine: 2.8L I4 turbo Diesel engine
- Transmission: 6-speed manual

Dimensions
- Wheelbase: 3,665 mm (144.3 in)
- Length: 5,960–6,005 mm (234.6–236.4 in)
- Width: 1,995 mm (78.5 in)
- Height: 2,360 mm (92.9 in)–2,560 mm (100.8 in) (high roof)

The Skywell D11 (开沃D11) is a light commercial vehicle (van) built by Nanjing Golden Dragon Bus from China under the Skywell brand as a van, chassis cab, Recreational vehicle, and minibus.

== Design ==
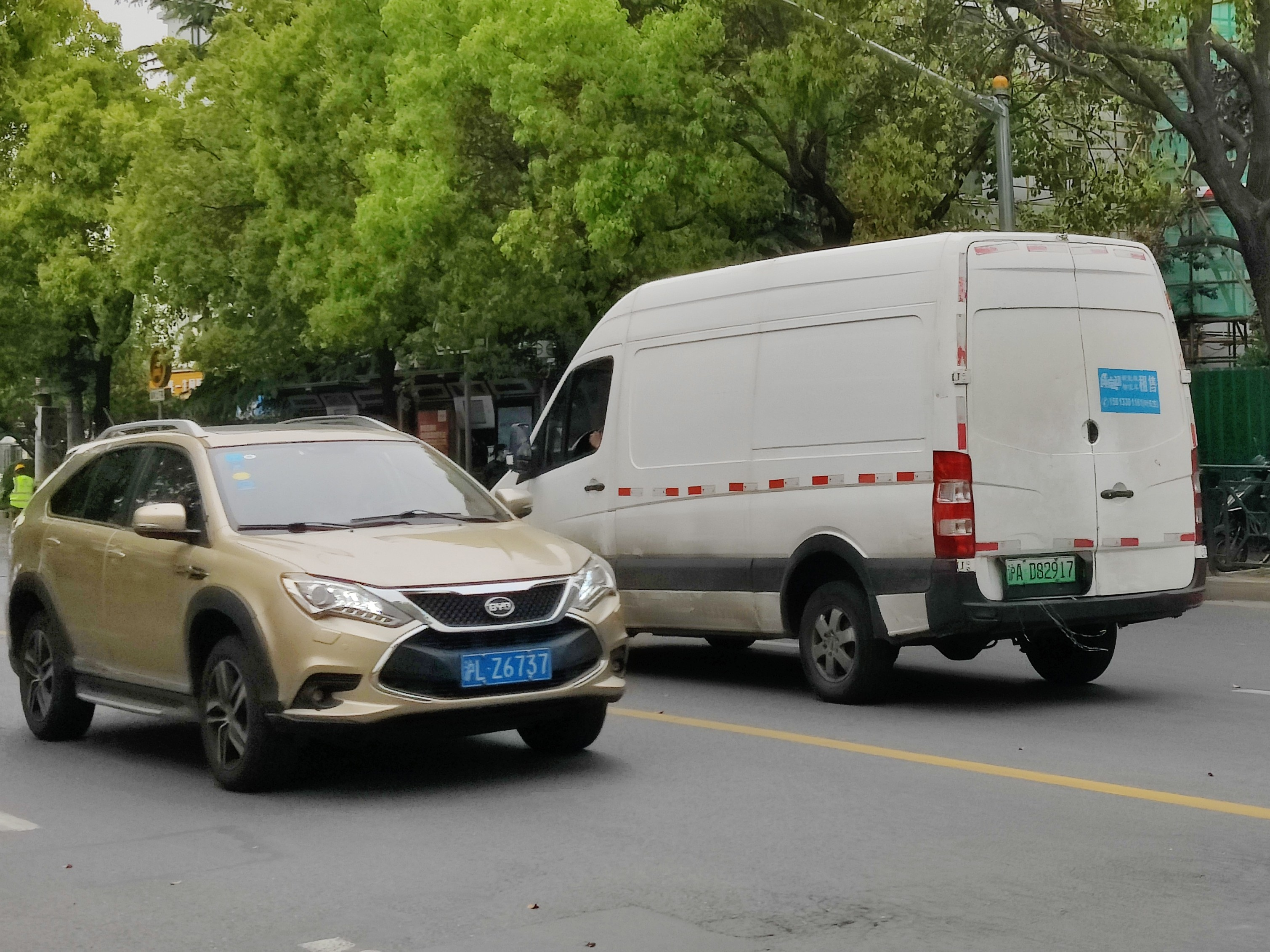
Skywell D11 rear

The Skywell D11 was introduced in China in February 2015 with prices up to 263,000 yuan and the electric variant has prices up to 758,000 yuan. The Skywell D11 is based on the same platform as the King Long Jockey since the Nanjing Golden Dragon is one of the joint ventures of Xiamen King Long United Automotive Industry.

The power of the D11 comes from either a 2.8 litre inline-four turbo diesel engines codenamed JE4D28B and JE493ZLQ4. The maximum output of the JE4D28B is 125 hp at 3200rpm and a torque of 32.6kgm at 1600rpm. The maximum output of the JE493ZLQ4 is 109 hp at 3200rpm and 32.6kgm of torque at 1600-2600rpm. Only a 6-speed manual transmission is available across the range. The top speed is 140 km/h.

The electric version of the D11 has a top speed of 120 km/h and a maximum output of 82 hp, with a 10-18 seater mid-size bus variant available.

== Exports ==
On March 4, 2016, NGDB announced the first exports were made to Hong Kong with 45 D11 electric buses to Hong Kong Xianglong Automobile Company.

The D11s manufactured for Hong Kong were made according to local specifications, taking into account the hot and humid weather and the requirement to have them on the road for up to 20 hours, including low-floor access, right hand drive, sliding door, double rear doors and air conditioner systems. Hong Kong's humid climate and its technical standards were also factored into the D11s made for the SAR. The vehicles sold there would be used for luxury taxi operations. According to Qin Xujun, the company's brand director, their exports to Hong Kong "will greatly boost our brand image on the global stage, bringing us closer to the international competition."

== Controversies ==
The designs of the Skywell D11 vans are controversial as they heavily resemble the Mercedes-Benz Sprinter vans with similar designs, body styles and overall vehicle dimensions. The Skywell D11 vans are among the various Chinese vans from domestic brands that chose to replicate the Mercedes-Benz Sprinter with only minor styling differences. Other brands include King Long, Higer and JAC.
