= Chanje =

Coastal village in Maharashtra

Chanje चाणजे
- Village
- View at the entry of the Chanje village.
- Interactive map of Chanje
- Country: India
- State: Maharashtra
- Region: Konkan
- District: Raigad
- Local Governence: Grampanchayat

Chanje (Marathi: चाणजे) is a coastal village in the state of Maharashtra in India. It is located in the Uran taluka of the Raigad district in the Konkan region of Maharashtra. It is a grampanchayat in the Uran taluka.

View of the premises of the Shree Hanuman Mandir at Chanje village.

The village of Chanje comes under the broader region of the Navi Mumbai development projects in the Mumbai Metropolitan region of Maharashtra.

View of a road junction in the village. The right side road goes to the location of the Shree Hanuman Mandir in the village.

== Demographics ==
According to the population census 2011 of India, the total population of Chanje is 16714. Among the total population, the numbers of males and females are 8723 and 7991 respectively. The total number of households in the village is 3864.
