= Technical standards in Hong Kong =

As a former British colony and territory, technical standards in Hong Kong of today has been largely influenced by that of the United Kingdom, with some exceptions due to local and practical considerations.

== Electrical plugs and adaptors ==
Before the legislation of the Electrical Products Regulation (a few years prior to the handover in 1997), British standard extension cables, plugs and adaptors were seldom found in the market. Electrical appliances were fitted with 2-pin plugs and quasi-UK three pin plugs (which meant they were compatible with BS 1363 or BS 546 sockets, but the plug itself did not comply with the British Standard).

After the enforcement of the regulation, many British standard electrical products are common in Hong Kong market. Some adaptors common in the United Kingdom are not available in Hong Kong. Conversely, local manufacturers develop adaptors for the Hong Kong market and they are not often sold in the UK.

Some local manufacturers print the Union Flag on the plugs and extension cables, but these products are not manufactured or sold in the United Kingdom. This practice has not ceased even though Hong Kong was transferred to the People's Republic of China in 1997.

== Electric sockets (wiring system) ==
Based on the adapted version of IEE Wiring Regulations, the colonial Hong Kong Government published Code of Practice for the Electricity (Wiring) Regulation in the 1990s. This book has been revised several times and the latest version was published in 2009.

In Government buildings, public housing estates and Government-sponsored educational institutions, British electrical products (brands include Tenby, MK electric, Federal Electric, MEM, Crabtree, Legrand etc.) are often used. However, these British electrical products are not very popular in the private sector. Some people consider that British sockets are not very good-looking so they prefer other brands. Australia-based Clipsal (produced by Gold Peak in China) is the most popular brand in private buildings, and some Government buildings built after the handover of Hong Kong to PRC in 1997.

== Telephone sockets ==
Before the handover of Hong Kong, all the domestic telephone sockets installed were BS 6312 British telephone sockets but there was no stipulation on commercial telephone sockets. Both Registered Jack (RJ) and BS 6312 systems were (and are) found in commercial telephone installations.

After the handover, the Hong Kong Government started gradually replacing the BS 6312 sockets with American RJ ones. Service providers install RJ sockets, instead of BS 6312 ones, for clients in new installation, relocation or maintenance projects. Existing BS 6312 sockets before the handover are still in use and there is no compulsory replacement programme.

== Computers ==
=== Keyboard layouts ===
In the Crown colony, United States and Chinese (Traditional) keyboards were utilized by both the colonial Hong Kong Government and the public. United Kingdom layout keyboards are rare in computer malls in Sham Shui Po and Mong Kok. However, Japanese keyboards can occasionally be found.

=== Regional settings in Microsoft products ===
The default regional setting of Microsoft Windows sold in Hong Kong is "English (United States)". Many users in Hong Kong complain that their spell checker software highlights locally correct spelling like "colour" since they did not change the default regional settings in their operating systems and software applications. Most users, however, just leave the default regional setting (English (United States)) unchanged.

Chinese versions of Microsoft Windows are far more popular than the English-language version among Chinese-speaking computer users in Hong Kong.

Moreover, since many people use Chinese versions of Microsoft Windows and Microsoft Office to produce their webpages and emails, many English-language websites and emails In Hong Kong have the encoding "Chinese (Traditional)" (Big5) rather than "Western European" (ISO-8859-1). Unicode webpages are also not very common. Setting the browser to the encoding of "Western European" to view these Big5 Hong Kong webpages may cause some characters (for example, ',", £, € etc.) to be displayed incorrectly.

== TV broadcast ==
=== Analogue terrestrial ===
Hong Kong used the UK PAL-I broadcast system. Stereo audio is under NICAM system, which is the same as British standard.

=== Digital terrestrial ===
Hong Kong has adopted the system developed by PR China in 2006.

== DVD and VCD ==
In the UK DVDs are region 2, of PAL standard. However, even though Hong Kong is under control of the People's Republic of China, DVDs found here are not Region 6 (for users in the mainland China). Officially, the DVDs in Hong Kong are region 3 in NTSC colour-coding. DVDs of region 1 (US, NTSC format) or region 2 (Europe, PAL format) can be also found in local shops like HMV, which is not an issue for the local market as DVD players commonly sold in the shops are multi-region.

Just as other Asian countries, VCDs are common for rental and sale in Hong Kong but these discs are not popular in the UK.

== Telecommunications ==
Hong Kong uses the GSM 900 & 1800 standards and some operators offer 3G services (3G 2100).

== Analog video ==
Similar with the US, Japan and Australia, S-Video is commonly used in colonial and post-handover Hong Kong equipment. These ports are commonly found there on consumer TVs, DVD players, VCRs and game consoles sold there. Although the UK uses the higher-quality RGB signal transmission scheme provided by European Standard SCART, SCART ports are seldom found in Hong Kong equipment.

For RF signals, the Belling-Lee connector or IEC 169-2 connector are very commonly used in equipment sold in Hong Kong. However, same as Europe, the 75-ohm F connector is used by Cable TV Hong Kong instead of Belling-Lee ones.

== See also ==
- Colonial Hong Kong
- History of Hong Kong
