= King Long Jinwei =

Chinese commercial van

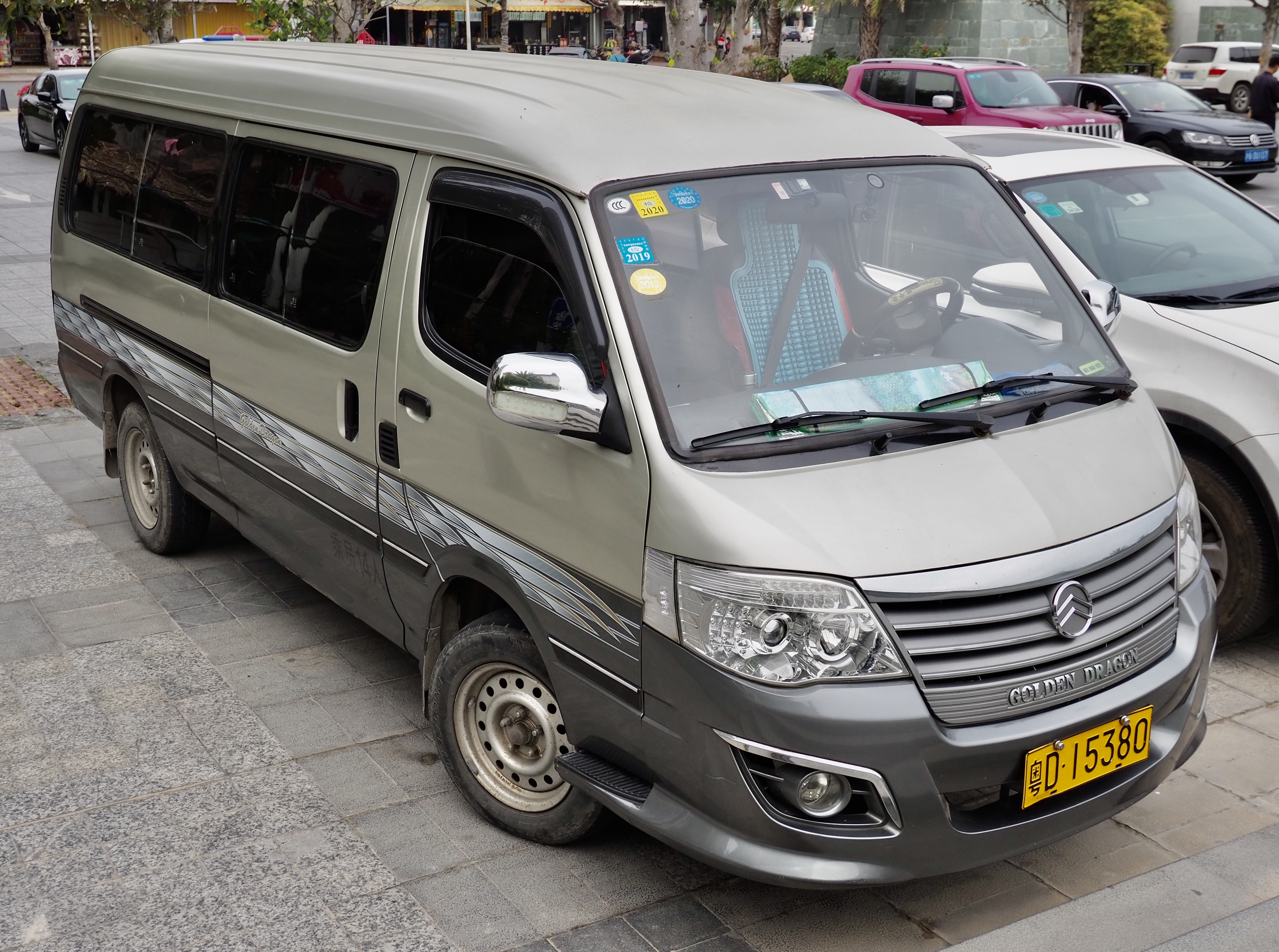

Overview
- Also called: Xiamen Golden Dragon Haise; Golden Dragon V4; Skywell D10; King Long Univan; Pyeonghwa Samcheonri (North Korea)
- Production: 1995 – Present
- Assembly: China: Xiamen

Body and chassis
- Body style: 4-door van/minibus
- Layout: Front-engine, rear-wheel-drive / four-wheel drive
- Related: Toyota HiAce H100

Powertrain
- Engine: 2.0 L V20 I4; 1.8 L LJ4A18Q6 I4 I4
- Transmission: 5-speed manual

Dimensions
- Wheelbase: 2,890 mm (113.8 in)
- Length: 5,340 mm (210.2 in)
- Width: 1,700 mm (66.9 in)
- Height: 1,960 mm (77.2 in)

The King Long Jinwei (Chinese: 厦门金龙-金威) is a series of light commercial van produced by the Chinese automobile manufacturer King Long based on licensed tooling of the fourth generation Toyota HiAce. A rebadged variant called the Golden Dragon V4 was sold alongside by Golden Dragon, a subsidiary of King Long. The King Long Jinwei has since been available in a wide range of body configurations, including a minivan/MPV, minibus, panel van, crew van, and an ambulance.

== History ==
Originally launched in 1995, the early models of the King Long Jinwei and Golden Dragon V4 was called the Haise with the code name XML6480, and they were built using the toolings of the Toyota HiAce H100 vans.

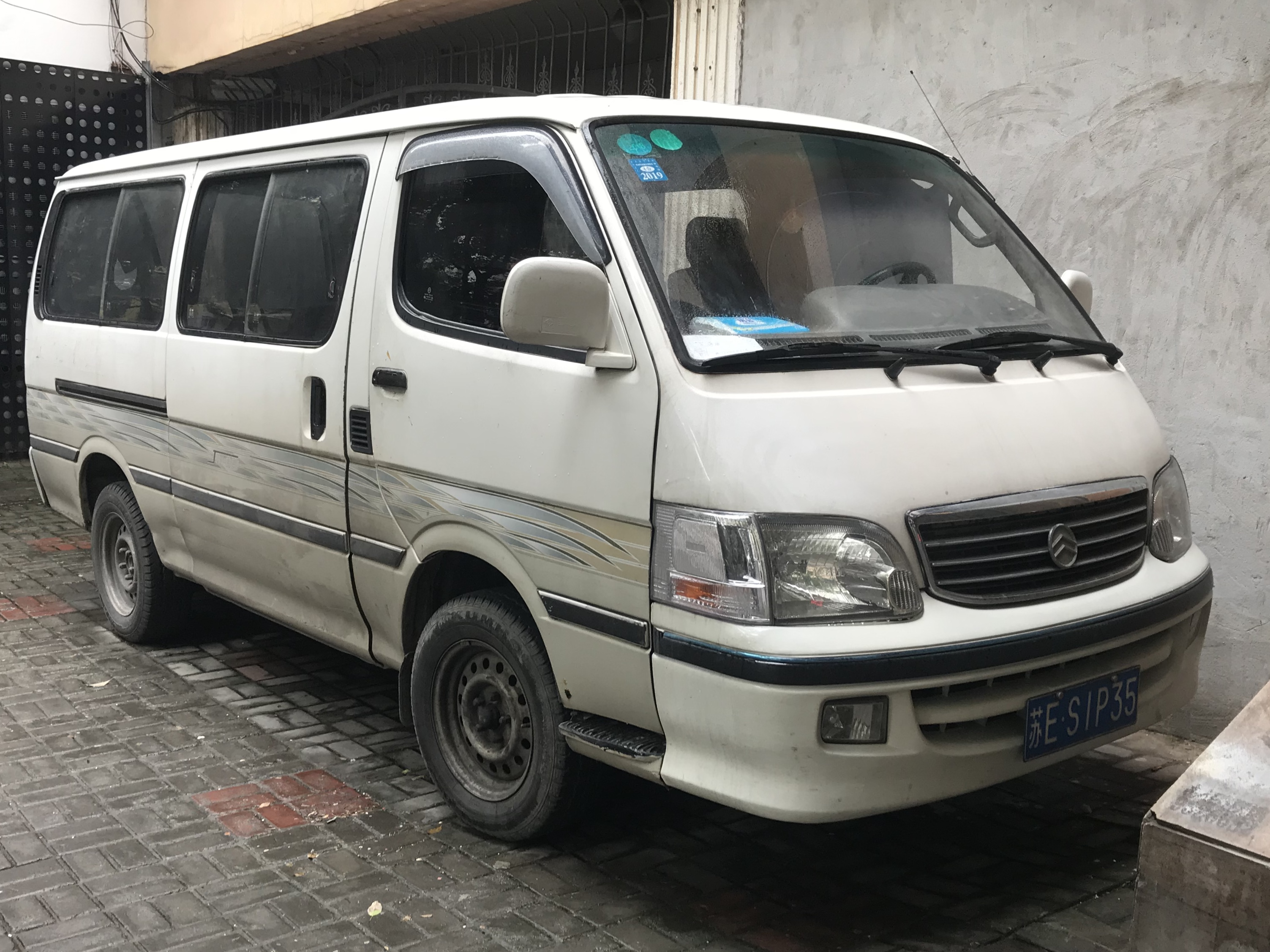
Early Golden Dragon V4 (Haise), front quarter view

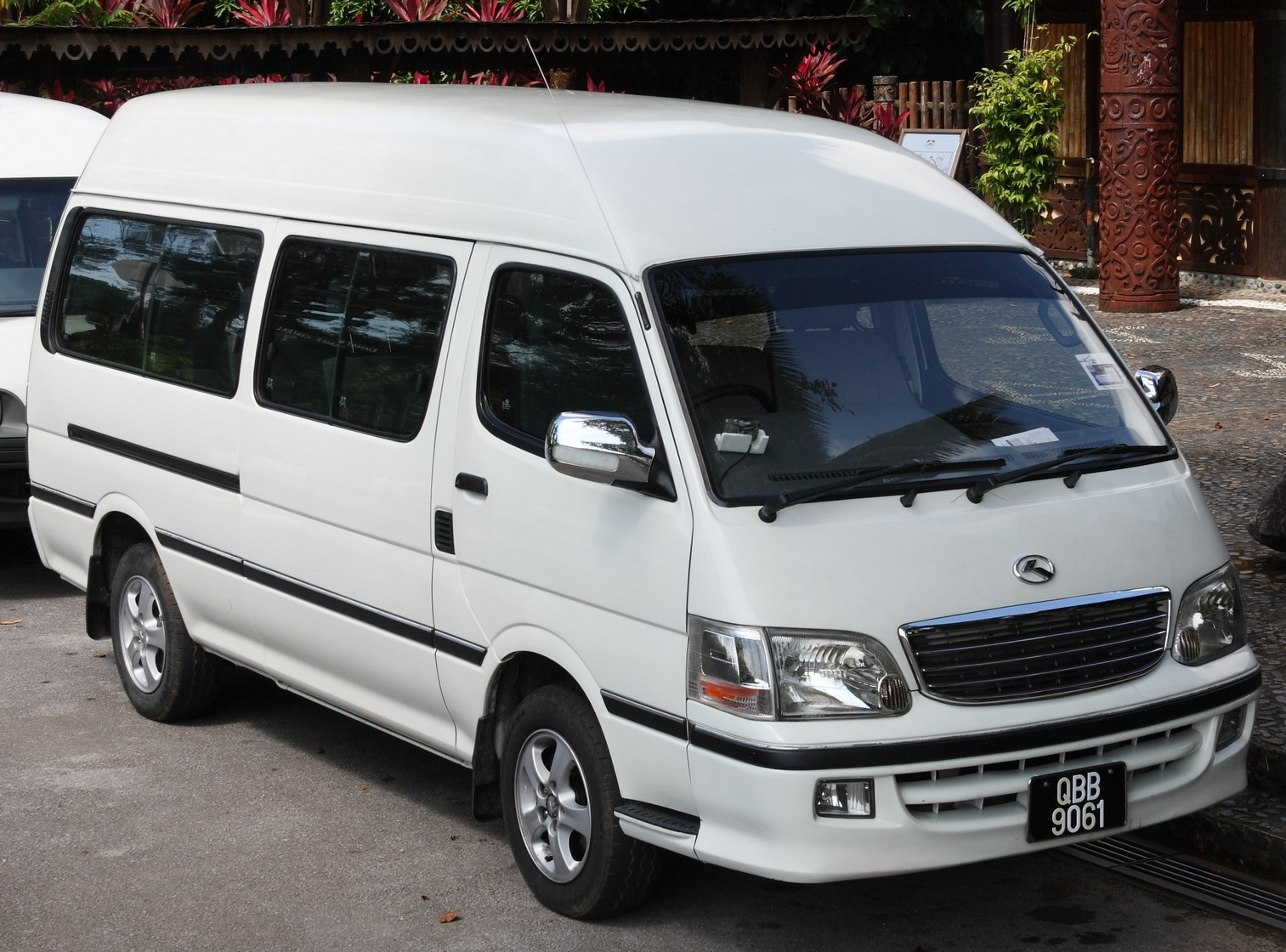
Early King Long Haise in Malaysia

=== Golden Dragon facelift ===
A facelift unique to the Golden Dragon brand was revealed after that featured a completely restyled front fascia, black window trims, and tail lamp extensions on to the tailgate for more upmarket trim levels.

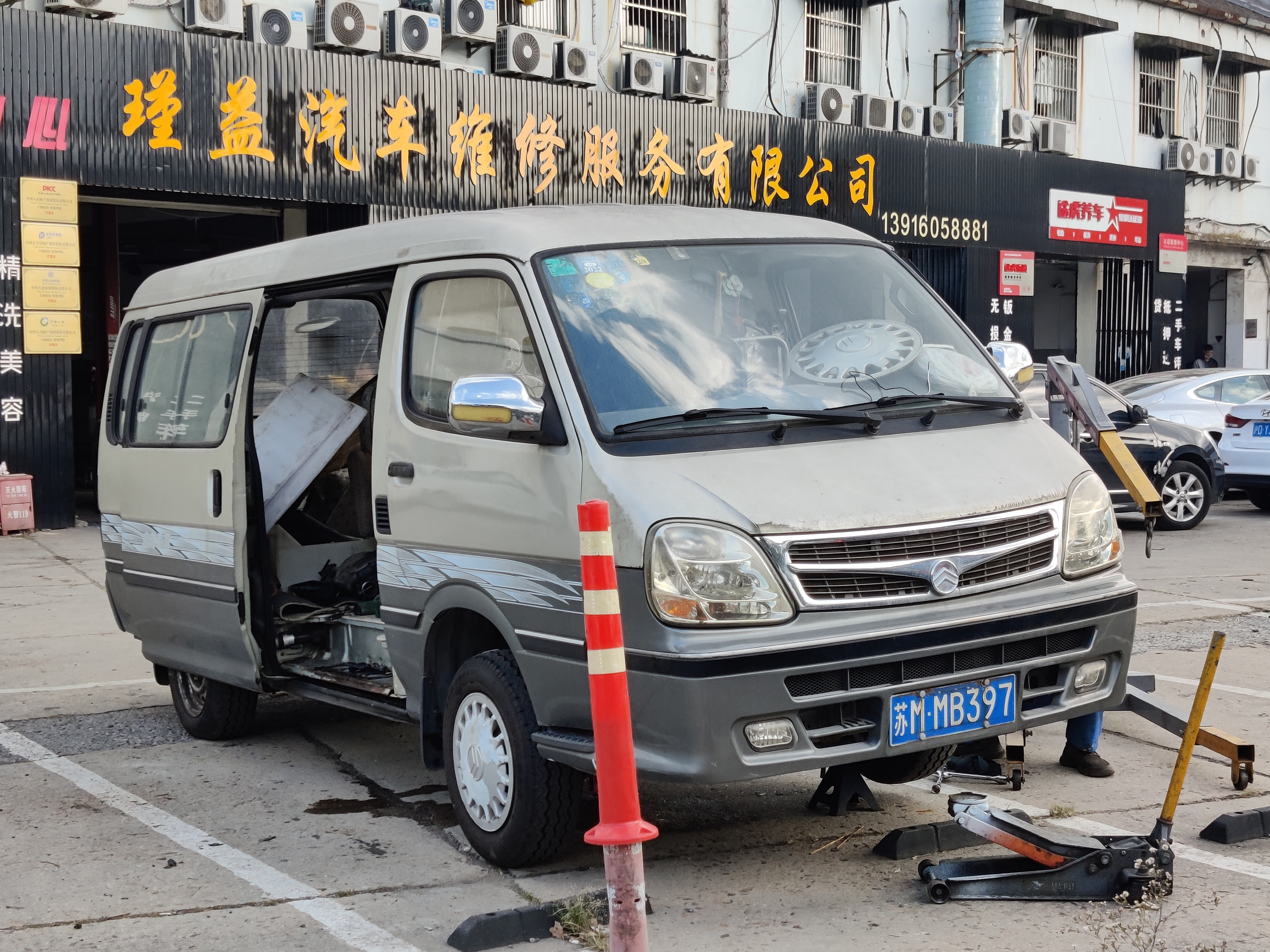
Golden Dragon Haise XML6532 first facelift (front)

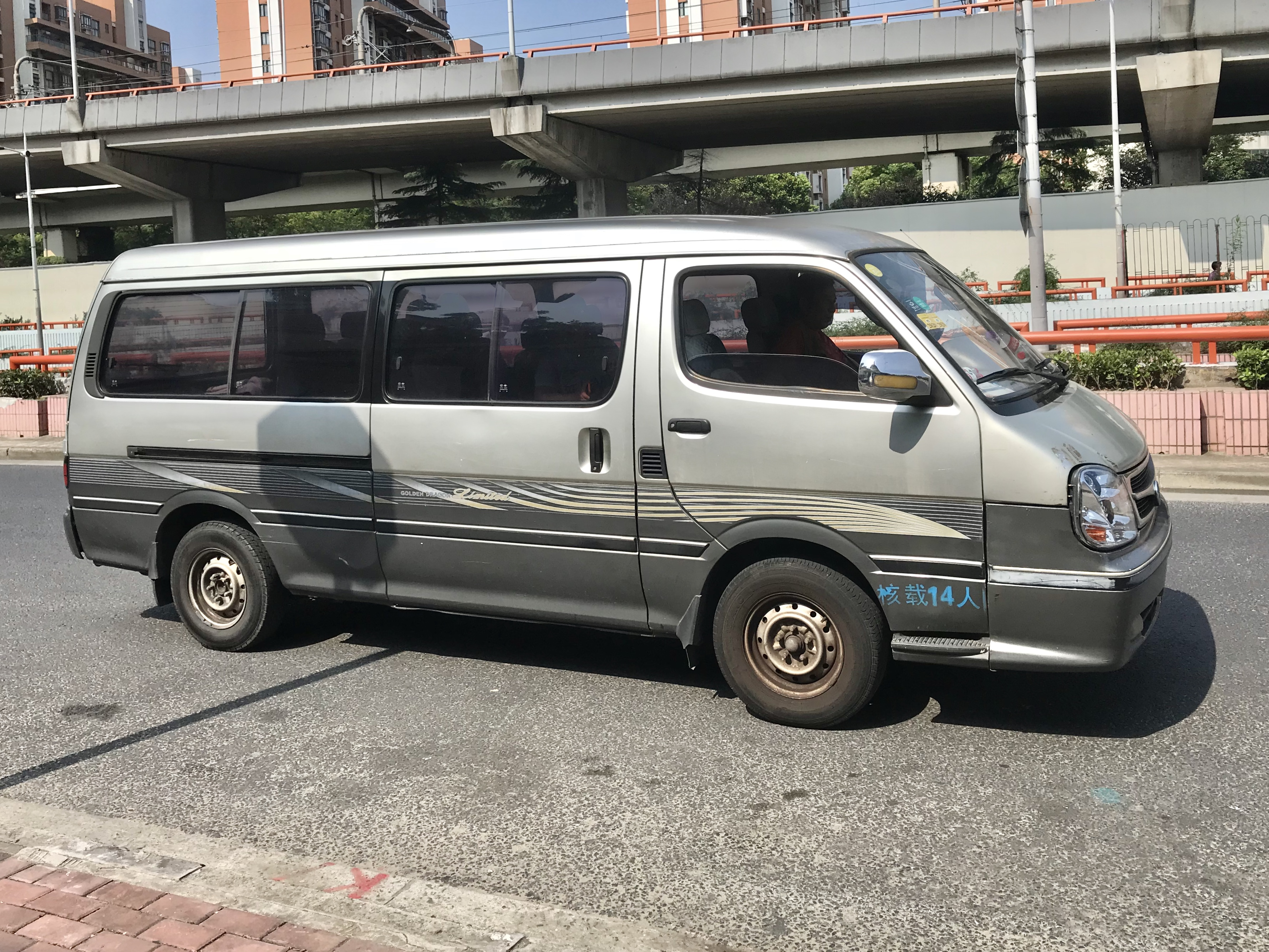
Golden Dragon Haise XML6532 first facelift (side)

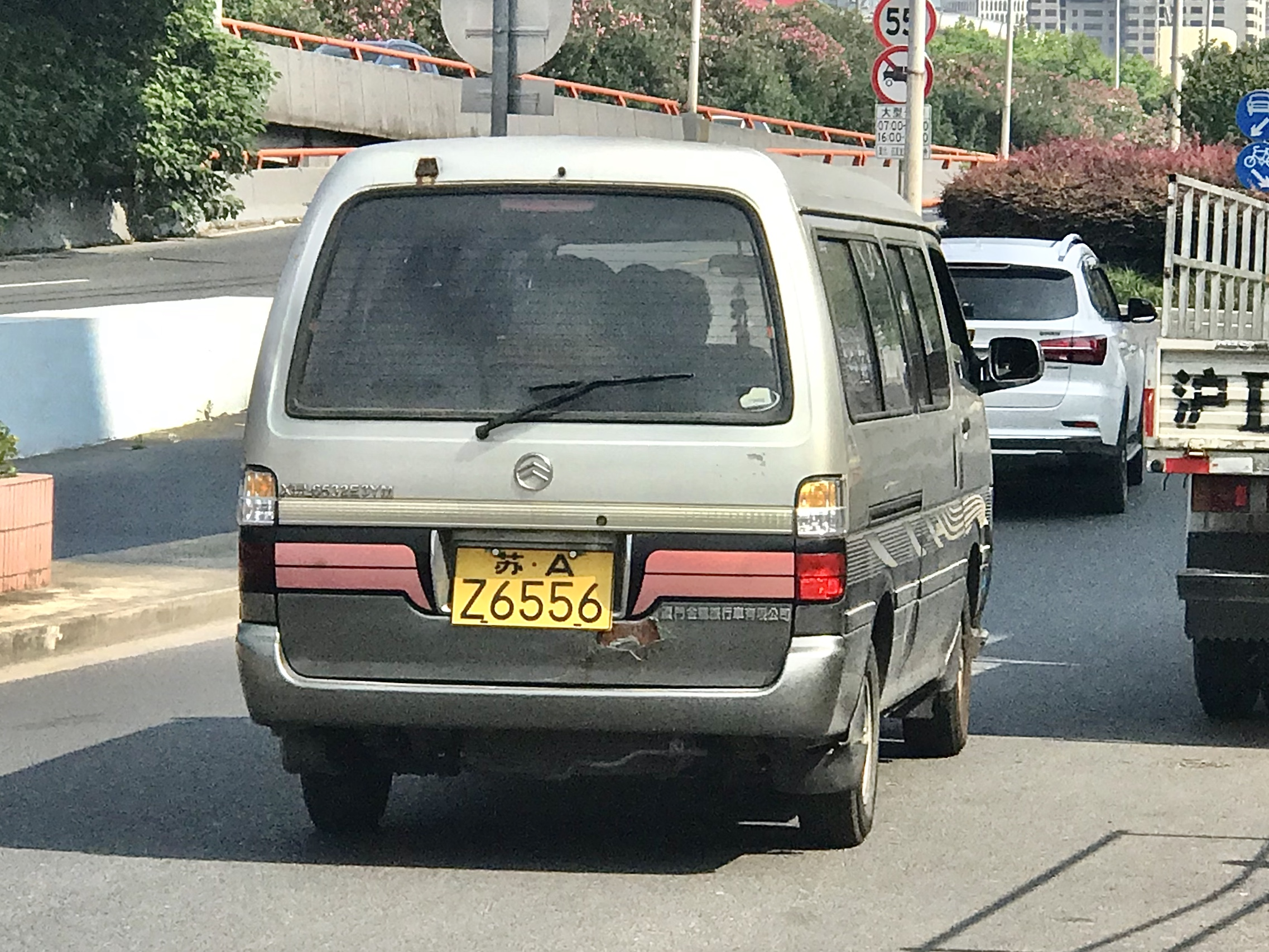
Golden Dragon Haise XML6532 first facelift (rear)

On 20 June 2010, a second facelift for the Golden Dragon and King long Jinwei was launched on to market. The updated model features a revised and upgraded interior and an exterior appearance similar to the Foton View models with crystal LED headlights. The updated Jinwei offers both gasoline and diesel powered engines, with five engine options available. For the gasoline engines, options include the 491, V20, and 4RB2 gasoline engines based on Toyota systems, electronic throttle control (ETC) technology, AV1 combustion diagnosis technology and ECU computer smart control for better fuel capability and power output. For diesel engines, options include the GW2.8TC-2 and YC4FB90-30 diesel engines.

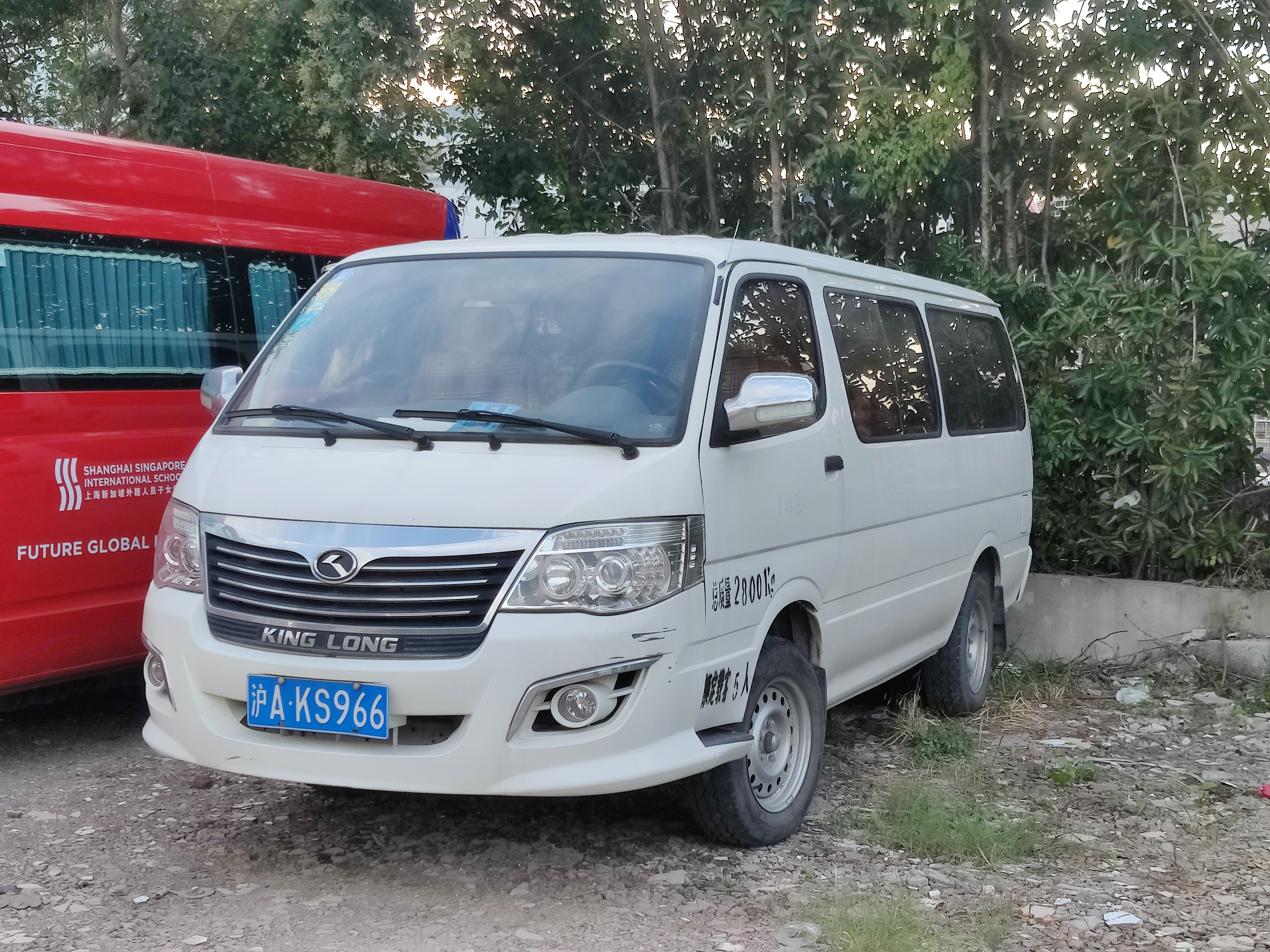
King Long Jinwei facelift (front)

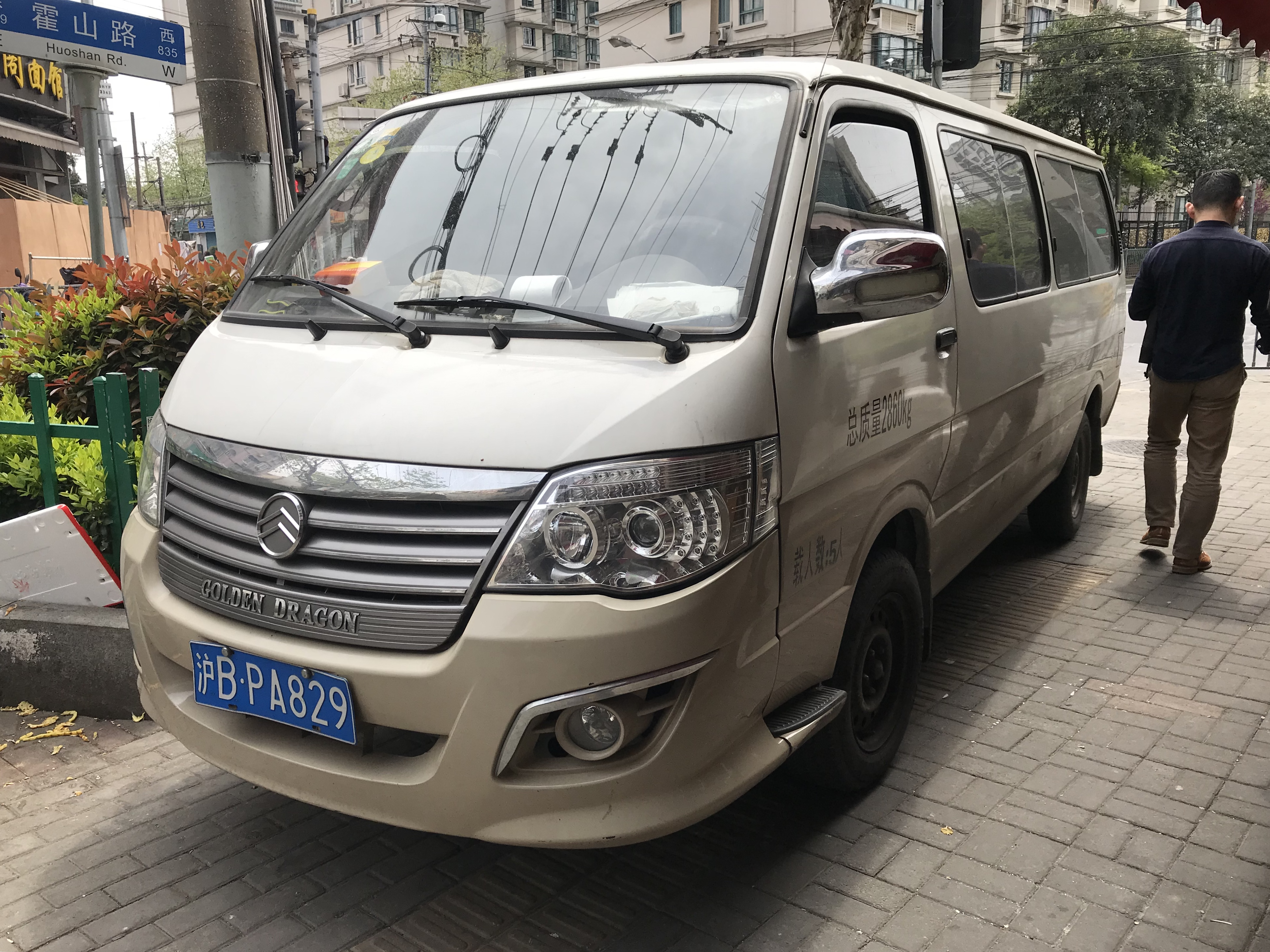
Golden Dragon V4 Second facelift (front)

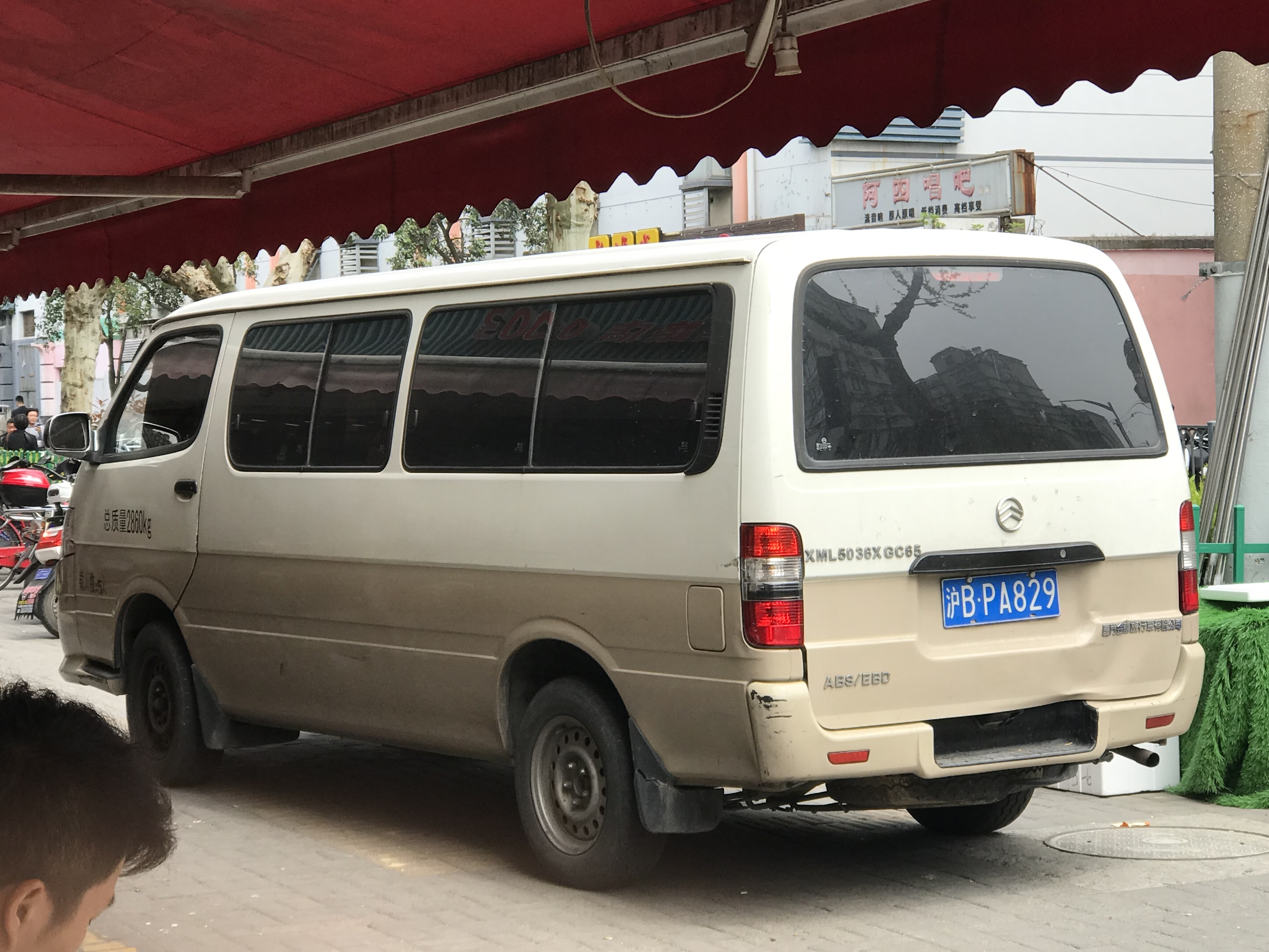
Golden Dragon V4 Second facelift (rear)

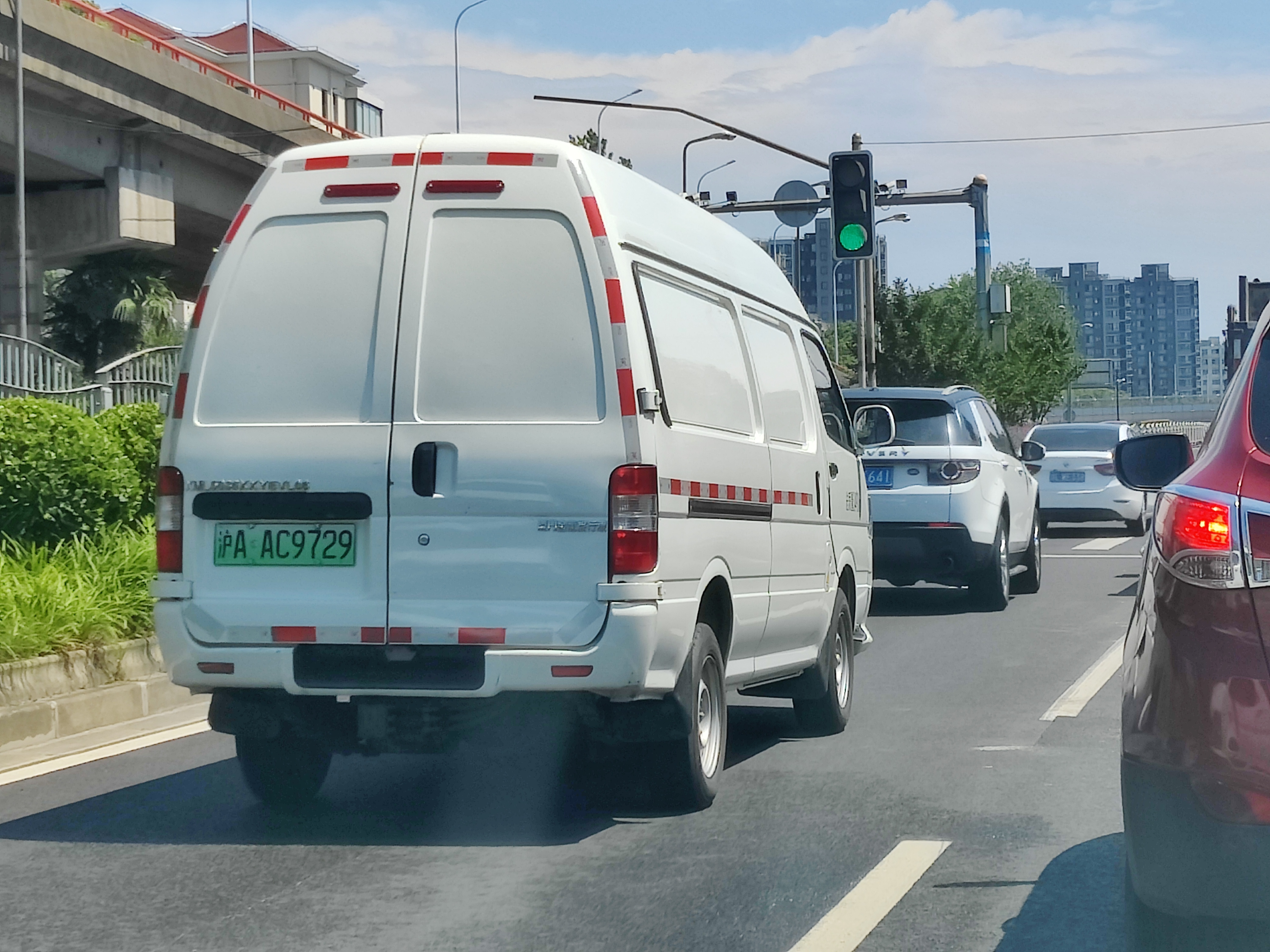
Golden Dragon Haise electric van with side hinged tailgates

A third facelift was launched in June 2014 with CNG versions also available. The 2014 facelift features a slightly redesigned front unique to the King Long brand. A more upmarket model named the King Long Xinjinwei or New Jinwei was launched in December 2016, which is essentially a slightly cheaper King Long Kaige.

=== Belarusian clone ===
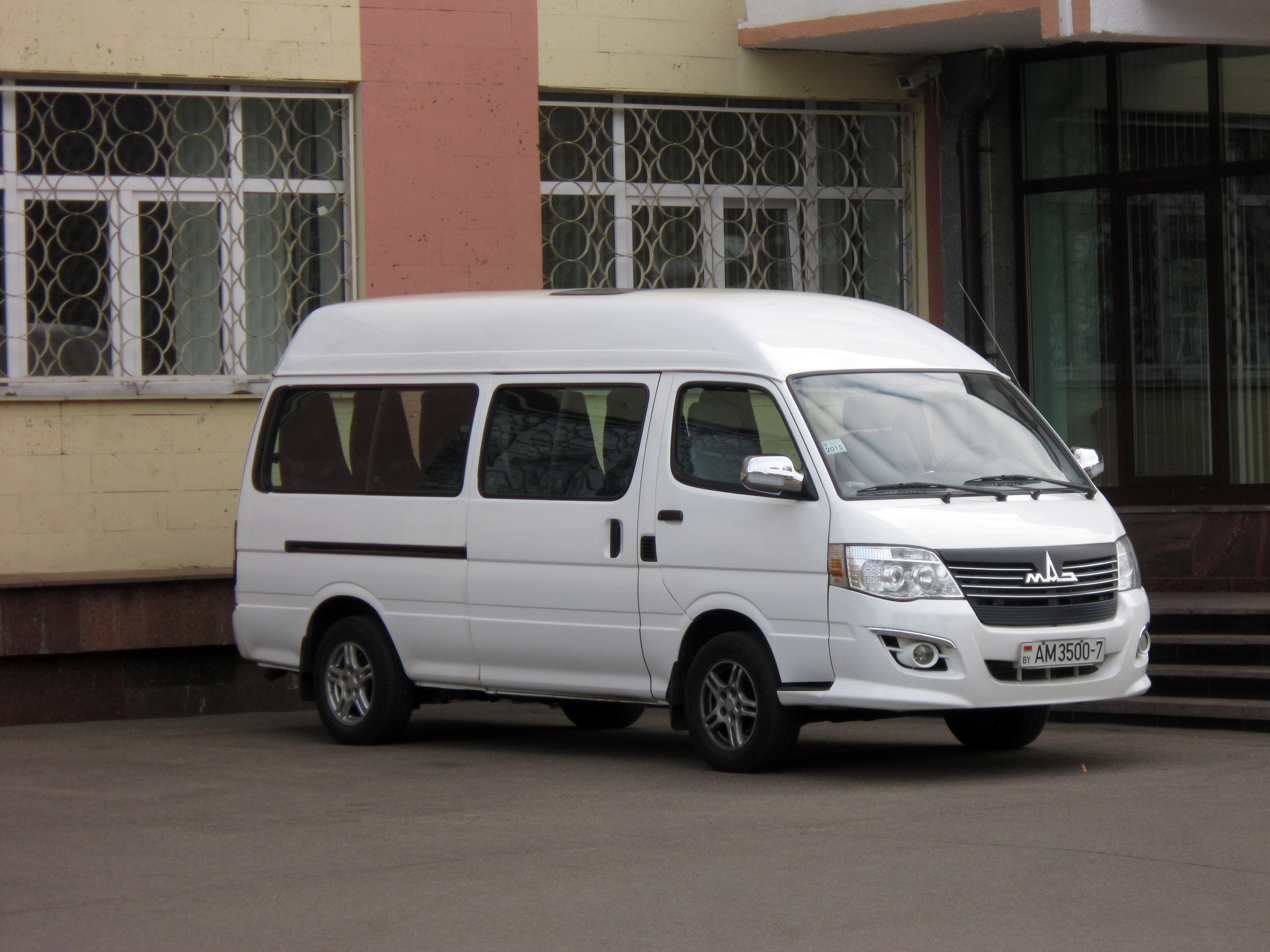
MAZ-182 at the MAZ factory

In Belarus, the MAZ-182 was made based on the King Long Haise before it was phased out of production due to lack of interest with plans to eventually localize production. The first models (MAZ-181010 and MAZ-182010) were made in December 2010 before it was dropped in 2012, with surviving models found either being used for MAZ personnel or in the streets, some of them as ambulances.

The models were publicly displayed in 2011.

The MAZ-181010 was made with a high roof and long wheelbase, with the MAZ-182010 with a low roof and short wheelbase. The "Nika" was a single ambulance model made.
