= Golden Dragon (company) =

Chinese bus manufacturer

Xiamen Golden Dragon Bus Co. Ltd 厦门金龙旅行车有限公司
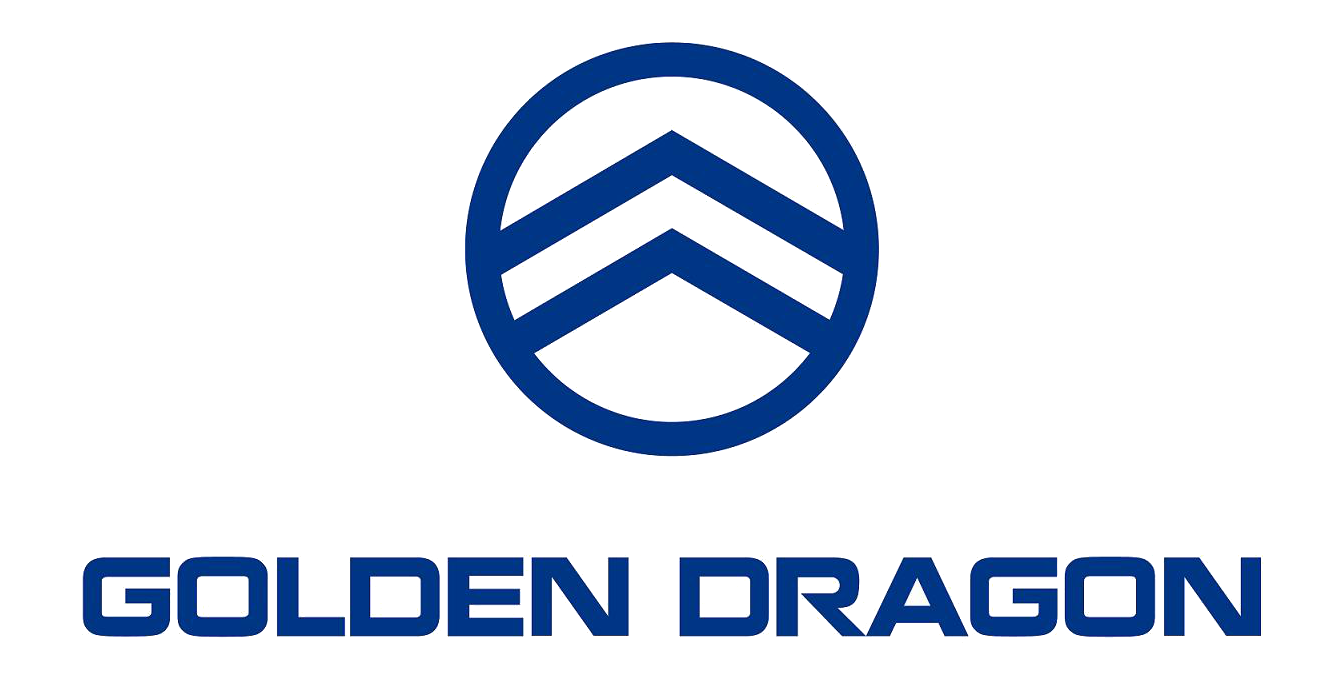
- Type: Joint venture
- Industry: Automotive manufacturing
- Founded: 1992; 34 years ago
- Headquarters: Xiamen, Fujian, China
- Area served: Worldwide
- Products: Buses, coaches, vans
- Parent: King Long
- Website: Golden Dragon Global; Golden Dragon China

Golden Dragon
- Simplified Chinese: 厦门金龙旅行车有限公司
- Traditional Chinese: 廈門金龍旅行車有限公司
Transcriptions
Standard Mandarin
- Hanyu Pinyin: Xiàmén Jīnlóng Lǚxíngchē Yǒuxiàn Gōngsī
Southern Min
- Hokkien POJ: Ē-mn̂g Kim-liông Lí-he̍ng-chhia iú-hān Kong-si

Alternative Chinese name
- Simplified Chinese: 金旅客车
- Traditional Chinese: 金旅客車
Transcriptions
Standard Mandarin
- Hanyu Pinyin: Jīnlǚ Kèchē
Southern Min
- Hokkien POJ: Kim-lí Kheh-chhia

Xiamen Golden Dragon Bus Co. Ltd (Chinese: 厦门金龙旅行车有限公司, or commonly known as 金旅客车) is a Chinese joint venture company established in 1992 in developing, manufacturing, and selling 5m to 18m long luxury buses and light vans with the trade mark of "Golden Dragon". It has a reputation as one of the top 10 bus manufacturers and bus brands in China. Its buses have been exported to nearly 40 countries and regions in Asia, the Middle East, Africa, South America, and the company is tapping into the European market. It is part of King Long, one of the largest bus manufacturers in China.

== Products ==
=== City buses ===
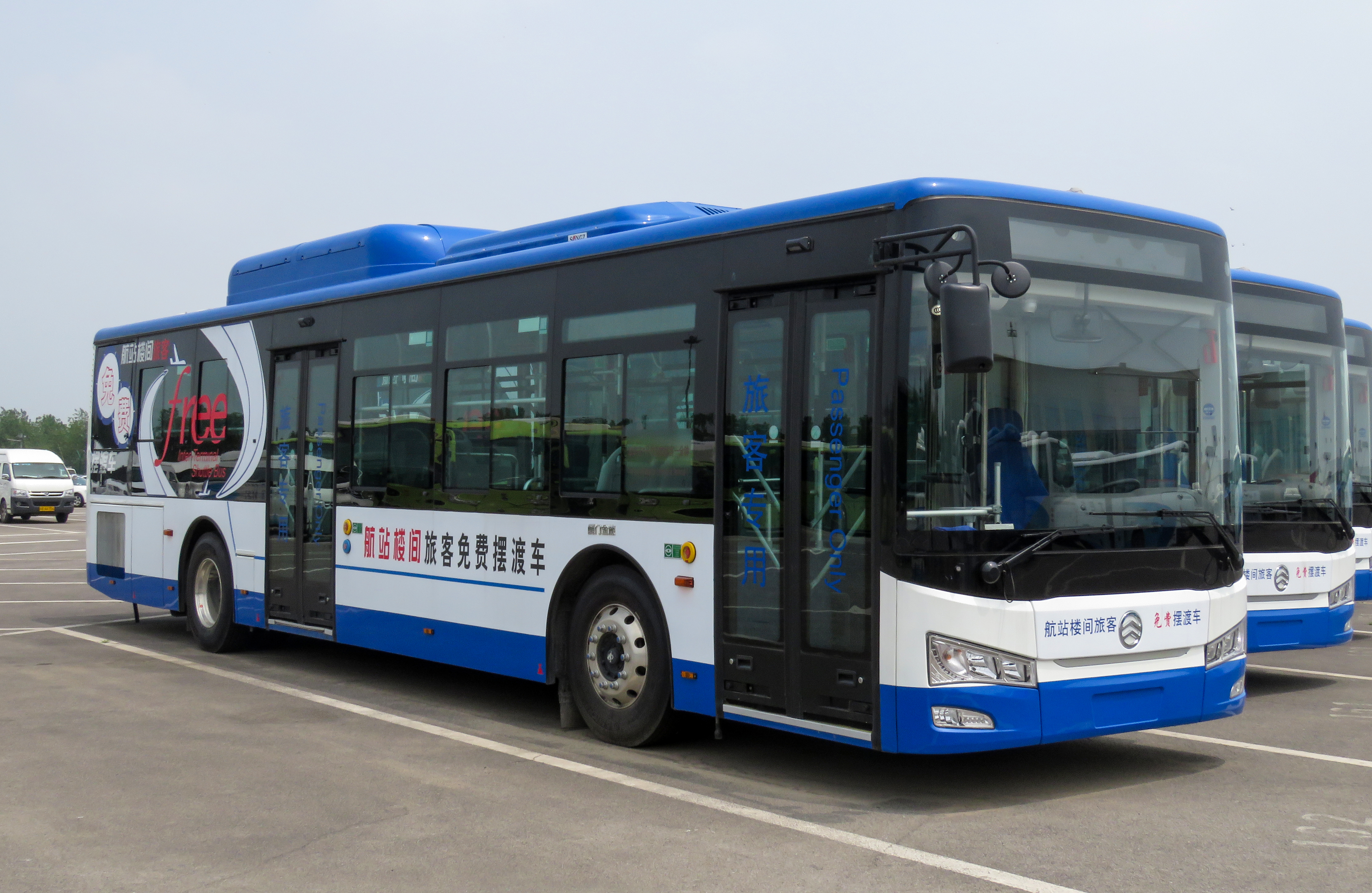
Golden Dragon XML6125JHEVG5CN1 (Chuanliu bodywork) at Beijing Capital International Airport Terminal 3

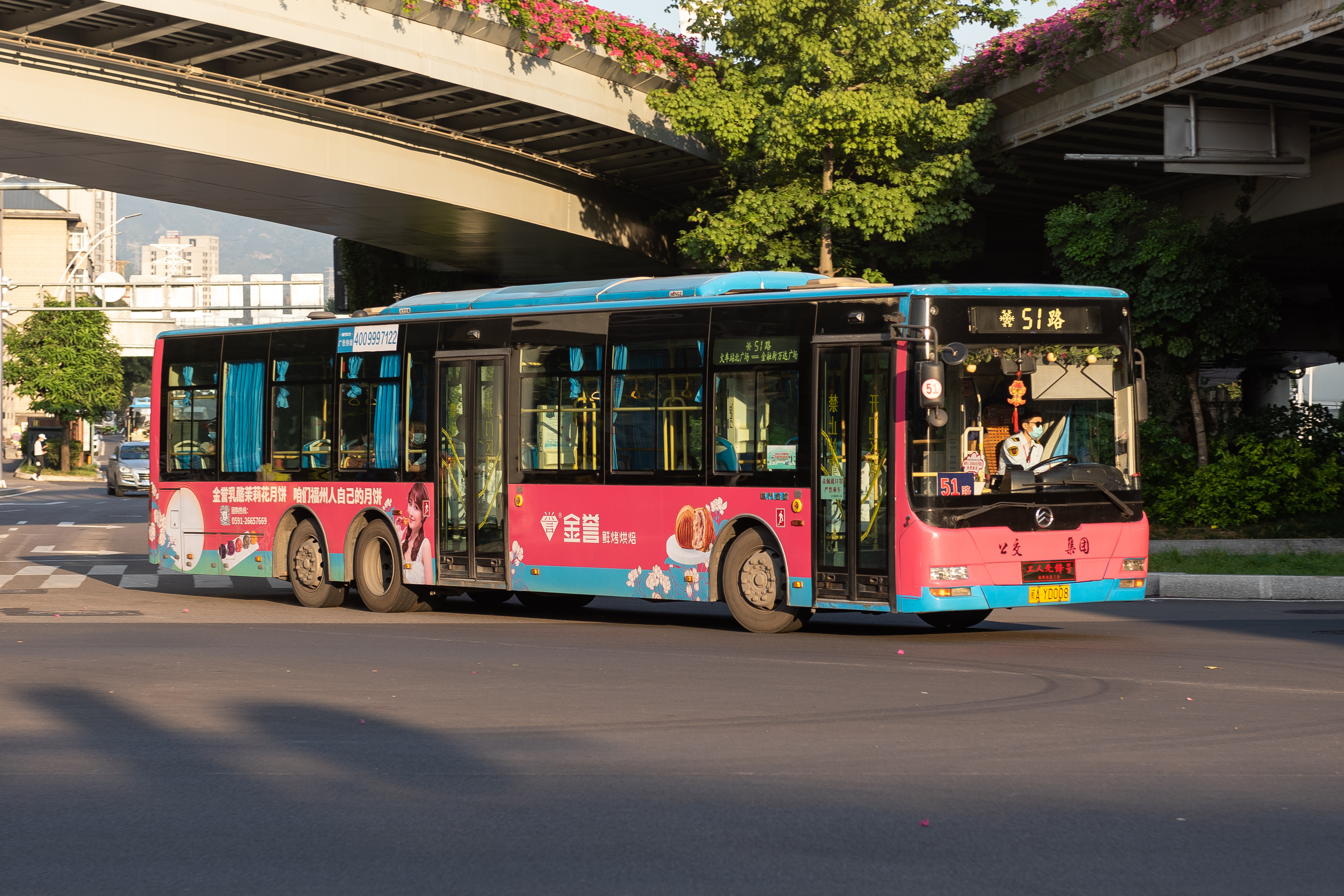
XML6145J98C in Fuzhou

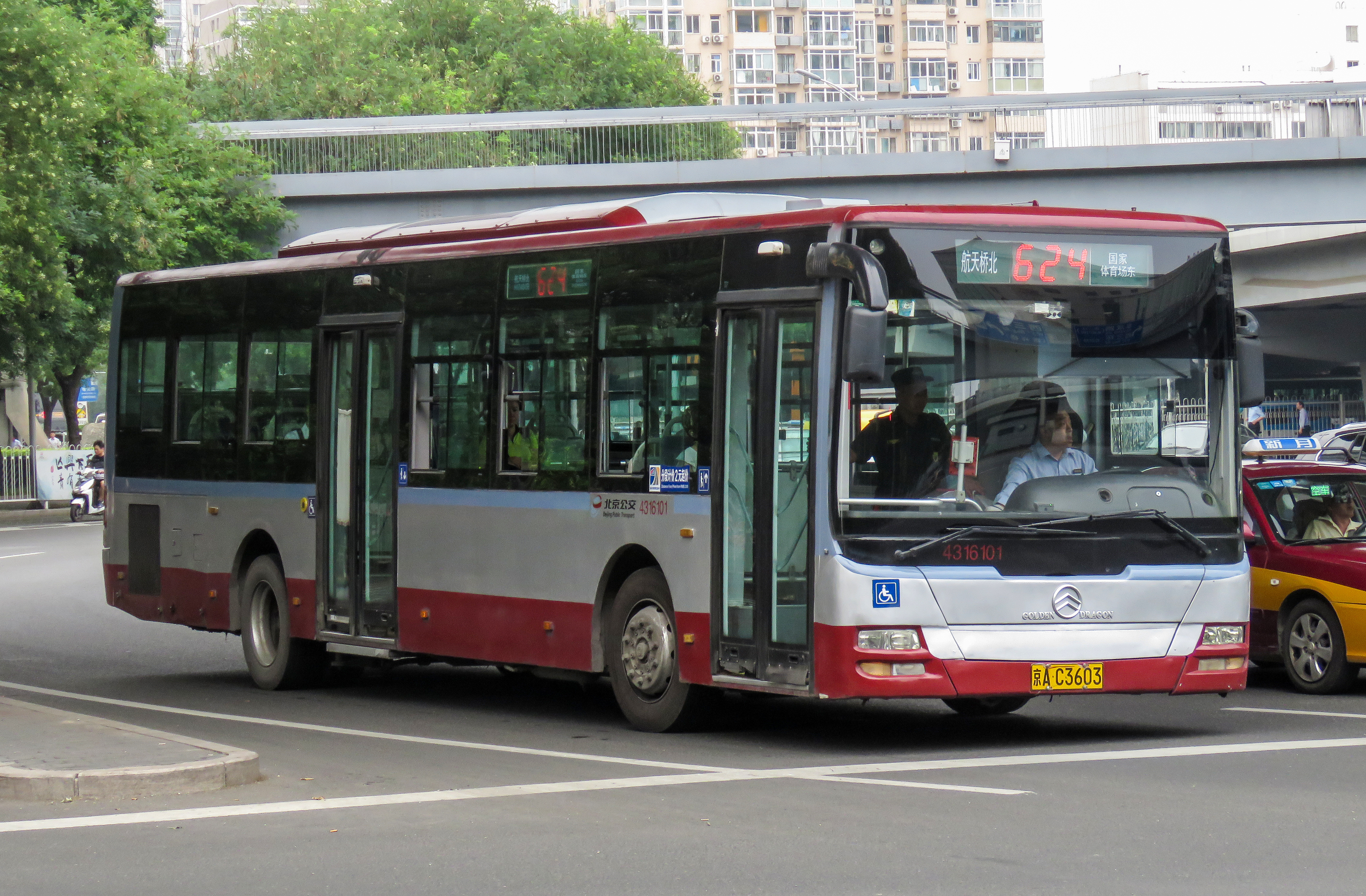
XML6125J93C in Beijing Bus service

- Golden Dragon XML6105JEVD0C1
- Golden Dragon XML6125
- Golden Dragon XML6125CC
- Golden Dragon XML6125CR
- Golden Dragon XML6125CL
- Golden Dragon XML6125CLE
- Golden Dragon XML6125J23C
- Golden Dragon XML6125J93C
- Golden Dragon XML6125JHEVG5CN1
- Golden Dragon XML6115
- Golden Dragon XML6115CK
- Golden Dragon XML6155
- Golden Dragon XML6180J
- Golden Dragon XML6845
- Golden Dragon XML6925J13CN

==== Coaches ====
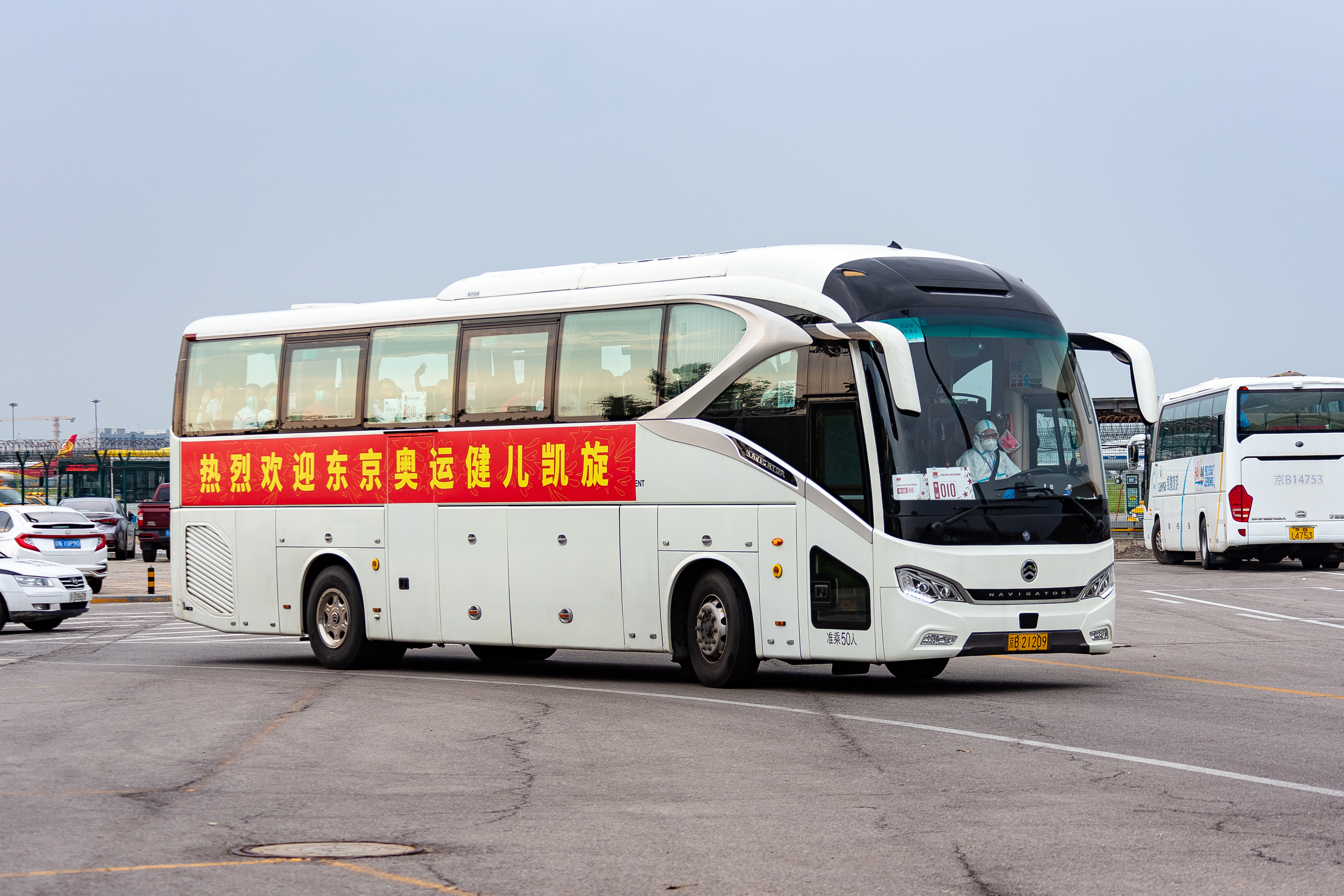
A Golden Dragon Navigator leaving Beijing Capital International Airport with Chinese sportspeople participating in the 2020 Summer Olympics on board

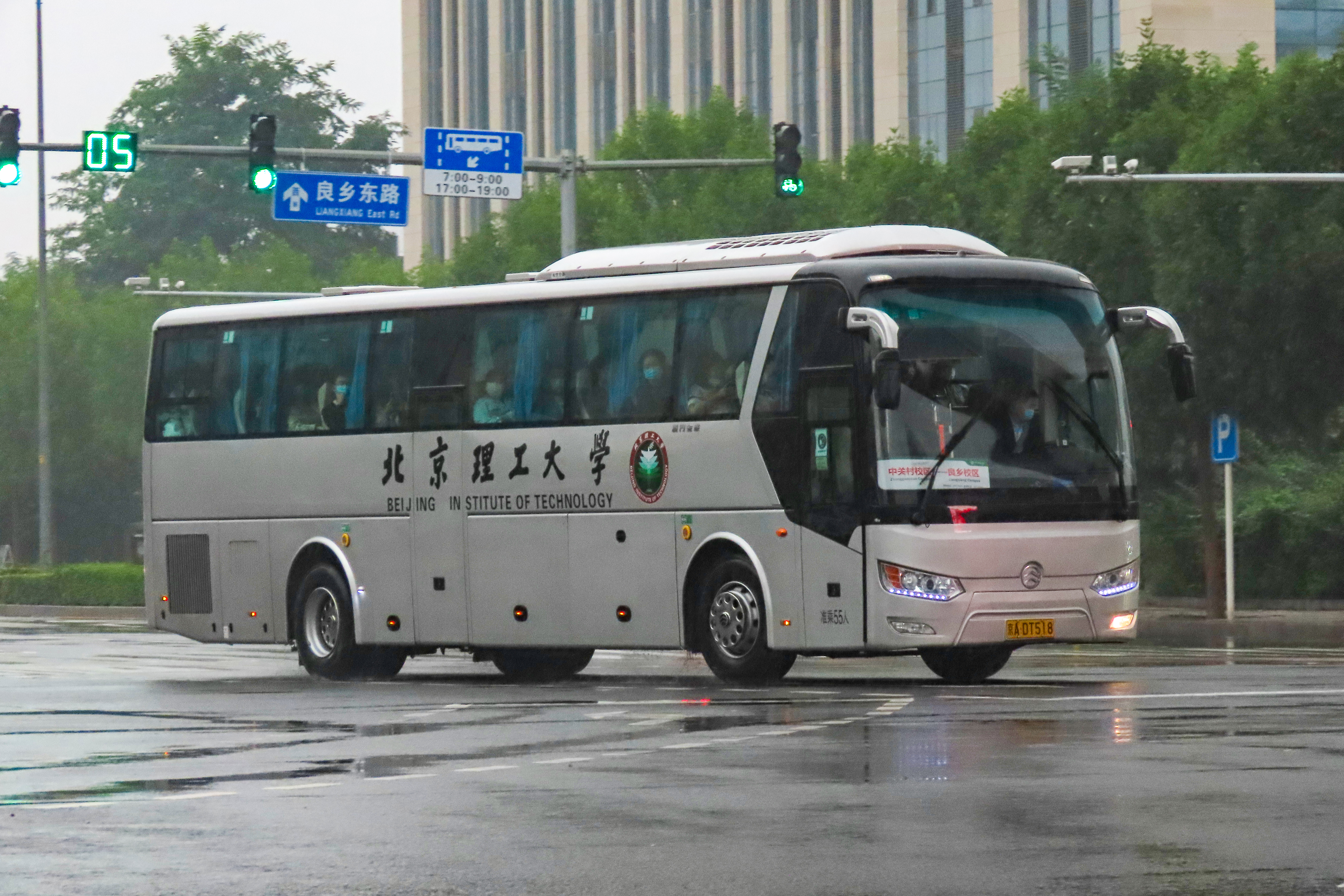
A Golden Dragon XML6122J15Y "Triumph" running the school bus service of Beijing Institute of Technology

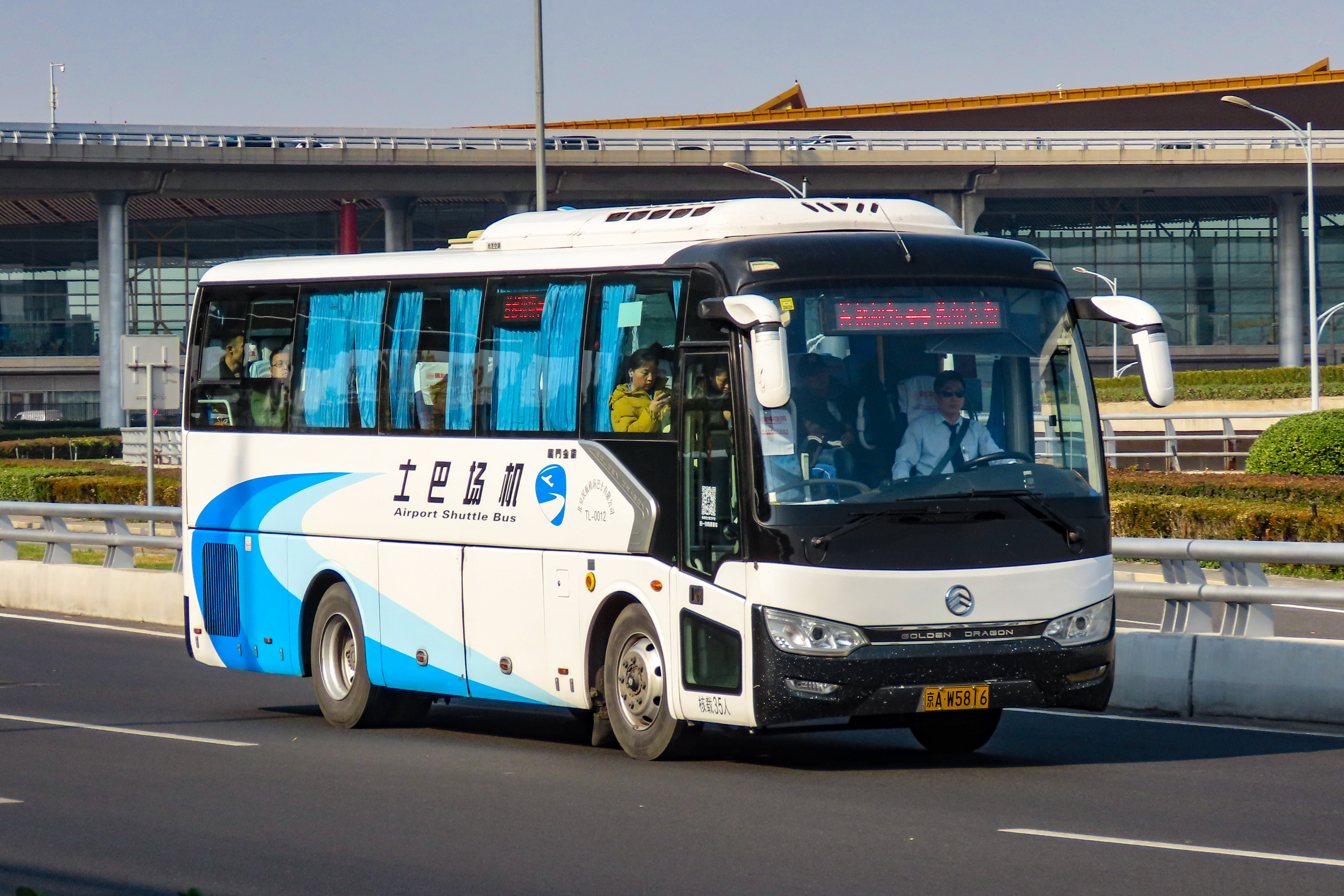
Golden Dragon Splendour leaving Beijing Capital International Airport Terminal 3

- XML6103 "Phoenix"
- XML6122 "Triumph"
- XML6126 "Superstar"
- XML6129E5G "Grand Cruiser"
- XML6852/XML6807J12/XML6857J12/XML6907J12/XML6957J13/XML6102 (exclusive for PH market) "Splendour"
- XML6125J23 "Explorer"
- XML6129J18 "Navigator"

=== Intercity buses ===
- Golden Dragon XML6103J92
- Golden Dragon XML6121E51G
- Golden Dragon XML6127D52
- Golden Dragon XML6127D53

=== Midibuses ===
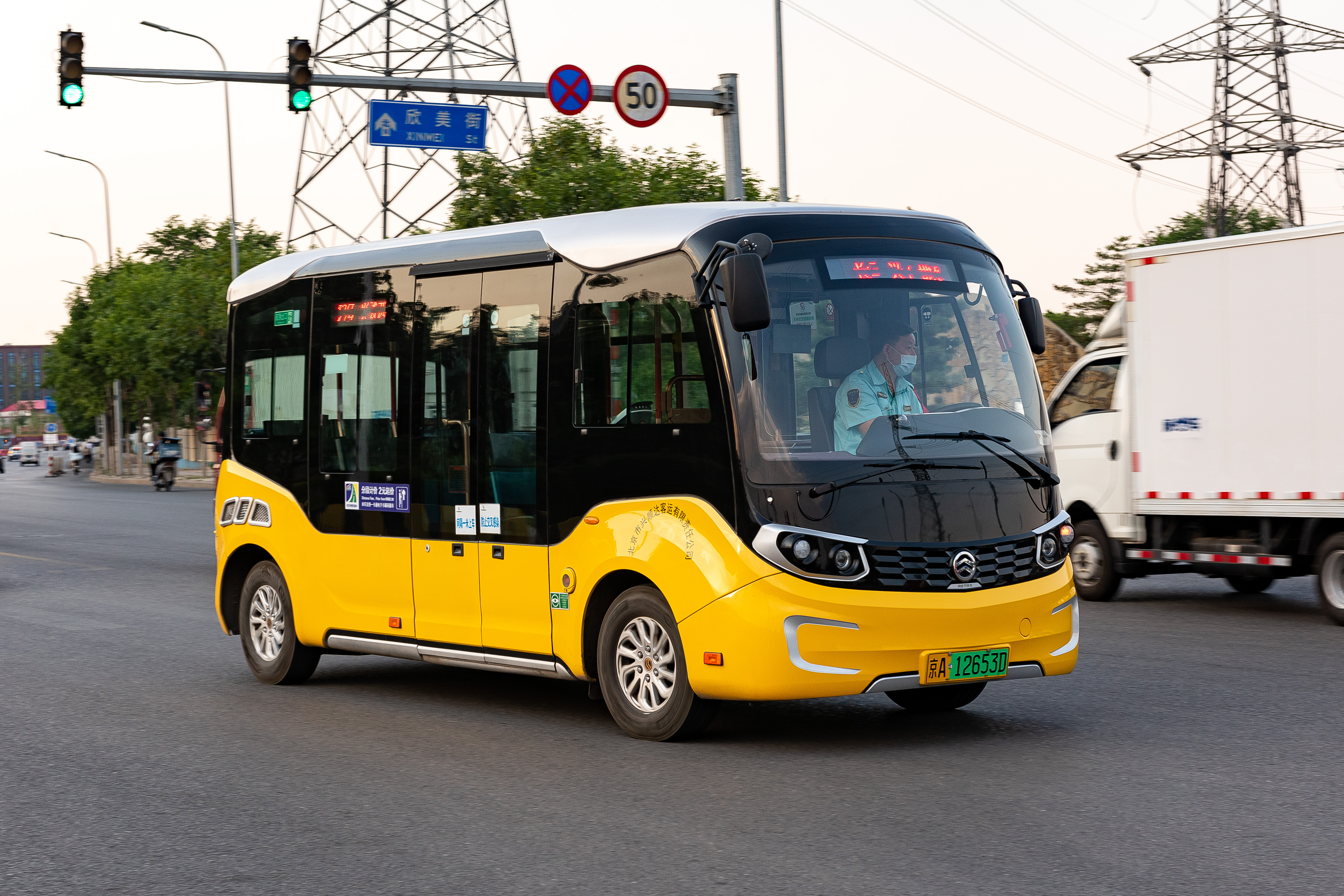
XML6606JEVY0C1 in Daxing, Beijing

- Golden Dragon XML6700 (licensed Toyota Coaster production), also produced as an electric bus by Nanjing Golden Dragon Bus as the NJL6706EV
- Golden Dragon XML6606
- Golden Dragon XML6807
- Golden Dragon XML6855
- Golden Dragon XML6857

=== Special vehicles ===
- Golden Dragon XML6723 school bus
- Golden Dragon XML6901 school bus
- Golden Dragon XML6700 police bus
- Golden Dragon XML6127 police bus
- Golden Dragon police command bus

=== SUVs ===
- Golden Dragon Righto V3

=== Vans ===
- Golden Dragon V3/ Golden Dragon XML6532 (Xiamen Golden Dragon Hiace)
- Golden Dragon V4
- Golden Dragon X5
- Golden Dragon Z4
- Golden Dragon Haishi Longyun series
  - Golden Dragon Haishi Longyun GLE550
  - Golden Dragon Haishi Longyun GLE570
  - Golden Dragon Haishi Longyun GLE650
  - Golden Dragon Haishi Longyun GLE850
  - Golden Dragon Haishi Longyun GLE850S

== Coaches and city buses (Philippine market) ==
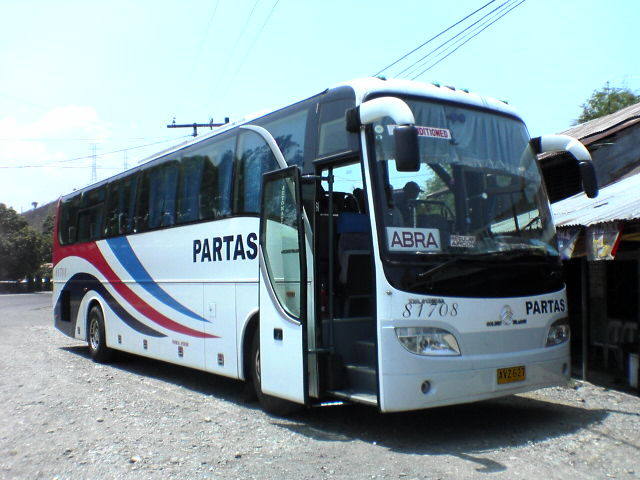
A Golden Dragon XML6129E Grand Cruiser in the Philippines

In 2012, Golden Dragon Bus appointed a new distributor and assembler, Trans-Oriental Motor Builders, Inc., located in Naic, Cavite of the Philippines.

- XML6127 "Marcopolo II"
    - Series I - uses headlamps for Golden Dragon XML6103 "Phoenix" on front and rear
    - Series II - uses headlamps for Golden Dragon XML6957 "Triumph" on front, XML6103/XML6127J6 on rear
    - Series III - uses headlamps for Golden Dragon XML6122 "Triumph" on front and rear
- XML6127 "Marcopolo"
- XML6103 "Marcopolo II"
    - Series I - uses headlamps for Golden Dragon XML6103 "Phoenix" on front and rear
    - Series II - uses headlamps for Golden Dragon XML6957 "Triumph" on front, XML6103/XML6127J6 on rear
    - Series III - uses headlamps for Golden Dragon XML6122 "Triumph" on front and rear
- XML6102 "Splendour"
- XML6125J28C "Chuanliu"
- XML6129J18 "Navigator"
