= Hycan A06 =

Electric mid-size sedan

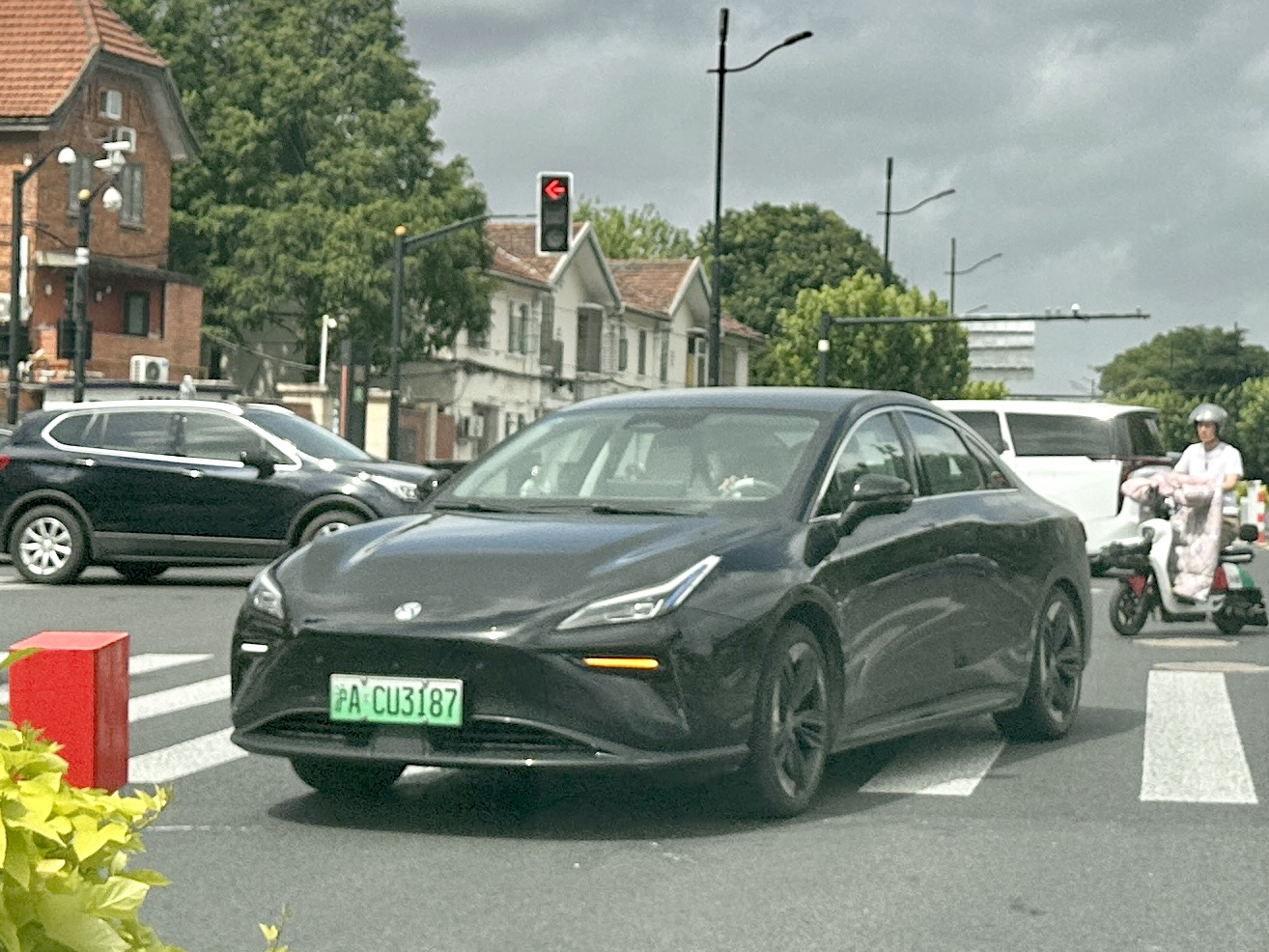

Overview
- Manufacturer: Hycan
- Also called: Elaris Jaco (Germany); Kantanka Mensah (Ghana)
- Production: 2022–2025 (Hycan; China); 2024–present (Germany / Ghana)
- Assembly: China: Hangzhou, Zhejiang

Body and chassis
- Class: Mid-size car
- Body style: 4-door sedan
- Layout: Front-motor, FWD; Dual motors, AWD
- Platform: H-GEA
- Related: Hycan V09

Powertrain
- Electric motor: Permanent magnet synchronous
- Power output: 184–462 hp (137–345 kW; 187–468 PS)
- Transmission: 1-speed direct-drive
- Battery: 60.04 kWh LFP CALB; 71 kWh NMC
- Electric range: 520–630 km (323–391 mi) (CLTC)

Dimensions
- Wheelbase: 2,850 mm (112.2 in)
- Length: 4,965 mm (195.5 in)
- Width: 1,920 mm (75.6 in)
- Height: 1,520 mm (59.8 in)
- Kerb weight: 1,740 kg (3,836 lb)

The Hycan A06 is a battery electric mid-size sedan that is manufactured by Hycan. The A06 was officially launched in the Chinese market in August 2022.

== Overview ==
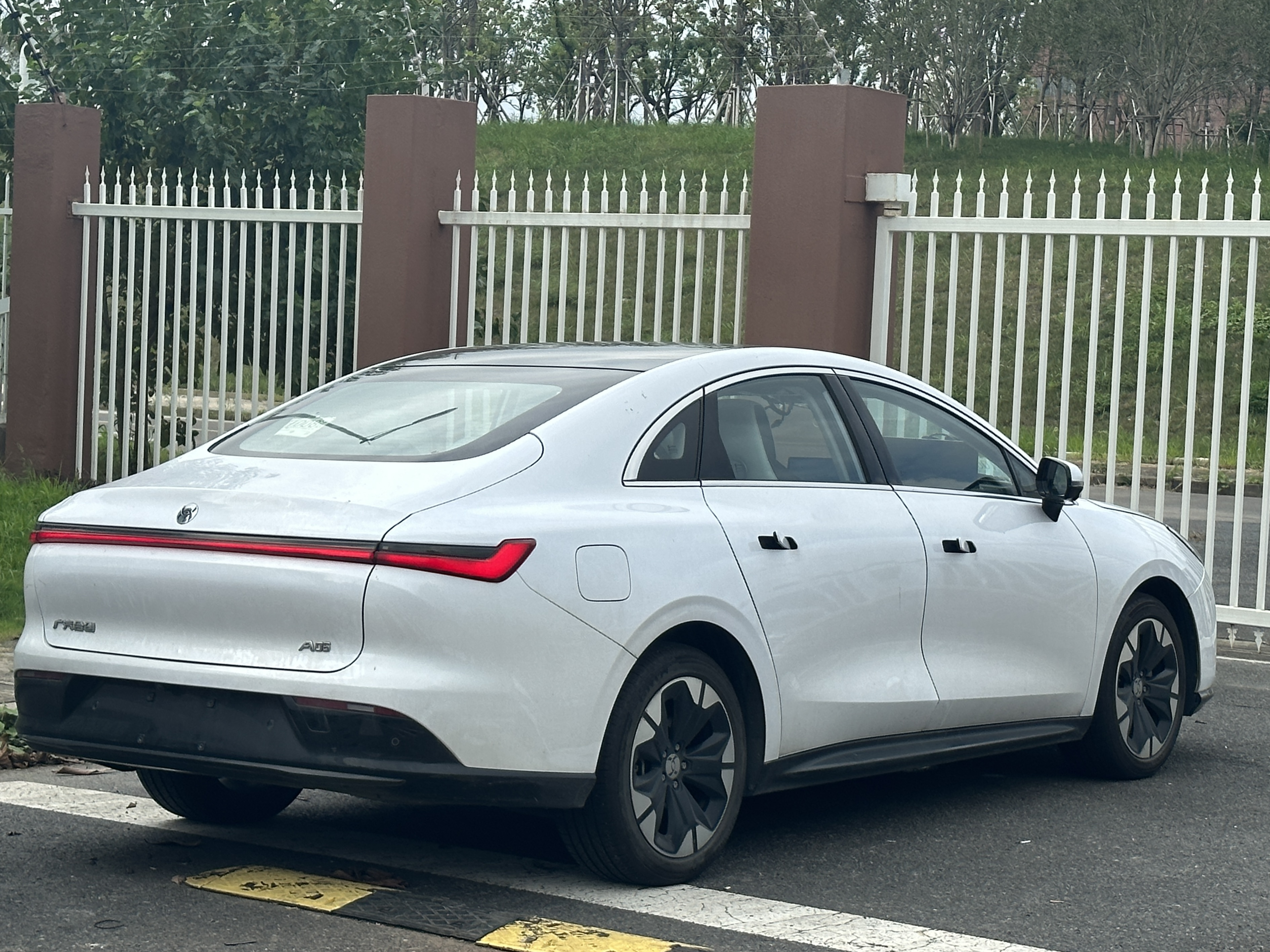
Rear view

At the beginning of December 2022, Hycan presented its third production model and its first sedan, complementing the existing electric crossovers in the lineup. Its premiere was preceded by the debut of the Hycan Concept-S prototype in November 2021, while the production model was given the name Hycan A06. The car took the form of a large, less than 5-meter long upper-class sedan, distinguished by a slim, elongated silhouette with a pointed, sharply outlined front. Its shape was dictated by the desire to obtain the best possible aerodynamic properties, which resulted in a record value. With a drag coefficient of 0.217 C_{d}, Hycan claims the A06 is the most streamlined Chinese car.

The A06 is the first Hycan car built after the withdrawal from the joint-venture startup Nio and the initiative taken over entirely by GAC Group. Unlike the company's previous designs which are based on existing GAC Aion models, the A06 uses a dedicated platform made of 65% high-performance steel.

The A06 passenger cabin has a minimalist design with light tones of finishing materials. The dashboard features two digital LCD displays: a 10.25-inch virtual instrument display and a central 14.6-inch touchscreen. It supports Hycan's own operating system called HI-OS, compatible with the extensive Hycan Pilot semi-autonomous driving system.

=== Hycan A06 Plus ===
In November 2023, during the Guangzhou Auto Show, a facelift variant called A06 Plus was presented. It is distinguished mainly by the styling of the front fascia, which is characterized by the division of the headlights into a horizontal light strip and additional lamp shades. The interior also uses a different steering wheel, while technical parameters remain unchanged.

== Specifications ==
The A06's top powertrain consists of two electric motors transmitting power to each axle and develops a total of 462 hp (345 kW; 468 PS) and 534 N⋅m (394 lb⋅ft) of torque, achieving a top speed of 180 km/h (110 mph), and a 0–100 km/h (62 mph) acceleration time of 3.7 seconds. The 71 kWh battery offers approximately 560 km (350 mi) of range on a single charge. In addition, there are two cheaper and slower variants with one electric motor with a power of 181 hp (135 kW; 184 PS) or 215 hp (160 kW; 218 PS).

== Sales ==
The Hycan A06 has been built exclusively for the domestic Chinese market, with pre-sales opening ahead of its August 2022 launch. Deliveries of the first units began in mid-December of the same year, starting with units in cheaper basic drive variants. The price of the cheapest A06 has been set at 179,800 yuan, with 269,800 yuan for the top-of-the-range Performance variant. In September 2023, the local startup Elaris expressed its willingness to sell in Germany under the name Elaris Jaco.

Year	China
2022	319
2023	1,290
2024	1,520
2025	57
