= Hycan V09 =

Chinese minivan

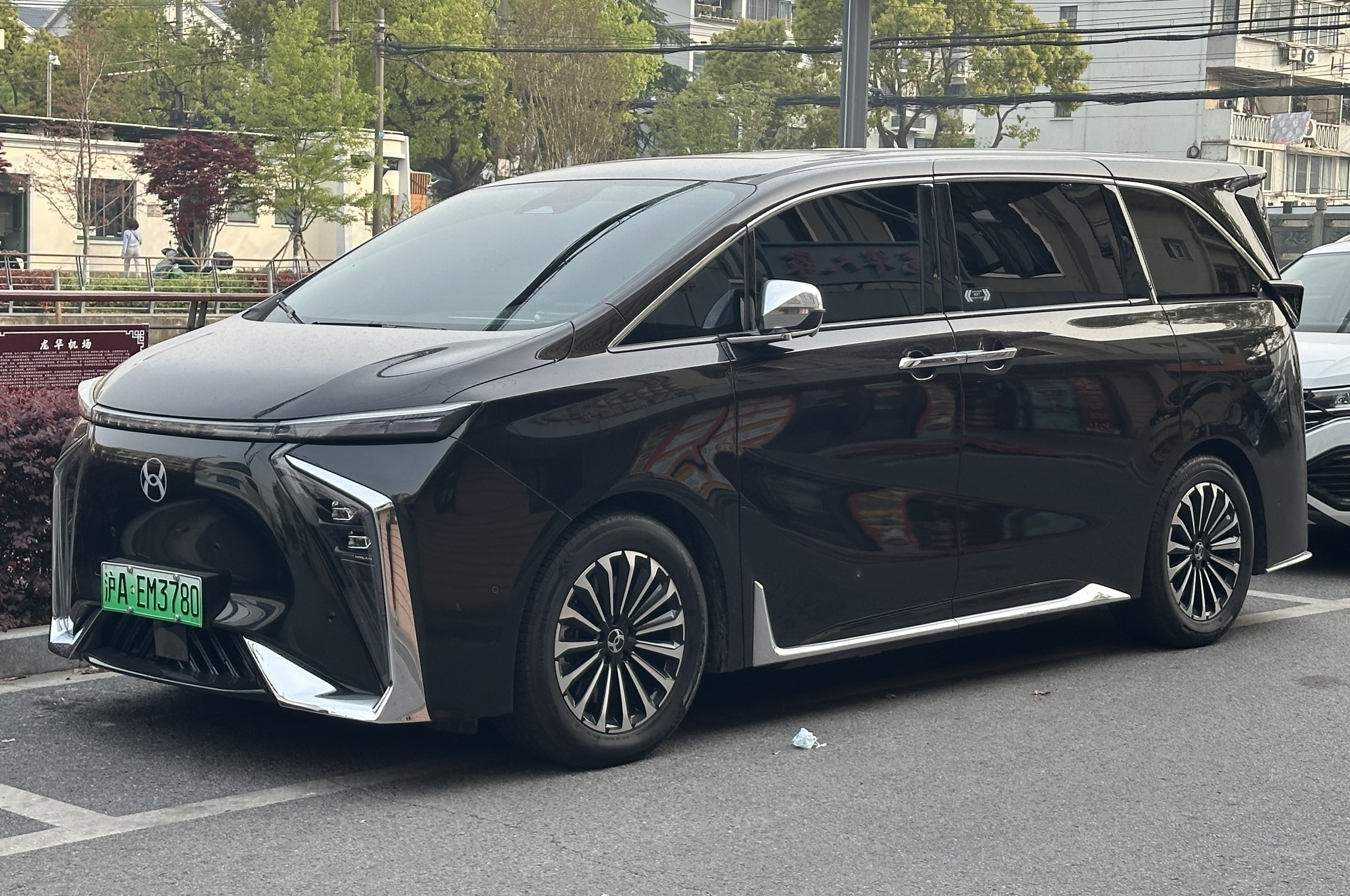

Overview
- Manufacturer: Hycan
- Production: 2023–2025
- Assembly: China: Hangzhou, Zhejiang

Body and chassis
- Class: Minivan
- Body style: 5-door minivan
- Layout: Front-motor, front-wheel-drive
- Platform: H-GEA
- Related: Hycan A06

Powertrain
- Electric motor: Permanent magnet synchronous
- Power output: 275 PS (202 kW; 271 hp)
- Transmission: 1-speed direct-drive
- Battery: 92 kWh NMC Juwan; 95.16 kWh LFP CALB; 114.19 kWh NMC CALB
- Range: 620–762 km (385–473 mi) (CLTC)

Dimensions
- Wheelbase: 3,170 mm (124.8 in)
- Length: 5,125 mm (201.8 in)
- Width: 1,967 mm (77.4 in)
- Height: 1,910 mm (75.2 in)
- Curb weight: 2,590–2,655 kg (5,710–5,853 lb)

The Hycan V09 is a battery electric minivan produced by Hycan. It was launched on the Chinese car market in October 2023.

== Overview ==
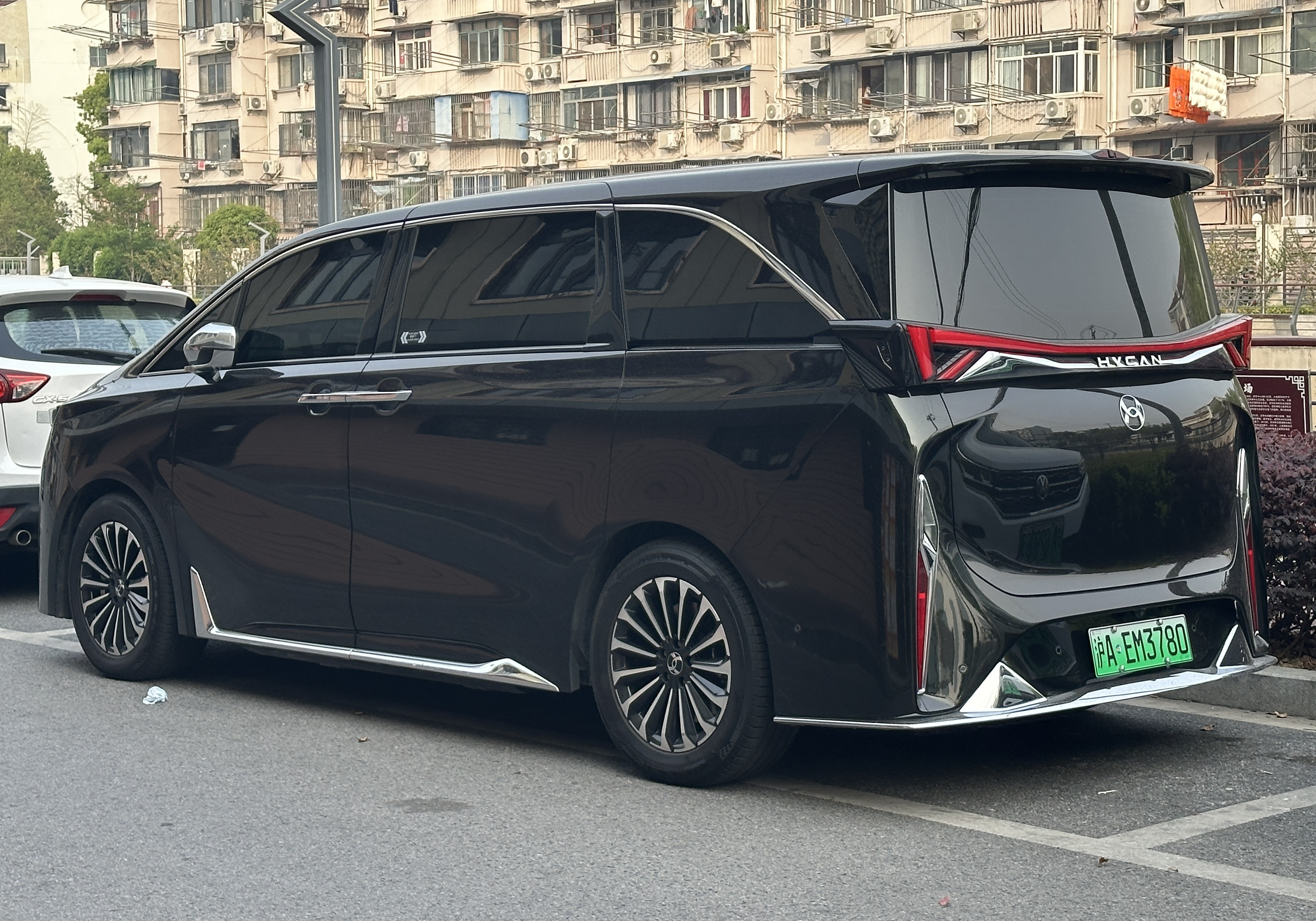
Rear view

In November 2021, during the Guangzhou Auto Show, Hycan presented two prototypes announcing the expansion of the model range with the first non-crossover cars. One of them was a large, luxurious electric minivan in the form of the Hycan Concept-M. The presentation of the production vehicle took place less than a year later at the end of December 2022. Preorders opened on September 10 2023, with deliveries beginning the following month on October 13. The V09 expanded the range of the Chinese company as the first such large vehicle, together with the parallel debut of the A06, based on the new, dedicated H-GEA platform created using high-performance steel.

The V09 follows Hycan's Shining Star design language and is decorated with sharp lines, with sliding doors to the second row of seats, as well as a high line of windows and LED lighting. The double-row headlights form two lampshades, in turn, among others: sensors for the second-level semi-autonomous driving assistant are hidden in the mirrors.

The V09 is a 7-seater with a 2+2+3 seating layout. The dashboard contains a 10.25-inch digital instrument panel, a 14.6-inch central infotainment touchscreen, and a 12.3-inch passenger entertainment display all powered by a Qualcomm Snapdragon 8155 SoC; additionally, rear passengers have access to a ceiling-mounted 17.3-inch folding entertainment screen. The center console contains two wireless charging pads and a refrigerator compartment, and it is equipped with a 22-speaker sound system.

The seats are upholstered in Nappa and synthetic leather. The first and second rows feature standard power adjustment, with optional heating, ventilation, and 8-point massage functions. Additionally, the second-row seats offer 14-way power adjustment, including leg rests and a 'zero-gravity' recline function. The V09 has a 610-litre (21.5 cu ft) rear cargo area, which expands to 2,430 L (85.8 cu ft) with the third row seats folded down creating a flat floor; it also has a 32-litre (1.1 cu ft) frunk.

The V09 is equipped with a 23-sensor suite consisting of a 130-line LiDAR, 5 mmWave radars, an HD camera, 4 surround-view cameras, and 12 ultrasonic sensors, which feed data to an Ambarella CV22 and a dedicated Qualcomm Snapdragon 8155 SoC capable of 8 TOPS to enable H-VIP 3.0 systems' ADAS and parking assistance functions.

== Powertrain ==
All versions of the V09 have a battery electric powertrain consisting of a single front motor outputting 271 hp (202 kW; 275 PS) and 335 N⋅m (247 lb⋅ft) of torque, allowing for a top speed of 190 km/h (118 mph). It is equipped with 800 V silicon-carbide power electronics and a choice of three batteries: a 92 kWh NMC pack produced by Juwan Technology Research or a 95.16 kWh LFP pack supplied by CALB both capable of 620 km (385 mi) CLTC range ratings, or a 114.2 kWh NMC pack CALB-supplied pack capable of 762 km (473 mi). A 5-minute charge can charge the batteries with up to 200 km (120 mi) of range, with 380 kW peak charging speeds.

== Sales ==
Year	China
2023	971
2024	845
2025	356
