= Elaris =

German electric vehicle company

Elaris GmbH
- Company type: Private
- Industry: Automotive
- Founded: 2020; 6 years ago
- Headquarters: Grünstadt, Rhineland-Palatinate, Germany
- Area served: Germany
- Key people: Lars Stevenson (CEO); Andreas Matthis (COO)
- Products: Electric vehicles
- Website: www.elaris.eu

Elaris AG is a German automotive company founded in 2020, in Grünstadt, Rhineland-Palatinate specializing in marketing Chinese electric vehicles. In January 2025, Elaris filed for insolvency at the local court.

== History ==
Elaris was founded in 2020 in the town of Grünstadt, with the company's first models, the DYO microcar (based on the Dorcen E20) and the Leo compact SUV (based on the Dorcen G60S) launching in May 2021. Later that month, the Skyworth EV6-based Beo mid-size SUV was launched. In June, a second microcar based on the Zhidou D2 (called simply Elaris Zhidou) was revealed. This model was later renamed in August to Elaris Pio.

== Models ==
The following is a list of models sold by Elaris:

- Beo (2021–present), an electric mid-size SUV based on the Skyworth EV6
- DYO (2021–present), an electric microcar based on the Dorcen E20
- Jaco (2024–present), an electric mid-size Sedan based on the Hycan A06
- Lenn (2024–present), an electric compact SUV based on the Hycan Z03

=== Commercial vehicles ===
- Caro Light commercial vehicle based on the Yaxing Eurise
- Caro S Light commercial vehicle based on the Chinese Jinbei Haise S Microvan

=== Historic models ===
- Leo (2020), an electric compact SUV based on the Hycan Z03
- Finn (2021–2023), an electric microcar based on the Zotye E30
- Pio (2021–2023), an electric microcar based on the Zhidou D2
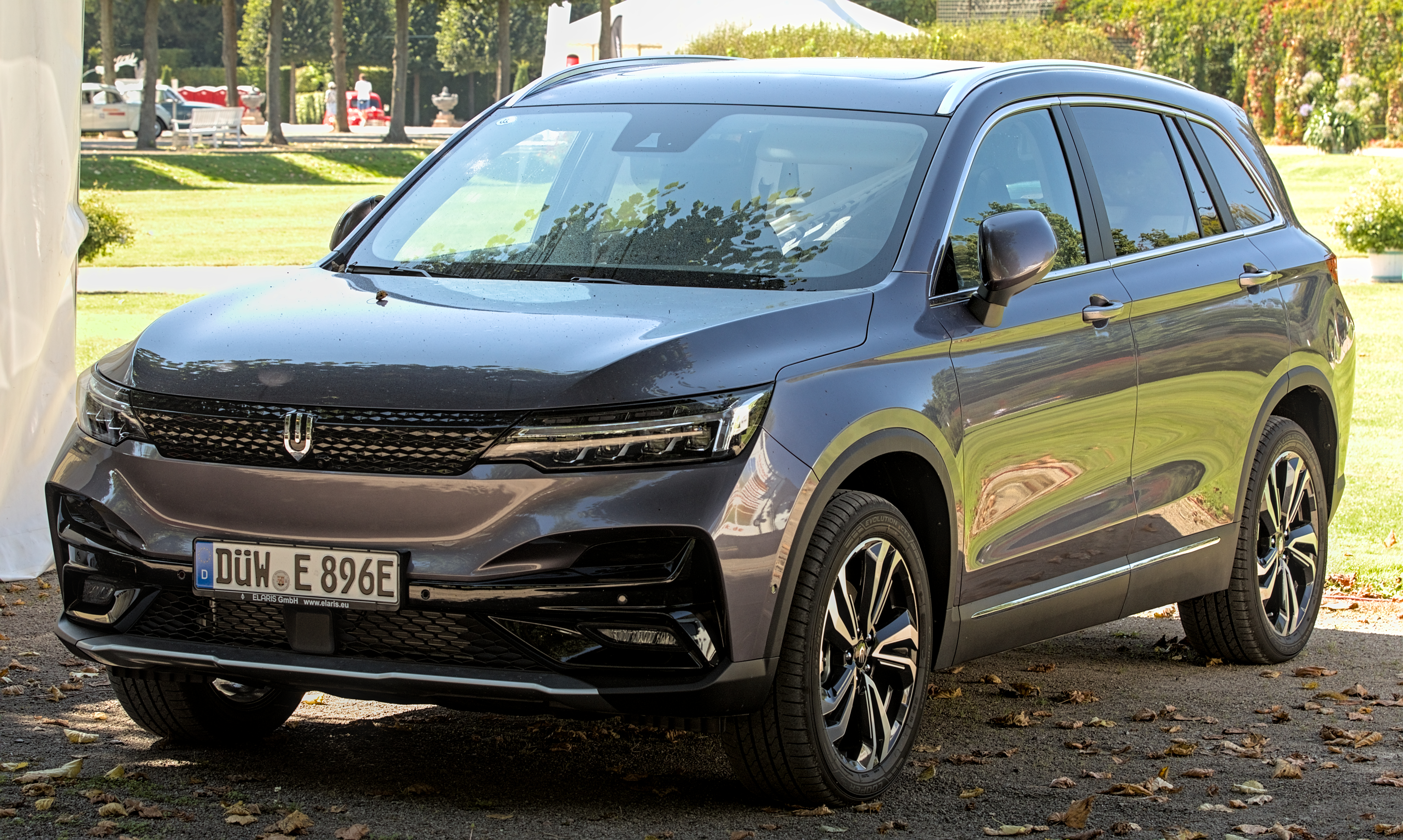
Elaris Beo

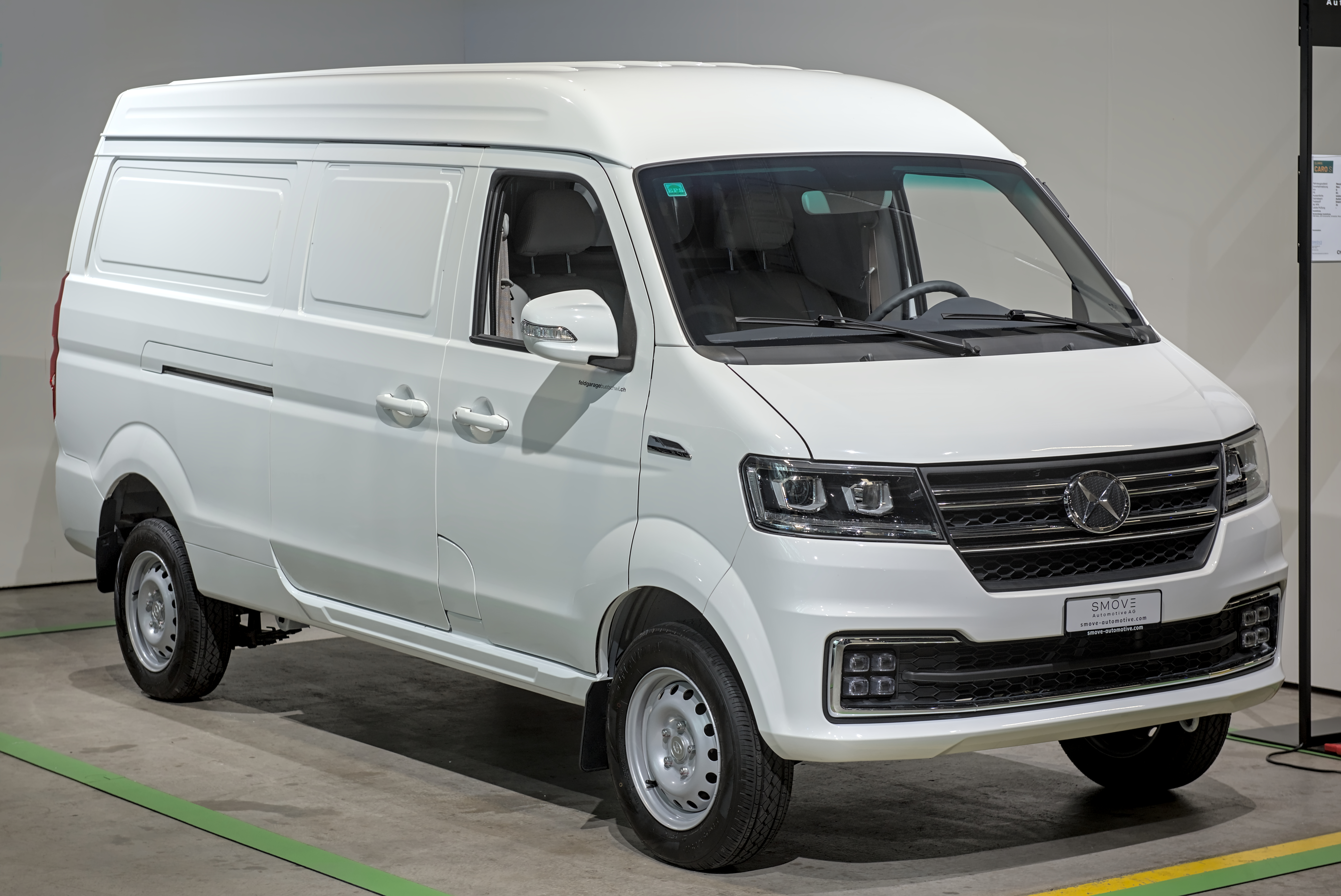
Elaris Caro

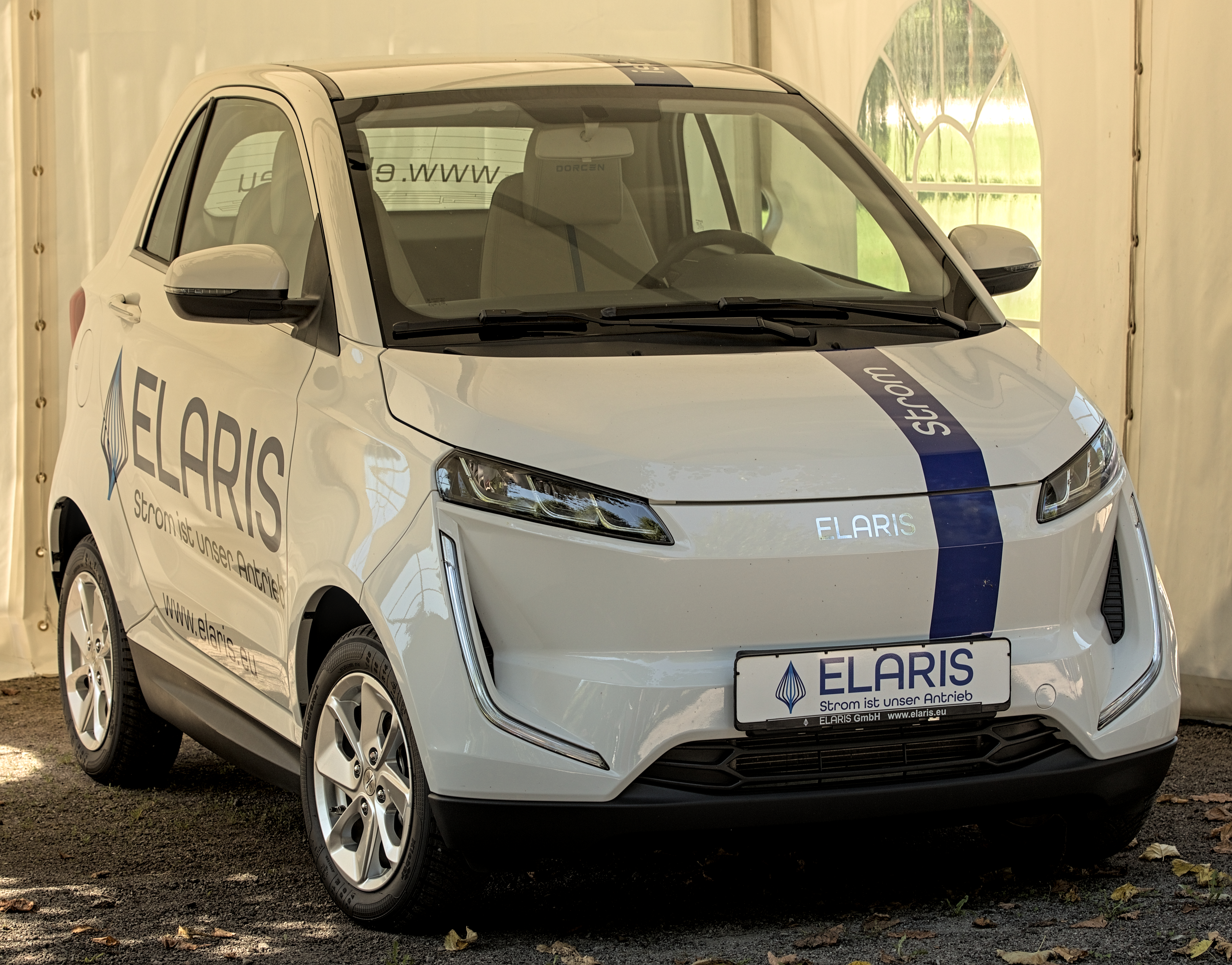
Elaris DYO

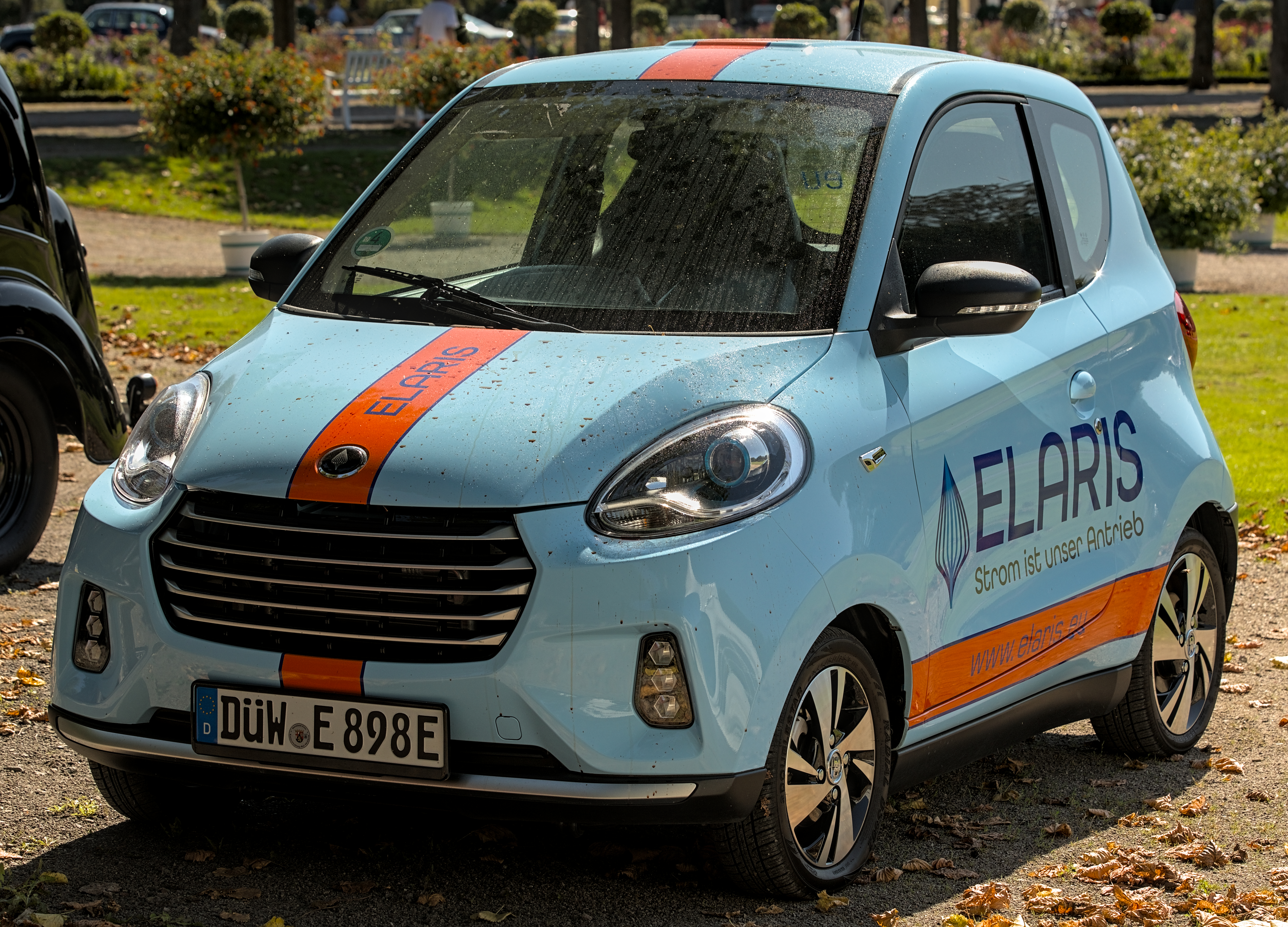
Elaris Pio (2021–2023)
