= Zotye E30 =

Chinese electric car

Zotye E30/Dorcen E20
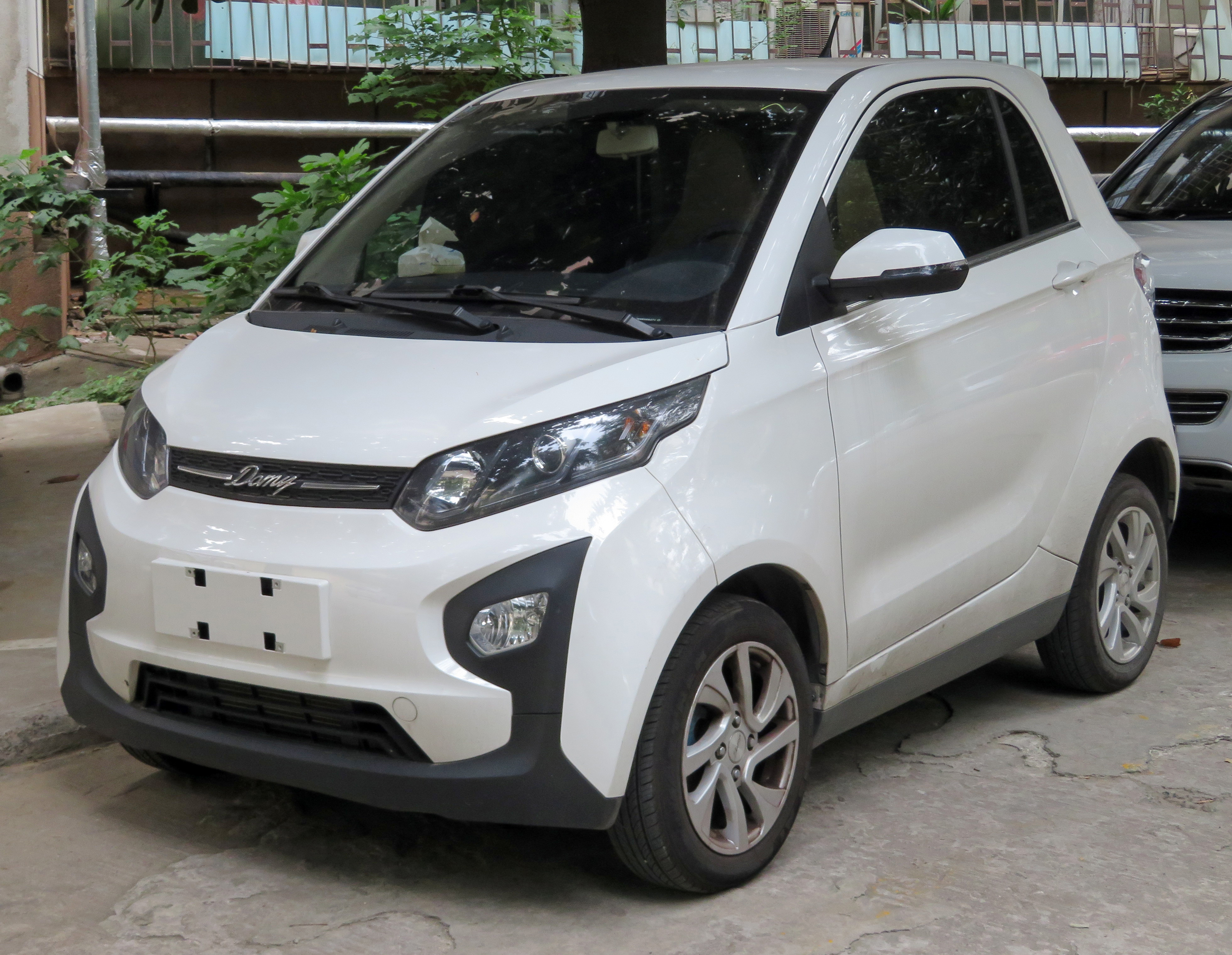

Overview
- Manufacturer: Zotye
- Also called: Zotye E01; Zotye Zhima E30; Zotye Zhima eZ; Zotye Domy Zhima; Dorcen E20; Elaris Finn (Germany); Elaris Dyo (facelift, Germany)
- Production: 2016–2019 (Zotye); 2019–2021 (Dorcen)
- Assembly: China: Pukou, Nanjing

Body and chassis
- Class: Supermini
- Body style: 3-door hatchback

Dimensions
- Wheelbase: 1,572 mm (61.9 in)
- Length: 2,798 mm (110.2 in)
- Width: 1,765 mm (69.5 in)
- Height: 1,563 mm (61.5 in)
- Kerb weight: 785 kg (1,731 lb)

The Zotye Zhima E30 (Chinese: 芝麻) or Zotye E30 is an all-electric car that was manufactured by the Chinese manufacturer Zotye in the mid-2010s. A revised version of the model was later manufactured by Dorcen as the Dorcen E20.

== Overview ==
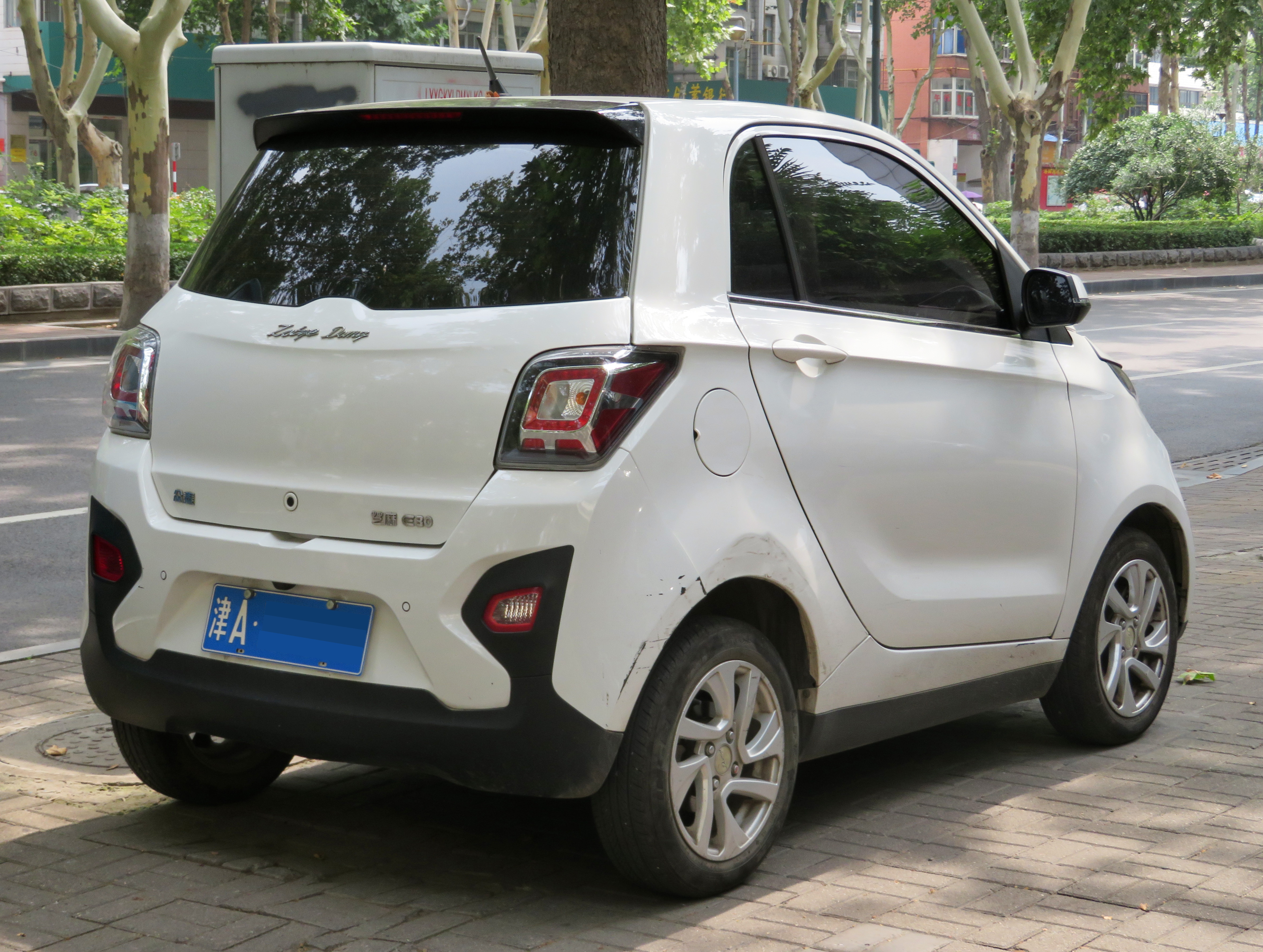
Rear quarter view

The Zotye Zhima E30 was unveiled during the 2016 Shanghai Auto Show in China with prices ranging from 109,800 to 119,800 yuan at that time.

According to the official website, the Zotye Zhima E30 model was later renamed to Zotye Domy Zhima under the Domy product series.

The Zotye Zhima E30 electric city car is powered by an electric motor producing 40 hp (30 kW) and 150 N⋅m (110 lbf⋅ft) of torque to the front wheels. According to Zotye, the Zotye Zhima E30 has a top speed of 80 kilometer per hour and the 16kWh unit battery has a maximum range of 150 kilometers.

== Dorcen E20 ==
As of 2019, the Zotye E30 platform was sold to Dorcen, and after a few redesigns, the model was rebadged as the Dorcen E20. For Europe, badged Elaris Finn, it gets a powertrain upgrade: 35 kW (47 hp), top speed of 115 kilometer per hour and a 31.5 kWh battery (Li ternary chemistry, so NMC) with 265 km of range (WLTP), rechargeable in 5h (AC, 5-100%) or 45 min (DC, 30-80%). This is similar to Chinese spec from model year 2019.

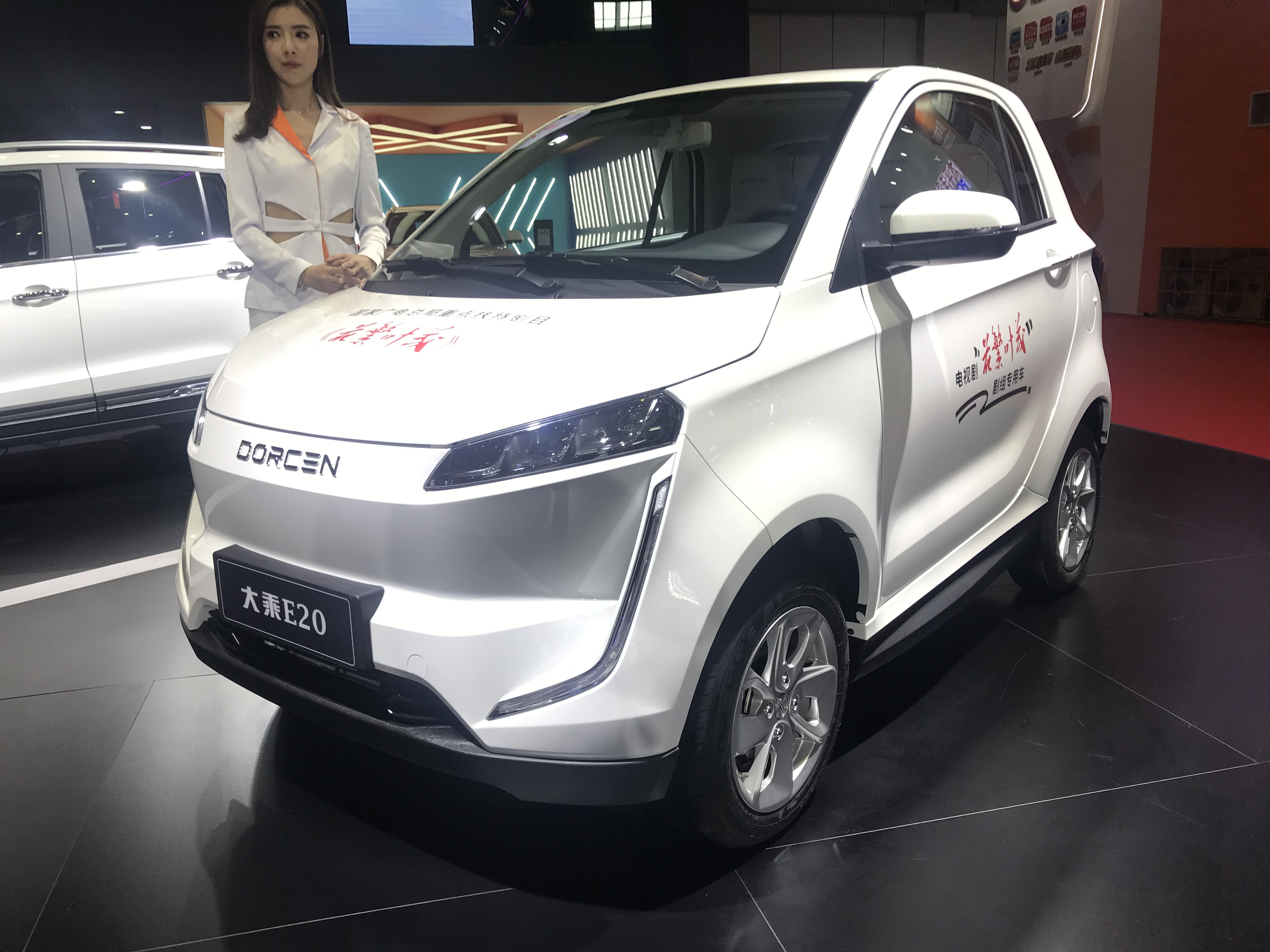
Dorcen E20

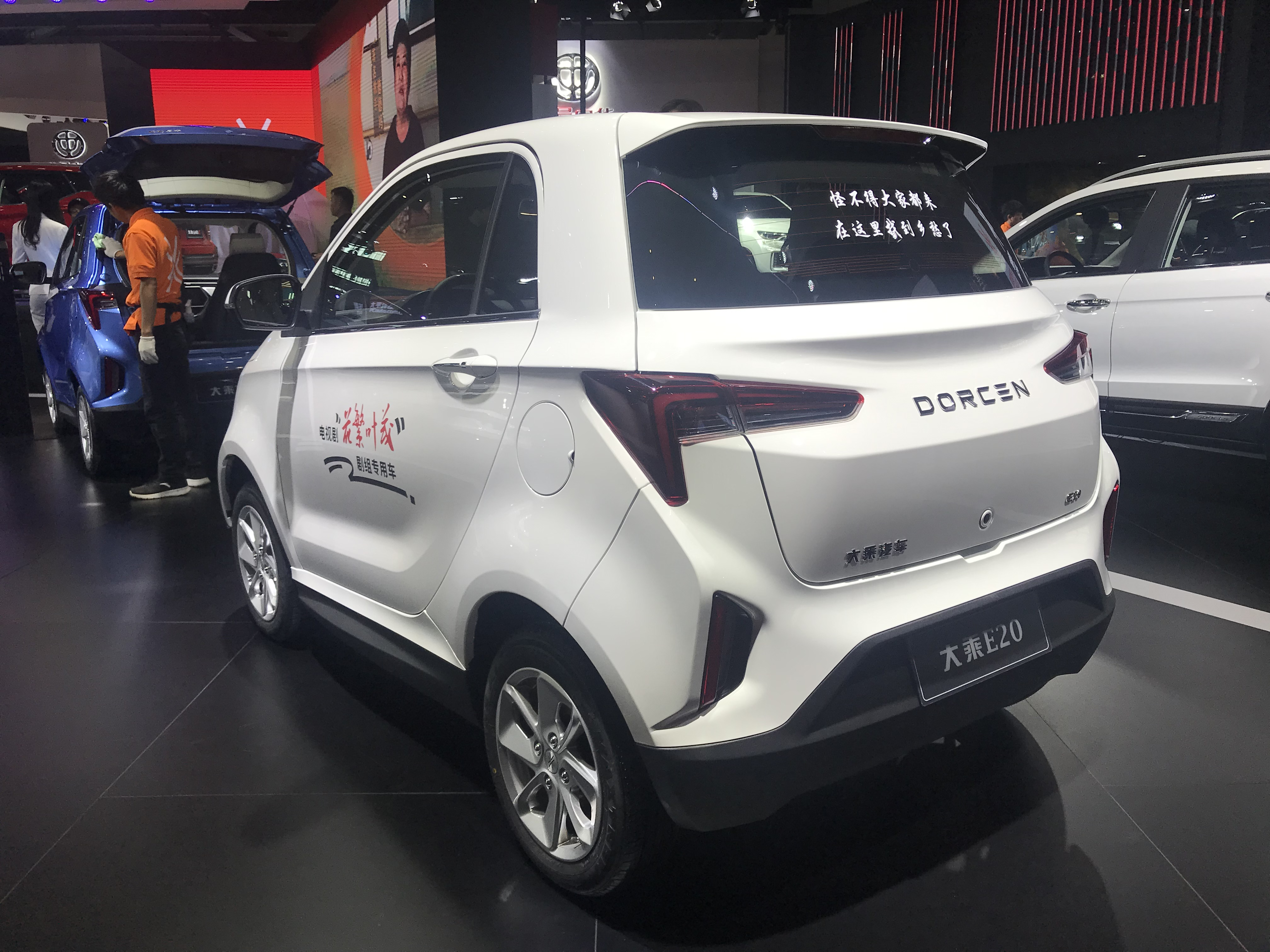
Dorcen E20 rear quarter view

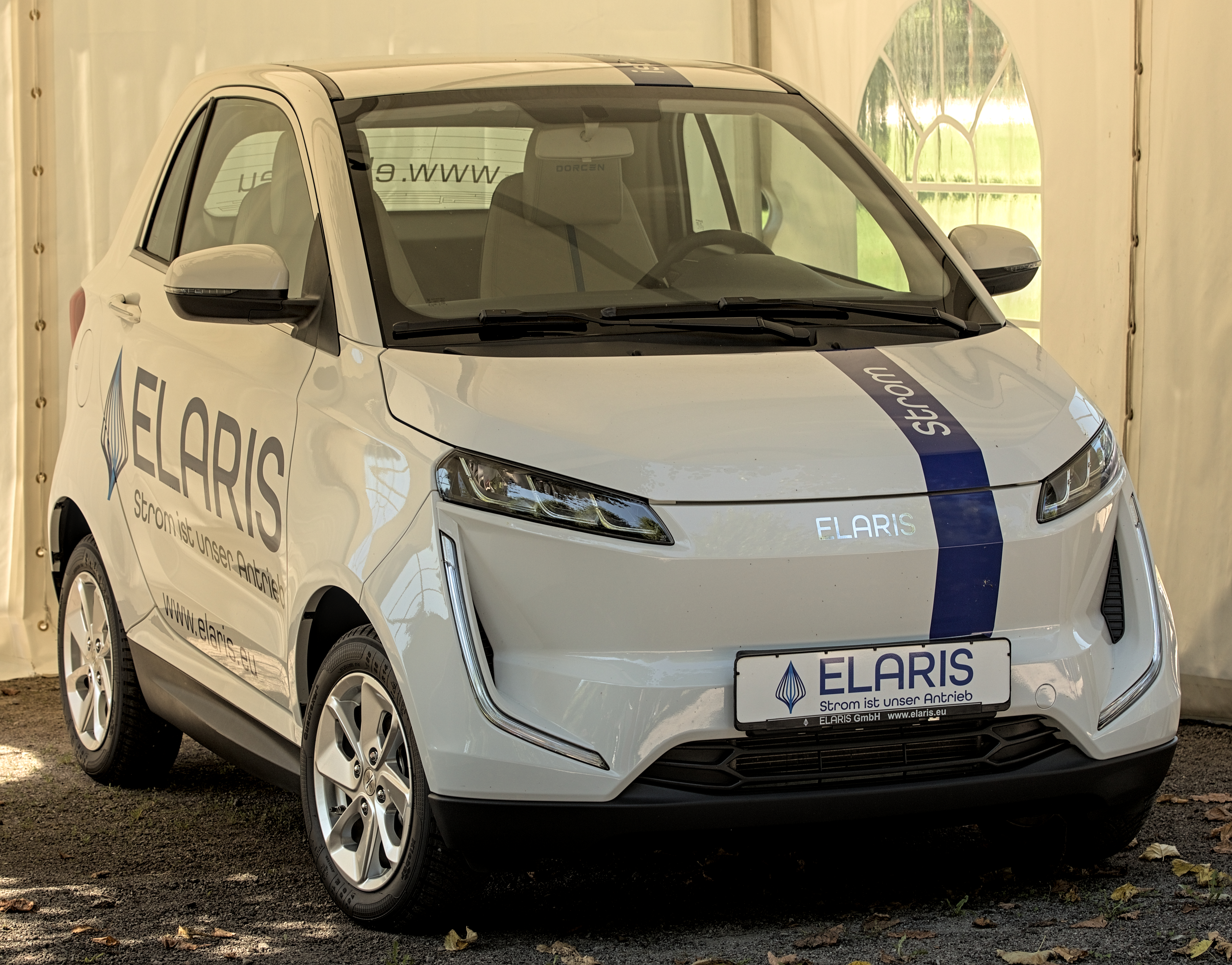
Elaris Finn (Germany)

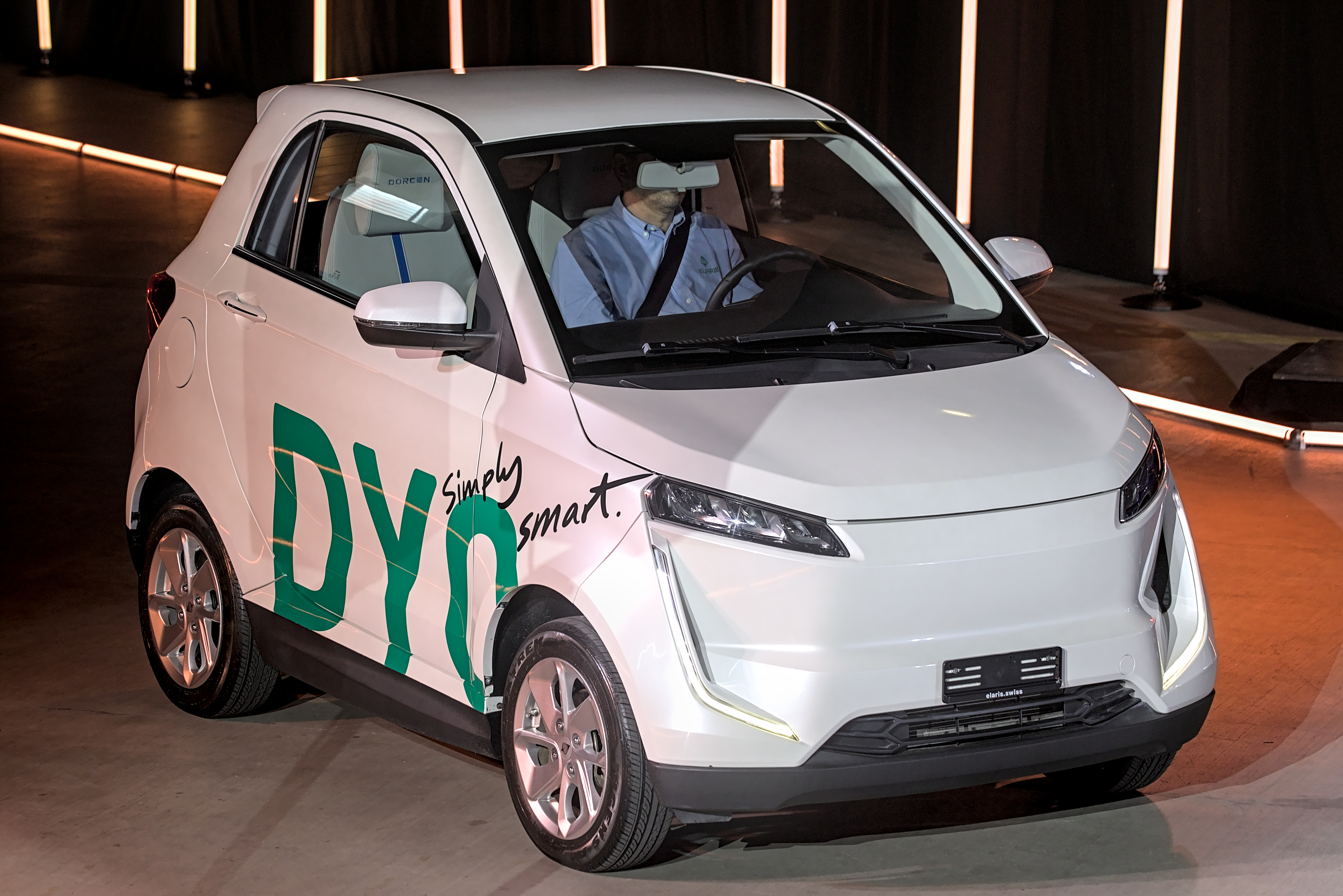
Elaris Dyo (facelift, Germany)

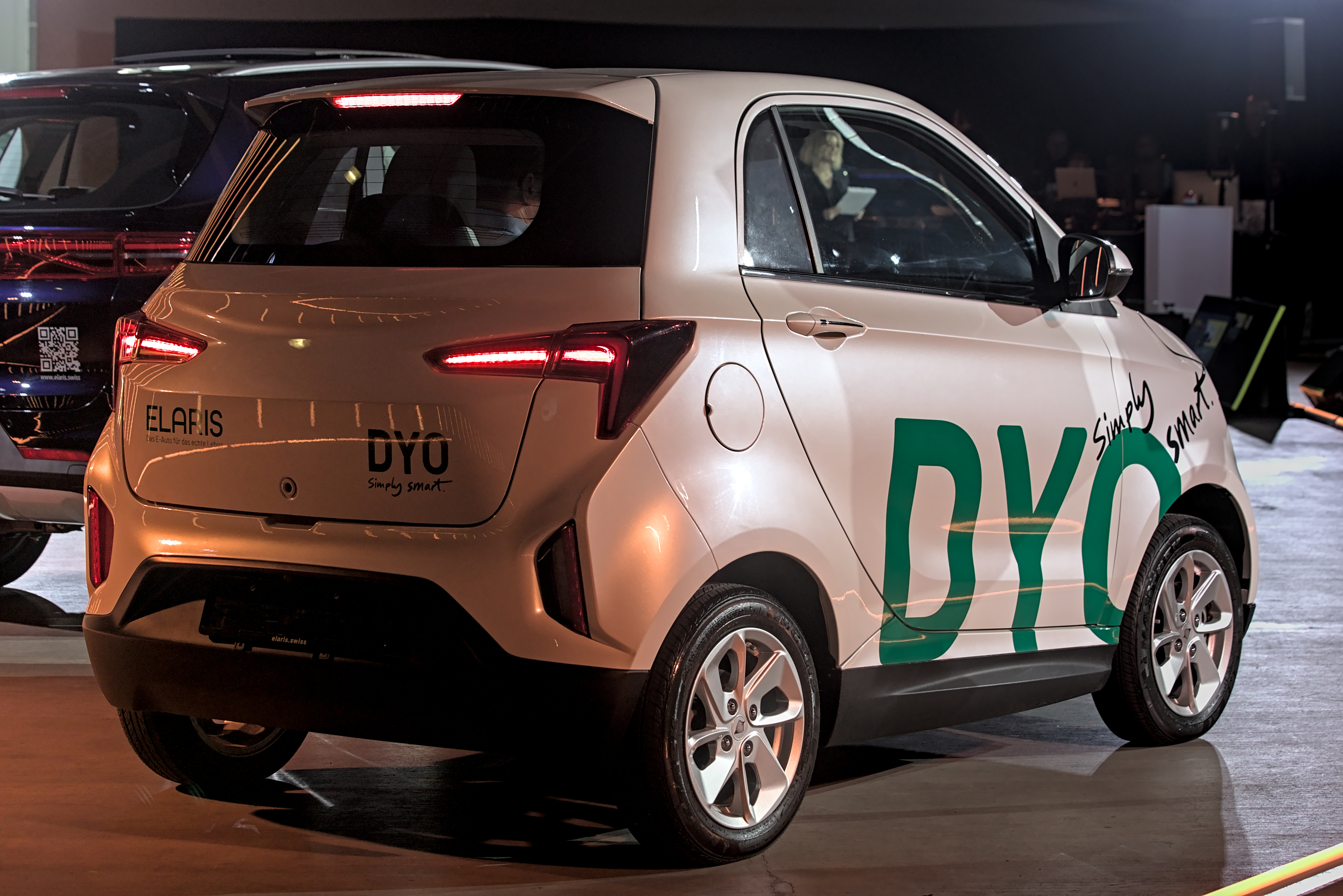
Elaris Dyo (facelift, Germany) rear
