= Aion LX =

Battery electric mid-size crossover SUV

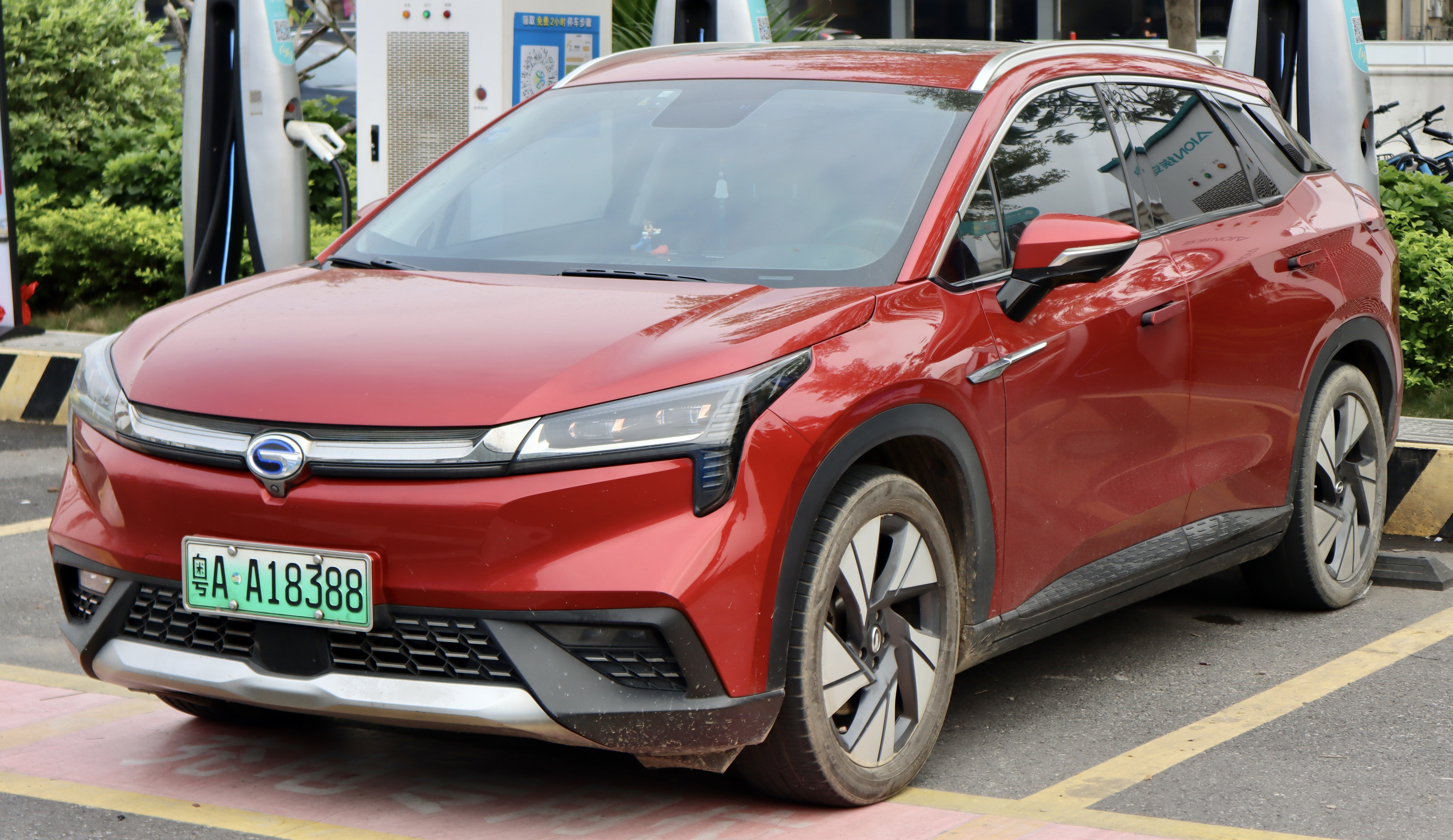
- Aion LX

Overview
- Manufacturer: GAC Aion
- Also called: Hycan 007
- Production: 2019–2026
- Assembly: Guangzhou, China

Body and chassis
- Class: Mid-size crossover SUV (D)
- Body style: 5-door SUV
- Layout: Front-motor, FWD; Dual-motor, AWD

Powertrain
- Electric motor: Permanent-magnet synchronous
- Power output: 135–300 kW (181–402 hp; 184–408 PS)
- Transmission: 1-speed direct drive
- Battery: 70 kWh NMC CATL; 93 kWh NMC CATL; 144.4 kWh NMC
- Electric range: 503–1,008 km (313–626 mi) (NEDC)

Dimensions
- Wheelbase: 2,920 mm (115.0 in)
- Length: 4,786 mm (188.4 in); 4,835 mm (190.4 in) (LX Plus)
- Width: 1,935 mm (76.2 in)
- Height: 1,685 mm (66.3 in)
- Curb weight: 2,040–2,180 kg (4,497–4,806 lb)

The Aion LX is a mid-size electric SUV produced by GAC Aion. It was revealed at Auto Shanghai in April 2019.

== History ==
The Aion LX was unveiled at Auto Shanghai in April 2019. The LX started pre-sale in August 2019 and production in October 2019.

It is the second vehicle sold under the GAC New Energy Aion sub-brand after the Aion S.

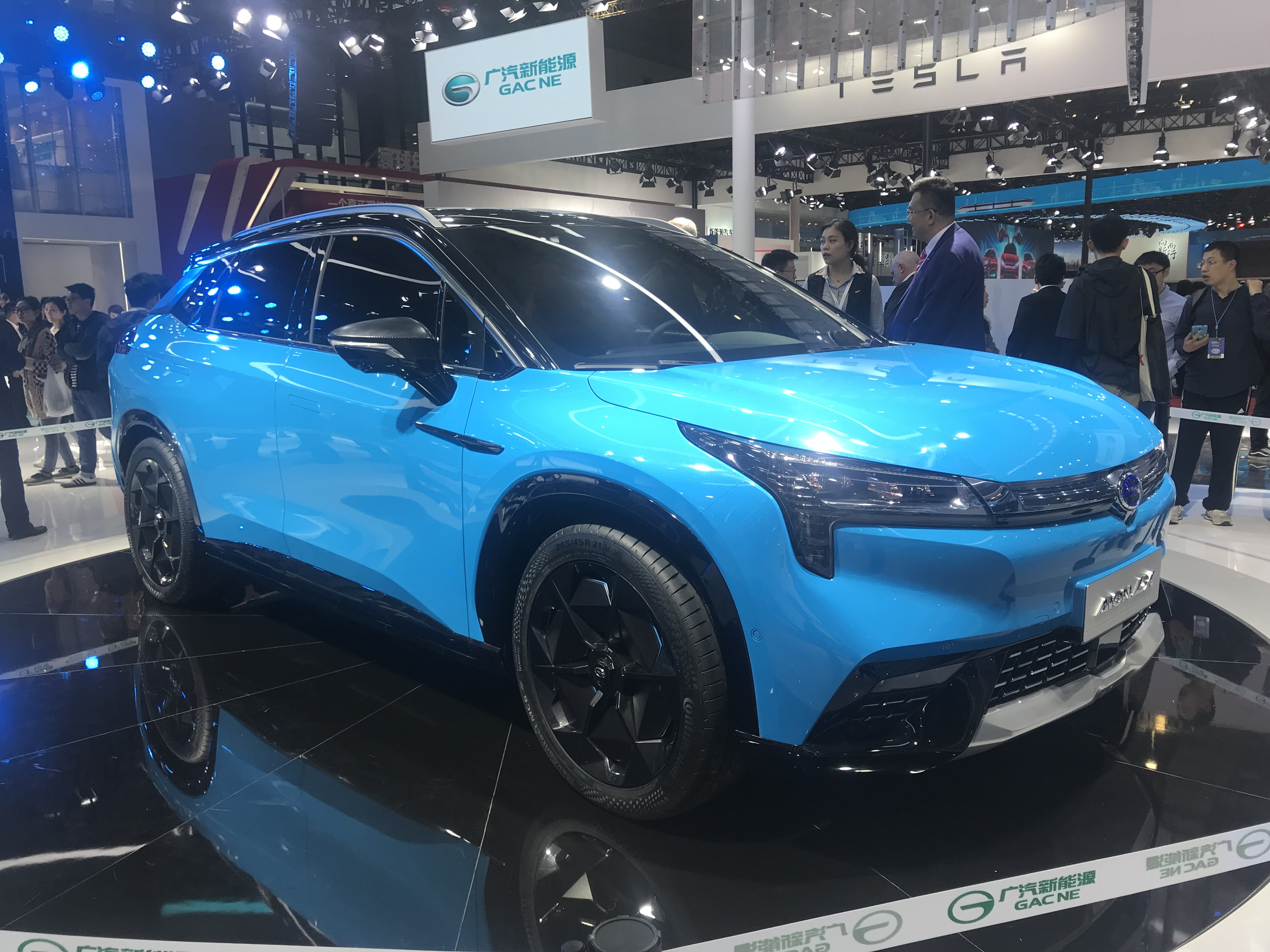
Aion LX (right side, front)

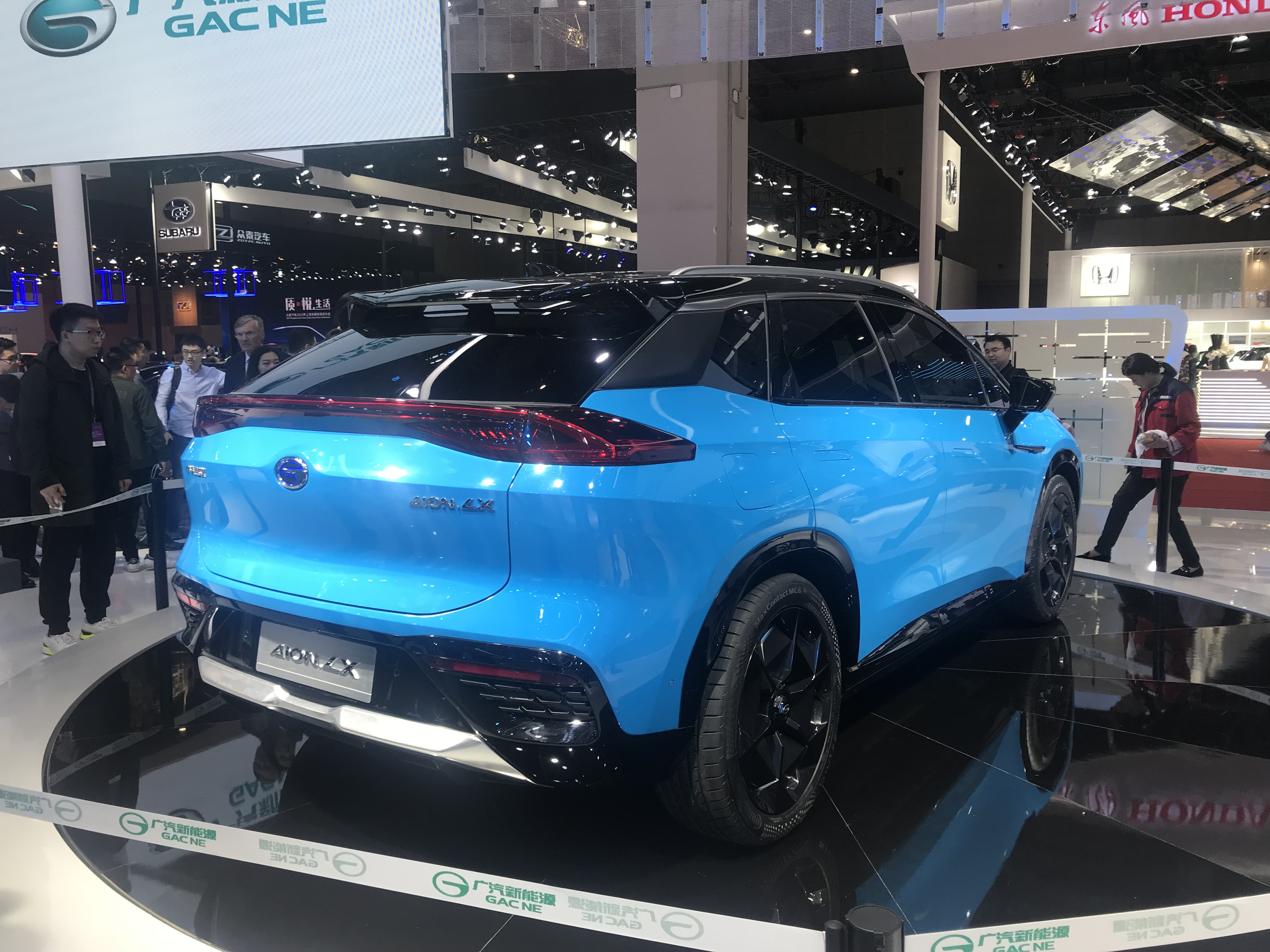
Aion LX (rear)

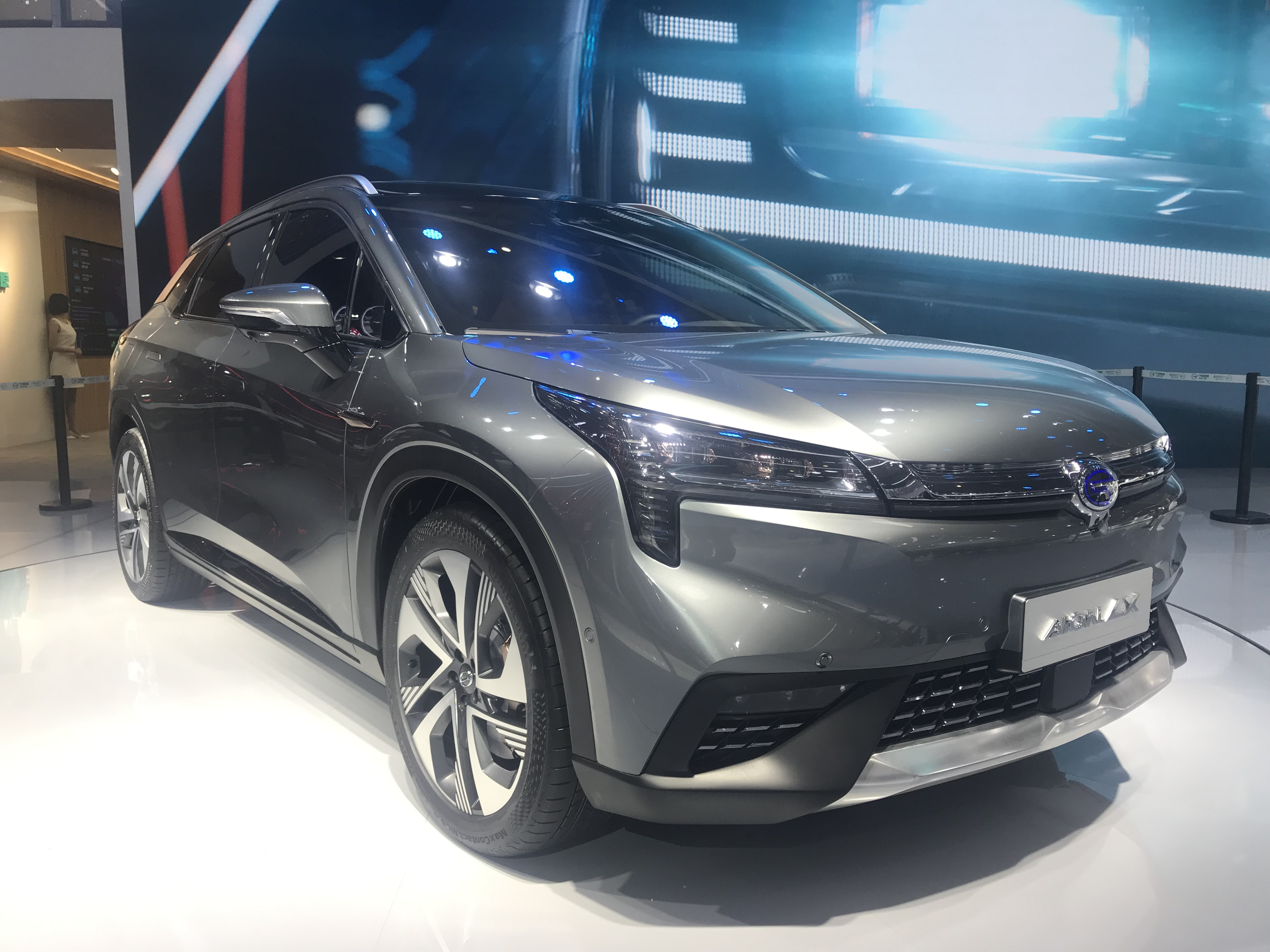
Aion LX (front)

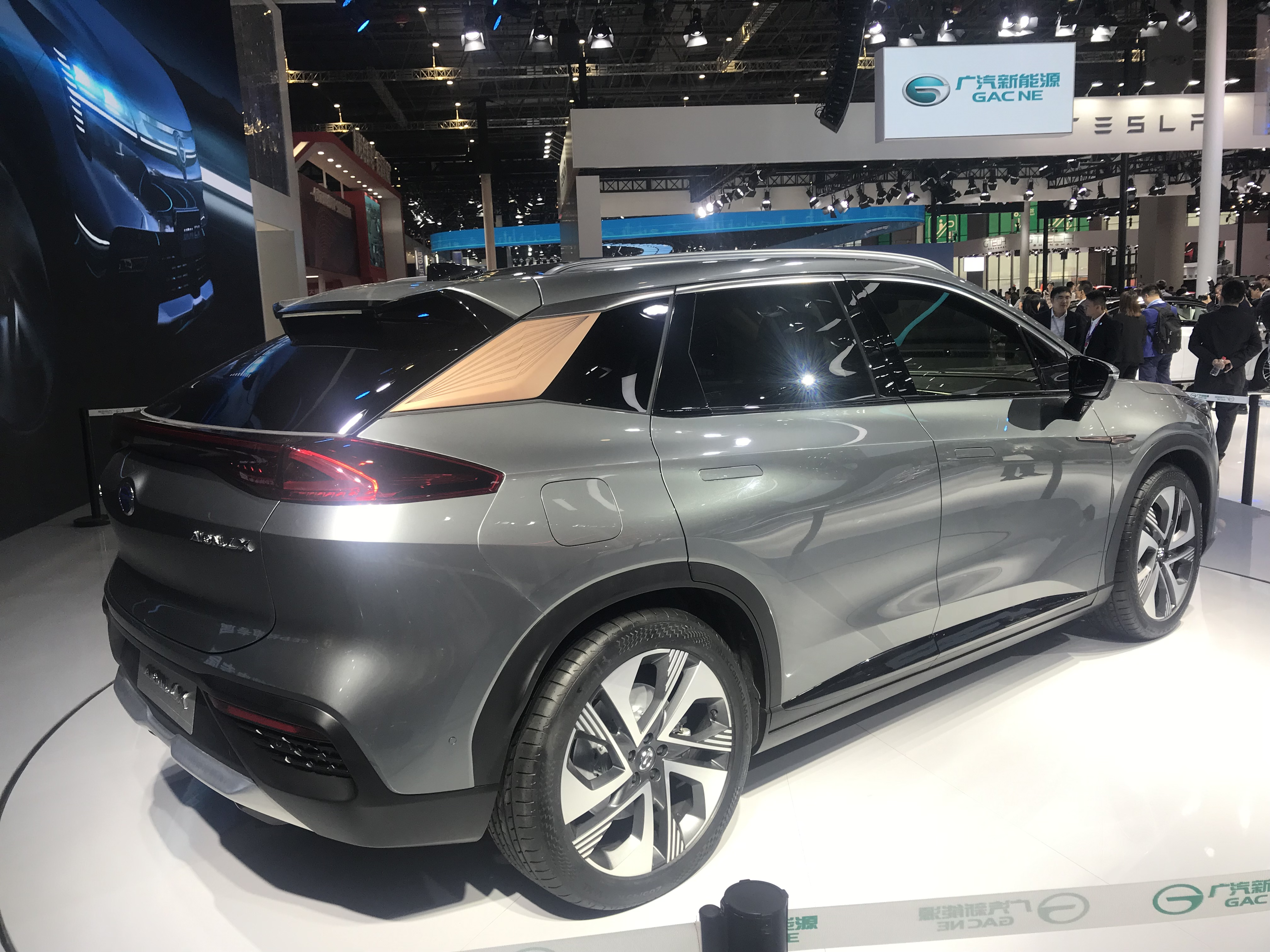
Aion LX (right side, rear)

=== Aion LX Fuel Cell ===
On 28 July 2020 at the GAC Tech Day event, GAC presented a fuel cell version of the Aion LX with a different grille from that of the electric version for hydrogen technology testing purposes. The Aion LX Fuel Cell has a fueling time of 3–5 minutes and a NEDC range exceeding 650 kilometres (400 mi).

=== Aion LX Plus ===
Unveiled in November 2021, the Aion LX Plus is an updated variant of the all-electric Aion LX which is slightly longer, features a different styling (taking design cues from the smaller Aion V Plus) and is equipped with a 144.4 kWh battery capable of 1,008 km (626 mi) of range on the NEDC cycle. The battery uses silicon sponge technology in its anode.

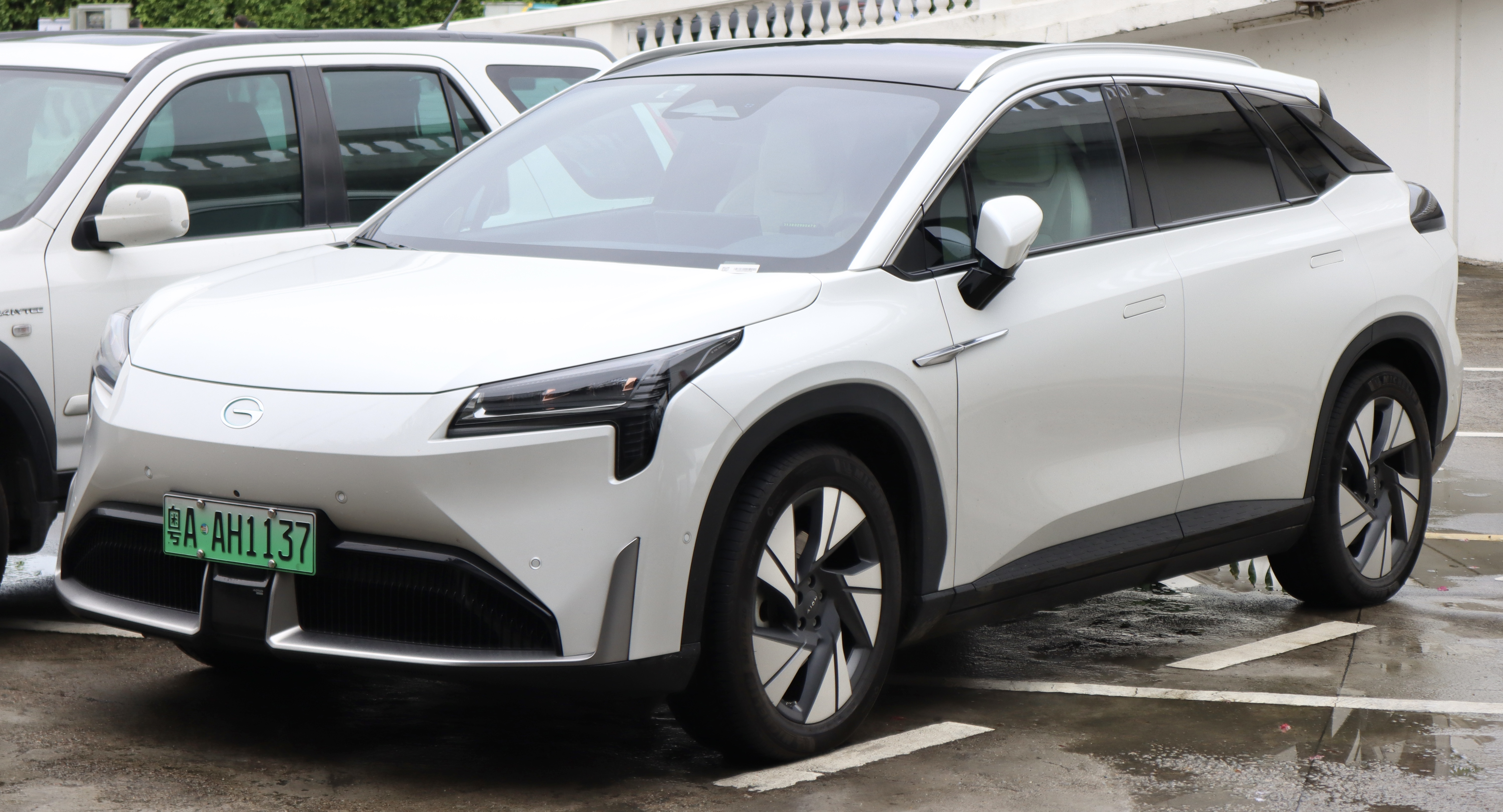
Aion LX Plus (front)

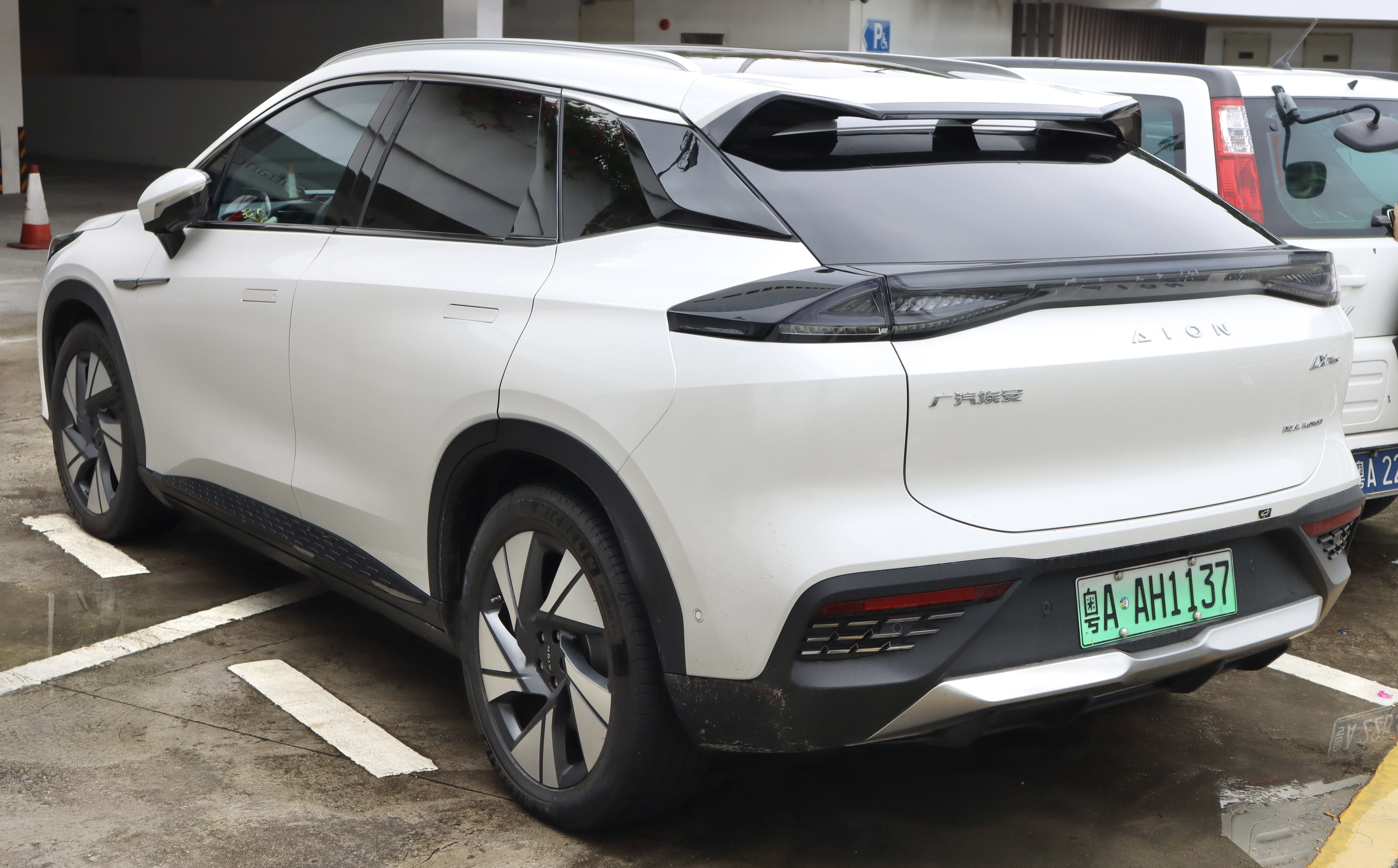
Aion LX Plus (rear)

=== Specifications ===
Aion LX model specifications
Model	LX 60	LX 70	LX 80	LX 80D	LX 80D Max
Battery	70 kWh (NCM523)		93 kWh (NCM811)		
Weight	1,900 kg (4,190 lb)	1,900 kg (4,190 lb)	2,040 kg (4,500 lb)	2,180 kg (4,810 lb)	
Range (NEDC)	503 km (313 mi)	520 km (323 mi)	650 km (404 mi)	600 km (373 mi)	
Energy consumption (kWh/100 km)	15.7	15.5	15.8	17.1	
Max. power	135 kW (181 hp; 184 PS)		150 kW (201 hp; 204 PS)	300 kW (402 hp; 408 PS)	
Max. torque	350 N⋅m (258 lb⋅ft)			700 N⋅m (516 lb⋅ft)	
Layout	FWD			AWD	
Sales price	CN¥249,600	CN¥259,600	CN¥279,600	CN¥299,600	CN¥349,600

==== Features ====
The Aion LX's roof has solar panels that are used to heat and cool the interior. Unmanned parking and level 4 autonomous driving is also featured in the LX. Front passenger seat can be automatically moved forwards from the rear control panel similar to Mercedes S-Class. The rear seats have fold out leg supports.

==== Exterior ====
The Aion LX's exterior uses the same design cues as the Aion S and V, with the same front and headlight design and rear taillight bar. Gloss black aerodynamic wheel covers, carbon wing mirrors and carbon C-pillar can be optioned.

== Hycan 007 ==
In April 2019, GAC and Nio announced they would form a joint venture electric vehicle brand called Hycan. On 20 May 2019, Hycan revealed the 007 concept, which is an Aion LX with a redesigned front and rear end, interior, and wheel design.

On 27 December 2019, the largely unchanged production Hycan 007 was revealed and went on pre-sale before being officially listed for sale in the Chinese market in April 2020 at a starting price of 262,000 Chinese yuan (US$37,343).

The 007 is available in three trim levels, Base, Plus, and Top. The Base trim level has a 73 kWh (260 MJ) battery pack with a NEDC range of 523 km (325 mi) and a 0–100 km/h (0–62 mph) acceleration time of 8.2 seconds, while the higher-level Plus and Top trims both have a 93 kWh (330 MJ) battery with a NEDC range of up to 643 km (400 mi) and a 0–100 km/h (0–62 mph) acceleration time of 7.9 seconds. The top version has 26 miles (42 km) more range than the LX's top trim level, which only has a range of 373 miles (600 km).

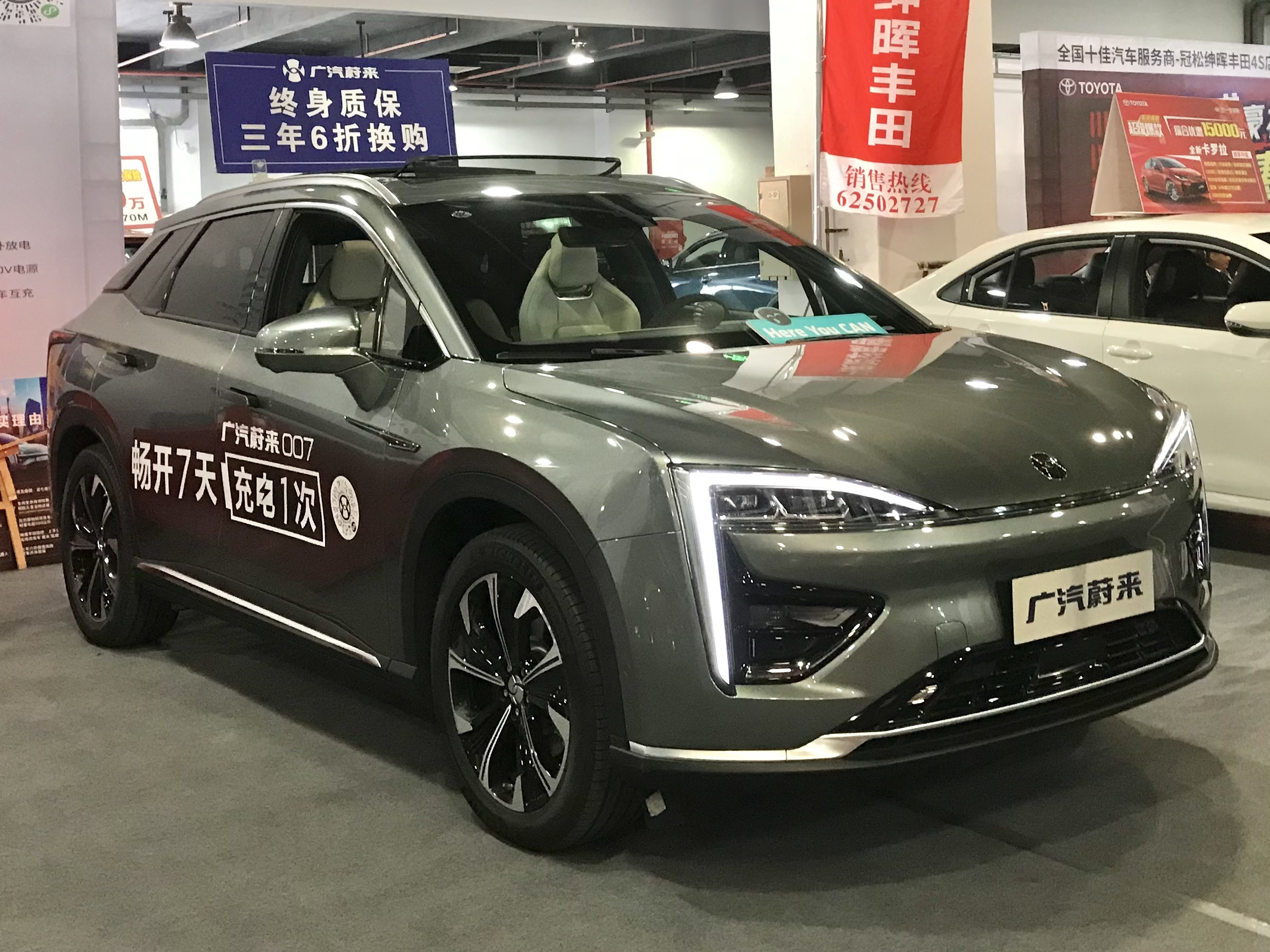
Hycan 007 (front)

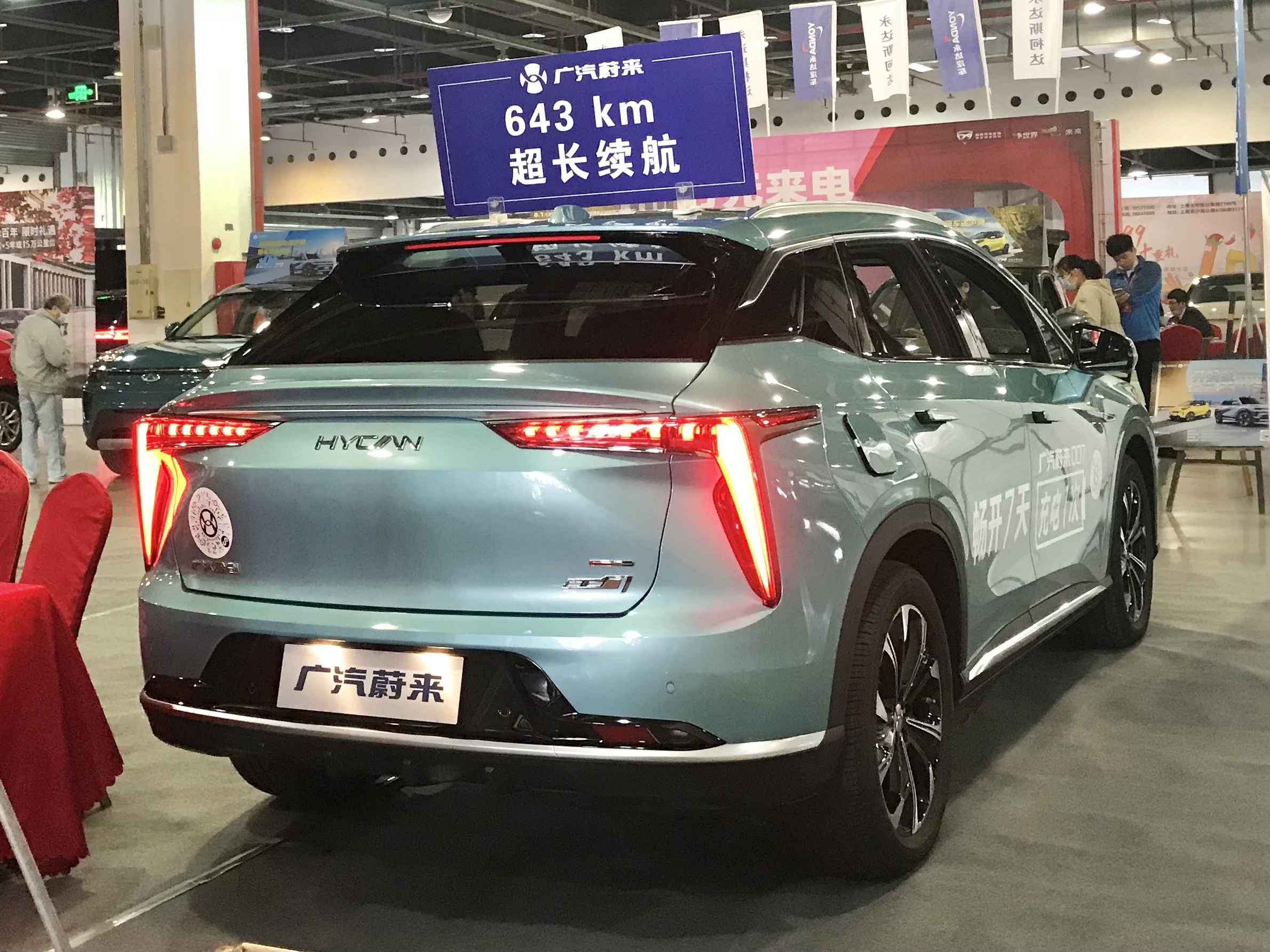
Hycan 007 (rear)

== Sales ==
Sales of the Aion LX started in October 2019.

Aion LX
Calendar year	Sales
2019	1,341
2020	2,744
2021	1,003
2022	3,990
2024	432
2025	273

Hycan 007
Year	China
2021	306
2022	102
2023	26
2024	11
2025	45

== See also ==
- Aion S, a compact executive electric sedan by Aion
- List of GAC vehicles
