= Hycan =

Chinese electric vehicle company

Hycan Automobile Technology Co., Ltd
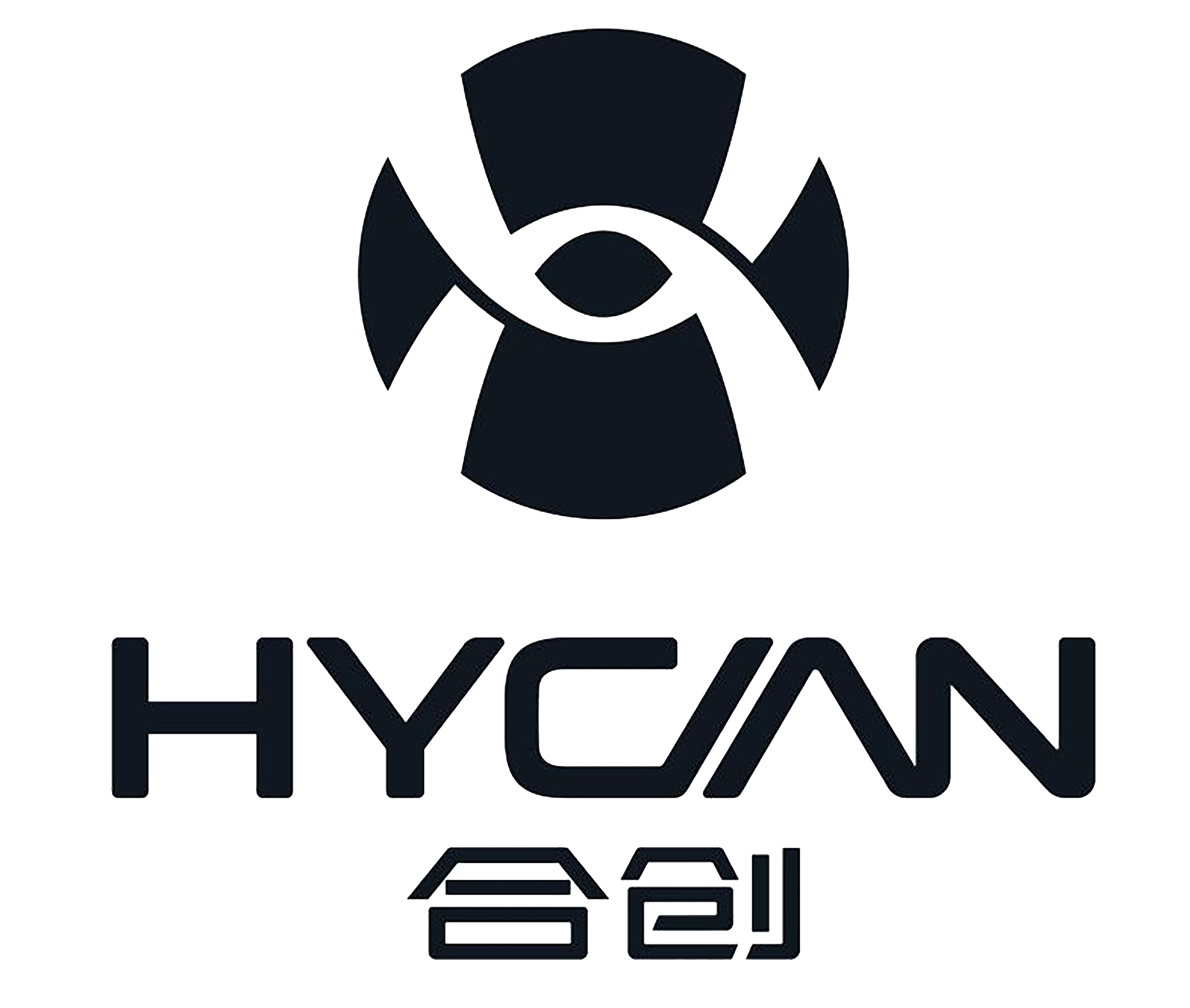
- Native name: 合创汽车科技有限公司
- Formerly: GAC-NIO New Energy Technology Co., Ltd.
- Company type: Automotive joint venture
- Industry: Automotive
- Founded: 2019; 7 years ago
- Founder: Zhang Fangyou
- Defunct: 2025
- Headquarters: Guangzhou, China
- Area served: China; Israel; Philippines
- Key people: Yin Yang (CEO)
- Products: Electric automobiles
- Production output: ▲2,856 vehicles (2023)
- Owner: Pearl River Investment (68.56%); GAC Aion (20.54%); GAC Group (4.46%)
- Website: www.hycan.com.cn

Hycan Automobile Technology (Chinese: 合创汽车科技有限公司) is a defunct Chinese electric vehicle manufacturer headquartered in Guangzhou, China.

== History ==
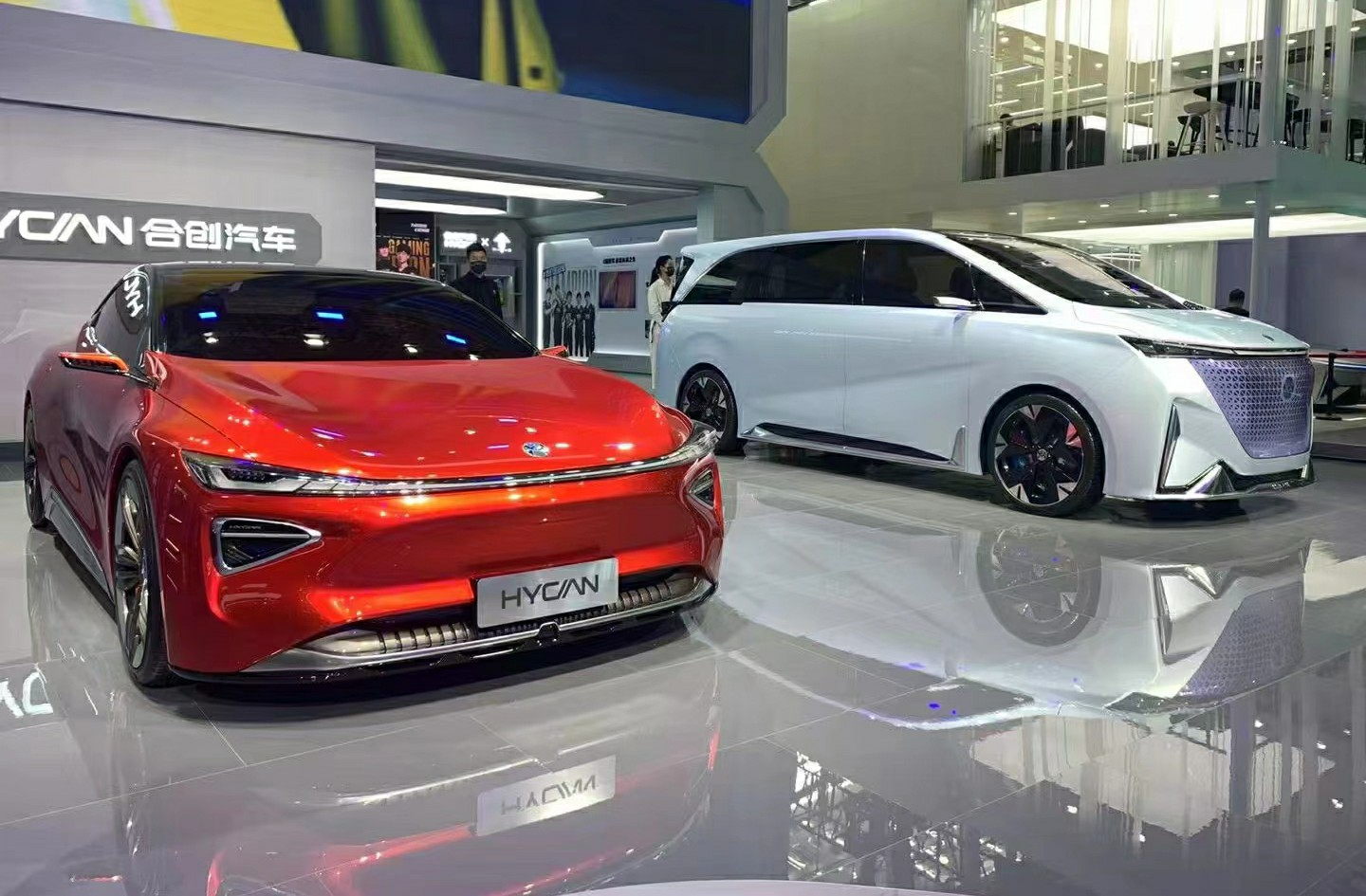
Hycan's concept vehicles: Concept-S and Concept-M

On 10 April 2018, GAC Group, GAC New Energy Technology (now GAC Aion) and Nio Inc. established a joint venture called GAC-Nio New Energy Technology Co., Ltd., and almost a year later, on 1 April 2019, GAC and Nio announced the upcoming revealing of a new brand Hycan and electric SUV under this joint venture.

In early 2021, Guangdong Pearl River Investment Management Group has become GAC-Nio's largest shareholder, while Nio's stake in Hycan was diluted to 4.5%. Later that year, GAC-Nio changed its name to Hycan. In 2022, Nio withdrew as a shareholder of Hycan.

On January 11, 2025, GAC Group disclosed that as the shareholder, it is solving the employee placement issue of Hycan in accordance with its investment ratio. GAC Aion will take over the after-sales service of Hycan products. Hycan has been confirmed as substantially defunct.

== Models ==
=== Hycan 007 ===
The Hycan 007 is a mid-size electric sport utility vehicle produced since April 2020.

On 20 May 2019, Hycan revealed the 007 concept, an Aion LX (produced by GAC New Energy) with a redesigned front and rear end, interior, and wheel design. The production model was yet to be revealed and multiple teasers were shown before the upcoming revealing.

On 27 December 2019, the largely unchanged production Hycan 007 was revealed and went on pre-sale before being officially listed for sale in the Chinese market in April 2020 at a starting price of 262,000 Chinese yuan (US$37,343).

The 007 is available in three trim levels, Base, Plus, and Top. The Base trim level has a 73 kWh (260 MJ) battery pack with a NEDC range of 523 km (325 mi) and a 0–100 km/h acceleration time of 8.2 seconds, while the higher-level Plus and Top trims both have a 93 kWh (330 MJ) battery with a NEDC range of up to 643 km (400 mi) and a 0–100 km/h acceleration time of 7.9 seconds.

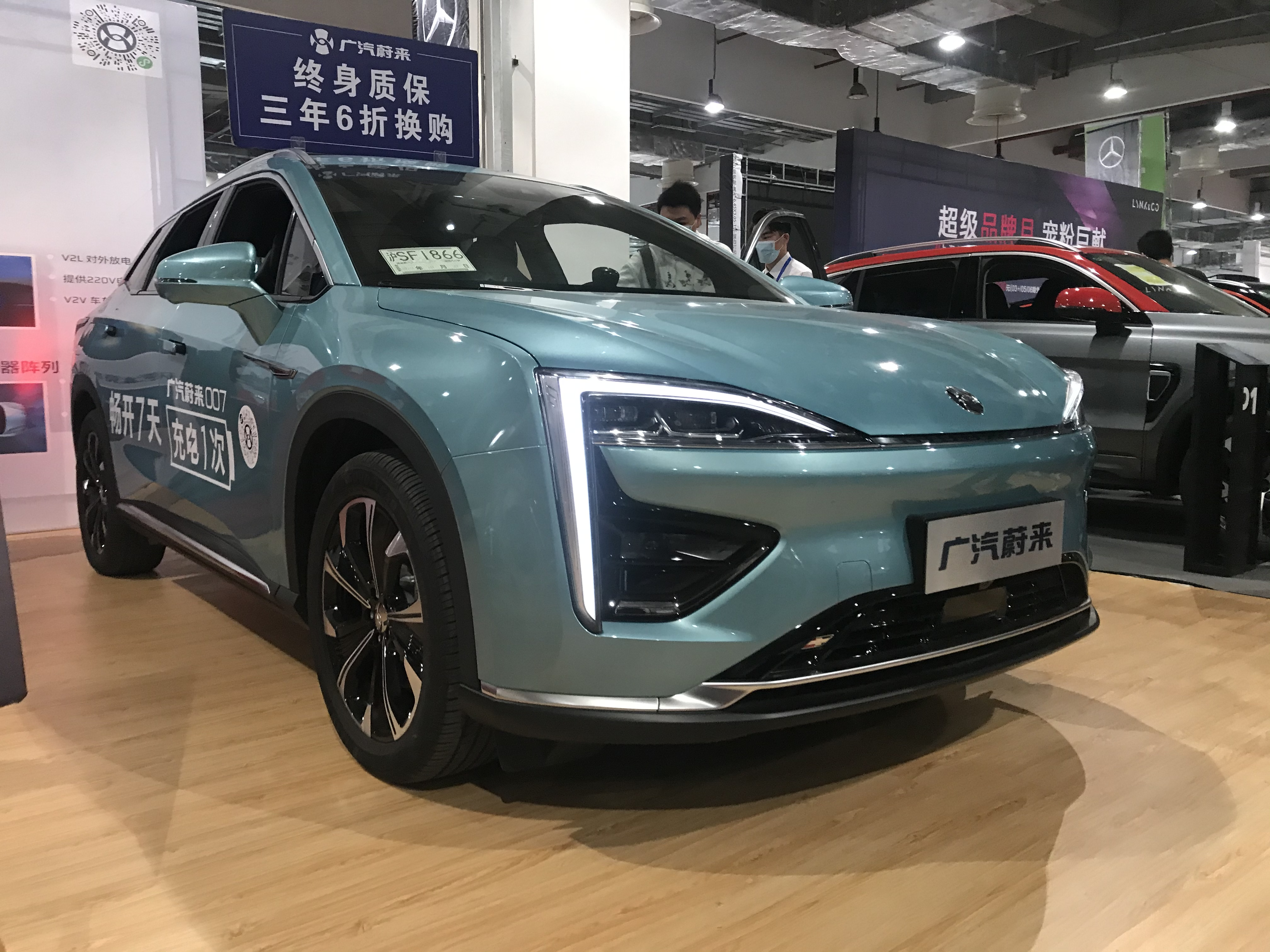
Hycan 007 front

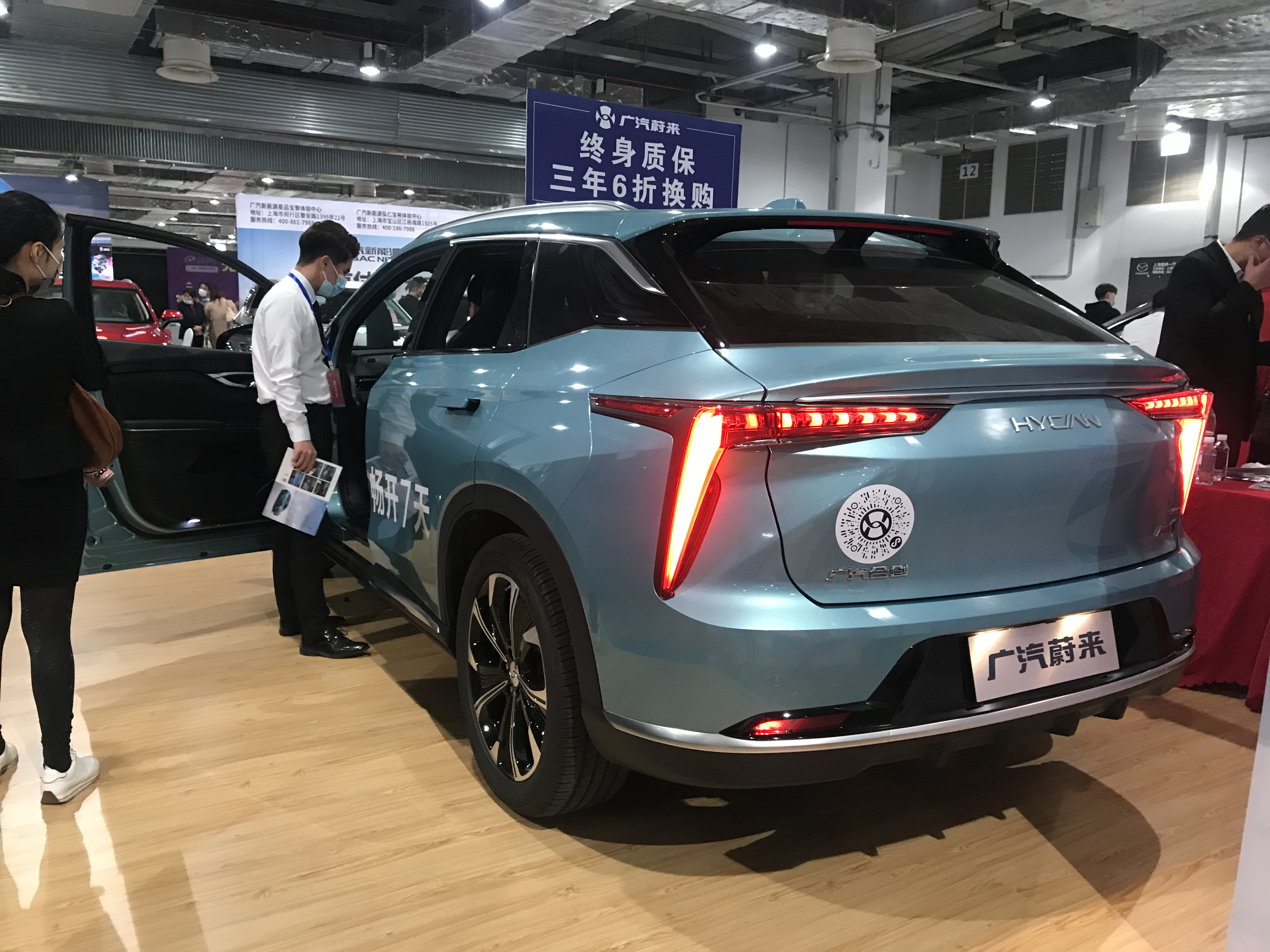
Hycan 007 rear

=== Hycan Z03 ===
The Hycan Z03 is a subcompact electric crossover sport utility vehicle produced in China since April 2021. It is an Aion Y with a redesigned front and rear end, interior, and wheel design.

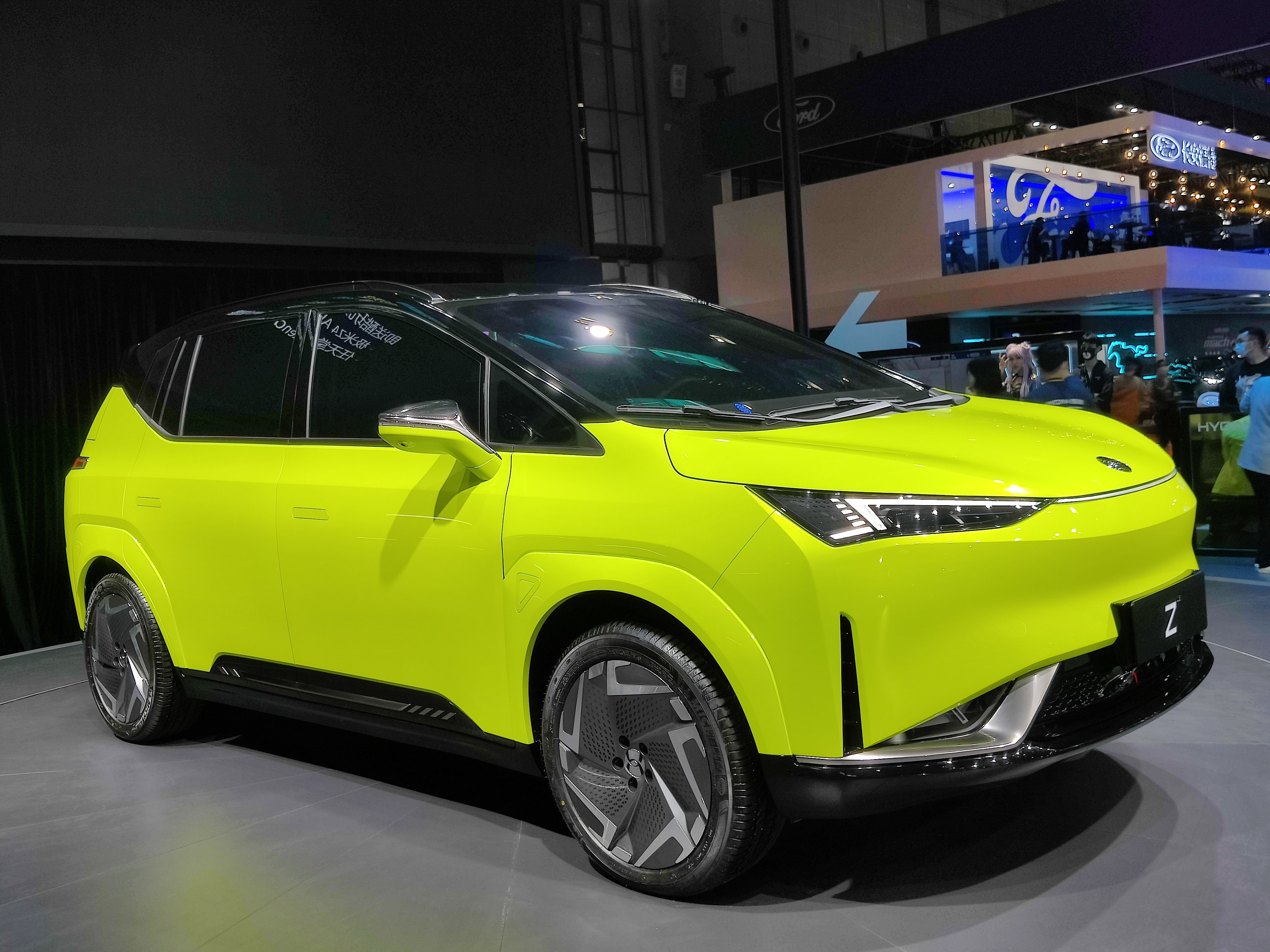
Hycan Z03 front

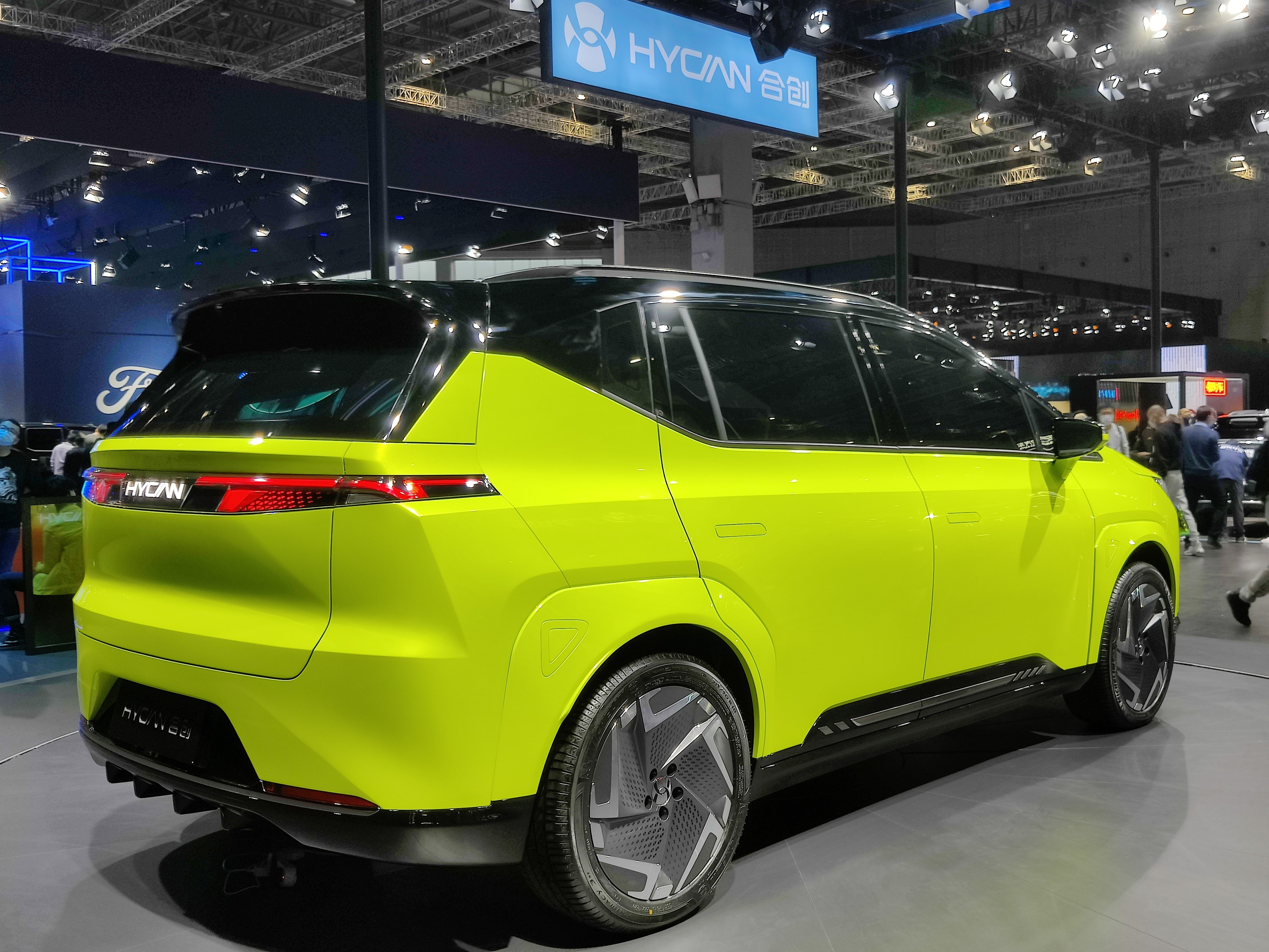
Hycan Z03 rear

=== Hycan A06 ===
The Hycan A06 is a mid-size electric sedan launched in 2022.

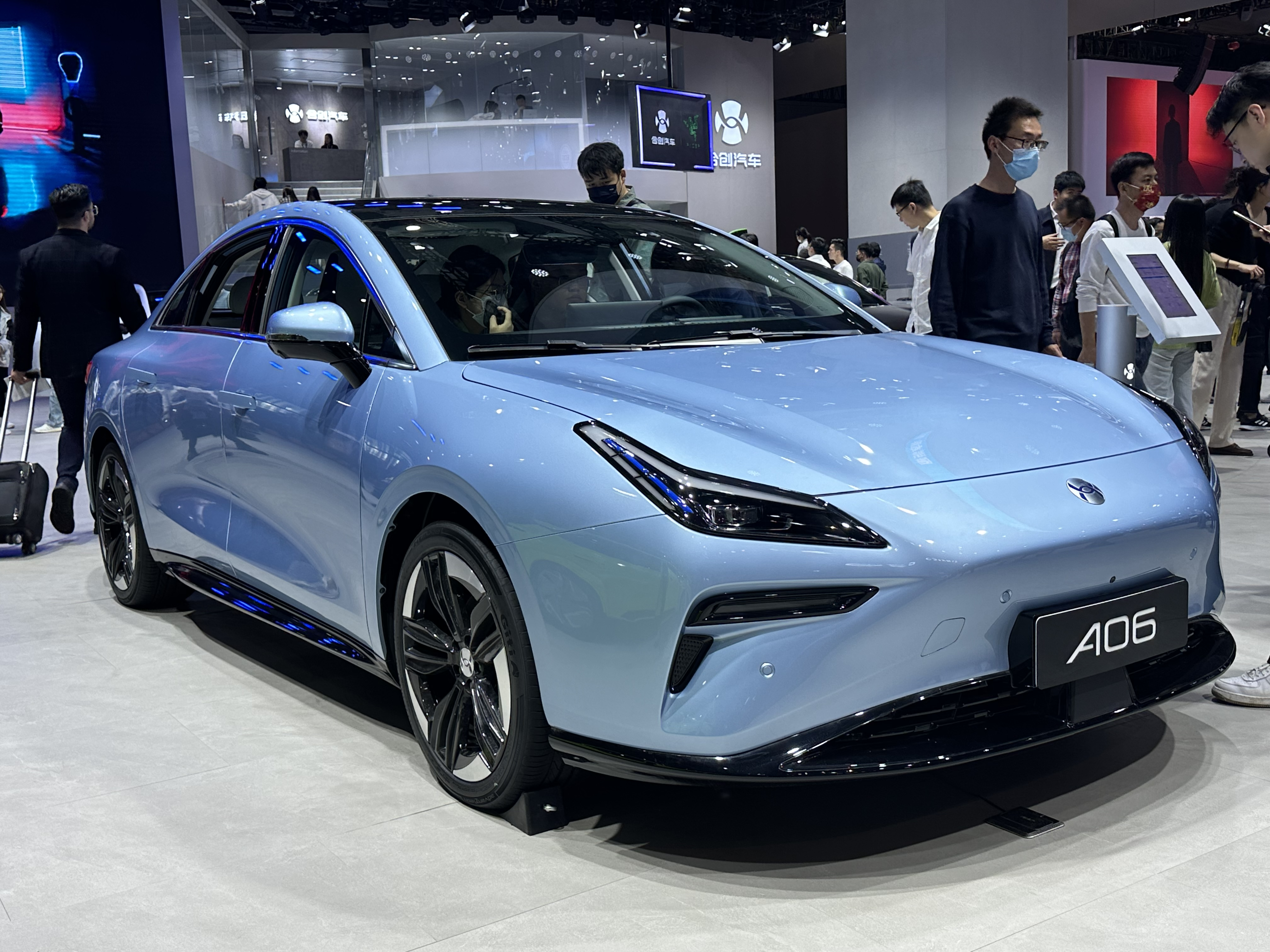
Hycan A06 front

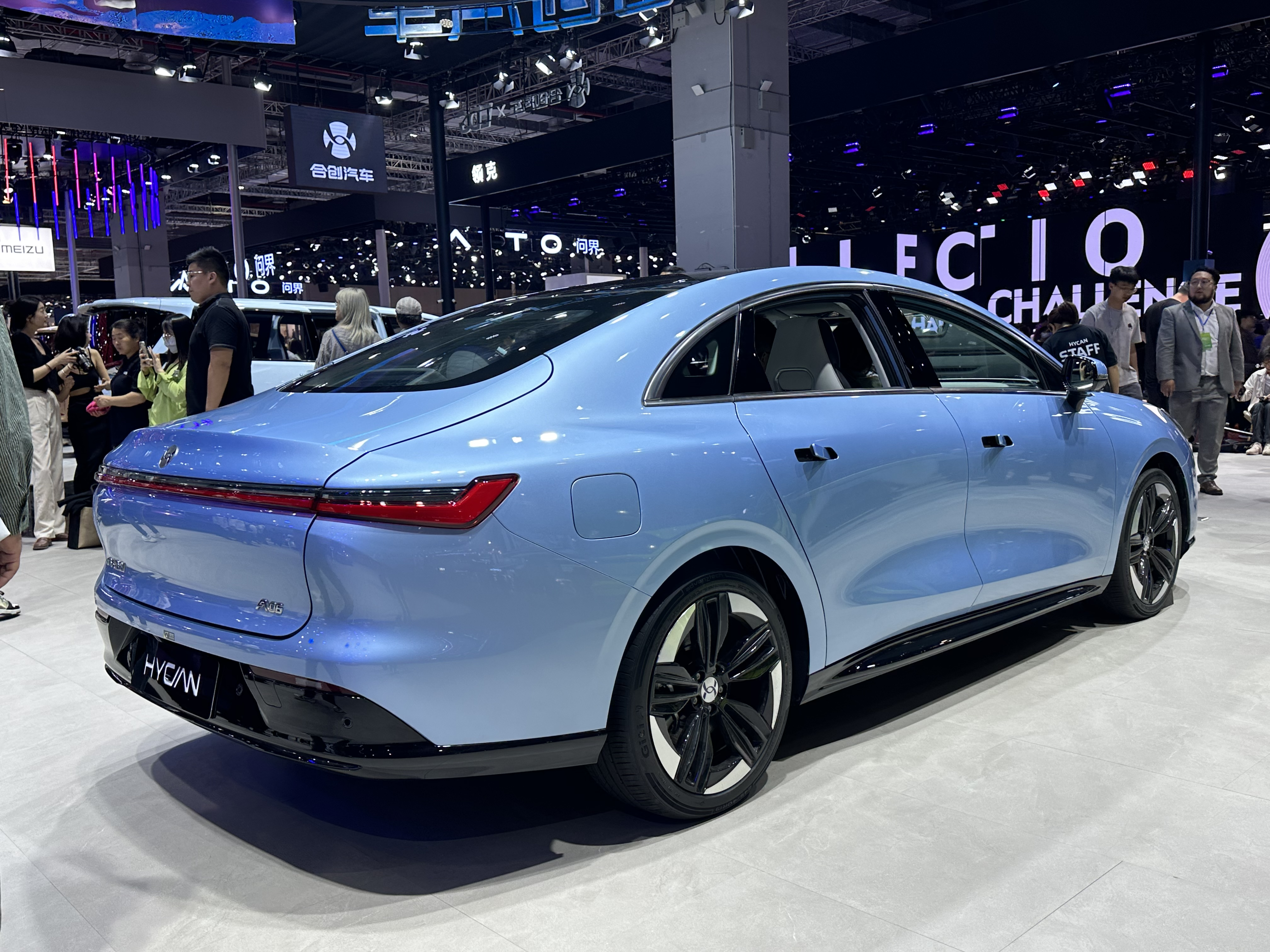
Hycan A06 rear

=== Hycan V09 ===
The Hycan V09 is an electric MPV launched in 2023.

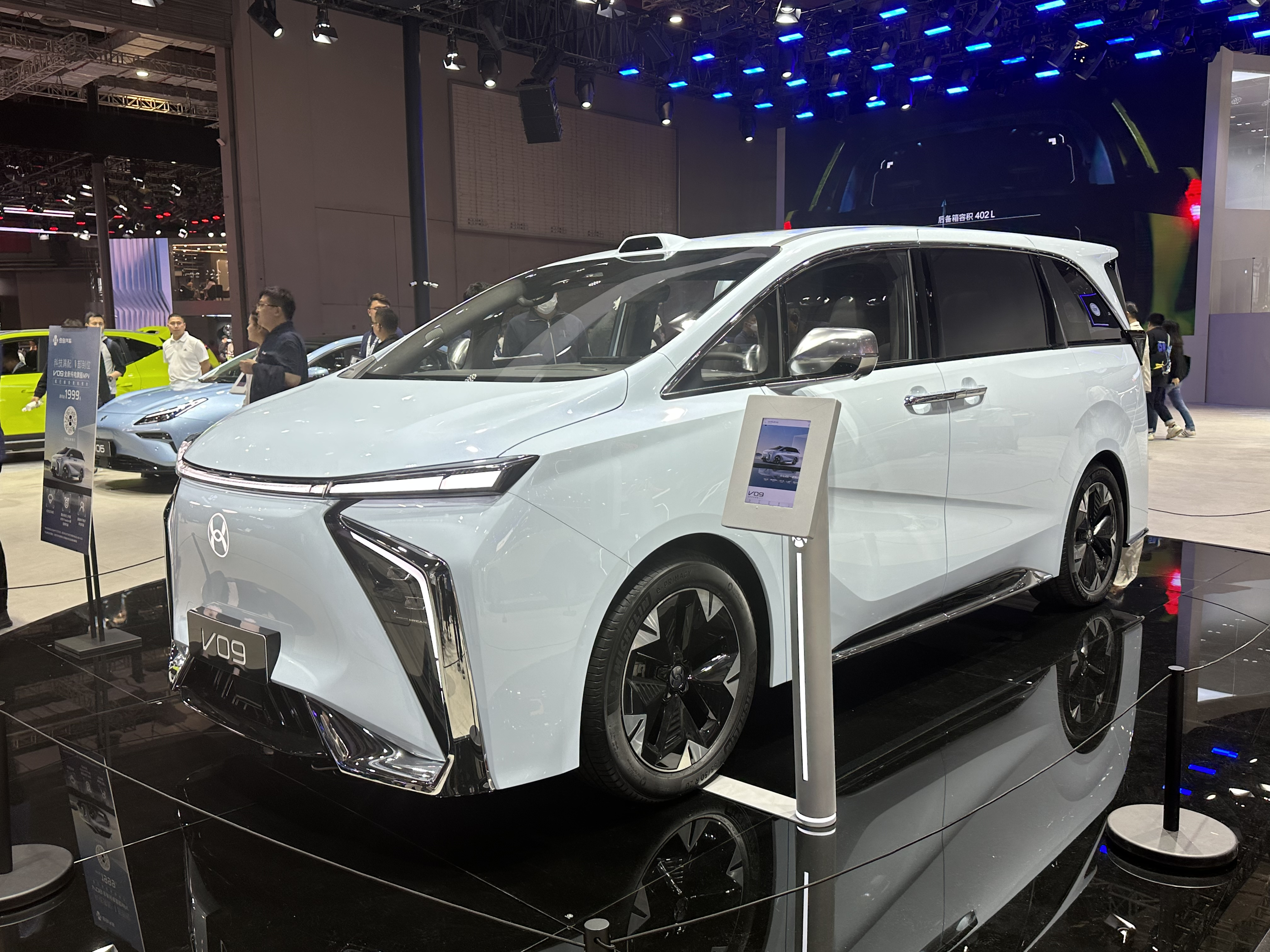
Hycan V09 front

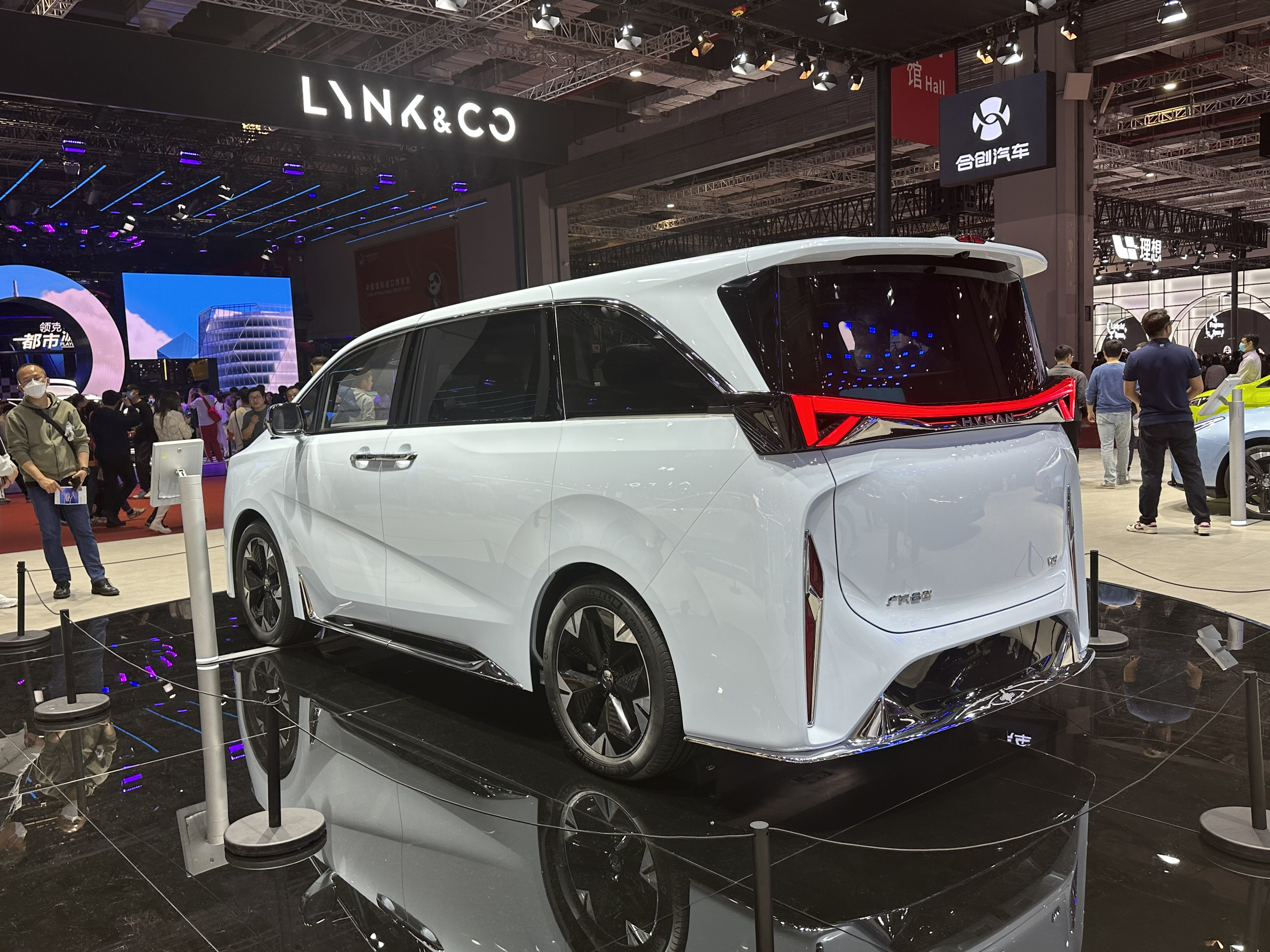
Hycan V09 rear

== Technologies ==
=== 'Little Can' AI ===
Hycan vehicles feature a smart assistant similar to Nio's Nomi smart assistant. The assistant, named 'Little Can' (in Chinese, 小CAN, pronounced Xiǎo Cān), can pull up the car's navigation, control the music, adjust the cabin temperature, open or close windows, and take a selfie of the passengers in the cabin.

== Sales ==
Hycan sales data
Year	Sales
2020	659
2021	2,907
2022	19,621
2023	15,980
