= A10 =

A10, A.10 or A-10 most often refers to:

- Fairchild Republic A-10 Thunderbolt II, a U.S. close ground support attack aircraft
- Atlantic 10 Conference

A10, A.10 or A-10 may also refer to:

== Roads and routes ==
- List of A10 roads
- Bundesautobahn 10, also called Berliner Ring
- Route A10, a London bus route

== Science and technology ==
=== Computing ===
- A10 chipset, mainly used in Android tablet computers
- AMD A10, an accelerated processing unit from AMD
- Apple A10, a 64-bit system on a chip
- A10 Networks, U.S. computer network company
- Samsung Galaxy A10, smartphone released in 2019
- Sony NW-A10, a Walkman digital audio player released in 2014

=== Vehicles ===
==== Automobiles ====
- Arrows A10, a 1987 British racing car
- Ascari A10, a British car
- Leapmotor A10, a Chinese battery electric subcompact crossover SUV

==== Aircraft ====
- Fairchild Republic A-10 Thunderbolt II, a U.S. close ground support attack aircraft
- Aero A.10, a Czech biplane airliner
- AmeriPlanes Mitchell Wing A-10, an ultralight aircraft
- Antares A-10 Solo, a Ukrainian ultralight trike design
- Breda A.10, a 1928 Italian single-seat fighter-trainer prototype
- Curtiss YA-10 Shrike, a 1932 American attack prototype
- Fiat A.10, a World War I Italian aero engine

==== Other vehicles ====
- A10 class (disambiguation), rail locomotives
- Aggregate 10, a German World War II rocket in the Aggregate rocket family
- Cruiser Mk II, also known by its General Staff designation "A10", a British cruiser tank of World War II
- HMS A10, a British A-class submarine

=== Other uses in science and technology ===
- British NVC community A10 (Polygonum amphibium community), a British Isles plant community
- HLA-A10, a broad antigen serogroup of the Human MHC HLA-A
- Homeobox A10, a human gene
- Subfamily A10, a Rhodopsin-like receptors subfamily
- Fiat A.10, a World War I Italian aero engine

== Sports and games ==
- A-10 Attack!, a combat flight simulator for the Apple Macintosh computer
- A-10 Cuba!, a flight simulator computer game
- A-10 Tank Killer, a flight simulation computer game for Amiga and DOS platforms
- A10 World Series, a proposed new global motorsport series
- English Opening, Encyclopaedia of Chess Openings code

== Other uses ==
- Atlantic 10 Conference
- A10 – new European architecture, an architecture magazine
- A10, an ISO 216 paper size
- A10, the 10 acceding countries of the 2004 enlargement of the European Union
- A10, the Metropolitan Police Service anti-corruption branch
- The UDDS (Urban Dynamometer Driving Schedule), known as the A10 in Sweden, used to test vehicle fuel economy and emissions
- 10th Artillery Regiment (Sweden), in the list of Swedish artillery regiments
