= Fighter Squadron: The Screamin' Demons Over Europe =

1999 video game

- Developer: Parsoft Interactive
- Publisher: Activision
- Platform: Microsoft Windows
- Release: 1999
- Genre: Flight simulator
- Modes: Single-player, Multiplayer

Fighter Squadron: The Screamin' Demons over Europe (SDOE) is a World War II themed combat flight simulator released for Windows 95/98 in March 1999. The game was developed by Parsoft Interactive and released by Activision, following their successful partnership on A-10 Cuba! of 1996. The game featured nine flyable aircraft and three theatres with multiple missions for each combination, as well as network play with up to sixteen players.

The game was originally scheduled to ship in 1998, a year that also saw the release of Jane's WWII Fighters and the very successful European Air War. The game was delayed several times, missing the release of these two games, and then the critical Christmas season. When it was released in early 1999 it sold poorly, in spite of some good reviews. Activision stopped working with Parsoft, and the company folded soon after.

== Development ==
=== Previous efforts ===
Parsoft's first flight simulator was 1991's Hellcats Over the Pacific, arguably one of the most advanced flight simulators of the era. The game ran with high frame rates at any resolution the computer supported, and had a "busy" map with aircraft, ships, vehicles, and complex missions. One of the few common complaints was a fairly simplistic flight model. Behind the scenes, the game engine used hard-coded instructions for game maps, mission details, and vehicle models and behaviours, making it difficult to modify for new missions. In spite of this, the company released a mission pack, Leyte Gulf, in 1992. The game was very well reviewed, with Computer Gaming World simply calling it "outstanding". A mission pack, Hellcats: Missions at Leyte Gulf, was subsequently released.

After Leyte, Parsoft began work on an entirely new simulation engine, combining Hellcats' incremental rendering engine with a new flight model and solid-body modelling system, as well as a unified battlefield system known as VBE. While development was being finalized, the Macintosh platform was moving from the Motorola 680x0 family to the new PowerPC, and VBE ran poorly on these machines. Delays followed while a new version for the PowerPC was readied, and A-10 Attack! was finally released in 1995. It was widely lauded in the press, and awarded "Game of the Year". A mission pack, A-10 Cuba!, was released in 1996, which was also ported to Windows published by Activision as a stand-alone game. This was not as well received due to what were now outdated graphics support, although reviewers often described it as a diamond in the rough.

== Reception ==
Reviewers complained about the low-quality of the flight model, noting that earlier preview versions included a more accurate model. Parsoft blamed this on Activision demanding changes in light of user feedback. Some noted that the model suddenly switched to the original high-fidelity version when damage was taken.
