= Leapmotor B10 =

Compact crossover SUV

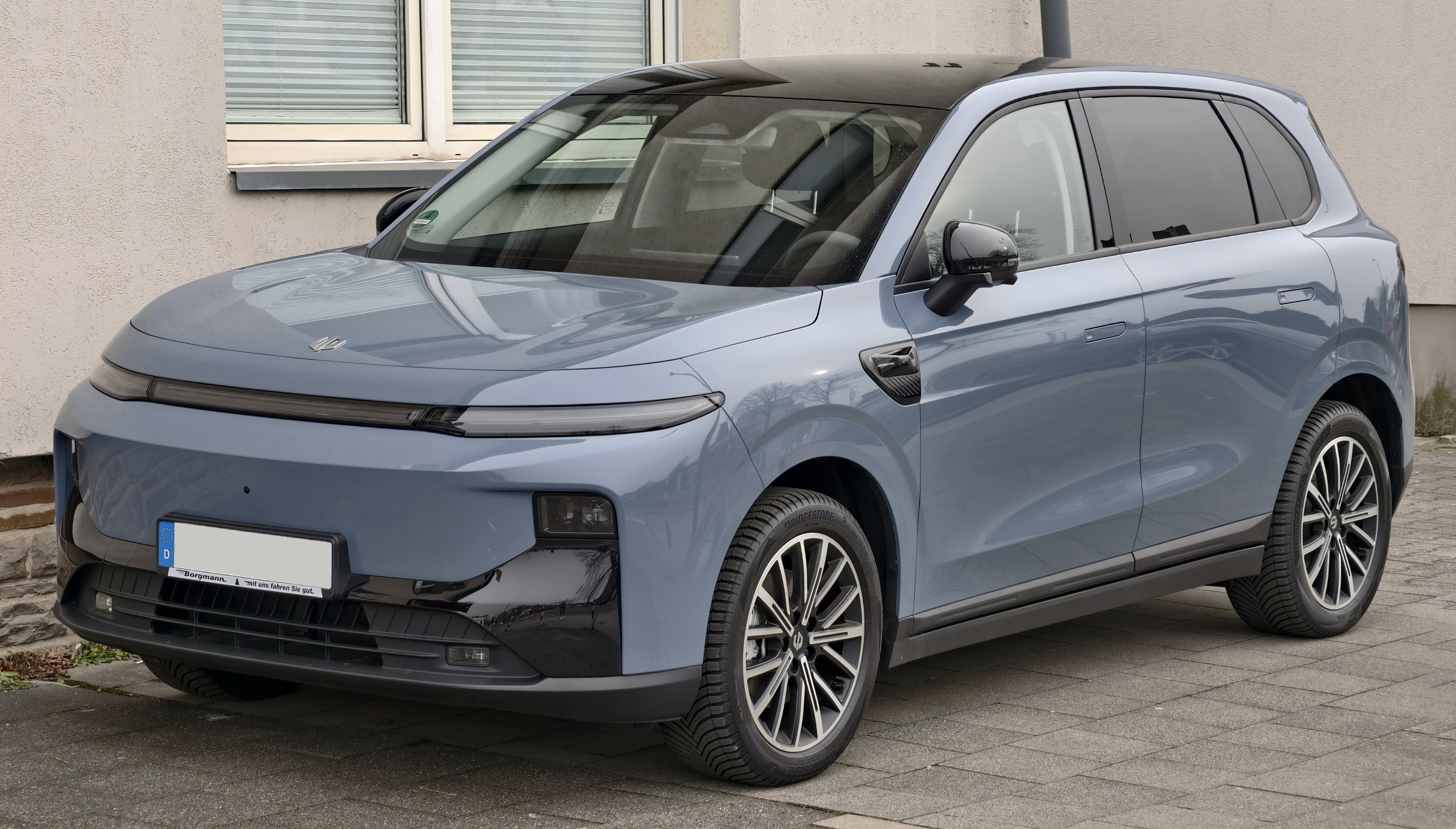

Overview
- Manufacturer: Leapmotor
- Production: 2025–present
- Assembly: China: Jinhua, Zhejiang; Spain: Zaragoza (Stellantis Zaragoza); Indonesia: Purwakarta (National Assemblers); Malaysia: Gurun, Kedah (Stellantis Gurun Plant)

Body and chassis
- Class: Compact crossover SUV
- Body style: 5-door SUV
- Layout: Rear-motor, rear-wheel drive
- Platform: LEAP 3.5
- Related: Hongqi E-HS4; Leapmotor A05 / B03; Leapmotor A10 / B03X; Leapmotor B01; Leapmotor Lafa 5 / B05

Powertrain
- Electric motor: Permanent magnet synchronous
- Power output: 132–180 kW (177–241 hp; 179–245 PS)
- Transmission: Single-speed gear reduction
- Battery: 56.2 kWh LFP Sunwoda/Zenergy; 60.8 kWh LFP CALB/Gotion; 67.1 kWh LFP Gotion/CALB; 69.7 kWh LFP Sunwoda/Gotion
- Electric range: 510–610 km (317–379 mi) (CLTC)

Dimensions
- Wheelbase: 2,735 mm (107.7 in)
- Length: 4,515 mm (177.8 in)
- Width: 1,885 mm (74.2 in)
- Height: 1,655 mm (65.2 in)
- Curb weight: 1,670–1,795 kg (3,682–3,957 lb)

The Leapmotor B10 (Chinese: 零跑B10; pinyin: Língpǎo B10) is a battery electric compact crossover SUV produced by Chinese automobile manufacturer Leapmotor since 2025. It is the first vehicle in the 'C' series model range and is the first to use the LEAP 3.5 platform.

The B10 debuted internationally at the 2024 Paris Motor Show in October. Then, it later debuted in China at Auto Guangzhou 2024 in November. Pre-sales of the model began on 10 March 2025, with deliveries beginning in China later that year on April 10. It later entered the European market in late 2025.

== Design and equipment ==
The exterior follows the 'Gravity Field' design language of other Leapmotor models, with a split headlight design and three-strip daytime running lights, pop-out door handles, 18-inch alloy wheels, and light bar style taillights.

The interior features an 8.8-inch digital gauge cluster display and a centrally mounted floating-style 14.6-inch 2.5K infotainment touchscreen using Leapmotor OS 4.0 Plus software, which supports Apple CarPlay and Huawei HiCar. The infotainment system on standard models is powered by a Qualcomm Snapdragon 8155 SoC, while higher end models use a Snapdragon 8295. The infotainment system has an AI-powered voice assistant, which uses the Deepseek and Tongyi Qianwen AI models.

It has power adjustable heated and ventilated front seats, 15W wireless charging pads on the center console, and a 60W USB-C power outlet. Rather than having a glovebox, the dashboard in front of the passenger seat has a relief shelf design with a series of holes on the top and bottom panels which supports accessories such as a desk table and mobile phone holders. It also has a 1.83 m^{2} (19.7 sq ft) fixed sunroof and 12-speaker audio system. The interior is available in either Bamboo Shadow Grey or Roman Purple synthetic leather upholstery with silver and copper metallic accents. It has a 420 L (14.8 cu ft) rear cargo area with a 95 L (3.4 cu ft) underfloor compartment, which expands to 1,415 L (50.0 cu ft) with the second row seats folded down.

The base trim level is a significantly lower spec compared to the second trim level, and features 18-inch steel wheels, reduced exterior lighting specifications, manually folding unheated mirrors, and a less powerful motor with slower acceleration. The interior has manual seats without heating or ventilation functions, a 6-speaker sound system, and slower 15W USB-C charging with no wireless chargers. Ambient lighting, illuminated vanity mirrors, panoramic sunroof, and side curtain airbags have been removed. The second row's HVAC vents, USB charging outlets, and center fold-down armrest are also removed.

The top trim levels of the B10 are equipped with a 128-line Hesai ATX LiDAR sensor, three mmWave radars, two front-facing 8MP cameras, a 360-degree camera system, and a Qualcomm Snapdragon Ride 8650 SoC enabling high-end ADAS functions. The system is expected to be updated to have supervised urban autonomous driving by the end of 2025.

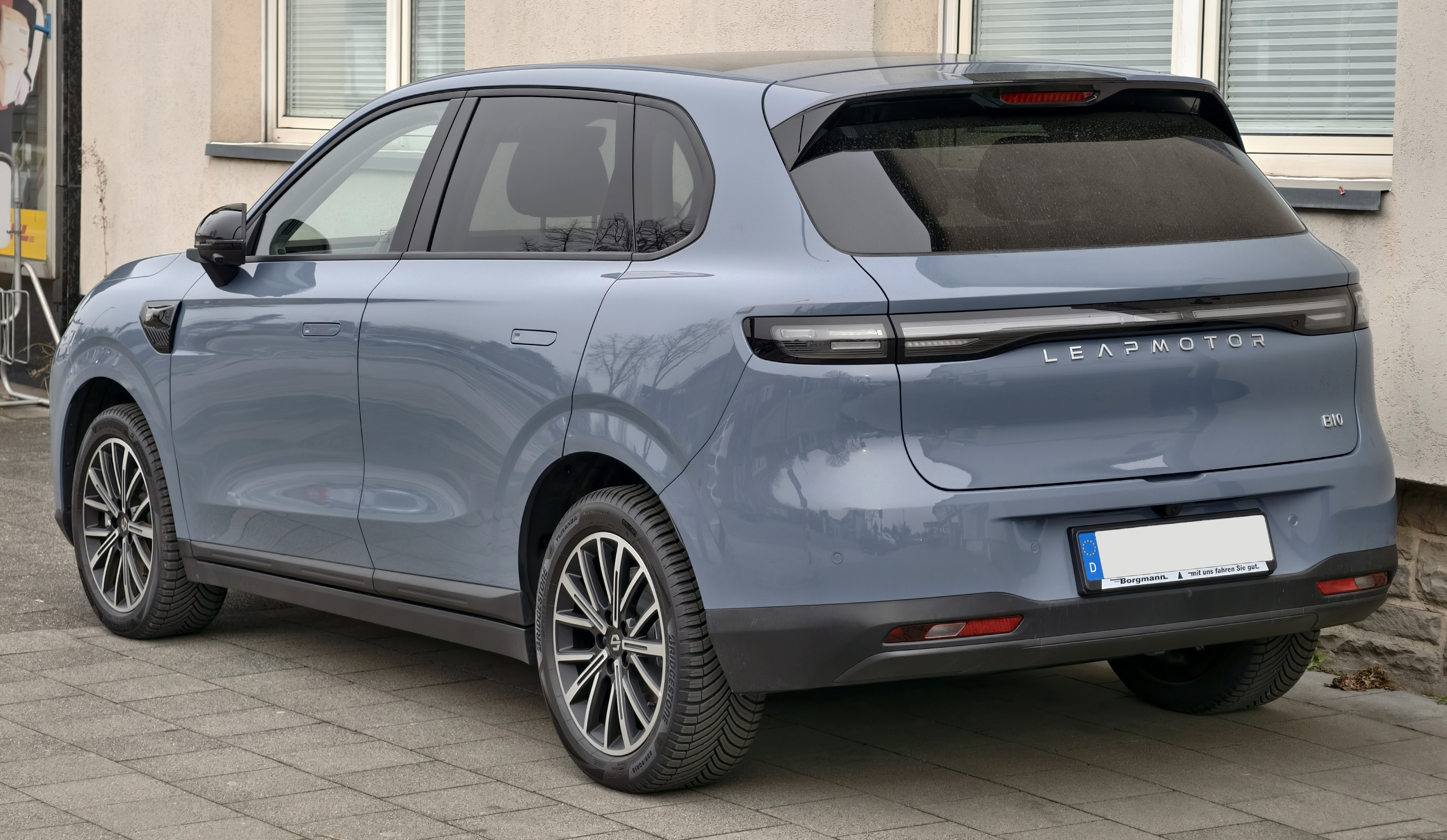
Rear view

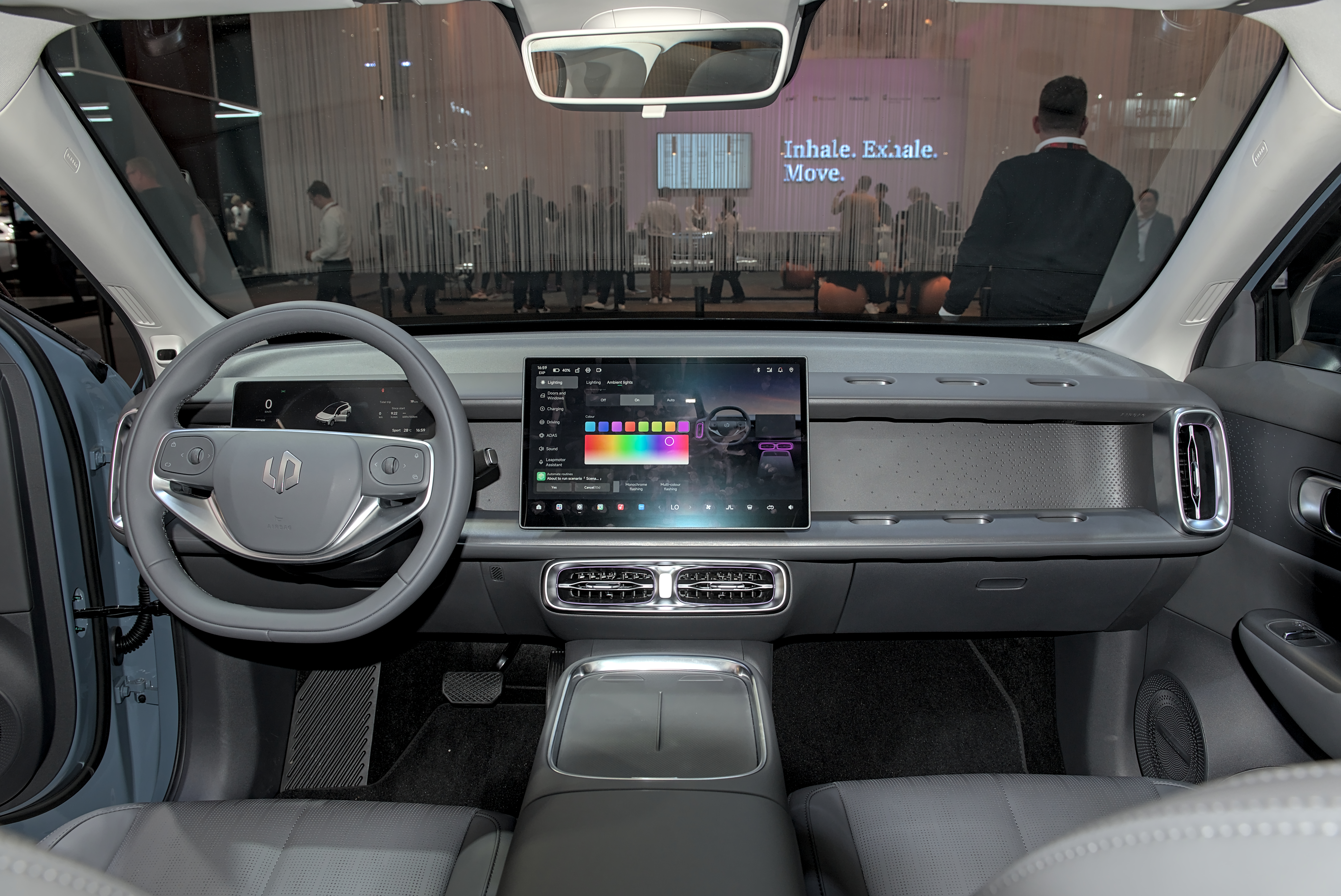
Interior

=== 2026 update ===
On 16 July 2026, the updated B10, marketed as the 2027 model year, was released in China with updated powertrains and minor changes to the interior and exterior. The interior features a new 50-inch augmented-reality heads-up display and the central touchscreen is upgraded to a 17.3-inch 3K resolution unit; both became powered by a Snapdragon 8295P SoC on all variants. The front row seats have access to a 'zero-gravity' recline mode with 4-way lumbar adjustment and a massage function, and the driver's headrest features integrated speakers. All variants became fitted with 60-watt wired charging and 50-watt active-cooled wireless charging pads. The slotted design in the dashboard has been scrapped, resulting in a conventional recessed shelf. The rear window features a windshield wiper, and an automatic rain-sensing wiper function was added. Additionally, teal driver-assistance warning lights were added to the exterior for models equipped with the upgraded ADAS system.

The powertrain was updated with new battery packs for every variant and upgraded motors for all but the base variant. The standard battery pack has an upgraded 60.8 kWh LFP pack which provides 540 kilometres (336 mi) of CLTC range and is paired with a new 241 horsepower (180 kW; 244 PS) motor. The larger battery pack is an upgraded 69.7 kWh LFP pack which provides 610 kilometres (379 mi) of CLTC range and is paired with a new 248 horsepower (185 kW; 251 PS) motor; it uses 800-volt class power electronics to achieve a 30–80% charge time of 16 minutes.

== Powertrain ==
The B10 comes with a choice of two rear-wheel drive battery electric powertrains, both using an 400V electrical architecture. Only the base model comes with a 132 kW (177 hp; 179 PS) motor powered by a 56.2 kWh LFP battery pack allowing for 510 kilometres (317 mi) of CLTC range, while all other models have a 160 kW (215 hp; 218 PS) motor powered by either the 56.2 kWh pack or a 67.1 kWh LFP battery pack, the latter allowing for 600 kilometres (373 mi) of range. Leapmotor claims a 30–80% charge time of 20 minutes or lower when DC fast charging for either pack.

For 2026, the battery packs have been updated to 60.8 and 69.7 kWh LFP packs providing 540 and 610 kilometres (336 and 379 mi) of CLTC range, respectively. Variants with the smaller battery are equipped with a new 180 kW (241 hp; 245 PS) motor, except for the base trim which retains the old 132 kW unit. Variants with the larger battery are equipped with a 185 kW (248 hp; 252 PS) motor and use 800-volt power electronics, allowing for a 30–80% charge time in 16 minutes.

Model	Year	Battery		Motor			Range	30–80% charge time	0–100 km/h (62 mph) time	Top speed	Kerb weight
Model	Year	Type	Weight	Type	Power	Torque	CLTC	30–80% charge time	0–100 km/h (62 mph) time	Top speed	Kerb weight
510 Comfort	2025–26	56.2 kWh LFP	410 kg (904 lb)	TZ180XS101 PMSM	132 kW (177 hp; 179 PS)	175 N⋅m (129 lb⋅ft)	510 km (317 mi)	19 min	9.3 s	160 km/h (99 mph)	1,670 kg (3,682 lb)
510 Joy, LiDAR	2025–26	56.2 kWh LFP	410 kg (904 lb)	TZ180XY005 PMSM	160 kW (215 hp; 218 PS)	240 N⋅m (177 lb⋅ft)	510 km (317 mi)	19 min	6.8 s	170 km/h (106 mph)	1,705 kg (3,759 lb)
600 Joy, LiDAR	2025–26	67.1 kWh LFP	461 kg (1,016 lb)	TZ180XY005 PMSM	160 kW (215 hp; 218 PS)	240 N⋅m (177 lb⋅ft)	600 km (373 mi)	20 min	6.8 s	170 km/h (106 mph)	1,756 kg (3,871 lb)
540 Comfort	2026–present	60.8 kWh LFP	435 kg (959 lb)	TZ180XS101 PMSM	132 kW (177 hp; 179 PS)	175 N⋅m (129 lb⋅ft)	540 km (336 mi)	21 min	9.6 s	160 km/h (99 mph)	1,690 kg (3,726 lb)
540 Joy, LiDAR	2026–present	60.8 kWh LFP	435 kg (959 lb)	TZ180QY073 PMSM	180 kW (241 hp; 245 PS)	255 N⋅m (188 lb⋅ft)	540 km (336 mi)	21 min	6.6 s	180 km/h (112 mph)	1,745 kg (3,847 lb)
610 Joy, LiDAR	2026–present	69.7 kWh LFP	481 kg (1,060 lb)	TZ180QY075 PMSM	185 kW (248 hp; 252 PS)	260 N⋅m (192 lb⋅ft)	610 km (379 mi)	16 min	6.4 s	180 km/h (112 mph)	1,795 kg (3,957 lb)

== Markets ==
=== Africa ===
==== South Africa ====
The B10 was launched in South Africa on 18 August 2026. It is available as the range extended electric version (REEV) with two variants: Style and Design.

=== Asia ===
==== Malaysia ====
The B10 was launched in Malaysia on 10 December 2025, with two variants: Life (56.2 kWh) and Design (67.1 kWh).

In September 2026, the B10 became locally assembled in Gurun, Kedah at the Stellantis Gurun Plant. The CKD model is available in the sole Design variant using the same 67.1 kWh battery pack from the CBU model.

==== Singapore ====
The B10 was launched in Singapore on 15 September 2025 under distributor Cycle & Carriage, in the sole Electric variant using the 67.1 kWh battery pack.

==== Thailand ====
The B10 was launched in Thailand on 10 October 2025, it is offered in three trim levels: Life (56.2 kWh), Style (67.1 kWh) and Design (67.1 kWh).

=== Europe ===
The B10 was introduced in Europe in September 2025, with the first batch of B10 units were shipped earlier in late August 2025. In Europe, two trim levels are available: Life and Design. For powertrains, it is available with 56.2 kWh (Pro) and 67.1 kWh (Pro Max) battery pack options.

=== Latin America ===
==== Mexico ====
The B10 was launched in Mexico on 22 June 2026, as part of Leapmotor's introduction to the Mexican market. It is available in the sole EREV variant using the 18.8 kWh battery pack.

=== Oceania ===
==== Australia ====
The B10 went on sale in Australia on 1 October 2025, with two variants: Style (56.2 kWh) and Design Long Range (67.1 kWh). At the time of its introduction, the B10 was the cheapest battery electric vehicle (BEV) on sale in Australia. In June 2026, the EREV model marketed as a Hybrid in Australia was introduced for the Style and Design trims.

==== New Zealand ====
The B10 was launched in New Zealand on 13 November 2025, with two variants: Life (56.2 kWh) and Design (67.1 kWh).

In June 2026, the EREV model marketed as the Ultra Hybrid in New Zealand was introduced for the Life and Design trims.

== Safety ==
Euro NCAP test results Leapmotor B10 Design (LHD) (2025)
Test	Points	%
Overall:	5 /5 stars	
Adult occupant:	37.3	93%
Child occupant:	46.0	93%
Pedestrian:	53.0	84%
Safety assist:	15.4	85%

ANCAP test results Leapmotor B10 (2025, aligned with Euro NCAP)
Test	Points	%
Overall:	5 /5 stars	
Adult occupant:	37.29	93%
Child occupant:	47.00	95%
Pedestrian:	53.04	84%
Safety assist:	16.65	86%

== Sales ==
In the first hour after pre-sales opened the B10 received 15,010 orders, of which 73% of which were models equipped with LiDAR. Leapmotor received 10,016 firm orders for the B10 in the first hour after its launch on 10 April 2025.

Year	China	Australia
2025	70,335	65
