= F/A-18 Hornet 3.0 =

1997 combat flight simulator video game

- Developer: Graphic Simulations
- Publisher: Graphic Simulations
- Platforms: Windows, Mac OS
- Release: WW: 1997
- Genre: Combat flight simulator
- Modes: Single-player, multiplayer

F/A-18 Hornet 3.0 is a video game developed and published by Graphic Simulations for the Macintosh and Windows in 1997. A successor game, F/A-18 Korea, was released in 1998.

== Gameplay ==
F/A-18 Hornet 3.0 adds to the mission set from F/A-18 Hornet 2.0, featuring an interactive training guide for the player.

== Development ==
The game was released for Mac computers in October 1993.

== Reception ==
Next Generation rated it three stars out of five, and stated that "Hornet 3.0 won't make your jaw drop, but it won't leave you feeling ripped off either. With just enough new features to justify the incremental version number increase, it's worth the time of Mac flight fans."

It debuted at #8 on PC Data's monthly Mac games sales chart for April 1997.
