= Leapmotor B01 =

Battery electric compact sedan

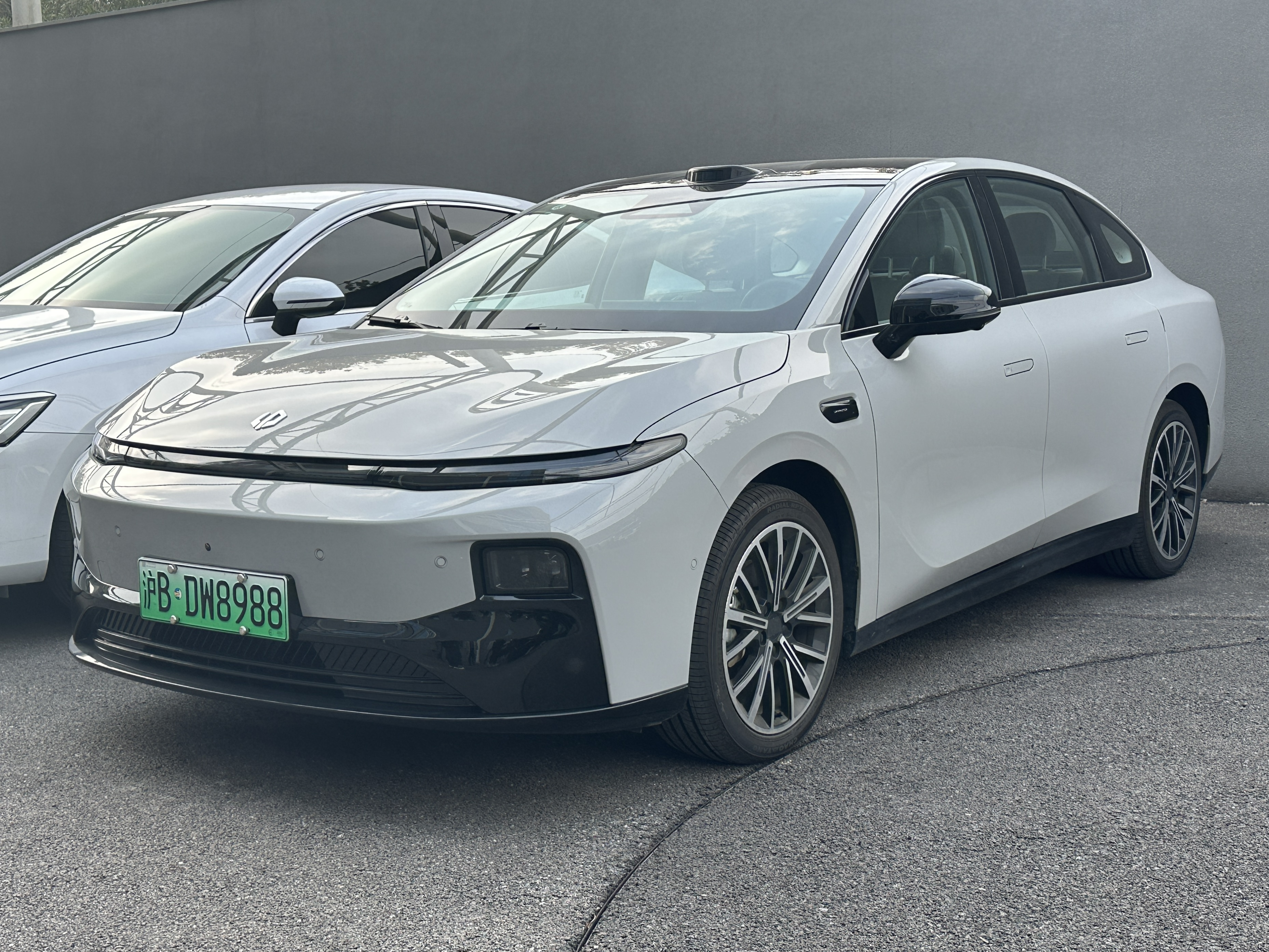

Overview
- Manufacturer: Leapmotor
- Production: July 2025 – present
- Assembly: China: Jinhua, Zhejiang

Body and chassis
- Class: Compact car (C)
- Body style: 4-door sedan
- Layout: Rear-motor, rear-wheel-drive
- Platform: LEAP 3.5
- Related: Leapmotor A10 / B03X; Leapmotor B10; Leapmotor Lafa 5 / B05

Powertrain
- Electric motor: Permanent magnet synchronous
- Power output: 132–185 kW (177–248 hp; 179–252 PS)
- Battery: 43.9 kWh LFP Gotion; 56.2 kWh LFP CALB/SVOLT/Gotion/Zenergy; 60.8 kWh LFP CALB/Gotion; 67.1 kWh LFP CATL; 69.7 kWh LFP CATL/Gotion
- Electric range: 510–670 km (320–420 mi) (CLTC)

Dimensions
- Wheelbase: 2,735 mm (107.7 in)
- Length: 4,770 mm (187.8 in)
- Width: 1,880 mm (74.0 in)
- Height: 1,490 mm (58.7 in)
- Curb weight: 1,550–1,745 kg (3,417–3,847 lb)

The Leapmotor B01 (Chinese: 零跑B01; pinyin: Língpǎo B01) is a battery electric compact sedan (C-segment) manufactured by Leapmotor since 2025. It is the second vehicle in the C-series model range after the B10.

The B01 was unveiled in April 2025 at the 2025 Shanghai Auto Show, and two months later, pre-sales were opened on June 29 of the same year.

== Overview ==
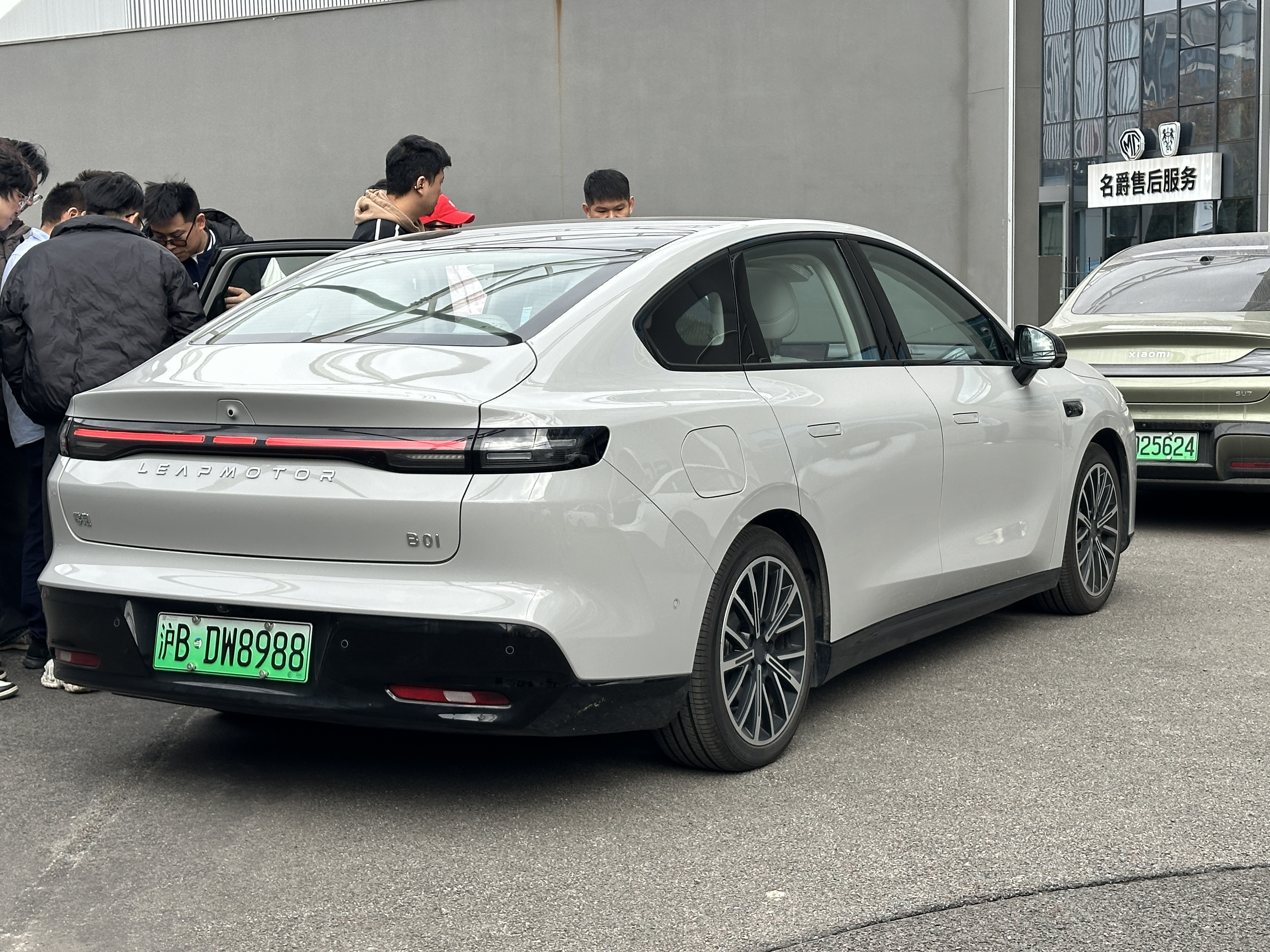
Rear view

The B01 uses the same LEAP 3.5 platform with the Leapmotor B10 that was introduced earlier in the month.

It follows the Gravity Field design language of other Leapmotor models with a split headlight design and three-strip daytime running lights as well as pop-out door handles, 18-inch alloy wheels, and light bar style taillights.

=== Features ===
The interior uses a 14.6-inch 2.5K touchscreen and an 8.8-inch digital cluster that supports over-the-air updates. The touchscreen is powered by a Qualcomm Snapdragon 8155 chip on most models and is powered by a Snapdragon 8295 chip on high-end models. A 256-color ambient lighting system is also included on the B01. Higher trims levels receive a LiDAR system and Qualcomm Snapdragon Ride 8650 chip powering its ADAS system. All trim levels use adjustable heated and ventilated front seats.

=== 2026 update ===
On 16 July 2026, the updated B01, marketed as the 2027 model year, was released in China with updated powertrains and minor changes to the interior and exterior. The exterior is now available in two new paint colors: Liquid Silver and Cloudy Purple. The central infotainment touchscreen has been upgraded to a 17.3-inch 3K-resolution unit and is supplemented by a new 55-inch augmented-reality heads-up display, and all variants are now powered by the Snapdragon 8295P SoC. The wired charging ports have been upgraded to output up to 60 watts, and the wireless charging pads are now twin active-cooled 50-watt units. The front row now has optional 'zero-gravity' recline function with extending legrest and massage function, and the driver's headrest now has integrated personal speakers. The accessory mounting slots on the dashboard have been removed, resulting in a recessed shelf design, and the center console now has a split-opening lid. Trunk volume has increased from 460 L (16.2 cu ft) to 550 L (19.4 cu ft).

The powertrain has been updated with new battery packs for every variant and more powerful motors for most variants. The larger battery pack is now equipped with 800-volt class power electronics, resulting in a 30–80% charging time of 16 minutes.

== Powertrain ==
As with the B10, the B01 is available with two rear-wheel-drive electric powertrains with both models on an 400-volt charging architecture. The base model uses a 132 kW (177 hp; 179 PS) electric motor mounted on the rear axle while all other trims use a 160 kW (215 hp; 218 PS) motor mounted the same way. All trims use both 56.2 kWh and 67.1 kWh LFP batteries except for the base trim, which uses a 43.9 kWh LFP battery paired with a weaker 100 kW (134 hp; 136 PS) motor. Models with the 56.2 kWh battery can travel 510 to 550 kilometres (317 to 342 mi) on a single charge while models with the 67.1 kWh battery can travel 650 kilometres (404 mi) on a single charge. DC fast charging from 30% to 80% is around 20 minutes regardless of which battery the car has.

For 2026, the battery options were updated to larger 67.1 kWh and 69.7 kWh LFP packs providing 590 and 670 kilometres (367 and 416 mi) of CLTC range, respectively. The base variant retains the old 132 kW (177 hp; 179 PS) motor, while the remaining smaller battery variants receive a 180 kW (241 hp; 245 PS) motor and larger battery variants have a 185 kW (248 hp; 252 PS) motor. The larger battery variants are equipped with 800-volt class power electronics, allowing for a 30–80% charge time of 16 minutes.

Specifications
Model	Year	Battery		Motor	Power	Torque	Range	30–80% time	0–100 km/h (62 mph)	Top speed	Kerb weight
Model	Year	Type	Weight	Motor	Power	Torque	CLTC	30–80% time	0–100 km/h (62 mph)	Top speed	Kerb weight
430 Comfort	2025–26	43.9 kWh LFP	340 kg (750 lb)	TZ180XS102 PMSM	134 hp (100 kW; 136 PS)	175 N⋅m (129 lb⋅ft)	430 km (267 mi)	18 min	9.4	150 km/h (93 mph)	1,550 kg (3,417 lb)
550 Comfort, Smart	2025–26	56.2 kWh LFP	410–418 kg (904–922 lb)	TZ180XS101 PMSM	177 hp (132 kW; 179 PS)	175 N⋅m (129 lb⋅ft)	550 km (342 mi)	18 min	8.7	150 km/h (93 mph)	1,625 kg (3,583 lb)
550 Enjoy, LiDAR	2025–26	56.2 kWh LFP	410–418 kg (904–922 lb)	TZ180XY005 PMSM	215 hp (160 kW; 218 PS)	240 N⋅m (177 lb⋅ft)	550 km (342 mi)	18 min	6.4	160 km/h (99 mph)	1,660 kg (3,660 lb)
650 Enjoy, LiDAR	2025–26	67.1 kWh LFP	461 kg (1,016 lb)	TZ180XY005 PMSM	215 hp (160 kW; 218 PS)	240 N⋅m (177 lb⋅ft)	650 km (404 mi)	19 min	6.5	160 km/h (99 mph)	1,711 kg (3,772 lb)
590 Comfort	2026–present	60.8 kWh LFP	435 kg (959 lb)	TZ180XS101 PMSM	177 hp (132 kW; 179 PS)	175 N⋅m (129 lb⋅ft)	590 km (367 mi)	21 min	9.1	150 km/h (93 mph)	1,645 kg (3,627 lb)
590 Enjoy, LiDAR	2026–present	60.8 kWh LFP	435 kg (959 lb)	TZ180QY073 PMSM	241 hp (180 kW; 244 PS)	255 N⋅m (188 lb⋅ft)	590 km (367 mi)	21 min	6.3	170 km/h (106 mph)	1,699 kg (3,746 lb)
670 Enjoy, LiDAR	2026–present	69.7 kWh LFP	481 kg (1,060 lb)	TZ180QY075 PMSM	248 hp (185 kW; 251 PS)	260 N⋅m (192 lb⋅ft)	670 km (416 mi)	16 min	6.1	170 km/h (106 mph)	1,745 kg (3,847 lb)

== Sales ==
Year	China
2025	54,533
