= Leapmotor A05 =

Battery electric subcompact hatchback

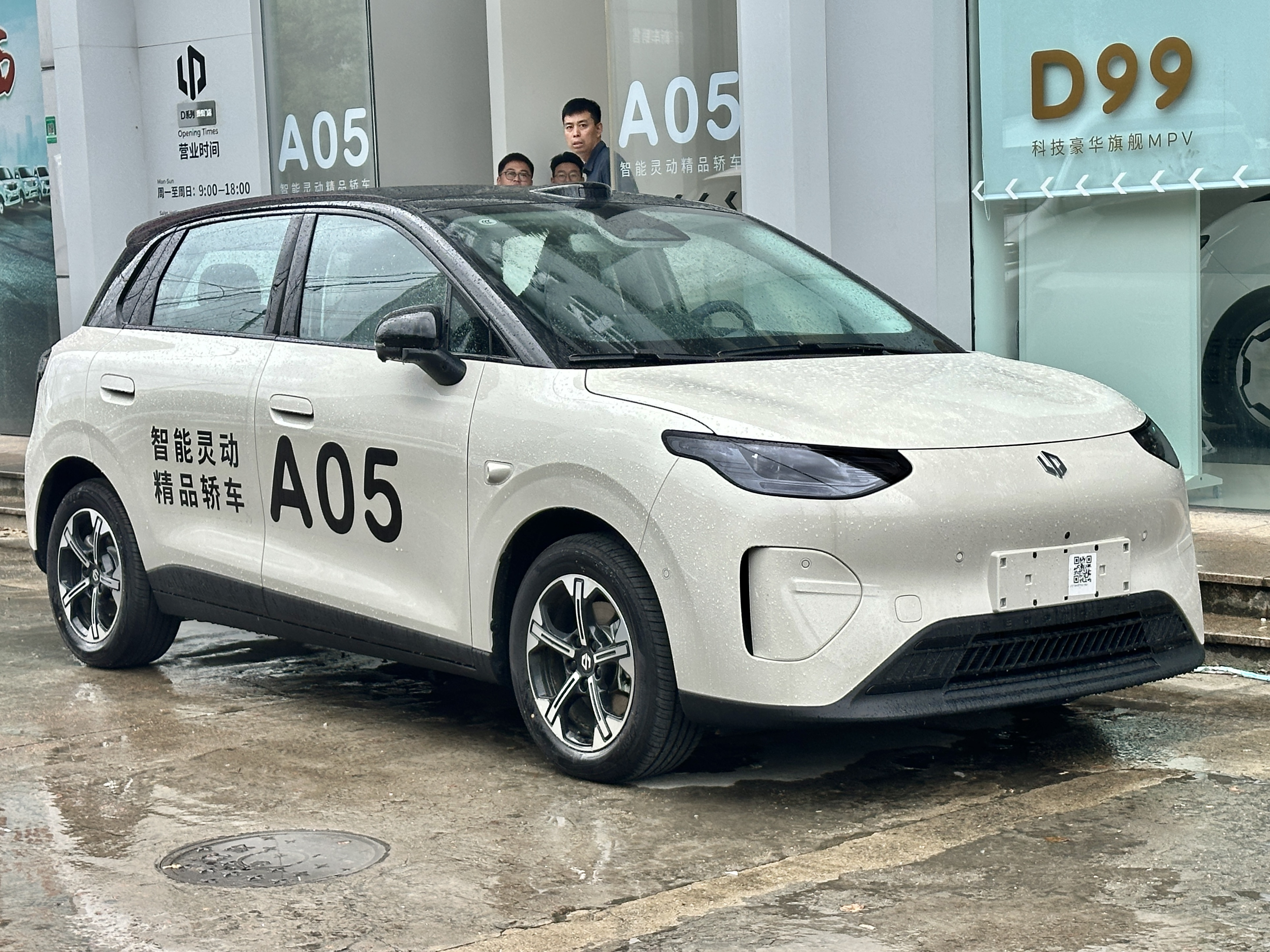

Overview
- Manufacturer: Leapmotor
- Also called: Leapmotor B03 (export)
- Production: 2026–present
- Assembly: China: Jinhua, Zhejiang

Body and chassis
- Class: Subcompact car (B)
- Body style: 5-door hatchback
- Layout: Front-motor, front-wheel-drive
- Related: Leapmotor A10 / B03X

Powertrain
- Electric motor: TZ180QY057 permanent-magnet synchronous motor
- Power output: 94–121 hp (70–90 kW; 95–123 PS) (China); 194 hp (145 kW; 197 PS) (export)
- Battery: 39.8 kWh LFP Gotion; 53 kWh LFP Gotion

Dimensions
- Wheelbase: 2,605 mm (102.6 in)
- Length: 4,200 mm (165.4 in)
- Width: 1,800 mm (70.9 in)
- Height: 1,560 mm (61.4 in)

The Leapmotor A05 (Chinese: 零跑A05; pinyin: Língpǎo A05) is a battery electric subcompact hatchback produced by Leapmotor since 2026.

It is also known outside China as the Leapmotor B03, to prevent confusion on the vehicle segment as the model occupies the B-segment.

== Overview ==
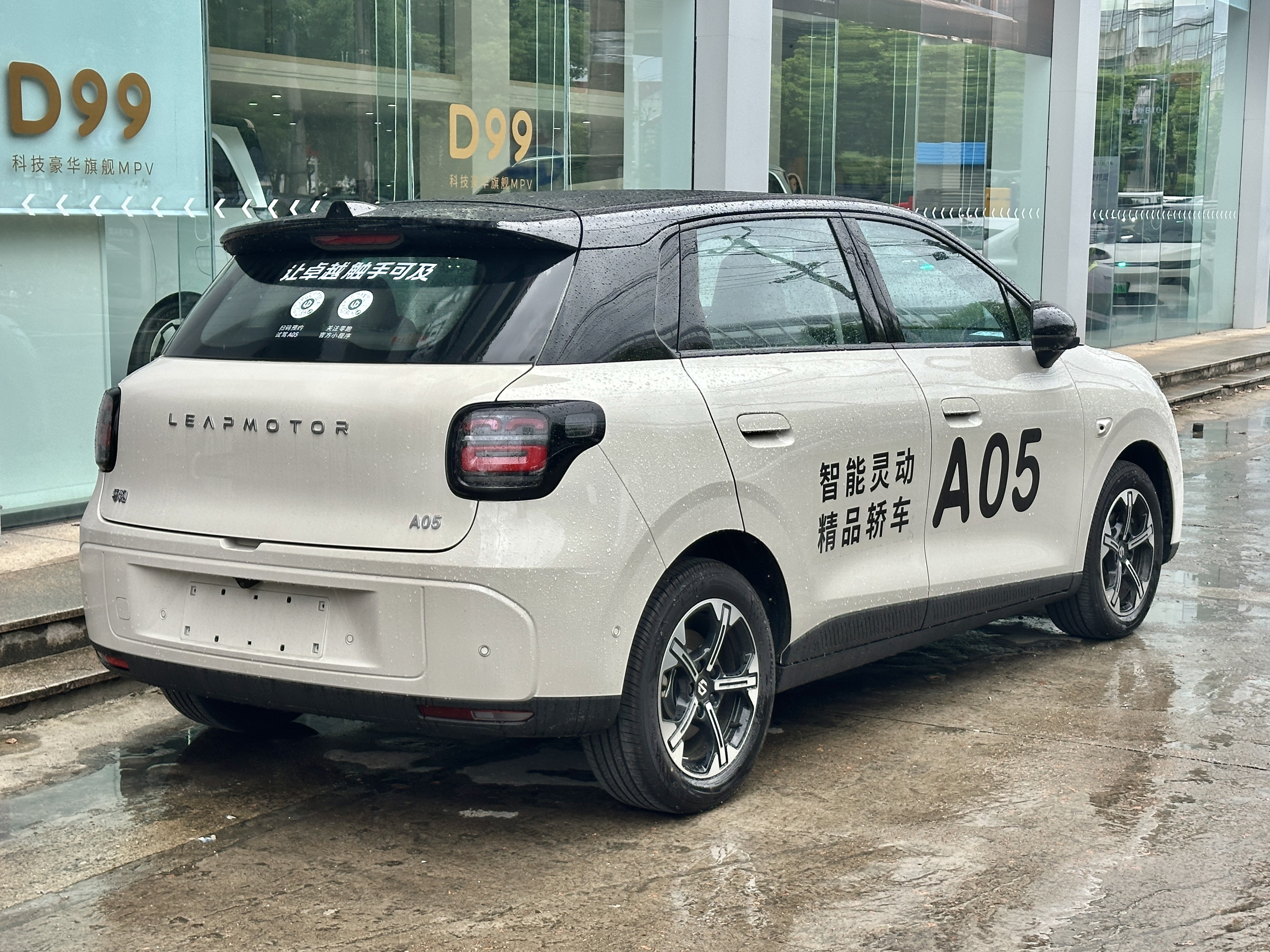
Rear view

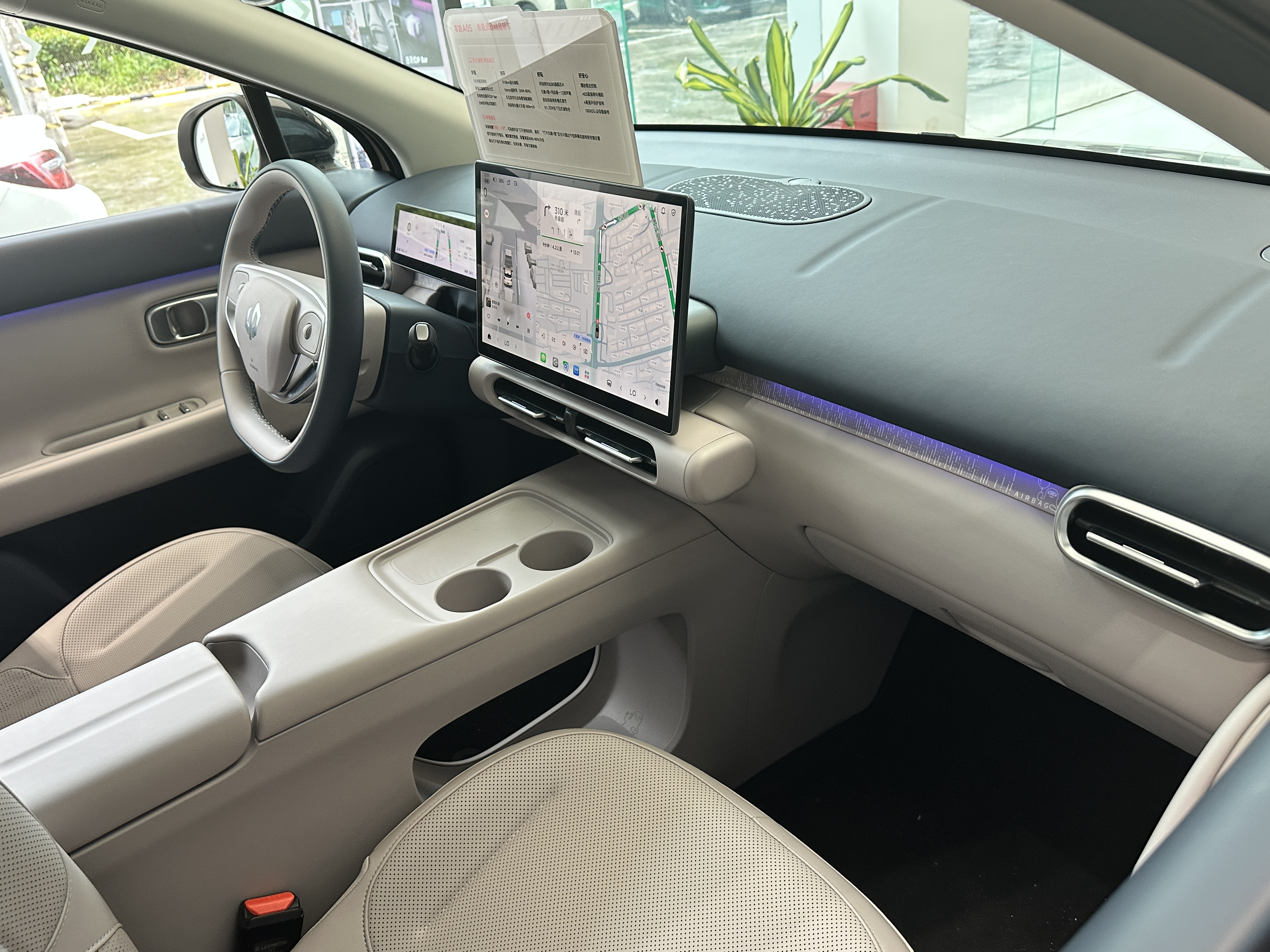
Interior

In April 2025, during the Shanghai Auto Show, Leapmotor CEO Zhu Jiangming revealed that two small SUVs would be launched by the company, named the A10 and A05, the first of which was revealed in 2025 and will also be sold in Europe as the Leapmotor B03X.

The A05 is the second of the two A-series models. Leapmotor's global quality director, Ding Yongfei, also stated on 19 December 2025 that the A05, alongside the B10, A10, and the B05 would be produced at the Figueruelas factory in Spain, starting from 2027.

On 13 March 2026, the first photos of the A05 were showcased by the Ministry of Industry and Information Technology. Four months later, the A05 debuted on 20 July 2026.

=== Design ===
The design language of the A05 is similar to that of the A10; however, it has minor details that are exclusive to the A05. Two-tone paint will be optional, and there are multiple different designs for the rims.

=== Features ===
Optional features on the A05 include a LiDAR sensor and a front binocular camera. The LiDAR sensors were previously reserved for the premium Leapmotor models. Symmetrical left and right rearview mirror cameras will also be offered, as will be a front bumper camera.

== Powertrain ==
The motor used by the A05 is a TZ180QY057 permanent-magnet synchronous motor that can proudce between 94 horsepower (70 kW; 95 PS) and 121 hp (90 kW; 123 PS). The battery used is a lithium iron phosphate battery expected to be supplied by either Leapmotor's own Leap Energy subsidiary, Gotion, or Zenergy. The size of the battery pack is yet to be revealed.
