= A-10 Attack! =

1995 video game

- Developer: Parsoft Interactive
- Publisher: Parsoft Interactive
- Programmers: Eric Parker; Todd Hartmann; David Burkhalter; Philip H. Sulak
- Artists: Kevin Abbot; Paul Curtis; Michael Saint; Luke Robinson
- Platform: Apple Macintosh
- Release: 1995
- Genre: Air combat simulation
- Modes: Single-player, multiplayer

A-10 Attack! is a combat flight simulation video game for the Apple Macintosh computer released by Parsoft Interactive in 1995. The game features an A-10 Thunderbolt II aircraft that takes part in a variety of missions in West Germany during a hypothetical limited conventional attack by the Warsaw Pact. A-10 boasted one of the most detailed flight models of any game of its era, a physics model that extended to solid-body interactions with the ground and complete aerodynamics for every object in the game, including ordnance. Macworld rated it "Best Flight Simulator" in a review of Mac simulations.

The game was followed by a sequel named A-10 Cuba!, originally as a stand-alone game on the Mac and Windows-based PC's, but later re-released on the Mac as a plug-in module for the original game. The Mac OS versions were produced by Parsoft, while the PC version of Cuba was a joint production with Activision. This partnership was renewed for Parsoft's final release, Fighter Squadron: The Screamin' Demons Over Europe.

== History ==
Development of what would evolve into A-10 Attack! started after the release of Hellcats: Missions at Leyte Gulf, an expansion pack for Hellcats Over the Pacific that was released in 1992. Although Hellcats managed to do a lot with limited capabilities of the hardware, the game had a number of clear drawbacks. For one, the missions were written in computer code as part of the game engine, which meant the user could not add new missions or modify the existing ones. Another problem was that the vehicles and other objects in the game were hard-coded with various behaviors, which made them difficult to customize. Even the game map itself existed only in the code.

Parsoft started experimenting with a plug-in system to replace the hard-coded objects in Hellcats. Known as the Virtual Battlefield Environment (VBE), the system still required programming tools to build out the objects, but once they were finished, they could be loaded into the game engine from individual files. Adding these into a game simply required the files to be placed in the appropriate directories in the user's file system. VBE allowed anything to be added in this fashion; aircraft, vehicles, missions and maps.

Another problem with Hellcats was its very simple physics, which simulated only the most basic flight dynamics and resulted in flight that was unrealistic in a number of ways. There were no structural limits either, allowing a number of unrealistic extremely high-g maneuvers. A completely new flight engine was created for the VBE system that simulated subsonic aerodynamics with a fair degree of realism, with effects like dutch roll and adverse yaw "falling out" of the engine without being deliberately coded in. Additionally, the system included a new physics engine that featured simple finite element analysis which allowed damage to be realistically simulated, including its effects on the flight dynamics of the aircraft. The resulting simulation was arguably the most advanced of its era.

All of this was combined with an improved version of the graphics engine developed for Hellcats, allowing players to use multiple monitors and any resolution their machine could support. Hellcats used a polygon-based flat-shaded system that utilized differential updating to avoid bottlenecks in the computer bus and thereby improve frame rates. A-10 retained the basics from Hellcats, but added the ability for small areas of texture mapping to be applied, which was used on the vehicles to add roundels and squadron markings. A combination of improved code in the engine and the rapid improvement in computer performance since the release of Hellcats allowed the new engine to feature greatly increased scene complexity.

Early versions of the game were shown at MacWorld Boston in the summer of 1993. At the time, the physics and graphics engines were operational, although there was no "game" per-se. The world consisted of a single-runway airbase and a nearby target range with several "bullseye" targets. This was followed some time later by a fairly functional demo version, which took place on a mythical island with a number of friendly and enemy objects in the area.

For the release version, a series of missions in northern Germany were created, along with a new mission-planning map system that was widely lauded. As the game was being finalized for release, Apple introduced the new PowerMac systems. Running in the 68k emulator, the game proved to be very slow, so a delay followed while they wrote a PowerPC "native" version, and the game was finally delivered in 1995, a full three years after starting development and about a year later than promised.

A-10 Cuba! followed, although at first it did not use VBE and was shipped in the form of a stand-alone application. It was only later that Cuba was re-released to run as a VBE module which allowed it to run in the original application. The VBE specifications were never released to 3rd parties, and the few public comments on the topic from Parsoft claimed it was simply not ready and required work to clean it up and document it. By 1997, Parsoft had already moved onto a new project, and it was clear that VBE had been abandoned.

== Description ==
The "into the cockpit" view displayed an instrument panel that was closely modelled on the real A-10. When holding a hot-key, the user could interact directly with the controls and switches.

Gameplay in A-10 Attack! switched between a mission map and planning system displayed on a 2D map, and the in-game flying. The switch between the two modes could be made at any time during a game, with the plane turning on the autopilot and following the mission outline when the user was in the map mode.

Flight mode was relatively similar to most flight simulators, although control was normally via mouse or a joystick mapped onto the mouse. The "2" view looked down into the cockpit, showing all the instruments in a layout fairly faithful to the actual layout in the A-10. The mechanical cockpit controls and various displays, including the HUD, were all likewise fairly good simulations of the original.

The game included a unique "active hand" system that allowed the player to manipulate the switches and controls without having to remember keyboard commands. Holding down the option key turned off mouse control of the aircraft, and made a hand-cursor appear that could operate the controls by clicking on them. The cursor changed as it moved over the controls to indicate what could be done, clicking, rotating or "rolling" the mechanical controls. Even complex weapons release modes could be controlled in this way, although doing so often required a series of clicks on different controls.

Weapons included a variety of conventional bombs and their laser-guided counterparts, as well as the AIM-9 Sidewinder and HARM missiles, cluster bombs and rockets. However, the cannon remained one of the most important weapons in the game (because the A-10 was built around the GAU-8A gatling gun). Even without completing the missions, the game engine itself was detailed enough to create a sub-game where users attempted to place their Hogs in odd positions on the map, or use the engine for various other tricks.

The in-game mission map and planner, showing the starting state of the Retaliation mission. Clicking the small triangles on the chits displayed a menu allowing the user to interact with those "targets".

In the map mode, any object in the game that was close enough to have become visible to an allied object appeared as a "chit" on the display. Using controls on the chits, the user could move their point of view to those objects, and see what they were doing. At the start of a mission, only friendly or nearby neutral chits would be seen, but as the player flew into the mission, more would become visible as they (or other allied forces) approached them. Additionally, the user could display and control the waypoints for the aircraft in the mission through a dialog-box based editor, customizing their flight plans. Games would typically have the player switch back and forth between flight and the mission map, looking at their progress and perhaps newly spotted targets that were not immediately obvious from the cockpit.

The selection of missions included with the game generally increased in difficulty with a growing number of targets and friendly vehicles. They covered a series of events after a fictional invasion of West Germany by limited Warsaw Pact forces, with the map covering the western Baltic area with Denmark in the upper left. Like Hellcats, the A-10 mission system in VBE allowed the missions to be custom programmed, and some of them included events such as an attempted bombing of a dam. However, as in Hellcats, A-10 did not allow the user to create their own missions.

== Reception ==
Christopher Breen had an extensive review in Computer Gaming World's September 1995 edition. He notes its "extremely fluid" graphics and excellent frame rate, but spends almost half of the article explaining VBE and its future potential. He concludes, "With VBE, A-10 Attack! represents a remarkable first step in a revolutionary Mac-gaming technology. As far as we're concerned, this lowly Hog is a blue-wibbon winner." His only complaints were "occasional crash bugs" and "sadly lacking" manual.

MacUser's Steven Levy briefly reviewed the game as part of a 1995 gaming roundup, awarding it the title of "Best Flight Simulator". He noted its "stunningly realistic" missions and its "gorgeously rendered" landscapes, concluding with a somewhat muted "A-10 Attack is a welcome addition to anyone's virtual battlefield".

Bob LeVitus reviewed the game as part of a flight simulator round-up, which also included Out of the Sun and F/A-18 Hornet. He titles the mini-review "It Soars Above the Rest". However, he complained about the documentation, noting "Its biggest downfall is that its documentation is the weakest of the three flight sims in this review."

Reception

Review scores
Publication	Score
MacUser	4/5
Computer Gaming World	4/5

== Sales ==
The game sold 80,000 units by October 1996.

== See also ==
- A-10 Tank Killer (1989/90)
- A-10 Cuba! (1996)
- Silent Thunder: A-10 Tank Killer II (1996)
