= HLA-A26 =

Human leukocyte antigen serotype

- (MHC Class I, A cell surface antigen)
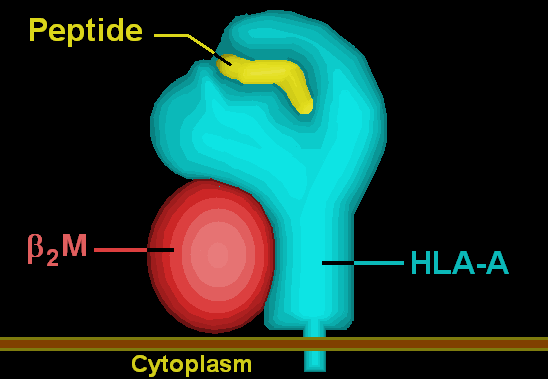
- HLA-A26

About
- Protein: transmembrane receptor/ligand
- Structure: αβ heterodimer
- Subunits: HLA-A*2601, β_{2}-microglobulin
- Older names: A10

Subtypes
| Subtype | allele | Available structures |
| A26.1 | *2601 | |
| {{{cNick2}}} | *26{{{cAllele2}}} | |
| {{{cNick3}}} | *26{{{cAllele3}}} | |
| {{{cNick4}}} | *26{{{cAllele4}}} | |

Rare alleles
| Subtype | allele | Available structures |
| A26.2 | *2602 | |
| A26.4 | *2603 | |
| - | *2605 | |
- Alleles link-out to IMGT/HLA database at EBI

HLA-A26 (A26) is a human leukocyte antigen serotype within HLA-A serotype group. The serotype is determined by the antibody recognition of α^{26} subset of HLA-A α-chains. For A26, the alpha "A" chain are encoded by the HLA-A*26 allele group and the β-chain are encoded by B2M locus. This group currently is dominated by A*2601. A26 and A*26 are almost synonymous in meaning. A26 is a split antigen of the broad antigen serotype A10. A26 is a sister serotype of A25, A34, A43, and A66.

A26 is more common in West Pacific Rim (Taiwan to Hokkaido).

== Serotype ==
A26 recognition of some HLA A*26 gene products
| A*26 | A26 | A10 | Sample |
| allele | % | % | size (N) |
| *2601 | 97 | 2 | 1730 |
| *2602 | 81 | 0 | 31 |
| *2603 | 68 | 8 | 38 |
| *2605 | 90 | 0 | 10 |

A26 reasonably good serotyping with no overt false recognition..

== Distribution ==
HLA A*2601 frequencies
- Study population: Freq. (in %)
- Taiwan Taroko: 21.8
- Taiwan Bunun: 19.3
- Japan Ainu Hokkaido: 17.0
- Taiwan Rukai: 14.0
- USA Hawaii Okinawa: 12.4
- Georgia Tbilisi Kurds: 11.7
- Pakistan Baloch: 10.3
- Oman: 10.2
- Pakistan Burusho: 9.8
- Pakistan Karachi Parsi: 8.3
- China Beijing: 8.2
- Pakistan Sindhi: 8.2
- Japan Central: 8.1
- Pakistan Brahui: 8.0
- Taiwan Atayal: 8.0
- India New Delhi: 7.6
- Bulgaria: 7.3
- PNG New Britain Rabaul: 7.3
- Taiwan Hakka: 6.4
- Georgia Svaneti Svans: 6.3
- Pakistan Pathan: 6.1
- American Samoa: 6.0
- South Korea (3): 6.0
- Israel Arab Druse: 5.5
- Croatia: 5.3
- Taiwan Saisiat: 4.9
- Taiwan Tsou: 4.9
- Cape Verde Northwestern I…: 4.8
- China Tibetan: 4.7
- China Qinghai Hui: 4.5
- Iran Baloch: 4.5
- Russia Tuva (2): 4.5
- France South East: 4.3
- Portugal North: 4.3
- Senegal Niokholo Mandenka: 4.3
- USA Caucasian (2): 4.2
- India Andhra Pradesh Goll…: 4.0
- Taiwan Paiwan: 3.9
- USA Hispanic: 3.9
- Romanian: 3.8
- Jordan Amman: 3.5
- Saudi Arabia Guraiat and …: 3.5
- China Inner Mongolia: 3.4
- Georgia Tbilisi Georgian…: 3.3
- USA Asian: 3.2
- Guinea Bissau: 3.1
- Ireland South: 3.0
- Singapore Javanese Indone…: 3.0
- Taiwan Puyuma: 3.0
- Czech Republic: 2.8
- Taiwan Pazeh: 2.7
- Brazil: 2.5
- PNG Madang: 2.5
- Mexico Guadalajara Mestiz…: 2.4
- Mexico Mestizos: 2.4
- Singapore Chinese Han: 2.3
- Australia New South Wales: 2.2
- China Yunnan Lisu: 2.2
- Burkina Faso Rimaibe: 2.1
- Cameroon Beti: 2.0
- China Guangzhou: 2.0
- Portugal South: 2.0
- Singapore Riau Malay: 2.0
- South Africa Natal Tamil: 2.0
- Taiwan Siraya: 2.0
- USA African Americans (2): 2.0
- India North Hindus: 1.9
- Ireland Northern: 1.8
- Sudanese: 1.8
- Cameroon Yaounde: 1.7
- India North Delhi: 1.7
- Pakistan Kalash: 1.7
- Taiwan Thao: 1.7
- China South Han: 1.6
- USA North American Native…: 1.6
- Zimbabwe Harare Shona: 1.6
- Uganda Kampala: 1.5
- Mongolia Buriat: 1.4
- Thailand: 1.4
- New Caledonia: 1.2
- Zambia Lusaka: 1.2
- Finland: 1.1
- Ch. Guangdong Meizhou H…: 1.0

HLA A*2602 frequencies
- Study population: Freq. (in %)
- Japan Central: 2.3
- USA North American Native…: 1.6
- Japan (5): 1.3
- Japan Okinawa Ryukyuan: 1.1
- Pakistan Brahui: 0.6
- South Korea (3): 0.6
- USA San Antonio Caucasian…: 0.6
- Azores Terceira Island: 0.4
- USA Asian: 0.4
- Beijing Shijiazhuang Tian…: 0.1

HLA A*2603 frequencies
- Study population: Freq. (in %)
- USA Hawaii Okinawa: 8.6
- Japan Okinawa Ryukyuan: 2.8
- Japan Central: 2.4
- Japan Ainu Hokkaido: 2.0
- Japan (5): 1.3
- India North Delhi: 1.1
- South Korea (3): 1.0
- Spain Basque Gipuzkoa Pro…: 0.5
- China Tibetan: 0.3
- Romanian: 0.3
- USA African Americans pop…: 0.3

== Disease associations ==
A26 Serotype is associated with adult T-cell leukemia in Japanese.
