= HLA-A25 =

Human leukocyte antigen serotype

- (MHC Class I, A cell surface antigen)
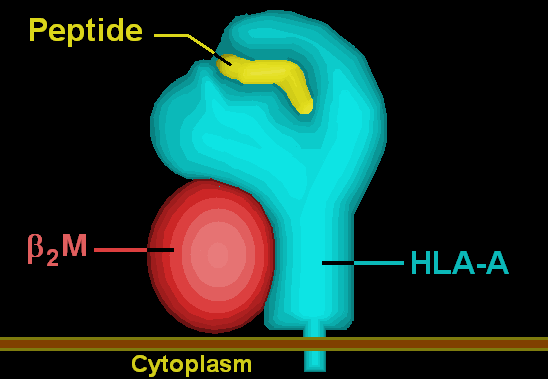
- HLA-A25

About
- Protein: transmembrane receptor/ligand
- Structure: αβ heterodimer
- Subunits: HLA-A*2501, β_{2}-microglobulin
- Older names: A10

Subtypes
| Subtype | allele | Available structures |
| A25 | *2501 | |
| {{{cNick2}}} | *25{{{cAllele2}}} | |
| {{{cNick3}}} | *25{{{cAllele3}}} | |
| {{{cNick4}}} | *25{{{cAllele4}}} | |
- Alleles link-out to IMGT/HLA database at EBI

HLA-A25 (A25) is a human leukocyte antigen serotype within HLA-A serotype group. The serotype is determined by the antibody recognition of α^{25} subset of HLA-A α-chains. For A25, the alpha "A" chain are encoded by the HLA-A*25 allele group and the β-chain are encoded by B2M locus. This group currently is dominated by A*2501. A25 and A*25 are almost synonymous in meaning. A25 is a split antigen of the broad antigen serotype A10. A25 is a sister serotype of A26, A34, A43, and A66.

A25 is more common in SW Asia to NW Europe. A25 is believed to have been formed by a single gene conversion between another HLA-A and the A*2601 allele..

== Serotype ==
A25 recognition of some HLA A*25 gene products
| A*25 | A25 | A10 | Sample |
| allele | % | % | size (N) |
| *2501 | 95 | 2 | 1375 |

A25 reasonably good serotyping with no overt false recognition..

== A25 frequencies ==
HLA A*2501 frequencies
- Study population: Freq. (in %)
- Saudi Arabia: 5.7
- India Jalpaiguri Toto: 5.1
- Russia Northwest: 5.1
- Serbia: 4.8
- Spain Pas Valley: 4.3
- Czech Republic: 4.2
- Spain North Cantabrian: 4.2
- Russia Arkhangelsk Pomors: 4.0
- Spain North Cabuernigo: 3.8
- Ireland South: 3.6
- Romanian: 3.5
- USA Caucasians (3): 3.4
- Croatia: 3.0
- Bulgaria: 2.7
- Spain Basque Arratia Valley: 2.7
- Sweden Uppsala County: 2.5
- Scotland Orkney: 2.5
- German Essen: 2.4
- Wales: 2.1
- Argentina Buenos Aires: 2.0
- Ireland Northern: 2.0
- Morocco: 2.0
- Spain Eastern Andalusia: 2.0
- Australia New South Wales: 1.9
- Georgia Svaneti Svans: 1.9
- Italy: 1.9
- Macedonia: 1.9
- Sweden Stockholm: 1.9
- England Liverpool: 1.9
- Azores Central Islands: 1.8
- Turkey: 1.8
- England Lancaster: 1.8
- England Sheffield: 1.6
- Israeli Jews: 1.5
- Spain Basque Gipuzkoa Pro…: 1.5
- Italy South Campania: 1.2
- New Caledonia: 1.2
- Uganda Kampala: 1.2
- Australia West: 1.1
- Finland: 1.1
- Portugal Centre (2): 1.1
- Spain Catalonia Girona: 1.1
- Belgium: 1.0
- France Corsica: 1.0
- Mongolia Oold: 1.0
- Russia Murmansk Saomi: 1.0
- Russia Sakhalin Island Ni…: 0.9
- France South East: 0.8
- USA South Texas Hispanics: 0.8
- Morocco 'Berber' Nador Me…: 0.7
- USA South Dakota Lakota S…: 0.7
- Greece: 0.6
- USA Arizona Pima: 0.6
- Algeria1: 0.5
- China Qinghai Hui: 0.5

A*2501 distribution is primarily located in Western Eurasia. Frequency tends to be highest in the populations that underwent later neolithization suggesting A*2501 spread in Europe. The high frequency in Saudi Arabia is suggestive of a source.
