= Silent Thunder: A-10 Tank Killer II =

1996 video game

- North American cover art
- Developer: Dynamix
- Publisher: Sierra On-Line
- Director: Frank Evers
- Platform: Windows
- Release: NA: March 1996; EU: 1996
- Genre: Combat flight simulation
- Mode: Single-player

Silent Thunder: A-10 Tank Killer II is a combat flight simulation game for Windows developed by Dynamix and published in 1996 by Sierra On-Line. It is sequel to A-10 Tank Killer. The player takes the role of an American A-10 Thunderbolt II aircraft pilot who fights in campaigns across the world.

== Reviews ==
GameSpot review, Chris Hudak, scored the game 8.5/10 and lauded the game calling it "a wicked, clean, no-B.S. combat sim with enough options and realism to hold the serious gamer's interest."

== See also ==
- A-10 Attack! (1995)
- A-10 Cuba! (1996)
