= HLA-A66 =

Human leukocyte antigen serotype

- (MHC Class I, A cell surface antigen)
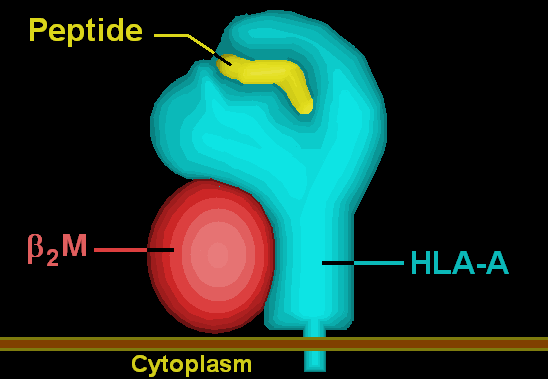
- HLA-A66

About
- Protein: transmembrane receptor/ligand
- Structure: αβ heterodimer
- Subunits: HLA-A*66--, β_{2}-microglobulin
- Older names: A10

Subtypes
Subtype	allele	Available structures
A66.1	*6601	
A66.2	*6602	
{{{cNick3}}}	*66{{{cAllele3}}}	
{{{cNick4}}}	*66{{{cAllele4}}}	

Rare alleles
Subtype	allele	Available structures
A66.3	*6603	
{{{rnick2}}}	*66{{{rallele2}}}	
{{{rnick3}}}	*66{{{rallele3}}}	
- Alleles link-out to IMGT/HLA database at EBI

HLA-A66 (A66) is a human leukocyte antigen serotype within HLA-A serotype group. The serotype is determined by the antibody recognition of α^{66} subset of HLA-A α-chains. For A66, the alpha "A" chain are encoded by the HLA-A*66 allele group and the β-chain are encoded by B2M locus. A66 and A*66 are almost synonymous in meaning. A66 is a split antigen of the broad antigen serotype A10. A66 is a sister serotype of A25, A26, A34, and A43.

A66 is more common in Africa and Southwest Europe. A66 (A*6601) is believed to have been formed by a single gene conversion between another HLA-A and the A*2601 allele..

== Serotype ==
A66 recognition of some HLA A*66 gene products
A*66	A66	A10	A26	A34	Sample
allele	%	%	%	%	size (N)
*6601	20	10	61	8	799
*6602	38	10	4	27	205
*6603	32	7	7	18	28

A66 serotyping is poor. A*6601 is also sometimes recognized by A25, and A*6602 is often recognized by A74.

== A*6601 Frequencies ==
HLA A*6601 frequencies
		freq
ref.	Population	(%)
	Cameroon Sawa	7.7
	Kenya Luo	6.8
	Cameroon Sawa	7.7
	Cameroon Bakola Pygmy	5.8
	Cameroon Baka Pygmy	5.0
	Kenya Nandi	5.0
	Zimbabwe Harare Shona	0.2
	Cameroon Baka Pygmy	5.0
	Cameroon Beti	4.6
	Cameroon Bamileke	4.5
	India West Bhils	4.0
	Zimbabwe Harere Shona	3.8
	Uganda Kampala	3.8
	India Mumbai Marathas	2.5
	Cape Verde Northwestern	2.5
	Czech republic	2.4
	Morocco Nador Metalsa	2.1
	Central Portugal	2.0
	India West Parsis	2.0
	South African Natal Zulu	2.0
	Kenya	1.7
	Tunisia Tunis	1.7
	Guinea Bissau	1.5
	Georgia Tbilisi	1.4
	Zambia Lusaka	1.2
	Italy Bergamo	1.1
	Pakistan Karachi Parsi	1.1
	Oman	0.8
	Sudanese	0.8
	Belgium	0.5
	Southeast France	0.4
	Mongolia Buriat	0.4
	Wales	0.2

HLA A*6602 frequencies
		freq
ref.	Population	(%)
	South African Natal Zulu	1.5
	Cameroon Yaounde	1.1
	Cameroon Bamileke	0.6
	Senegal Niokholo Mandenka	0.5
	Kenya Nandi	0.4
	Zimbabwe Harare Shona	0.2
	Wales	0.03
HLA A*6603 frequencies
		freq
ref.	Population	(%)
	Cameroon Pygmy Baka	10.0
	Cameroon Bakola Pygmy	9.0
	Cameroon Sawa	7.7
	CAR Mbenzele Pygmy	2.8
	Zimbabwe Harare Shona	0.2
