= Leapmotor B05 =

Battery electric compact hatchback

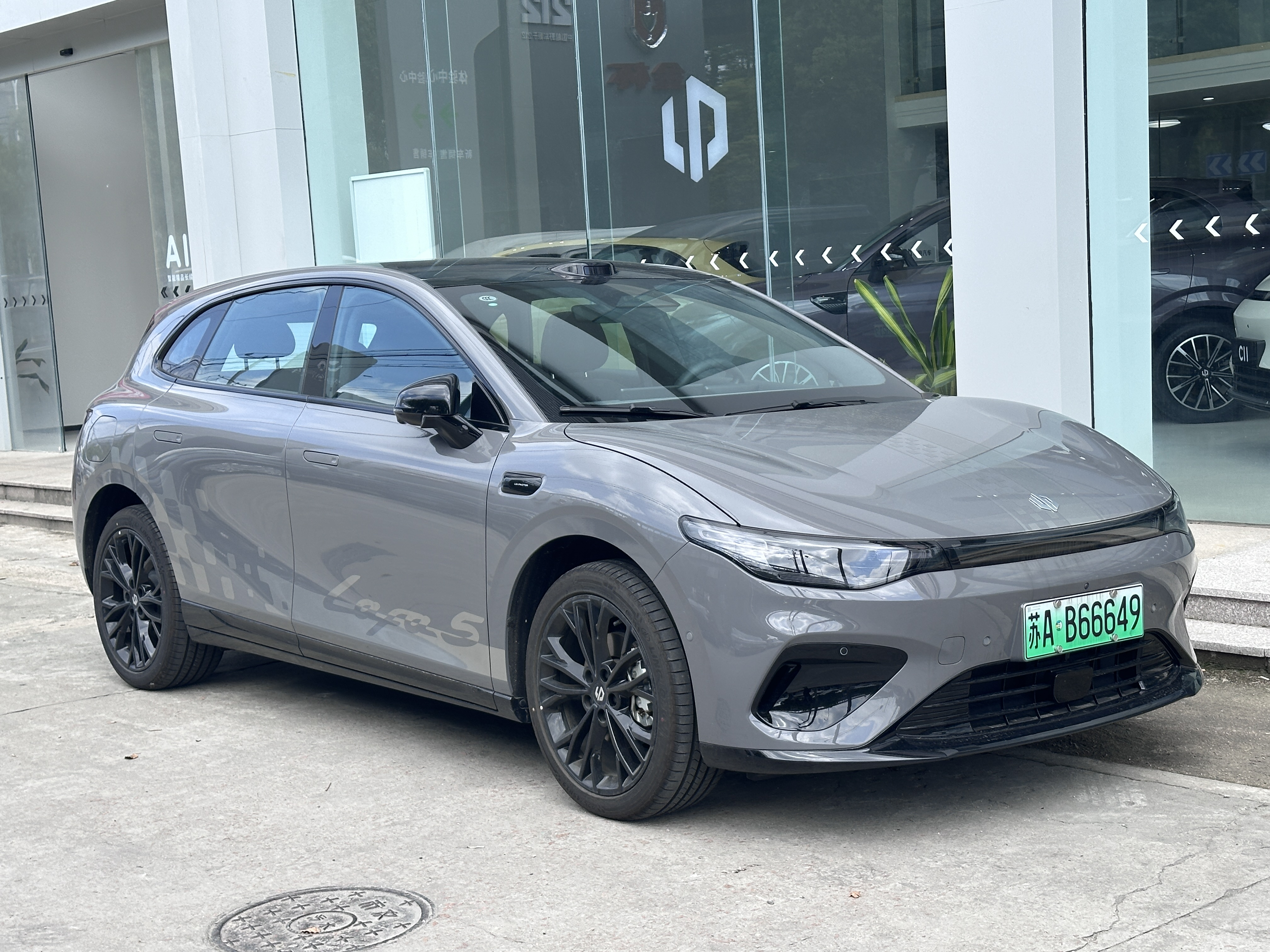

Overview
- Manufacturer: Leapmotor
- Model code: B05
- Also called: Leapmotor Lafa 5 (China)
- Production: 2025–present
- Assembly: China: Jinhua, Zhejiang

Body and chassis
- Class: Compact car (C)
- Body style: 5-door hatchback
- Layout: Rear-motor, rear-wheel-drive
- Platform: LEAP 3.5
- Related: Leapmotor A05; Leapmotor A10 / B03X; Leapmotor B01; Leapmotor B10

Powertrain
- Power output: 132–160 kW (177–215 hp; 179–218 PS)
- Battery: 56.2–67.1 kWh LFP
- Range: 401–482 km (249–300 mi) (WLTP)
- Plug-in charging: 11 kW (AC); 174 kW (DC)

Dimensions
- Wheelbase: 2,735 mm (107.7 in)
- Length: 4,430 mm (174.4 in)
- Width: 1,880 mm (74.0 in)
- Height: 1,520 mm (59.8 in)
- Curb weight: 1,630–1,715 kg (3,594–3,781 lb)

The Leapmotor B05, also marketed in China as the Leapmotor Lafa 5 (Chinese: 零跑Lafa 5; pinyin: Língpǎo Lafa 5) is a battery electric compact hatchback (C-segment) manufactured by Leapmotor since 2025. It is the hatchback alternative to the B01.

The B05 is the brand's first hatchback, before the release of the smaller Leapmotor B03/A05 in 2026.

== Overview ==
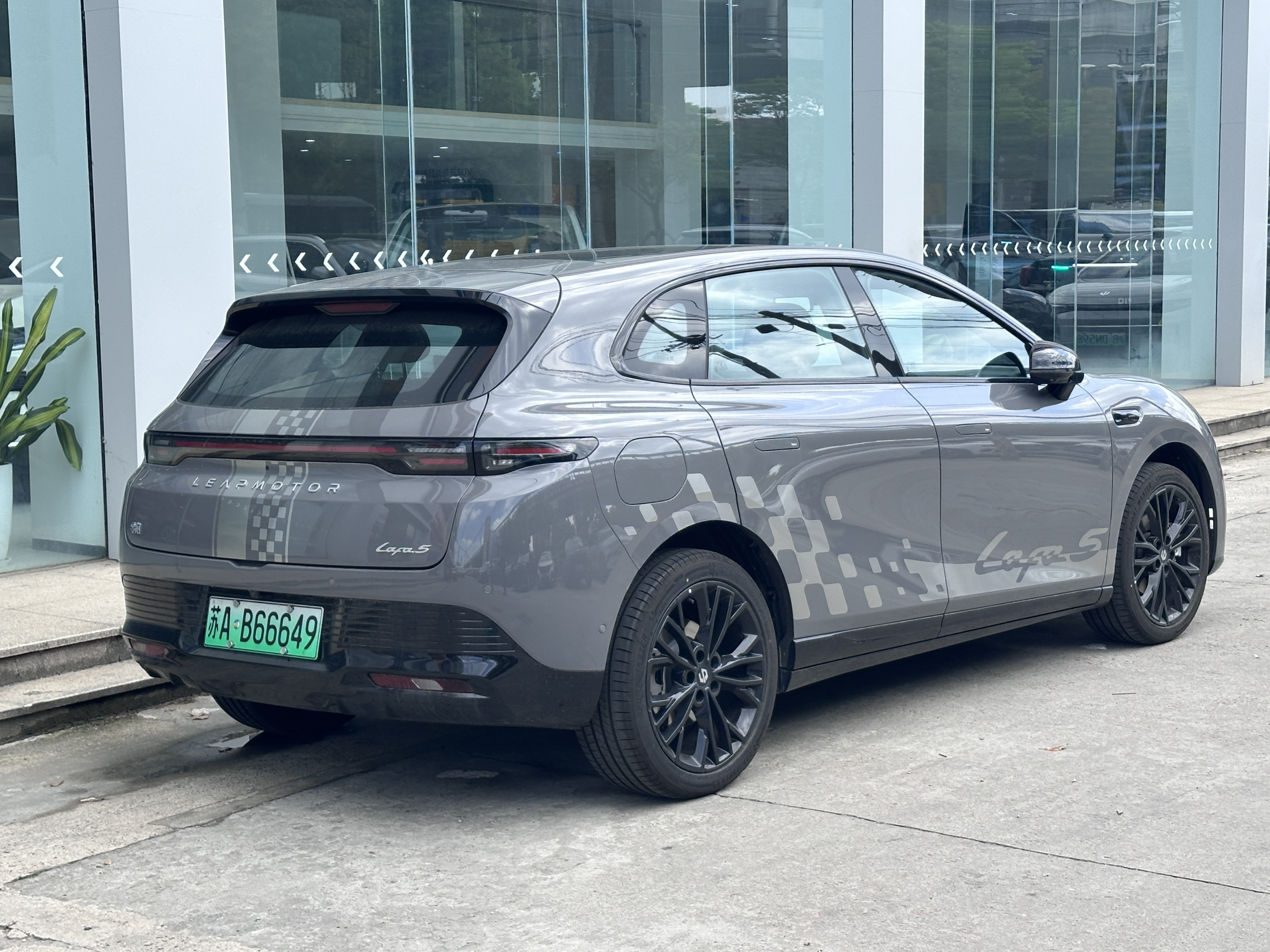
Rear view

Interior

The Lafa 5 is a 5-door hatchback based on the LEAP 3.5 platform, also used across the rest of the B-series model range. It is the first Leapmotor model to break away from the brand's usual naming conventions, adopting the B05 name for markets outside China. The Lafa 5 was launched on 8 September 2025 at the Munich Motor Show in Germany, with pre-sales in China opening the same day.

Production at Stellantis' Figueruelas plant near Zaragoza is set to begin with the B10 in the second half of 2026, with the B05 following in 2027 alongside the A10 and A05.

=== Design and features ===
Spyshots that surfaced online in late August 2025 previewed the Lafa 5's full-width rear tail light and rear spoiler ahead of its unveiling. Leapmotor's design language used on other models is present at both the front and rear.

At its launch at the Munich Motor Show, the Lafa 5 was confirmed to use 19-inch wheels, frameless doors, swooping lines, and flush door handles.

== Powertrain ==
The rear-mounted motor produces 132 kW (177 hp; 179 PS) on the entry variant and 160 kW (215 hp; 218 PS) on other trims. Two LFP battery packs are offered, 56.2 kWh and 67.1 kWh, giving a WLTP range of up to 401 km (249 mi) and 482 km (300 mi) respectively; DC fast charging peaks at 174 kW on both packs. In China, the same packs are rated under the CLTC cycle at 515 km (320 mi) and 605 km (376 mi).

The chassis was co-developed with Stellantis and tuned at Alfa Romeo's Balocco proving ground, giving a 50:50 weight distribution.

== Leapmotor Lafa 5 Ultra / B05 Ultra ==
The Lafa 5 Ultra, a high-performance variant of the standard model, launched on 24 April 2026 at the Beijing International Automotive Exhibition. It uses a more powerful 180 kW (241 hp; 245 PS) rear motor, a 50:50 weight distribution, and a ride height lowered by 10 mm (0.4 in) compared to the standard model, giving a 0–100 km/h (0–62 mph) time of 5.9 seconds. It retains the 56.2 kWh and 67.1 kWh LFP battery options, rated at 500 km and 600 km respectively on the CLTC cycle.

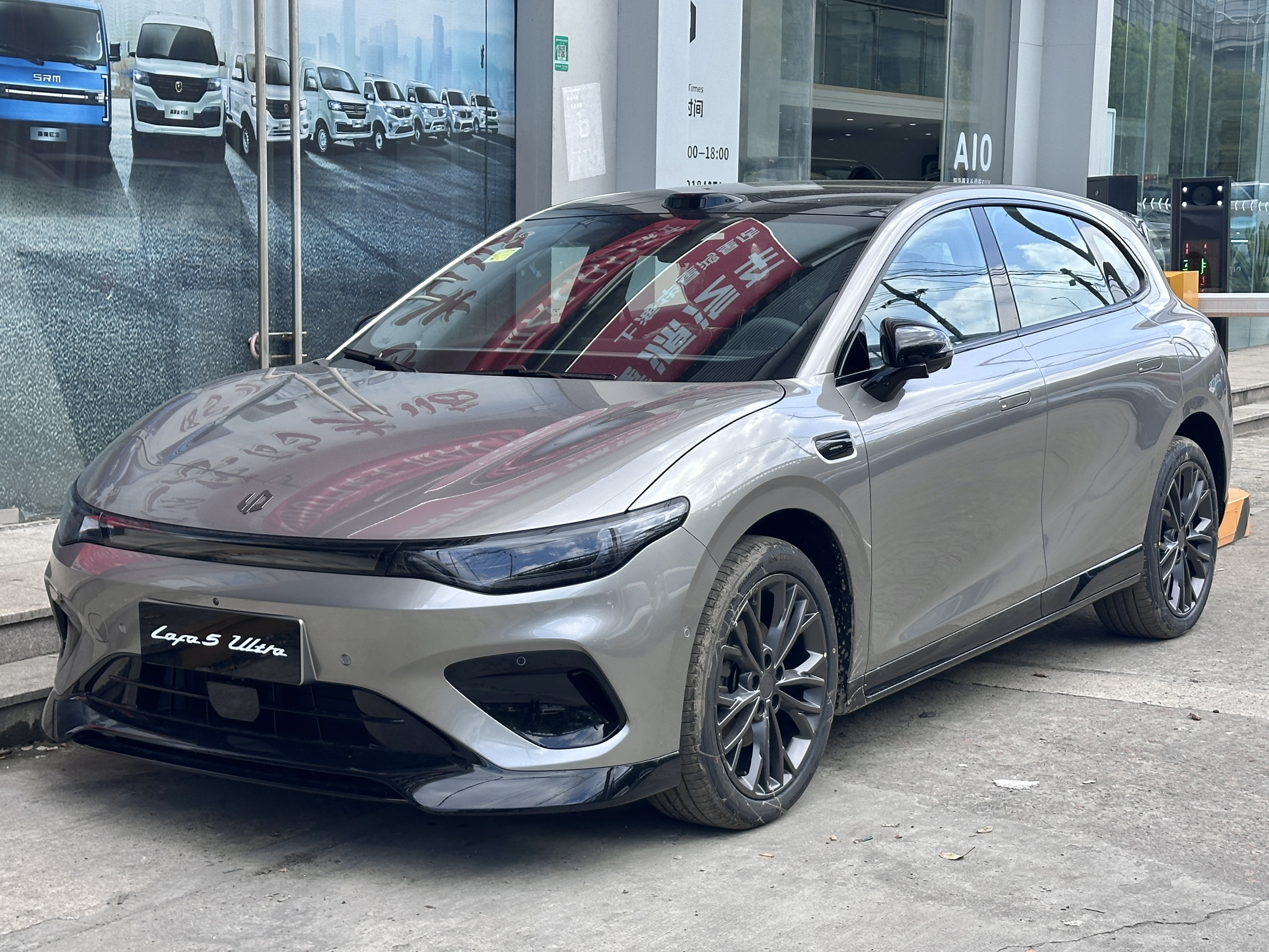
Leapmotor Lafa 5 Ultra

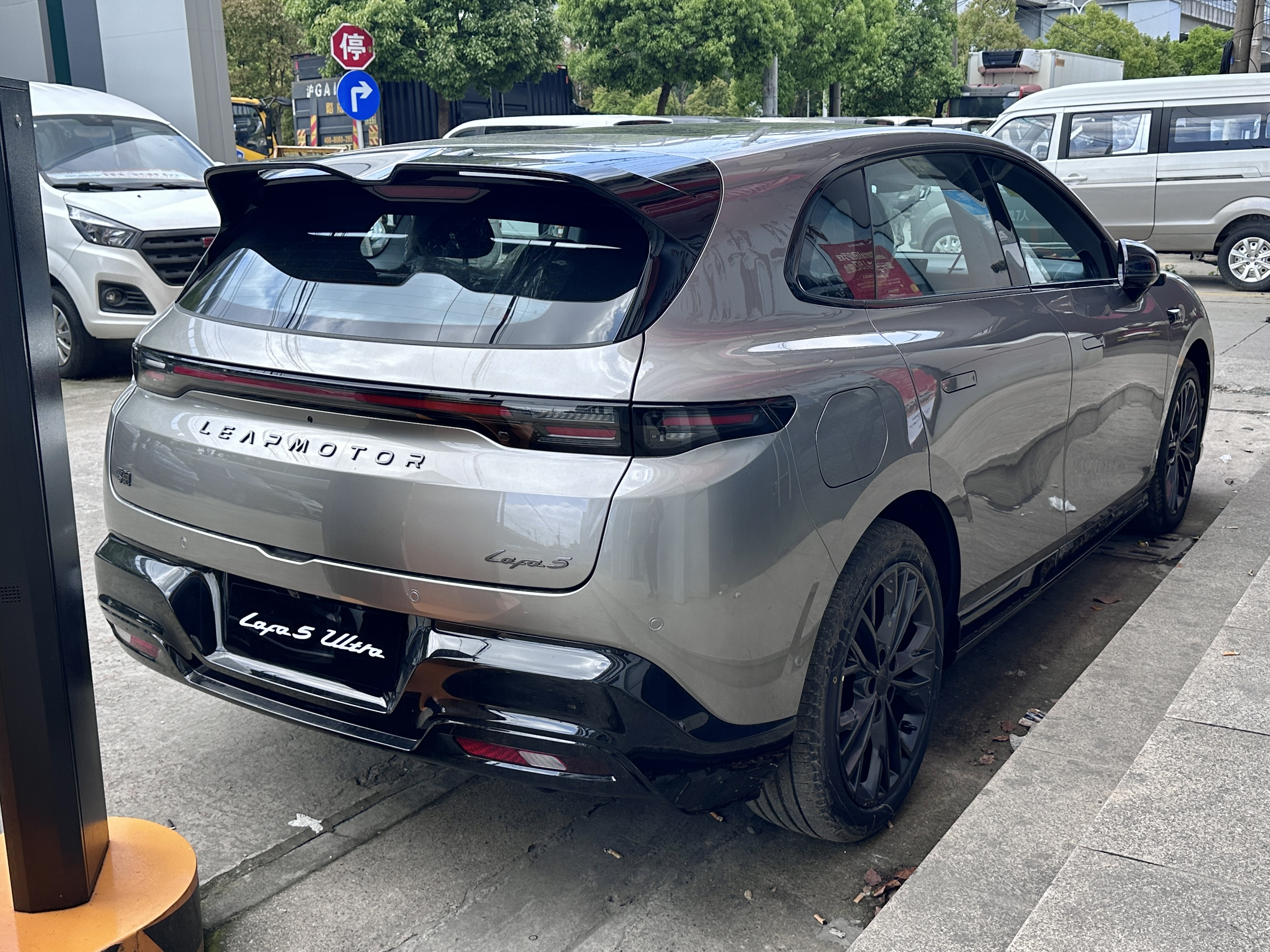
Rear view

== Safety ==
ANCAP test results Leapmotor B05 (2026, aligned with Euro NCAP)
Test	Score
Overall:	5 /5 stars
Safe driving	66%
Crash avoidance	77%
Crash protection	92%
Post crash	89%

Euro NCAP test results Leapmotor B05 (2026)
Test	Score
Overall:	5 /5 stars
Safe driving	66%
Crash avoidance	77%
Crash protection	92%
Post crash	89%

== Markets ==
=== Australia ===
The B05 went on sale in Australia on 1 July 2026, it is available with two variants: Style (56.2 kWh) and Design Long Range (67.1 kWh). At the time of its introduction, the B05 was the cheapest rear-wheel drive battery electric vehicle on sale in Australia.

=== Europe ===
The B05 was released in European in April 2026, starting in Poland at the Poznań Motor Show. For the European market, it is available with 56.2 kWh and ProMax 67.1 kWh battery packs.

=== United Kingdom ===
The B05 went on sale in the UK from July 2026 in a single specification with the 67.1 kWh battery only.

== Sales ==
Year	China
2025	9,700
