= HLA-A43 =

Human leukocyte antigen serotype

- (MHC Class I, A cell surface antigen)
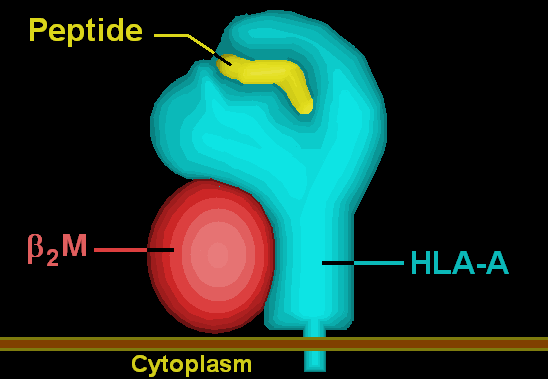
- HLA-A43

About
- Protein: transmembrane receptor/ligand
- Structure: αβ heterodimer
- Subunits: HLA-A*4301, β_{2}-microglobulin
- Older names: A10

Subtypes
Subtype	allele	Available structures
A43	*4301	
{{{cNick2}}}	*43{{{cAllele2}}}	
{{{cNick3}}}	*43{{{cAllele3}}}	
{{{cNick4}}}	*43{{{cAllele4}}}	
- Alleles link-out to IMGT/HLA database at EBI

HLA-A43 (A43) is a human leukocyte antigen serotype within HLA-A serotype group. The serotype is determined by the antibody recognition of α^{43} subset of HLA-A α-chains. For A43, the alpha "A" chain are encoded by the HLA-A*43 allele group and the β-chain are encoded by B2M locus. This group currently is dominated by A*4301. A43 and A*43 are almost synonymous in meaning. A43 is a split antigen of the broad antigen serotype A10. A43 is a sister serotype of A25, A26, A34, and A66.

A43 is more common in Africa and SouthWest Asia. A43 is believed to have been formed by a single gene conversion between another HLA-A and the A*2601 allele..

== Serotype ==
A43 recognition of some HLA A*43 gene products
A*43	A43	A26	Sample
allele	%	%	size (N)
*4301	0	35	9

A43 serotyping is poor.

== Distribution ==
HLA A*4301 frequencies
		freq
ref.	Population	(%)
	South Africa Tswana	4.9
	South African Natal Zulu	3.0
	China Yunnan Han	1.2
	Zambia Lusaka	1.2
	Pakistan Karachi Parsi	0.6
	India North Delhi	0.5
	Zimbabwe Harare Shona	0.4
	Italy	0.01
	China Shanghai	0.002
