= Leapmotor B03X =

Battery electric subcompact crossover SUV

Overview
- Manufacturer: Leapmotor
- Model code: B03X
- Also called: Leapmotor A10 (China)
- Production: 2026–present
- Assembly: China: Jinhua, Zhejiang

Body and chassis
- Class: Subcompact crossover SUV (B)
- Body style: 5-door SUV
- Layout: Front-motor, front-wheel drive
- Platform: LEAP 3.5
- Related: Leapmotor A05 / B03; Leapmotor B01; Leapmotor B10; Leapmotor Lafa 5 / B05

Powertrain
- Electric motor: PMSM
- Power output: 94–121 hp (70–90 kW; 95–123 PS) (China); 174–194 hp (130–145 kW; 176–197 PS) (Global)
- Battery: 39.8 kWh LFP Gotion; 53 kWh LFP Gotion
- Range: 403–505 km (250–314 mi) (CLTC); 292–382 km (181–237 mi) (WLTP)

Dimensions
- Wheelbase: 2,605 mm (102.6 in)
- Length: 4,270 mm (168.1 in)
- Width: 1,810 mm (71.3 in)
- Height: 1,635 mm (64.4 in)
- Curb weight: 1,360–1,460 kg (2,998–3,219 lb)

The Leapmotor B03X, also known in China as the Leapmotor A10 (Chinese: 零跑A10; pinyin: Língpǎo A10), is a battery electric subcompact crossover SUV produced by Chinese automobile manufacturer Leapmotor since 2026.

It is positioned below the B10 as the smallest crossover from Leapmotor.

== Overview ==
Rear view

Interior

Images of the A10 were released in November 2025, and the model be revealed at the Auto Guangzhou. It is expected to slot below the B01 in Leapmotor's lineup. The A10 is a small crossover SUV and is expected to rival the Ford Puma Gen-E. The A10 will share the LEAP 3.5 platform shared with the B01, the B10, and the Lafa 5. Sales of the model began on 26 March 2026.

The A10 is the first model of Leapmotor's A-series and is set to launch in 2026. It will be joined by another model in the series that is also planned for a 2026 launch, but later than the A10's launch.

In Europe, The A10 will be sold as the Leapmotor B03X, which is also its model code.

=== Design ===
The design of the B03X shares elements with the B10 as well as the C10. Both the front and rear LED signatures were designed to look like smiley emojis. A black C-pillar is present and creates a floating roof effect. A LiDAR sensor is also present on the roof, as are flush door handles. The B03X has its charging port located at the front unlike previous Leapmotor B-series models that have the port at the back.

=== Features ===
The B03X's dashboard features an 8.8-inch digital instrument cluster and a 14.6-inch 2.5K-resolution central infotainment touchscreen, which are powered by a Snapdragon 8155P or a Snapdragon 8295P on higher configurations. The A10 is available with an optional ADAS system capable of semiautonomous driving in urban conditions, which uses a sensor suite consisting of one 128-line Hesai LiDAR, 3 mmWave radars, 11 cameras, and 12 ultrasonic sensors, and is powered by a Snapdragon 8650 SoC.

== Powertrain ==
The B03X is a battery electric vehicle available with two rear-wheel drive powertrain options. The base configuration is uses a motor powered by a 39.8kWh air-cooled LFP battery pack, capable of 403 km (250 mi) CLTC range and recharging from 30–80% in 30 minutes. Higher configurations are equipped with a 121 hp (90 kW; 123 PS) motor which is powered by a liquid-cooled LFP battery pack which can charge from 30–80% in 16 minutes and has a CLTC range of 505 km (314 mi). All variants have a top speed of 160 km/h (99 mph).

Battery		Power	Torque	Range	30–80% charge time	0–100 km/h (62 mph)	Top speed	Kerb weight
Type	Weight	Power	Torque	CLTC	30–80% charge time	0–100 km/h (62 mph)	Top speed	Kerb weight
39.8 kWh LFP Gotion/Zenergy	296.5 kg (654 lb)	94 hp (70 kW; 95 PS)	150 N⋅m (111 lb⋅ft)	403 km (250 mi)	30 mins	12.2 sec	160 km/h (99 mph)	1,360 kg (2,998 lb)
53 kWh LFP Gotion/Eve Energy/Zenergy	380 kg (838 lb)	121 hp (90 kW; 123 PS)	150 N⋅m (111 lb⋅ft)	505 km (314 mi)	16 mins	10.6 sec	160 km/h (99 mph)	1,460 kg (3,219 lb)

=== International version ===
Battery		Power	Torque	Range		30–80% charge time	0–100 km/h (62 mph)	Top speed	Kerb weight
Type	Weight	Power	Torque	NEDC	WLTP	30–80% charge time	0–100 km/h (62 mph)	Top speed	Kerb weight
39.8 kWh LFP Gotion/Zenergy	296.5 kg (654 lb)	174 hp (130 kW; 176 PS)	150 N⋅m (111 lb⋅ft)	345 km (214 mi)	292 km (181 mi)	30 mins	8.6 sec	160 km/h (99 mph)	1,360 kg (2,998 lb)
53 kWh LFP Gotion/Eve Energy/Zenergy	380 kg (838 lb)	194 hp (145 kW; 197 PS)	150 N⋅m (111 lb⋅ft)	435 km (270 mi)	382 km (237 mi)	16 mins	8.6 sec	160 km/h (99 mph)	1,460 kg (3,219 lb)
