= Graphsim Entertainment =

Videogame developer and publisher

- Industry: Video games
- Founded: 1991; 35 years ago
- Founders: Jeff Morgan; Trey Smith
- Headquarters: Dallas, Texas, United States
- Website: graphsim.com

Graphsim Entertainment was founded in 1991 as Graphic Simulations Corp. to develop and publish simulation games. Graphsim's first product was Hellcats Over the Pacific for the Macintosh. It was released in 1991 and developed by Parsoft Interactive.

== Description ==
The game's graphics engine was novel in that it rendered flat-shaded polygons over the entire screen area of a color Mac at native resolution. In 1993 Graphsim released the internally developed F/A-18 Hornet for Macintosh. Based on the eponymous McDonnell-Douglas fighter / attack aircraft it was set in a fictitious Persian Gulf theater of war and featured a detailed cockpit display. F/A-18 Hornet was one of the first simulation games to allow multiple players (four players) to fly together and compete over a local-area network (AppleTalk). It would become the first of a series of F/A-18 games. In 1995 F/A-18 Hornet 2.0 was released for Macintosh, which elevated the level of graphics complexity and simulation detail over its predecessor. In early 1997 Graphsim released F/A-18 Hornet 3.0 for both Macintosh and Windows PC, followed by F/A-18 Korea in late 1997. F/A-18 Korea was set in a fictitious future Korea war theater and featured support for 3DFx graphics cards. It garnered a score of 8.7 as reviewed by editors at GameSpot.com.

In addition to internal development of the F/A-18 Hornet series, Graphsim published for Macintosh a few notable game titles including BioWare's Baldur's Gate and Tales of the Sword Coast, Volition's Red Faction and Summoner, as well as Interplay's Descent 3. Graphsim also published Atari's Falcon 4.0: Allied Force for both Windows and Macintosh, as well as Laminar Research's X-Plane 8, X-Plane 9, and X-Plane 10 Regional.

In 2015 Graphsim Entertainment released FA-18 Hornet for iOS, which remains its only title currently in development.

== Games developed ==
Year	Title	Platform(s)
2003	F/A-18 Operation Iraqi Freedom	Windows

== Reception ==
Computer Gaming World in 1994 stated that "Hornet feels great", praising the game's authenticity but wondering if some inauthenticity with the autopilot and instruments would have made it easier to fly for beginners. The magazine concluded that "F/A-18 Hornet provides an eye-opening and eminently flyable simulation".
