= A10 – new European architecture =

Dutch architectural magazine published from 2004 to 2016

A10 new European architecture (ISSN 1573-3815) was an architectural magazine published in Amsterdam that relied on a network of correspondents throughout Europe. The magazine ran from 2004 to 2016. It often highlighted young practices and emphasized the establishment of connections between the various European nations.

== History and profile ==
A10 – new European architecture was founded in 2004 by architecture critic Hans Ibelings and graphic designer Arjan Groot. The first issue appeared in November 2004. The magazine was published by Boom publishers Amsterdam BV on a bimonthly basis. It had its headquarters in Amsterdam. One of the editors-in-chief was Indira van 't Klooster.

== Indexing ==
A10 is indexed by Design and Applied Arts Index.
