= A-10 Tank Killer =

1989 video game

- Version 1.5 cover art
- Developer: Dynamix
- Publisher: Dynamix
- Director: Damon Slye
- Designers: Jerry Luttrell; Damon Slye; David Selle
- Programmers: Lincoln Hutton; David McClurg
- Artists: Kobi Miller; Mark Brenneman; Cyrus Kanga
- Composer: Alan McKean
- Platforms: DOS, Amiga
- Release: DOS: NA: December 1989; Amiga: NA: 1990
- Genre: Air combat simulation
- Mode: Single-player

A-10 Tank Killer is a 1989 combat flight simulation video game for DOS developed and published by Dynamix. An Amiga version was released in 1990. The game features an A-10 Thunderbolt II attack aircraft. Following the success of Red Baron, version 1.5 was released in 1991 which included Gulf War missions and improved graphics and sounds. Several mission packs were sold separately. A sequel published by Sierra, Silent Thunder: A-10 Tank Killer II, was released in 1996.

== Gameplay ==
The gameplay consists of the player piloting an A-10 Thunderbolt II "tank killer" through various combat missions set in the Gulf War air campaign as well as a fictional European scenario. The player receives a mission briefing, has the opportunity to customize a weapon load-out before starting the mission, and is debriefed after the mission.

== Reception ==
According to Sierra On-Line, combined sales of A-10 Tank Killer and its sequel surpassed 250,000 units by the end of March 1996.

Computer Gaming World stated that "A-10 has much going for it" and gave it four stars out of five. The magazine recommended the game for those looking for quick fun, not "flight grognards" seeking realism. In a 1994 survey of wargames, the magazine gave the title three-plus stars out of five, liking the graphics, but noting the "very sensitive" joystick control. The DOS version of the game received 5 out of 5 stars in Dragon. Due to the violence level of A-10 Tank Killer, it has been placed on the "Index" in Germany and is not generally available to the public.

== See also ==
- Red Baron (1990)
- A-10 Attack! (1995)
- A-10 Cuba! (1996)
- Silent Thunder (1996)
- Falcon 4.0 (1998)
