= HLA-A10 =

Human leukocyte antigen serotype

HLA-A10 is a broad antigen HLA-A serotype. The ancestral A10 type is believed to be A*2601, which via gene conversion with other HLA-A alleles produced A*2501, A*3401, A*4301 and A*6601. A10 serotypes in general show a pattern of more recent expansion, for example A34 appears to have expanded from the Middle East, with linkage disequilibrium with B alleles into Austronesia, South Pacific, Philippines and as far north as Taiwan (where it is found in the Taiwan Ami and Yami tribal groups but rare in ethnic Chinese nor in Hong Kong Chinese). A*66 appears to have expanded from North Africa into the Middle East or Europe and A26 appears to have expanded to the Black Sea and, after the initial settlement from the southern West Pacific Rim peoples, into Japan. Whether this is a secondary migration from Africa or a re-expansion from within Eurasia is unclear.

Subpages for A10 serotypes
Serotypes of A10 HLA-A gene products
HLA-A25
HLA-A26
HLA-A34
HLA-A43
HLA-A66
