= F/A-18 Hornet 2.0 =

1996 combat flight simulator video game

- Developer: Graphic Simulations
- Publisher: Graphic Simulations
- Platform: Macintosh
- Release: 1993
- Genre: Combat flight simulator

F/A-18 Hornet 2.0 is a video game developed and published by Graphic Simulations for the Macintosh in 1993.

== Gameplay ==
F/A-18 Hornet 2.0 is a combat flight simulator involving the F/A-18 Hornet.

== Reception ==
In 1996, Next Generation listed F/A-18 Hornet 2.0 as number 67 on their "Top 100 Games of All Time", commenting that, "the detail in the worlds is very high, and the graphics are great."

F/A-18 Hornet ranked at number six on PC Data's list of Top-Selling Software for June 1996.
