= A-10 Cuba! =

1996 video game

- Developer: Parsoft Interactive
- Publisher: Activision
- Artists: Ron Dimant; Jon Galloway
- Composer: Paul Morton
- Platforms: Windows, Mac
- Release: 1996
- Genre: Flight simulator
- Modes: Single-player, multiplayer

A-10 Cuba! is a flight simulator computer game developed by Parsoft Interactive and published by Activision in 1996 for Windows and Mac. The game was a sequel to the Mac-exclusive A-10 Attack!. A third game in the series, titled A-10 Gulf!, was slated for release in 1997, but later cancelled.

== Gameplay ==
It features an A-10 Thunderbolt II on a mission to defeat guerrilla forces at Guantánamo Bay, Cuba. As in most war flight simulator games, the main objectives consist of defending an airbase, destroying ships, bridges, tanks or buildings and escorting other aircraft.

An A-10 flies down the runway at Mariana Grajales Airport, while two MiG-29's taxi out to intercept.

A-10 Cuba! was the long-awaited sequel to the original A-10 Attack! flight simulator. A-10 Cuba! had the same impressive flight model as its predecessor, but the graphics were much more detailed and thus required a computer with more power. Other improvements included tire smoke when landing or skidding, runway taxi-way lighting, the Air Combat Command insignia on most U.S. aircraft and an increased number of polygons (making objects appear more round than they appeared in A-10 Attack!). Weapon damage was also upgraded and ground vehicle physics were made to be more realistic. However, the Windows version lacked the comprehensive mission editor and map view available in both the Macintosh version and in A-10 Attack!.

A-10 Cuba! has four practice levels, Take off, Landing, Air to Ground, and Air to Air. Each training level takes place in the desert area of the game.

== Reception ==
Reception

Review score
Publication	Score
Macworld	4/5

The game received mixed reviews upon release. Its simple, but high performing graphics were praised while its documentation and features were found lacking. Macworld's Michael Gowan wrote that the game features "the best flight modeling of any Mac flight sim". Although he found the game somewhat inferior to F/A-18 Korea, he summarized that A-10 Cuba! "offers great gameplay, varied missions, and rough-and-tumble network play."

== See also ==
- A-10 Tank Killer (1989/90)
- A-10 Attack! (1995)
- Silent Thunder: A-10 Tank Killer II (1996)
