= Gotion =

Chinese battery manufacturer

Gotion High-Tech Co., Ltd.
- Native name: 国轩高科股份有限公司
- Type: Public
- Traded as: SZSE: 002074; SIX: GOTION (GDRs)
- Industry: Battery manufacturing
- Founded: 2006; 20 years ago (battery business)
- Founder: Li Zhen
- Headquarters: Hefei, Anhui, China
- Products: Lithium-ion cells and battery packs, battery energy storage systems
- Revenue: CN¥ 45.07 billion (US$6.3 billion) (2025)
- Net income: CN¥ 2.38 billion (US$330 million) (2025)
- Number of employees: 33,087 (2025)
- Website: en.gotion.com.cn

Gotion High Tech, usually known as Gotion, is a manufacturer of lithium-ion batteries headquartered in China. As of 2025, Gotion ranked fifth worldwide by the capacity of batteries installed in electric vehicles, with a 4.5% share.

The Volkswagen Group owns a 24% stake in Gotion and is the largest shareholder.

In 2026, Gotion and PowerCo (Volkswagen's subsidiary) agreed to form joint ventures to make LFP cells in Spain and Slovakia and cathode materials in Morocco.

== History ==
Gotion was founded as Hefei Guoxuan Hi-Tech Power Energy (later anglicized to Gotion) in 2006 in Hefei by Zhen Li. The company struggled financially for several years before the Chinese government began heavily subsidizing the country's lithium-ion battery industry in 2009. In 2015, it listed on the Shenzhen Stock Exchange via a reverse takeover of Jiangsu Dongyuan Electrical Group Co. The Volkswagen Group acquired a 24% stake in Gotion for $1.1 billion in 2020 and became its largest shareholder.

In 2022, it also listed in Switzerland on SIX Swiss Exchange, raising US$685 million.

=== Overseas expansion ===
Gotion has actively pursued expansion abroad. It currently operates factories in Göttingen, Germany; and Fremont, California. It has also announced factories in Big Rapids, Michigan; Manteno, Illinois; Kenitra, Morocco; and Valladolid, Spain. It has also purchased a 25% stake in InoBat Batteries, a Slovak battery manufacturer. In 2023, plans to build a plant in Green Charter Township, Michigan, garnered local opposition due to the company's ties to the Chinese Communist Party, leading to a halt of the project and subsequent lawsuits.

== Battery business ==
Gotion makes lithium-ion cells and battery packs for electric vehicles and stationary energy storage. Its cell products include lithium iron phosphate (LFP) and nickel manganese cobalt (NMC) chemistries.

The company also makes LFP cathode material in Lujiang, Anhui, and anode material for lithium-ion batteries in Wuhai, Inner Mongolia.

In the first half of 2026, vehicle battery systems accounted for about 81% of Gotion's revenue and energy storage systems for 13%. About two-thirds of total revenue came from China.

The company reported supplying batteries for selected Chery, Geely and Leapmotor models during that period. From January to October 2026, Gotion ranked fourth in China by the capacity of batteries installed in electric vehicles, with a 6.07% share.

== Alleged employment discrimination ==
In 2025, three of Gotion's employees at its factory in Fremont sued the company for wrongful dismissal and alleged that its leadership had routinely employed Chinese citizens without visas, made racist comments about non-Chinese workers, and harassed employees complaining about safety issues.
