= T03 =

T03 may refer to:

- Leapmotor T03, an electric city car
- Tuba City Airport, a public-use airport in Arizona, United States, coded FAA LID T03
