= Plug-in electric vehicles in Italy =

Status and trends of electric mobility in Italy

Since 2017, the electric vehicle (EV) market in Italy has transitioned from a marginal niche into a significant segment of the national automotive industry. The market's evolution has been characterized by an early phase of exponential growth (2017–2021), a period of stagnation influenced by energy costs and supply chain volatility (2022–2023), and a definitive structural rebound in 2025. As of 31 December 2025, battery electric vehicle (BEV) registrations reached an all-time high of 94,973 units. This recovery culminated in a record-breaking December 2025, where BEVs captured 11.1% of the monthly market—the highest share to date—following a surge in government-backed incentive applications.

The total circulating fleet of battery electric vehicles and PHEVs in Italy reached 365,091 units. Despite a 2.1% contraction in the overall automotive market in 2025, registrations of rechargeable vehicles reached a combined market share of 12.7%. BEV registrations specifically grew by 46.1% compared to 2024, achieving a record 6.2% annual market share.

Lombardy remains the regional leader in Italian EV adoption, accounting for nearly 30% of national BEV registrations. In Milan, car-sharing services were required to phase out gasoline-only vehicles starting in 2024 to comply with local environmental regulations.

== Timeline of adoption ==
Emergence (2017–2019): Characterized by early adoption and limited infrastructure, with market share remaining below 1%.

Initial Expansion (2020–2021): Despite the COVID-19 pandemic, the market quintupled in share as the first major national incentive schemes were introduced and mainstream models, such as the Fiat New 500, entered the market.

Stagnation (2022–2023): A combination of high electricity prices and the exhaustion of incentive funds led to a temporary dip in volumes, though market share remained relatively stable as the overall combustion engine market contracted.

Recovery and Growth (2024–2025): The introduction of means-tested "Ecobonus" vouchers (offering up to €11,000) and a surge in corporate fleet electrification drove registrations to their current peak.

New battery electric vehicle registrations in Italy (including PHEVs)
Year	Total BEV registrations	Market share
2017	2,022	0.1%
2018	4,996	0.3%
2019	10,566	0.5%
2020	59,946	2.3%
2021	67,500	4.6%
2022	49,536	3.7%
2023	46,642	4.2%
2024	64,500	4.2%
2025	94,973	6.2%

=== Top-selling models ===
The market in 2025 was dominated by Tesla and new entry-level international models.

Top 5 Best-Selling BEVs in Italy (2025)
Rank	Model	Units Sold
1	Tesla Model 3	7,114
2	Leapmotor T03	6,242
3	Tesla Model Y	5,676
4	Dacia Spring	4,813
5	BYD Seagull	4,563

== Government policy and incentives ==
In 2025, Italy transitioned from simple purchase subsidies to a mix of targeted vouchers and tax-based corporate incentives.

- Purchase Subsidies: The Ministry of the Environment and Energy Security (MASE) managed a voucher scheme in 2025 that offered up to €11,000 for low-income households scrapping older vehicles. Approximately 55,700 vouchers were utilized before the program's exhaustion.
- Company Car Reform: From 1 January 2025, the taxable value (fringe benefit) for company cars was adjusted to favor electrification: 10% of the standard amount for BEVs and 20% for PHEVs, compared to 50% for internal combustion vehicles.
- Tax Exemptions: BEVs remain exempt from the annual ownership tax (bollo) for the first five years nationwide. In regions like Lombardy and Piedmont, this exemption is permanent.

Under the EU's December 2025 "Automotive Package," Italy began preparing for a revised 2035 target of 90% emission reductions, allowing a 10% niche for vehicles powered by e-fuels and carbon-neutral biofuels.

== Charging infrastructure ==
The public charging network in Italy grew by 16% between late 2024 and late 2025, reaching over 70,000 public charging points nationwide by the end of 2025.

Installation was accelerated by the EU's Alternative Fuels Infrastructure Regulation (AFIR), which mandated fast-charging stations (≥150 kW) every 60 km along the TEN-T core road network by the end of 2025. Despite this, regional disparities persist; approximately 55-60% of all charging points are concentrated in Northern Italy.

== Public opinion and barriers ==
While adoption is rising, Italy continues to lag behind the Western European average (where some markets reached 20-25% BEV share in 2025). Key barriers include:

- Structural limitations: Many Italian residences are limited to a 3 kW peak power supply, making home charging difficult without electrical upgrades.
- Affordability: High electricity costs (averaging €0.30/kWh) and the upfront price of vehicles remain concerns for the middle class.
- Taxation: Industry groups like UNRAE have criticized the lack of a full structural reform of corporate car taxation, which they argue is necessary to match the adoption rates of France or Germany.
- Used car market: Since Italy has a large second-hand car market, with used car sales outnumbering new car sales 2,1 to 1, the EV adoption is slower compared to other European markets. Almost all second-hand cars sold in Italy are ICE vehicles, therefore few cheap, second hand EVs are available to the average consumer.
