= Leapmotor C10 =

Mid-size crossover SUV

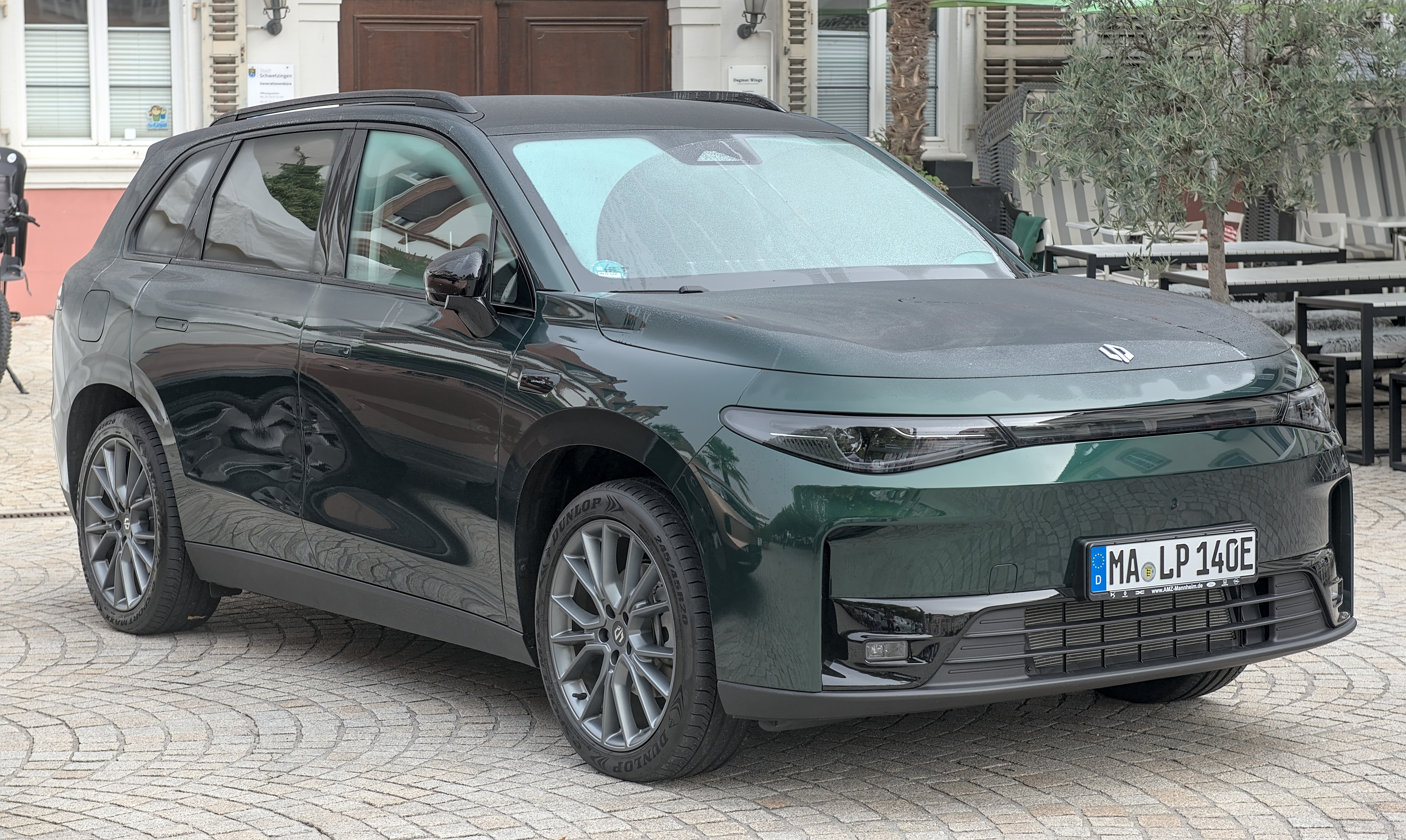

Overview
- Manufacturer: Leapmotor
- Production: 2024–present
- Assembly: China: Jinhua, Zhejiang; Malaysia: Gurun, Kedah (Stellantis Gurun Plant); Indonesia: Purwakarta (National Assemblers)

Body and chassis
- Class: Mid-size crossover SUV
- Body style: 5-door SUV
- Layout: Dual-motor, all-wheel-drive (EV); Rear motor, rear-wheel drive (EV); Front-engine + Rear-motor, rear-wheel-drive (EREV)
- Platform: LEAP 3.0
- Related: Leapmotor C16

Powertrain
- Engine: Petrol range-extender: 1.5 L H15R I4
- Electric motor: Permanent magnet synchronous
- Power output: REEV; 160 kW (210 hp; 220 PS) (RWD; 2025–); 170 kW (230 hp; 230 PS) (RWD; 2024–2026); 200 kW (270 hp; 270 PS) (RWD; 2026–); EV; 160 kW (210 hp; 220 PS) (RWD 69.9 kWh; 2024–); 170 kW (230 hp; 230 PS) (RWD 52.9–69.9 kwh; until 2025); 220 kW (300 hp; 300 PS) (RWD 74.9 kWh; until 2026 / RWD ProMax 81.9 kWh; 2025–); 446 kW (598 hp; 606 PS) (AWD ProMax; 2025–)
- Hybrid drivetrain: Plug-in series hybrid (EREV)
- Battery: REEV Hybrid; 28.4 kWh LFP CALB; 38.7 kWh LFP CALB (2026 Facelift); EV; 52.9 kWh LFP CALB (until 2025); 69.9 kWh LFP CALB; 74.9 kWh LFP CALB (until 2026); 81.9 kWh LFP CALB
- Range: 950 km (590 mi) (EREV)
- Electric range: 410–605 km (255–376 mi) (CTLC); 424–438 km (263–272 mi) (WLTP); 170 km (110 mi) (EREV) (CTLC); 145 km (90 mi) (EREV) (WLTP)

Dimensions
- Wheelbase: 2,825 mm (111.2 in)
- Length: 4,740 mm (186.6 in)
- Width: 1,900 mm (74.8 in)
- Height: 1,680 mm (66.1 in)
- Kerb weight: 1,940 kg (4,280 lb)

The Leapmotor C10 (Chinese: 零跑C10; pinyin: Língpǎo C10) is a mid-size crossover SUV produced by Chinese automobile manufacturer Leapmotor and sold in Europe by Leapmotor International. It is the first Leapmotor model to be designed for global markets, and is the first to enter the European market alongside the Leapmotor T03.

== History ==
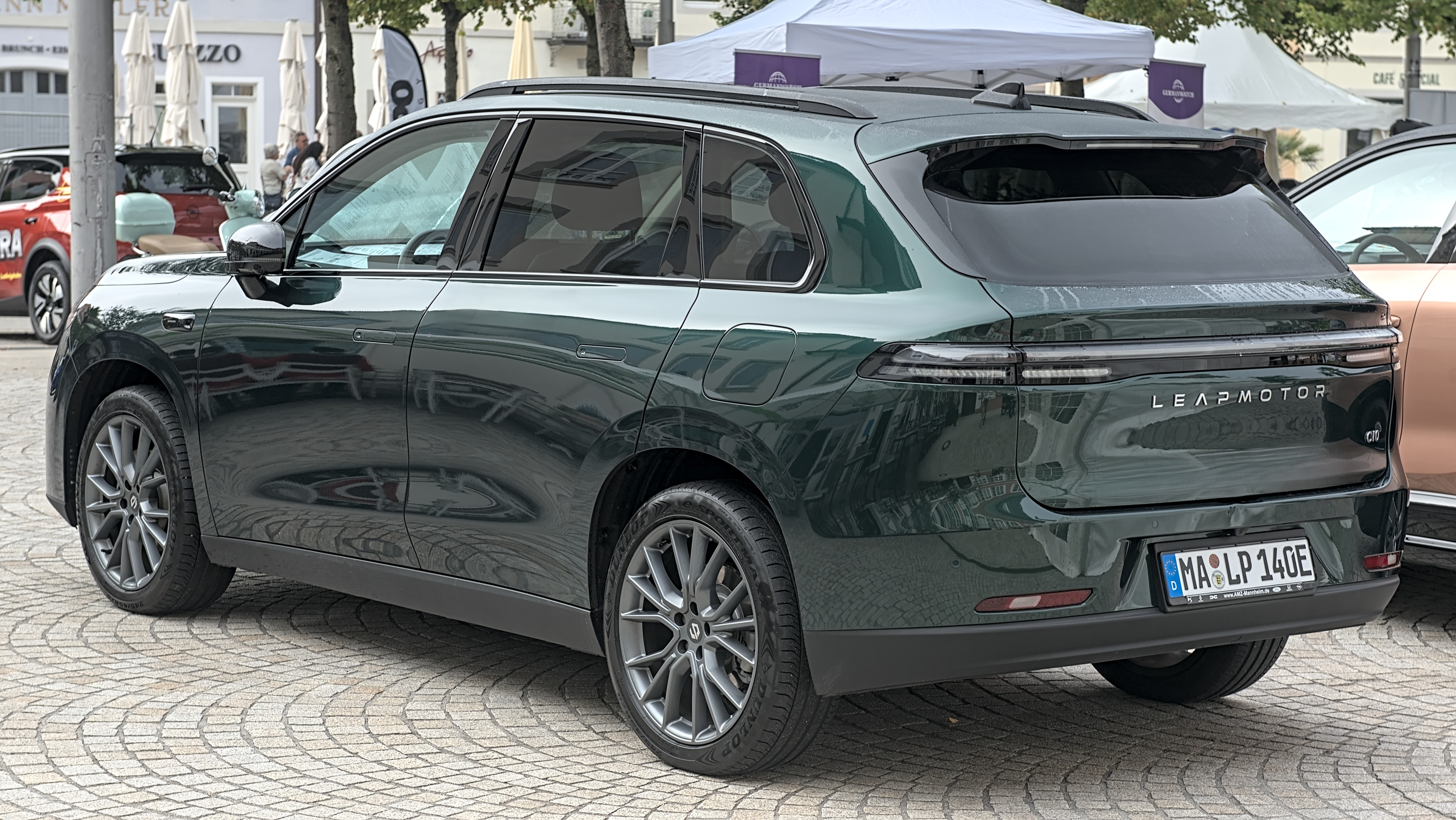
Rear view

The vehicle was first shown to the public at the 2023 Munich Motor Show. It was launched in China in March 2024. In September 2024, sales in nine European markets started. Unlike the lower-positioned Leapmotor T03, this model is imported to Europe instead of being produced locally, thereby incurring a 21% import tax.

== Equipment ==
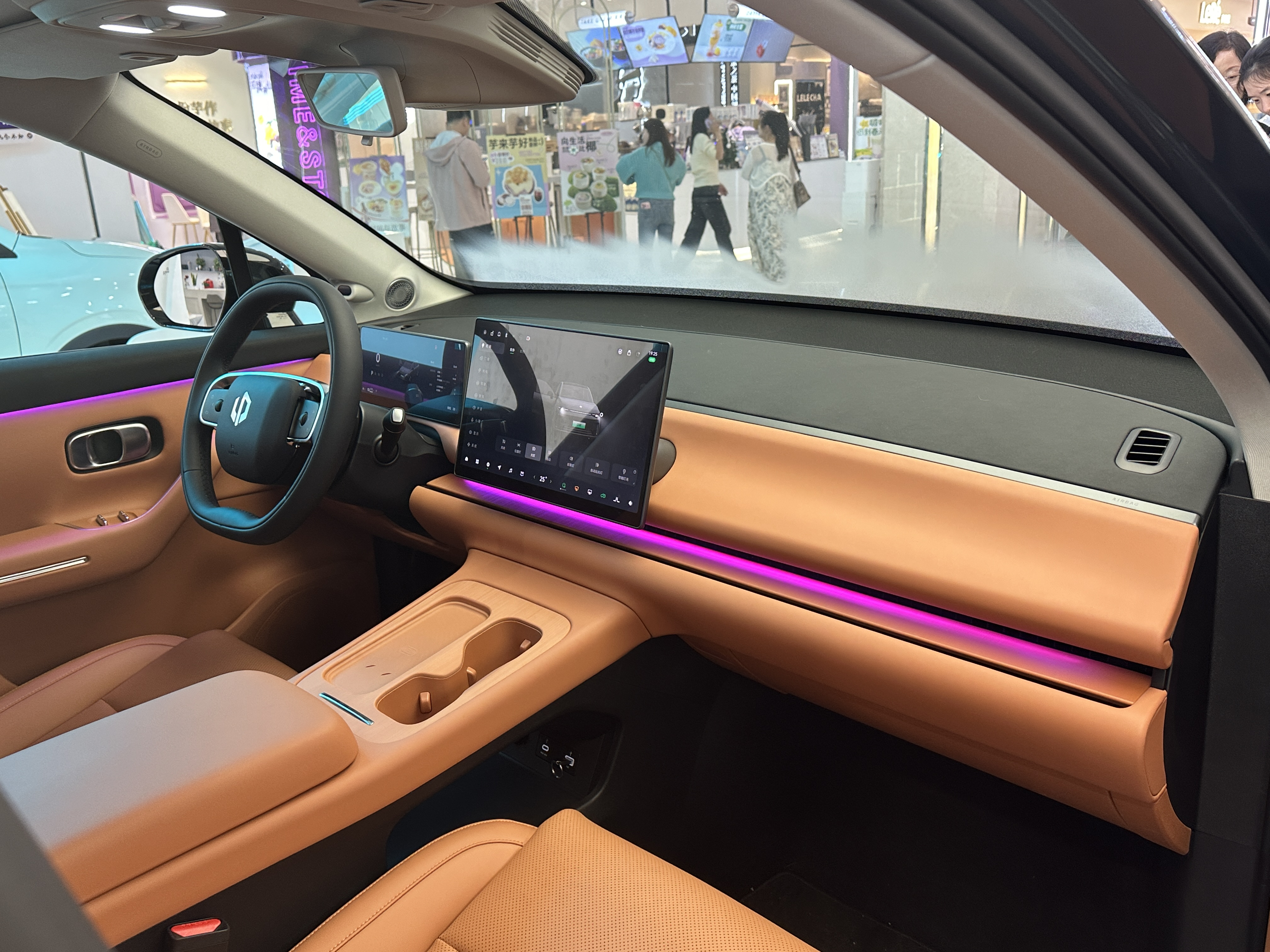
Interior

The interior features a 10.25-inch digital instrument cluster, and a 14.6-inch 2K central infotainment display. It is equipped with a 12-speaker 840W sound system and a 2.1 m^{2} (23 sq ft) panoramic sunroof. It has 435 L (15.4 cu ft) of trunk space, which expands to 1,410 L (50 cu ft) with the rear seats folded down. Leapmotor says that with the front and rear seats folded down, the vehicle can accommodate a 1.8 m × 1.2 m (5.9 ft × 3.9 ft) double bed.

== Powertrain ==
The C10 is available in either a range extended electric version, with a Seres-supplied 1.5-liter petrol engine and 28 kWh battery capable of 140 kilometres (87 mi) of CLTC electric range, or as a fully electric model with either a 52.9 kWh or 69.9 kWh battery pack, offering CLTC range ratings of 410 or 530 kilometres (250 or 330 mi), respectively.

== Leapmotor i C10 ==
The Leapmotor i C10 (stylized as i CI0) is a performance-oriented version of the C10 available exclusively in Germany. It was developed in collaboration with Opel tuner Irmscher. The exterior features larger wheels (possibly 21 inch wheels, the size is unknown), a more prominent rear spoiler, red accents on the front spiltter, side profile, and the center caps, and a stylized lowercase I badge below the rear light bar which also acts as a tail light. The only mechanical change was a new firmer suspension setup designed to increase handling. The i C10's power output is the same as the C10 AWD introduced at Auto Zürich 2025. It has a range of 438 kilometres (272 mi).

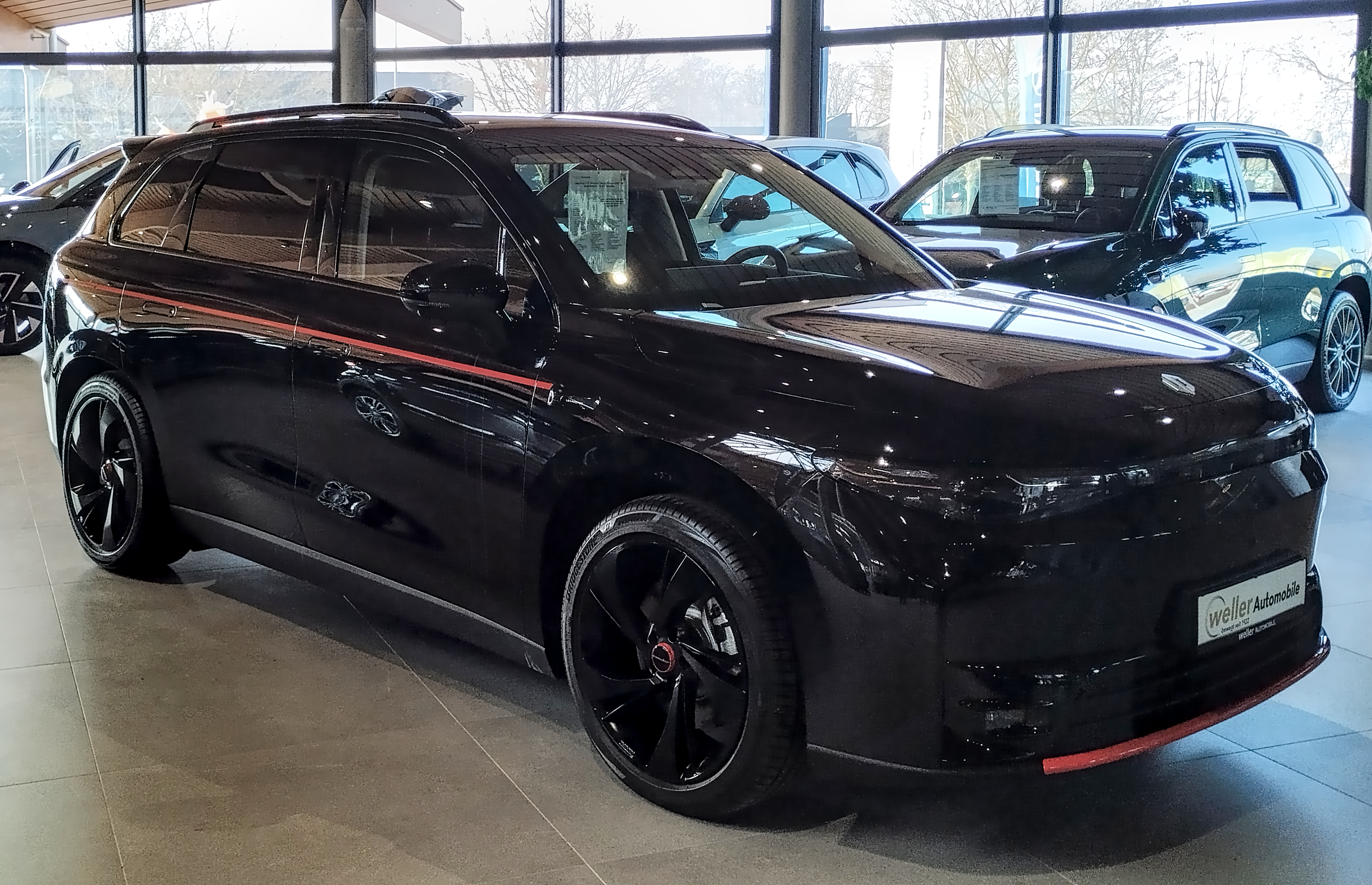
Leapmotor i C10

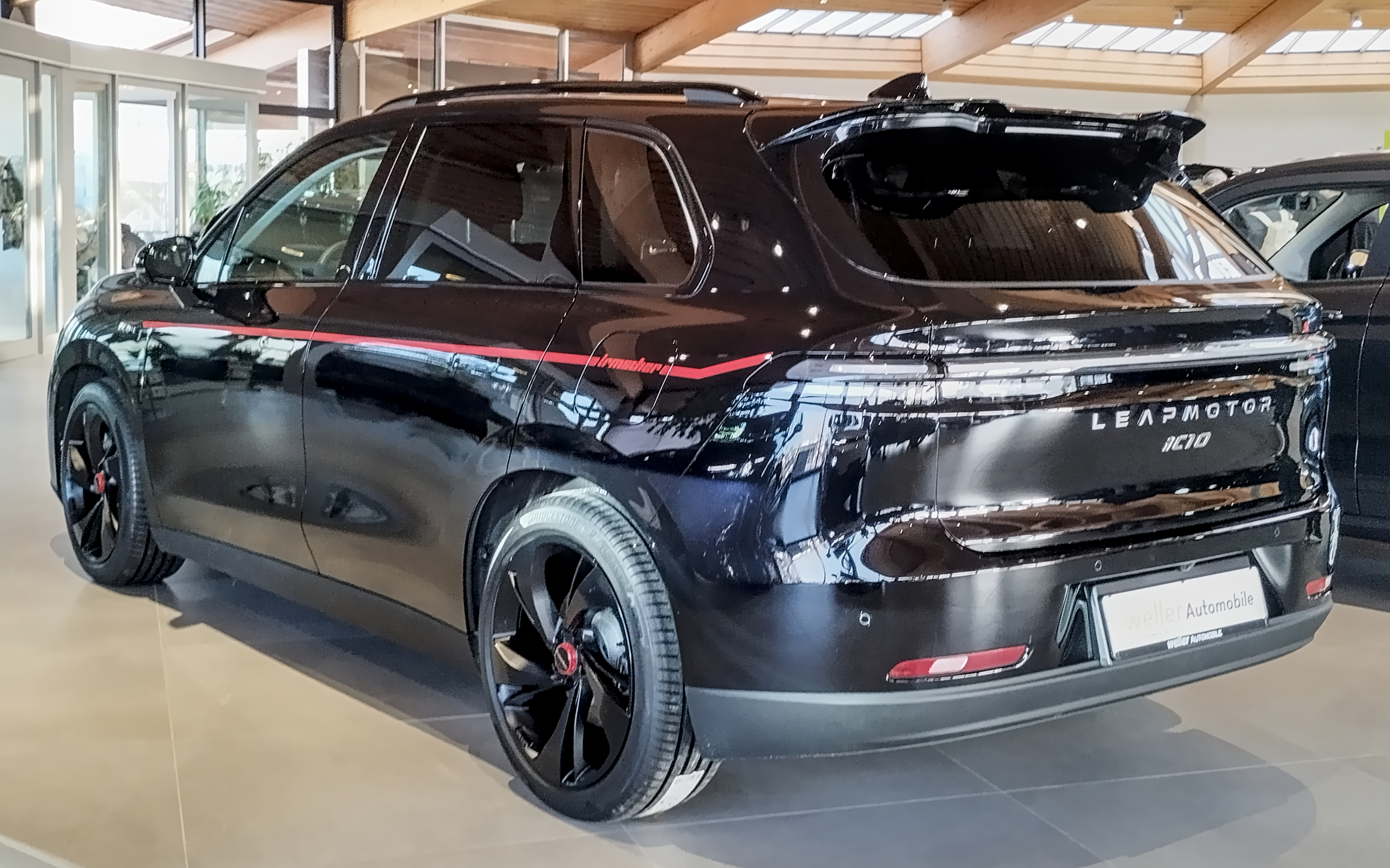
Rear view

== 2026 facelift ==
The C10 received a facelift on June 4, 2026.

Leapmotor C10 2026 facelift

== Markets ==
=== Australia ===
The C10 went on sale in Australia on 23 October 2024, as the first Leapmotor model to enter the Australian market, with customer deliveries commenced in November 2024. At launch, it is available with two variants: Style and Design, powered by a 69.9 kWh battery pack.

In March 2025, the EREV range extended electric version was introduced in Australia. Like the battery electric version, the EREV model is available with two variants: Style and Design.

=== Europe ===
The C10 is the first Leapmotor model alongside the T03 to enter the European market through the Leapmotor International joint venture in October 2024. It will be sold through existing Stellantis brands' dealership networks, initially in Belgium, France, Germany, Greece, Italy, Luxemburg, Malta, the Netherlands, Portugal, Romania, Spain, Switzerland, and the UK. It was initially available with only the BEV version, consisting of a 69.9 kWh battery pack and 218 PS (160 kW; 215 hp) motor, allowing for 420 kilometres (261 mi) of range on the WLTP cycle. It is equipped with a 6.6 kW onboard AC charger, allowing it to charge from 30-80% in 6.1 hours, or 30 minutes with a DC fast charger.

In January 2025, the EREV version was launched in Europe at the Brussels Motor Show, with deliveries expected to begin later that year in March. It uses the same motor, but has a 1.5-litre petrol generator providing 950 kilometres (590 mi) of range on the WLTP cycle.

An all-wheel-drive version was introduced at Auto Zürich 2025. The all-wheel-drive version produces 446 kilowatts (598 hp; 606 PS) and uses an 81.9 kWh battery pack, however the range has not been announced. The C10's DC fast-charging enables the battery to recharge from 30% to 80% in just 22 minutes.

=== Malaysia ===
The C10 was first previewed in Malaysia in September 2024, before it was launched in Malaysia on 16 October 2024 as the first Leapmotor model to enter the Malaysian market. Initially, it was available in the sole Design variant powered by the 69.9 kWh battery pack.

In February 2026, the Plus variant equipped with a larger 81.9 kWh battery pack was introduced and it is also available with the Night Edition styling package.

In July 2026, the C10 became locally assembled in Gurun, Kedah as the first Leapmotor model to be assembled at the Stellantis Gurun Plant. The CKD model is available with the same variants from the CBU model.

=== New Zealand ===
The C10 was launched in New Zealand on 20 November 2024, as the first Leapmotor model to enter the New Zealand market. At launch, the C10 was available in the sole Design variant powered by the 69.9 kWh battery pack.

In March 2025, the EREV range extended electric version was launched in New Zealand marketed as the Ultra Hybrid.

=== Singapore ===
The C10 was launched in Singapore on 30 October 2025 under distributor Cycle & Carriage, as the first Leapmotor model to enter the Singaporean market. It is available in the sole variant powered by the 69.9 kWh battery pack.

=== South Africa ===
The C10 was launched in South Africa on 15 October 2024, as the first Leapmotor model to enter the South African market. It is available as the range extended electric version (REEV) with two variants: Style and Design.

=== Thailand ===
The C10 was launched in Thailand on 28 November 2024, as the first Leapmotor model to enter the Thai market. At launch, the C10 is available in the sole unnamed variant, powered by the 69.9 kWh battery pack. In March 2025, the Style variant became available only in limited quantity and the unnamed sole variant was renamed to the Design variant.

== Safety ==
=== ANCAP ===
ANCAP test results Leapmotor C10 (2024, aligned with Euro NCAP)
Test	Points	%
Overall:	5 /5 stars	
Adult occupant:	35.87	89%
Child occupant:	42.81	87%
Pedestrian:	48.93	77%
Safety assist:	13.99	77%

=== C-NCAP ===
C-NCAP (2021) test results 2024 Leapmotor C10 530 Smart
Category		%
Overall:	5 /5 stars	90.2%
Occupant protection:		93.94%
Vulnerable road users:		69.45%
Active safety:		93.61%

=== Euro NCAP ===
Euro NCAP test results Leapmotor C10 Style (LHD) (2024)
Test	Points	%
Overall:	5 /5 stars	
Adult occupant:	35.9	89%
Child occupant:	42	85%
Pedestrian:	48.5	77%
Safety assist:	13.7	76%

== Sales ==
Year	China			Australia
Year	EV	EREV	Total	Australia
2024	57,036	17,935	74,971	
2025	100,717	25,132	125,849	579
