= Leapmotor =

Chinese car manufactuter

Zhejiang Leapmotor Technology Co., Ltd.

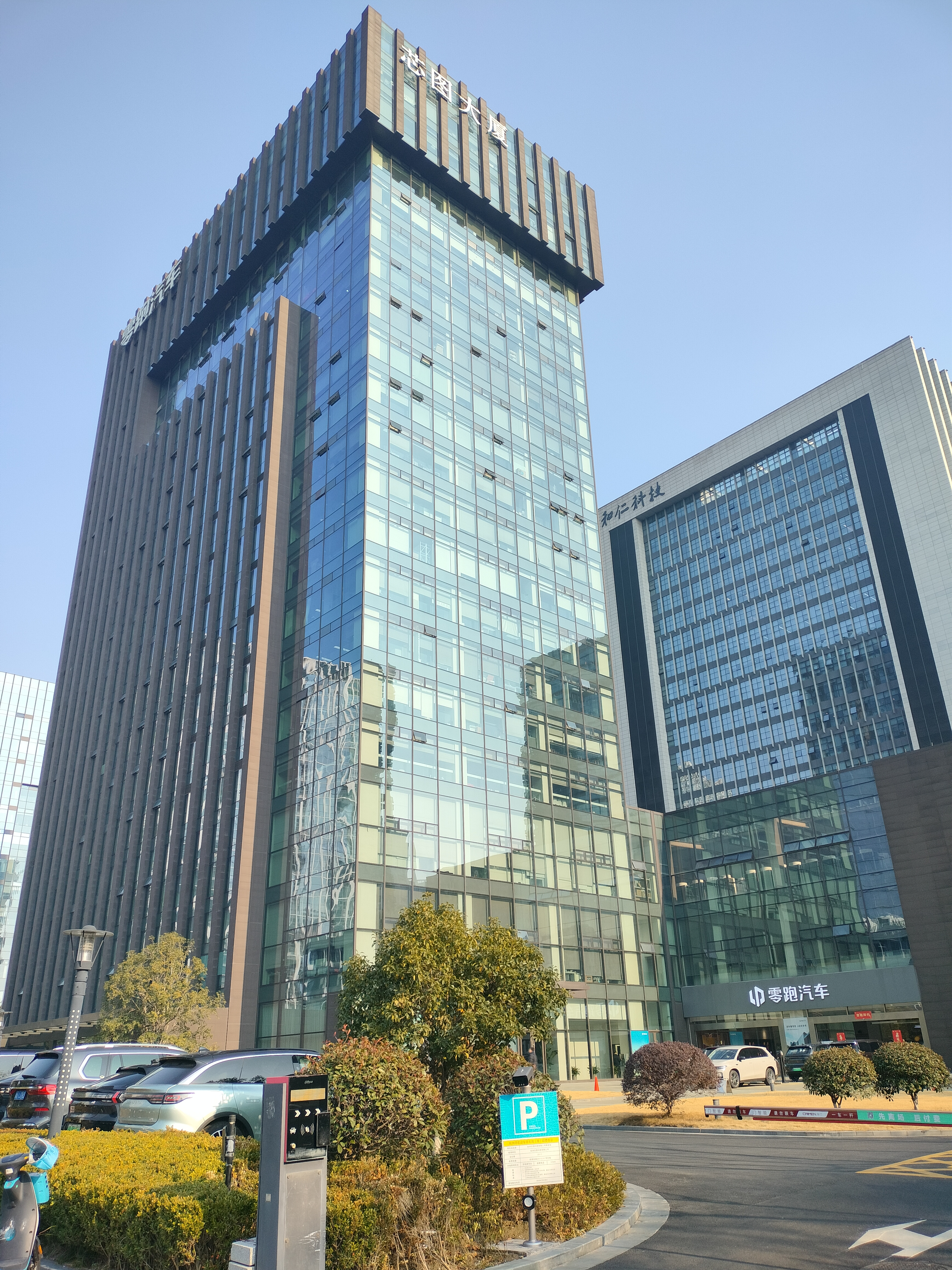
- Headquarters in Hangzhou
- Type: Public
- Traded as: SEHK: 9863
- Industry: Automotive
- Founded: December 2015; 10 years ago
- Founder: Fu Liquan, Zhu Jiangming
- Headquarters: Hangzhou, Zhejiang, China
- Key people: Zhu Jiangming (Chairman, President & CEO); Jun Xu (COO)
- Products: Automobiles
- Production output: ▲596,555 vehicles (2025)
- Revenue: ▲HK$ 18.14 billion (2023)
- Net income: ▲HK$ –4.57 billion (2023)
- Owner: The Single Largest Group of Shareholders (Zhu Jiangming and other holder, 22.56%); Stellantis (18.99%); FAW (5%)
- Number of employees: 9,310 (2024)
- Subsidiaries: Leapmotor International (49%)

Chinese name
- Simplified Chinese: 浙江零跑科技股份有限公司
- Hanyu Pinyin: Zhèjiāng Língpǎo Kējì Gǔfèn Yǒuxiàn Gōngsī
- Website: www.leapmotor.com

Zhejiang Leapmotor Technology Co., Ltd., trading as Leapmotor (Chinese: 零跑汽车; pinyin: Língpǎo Qìchē), is a Chinese automobile manufacturer headquartered in Hangzhou, China, specializing in developing electric vehicles. The company was founded in 2015, and sold its first vehicles in 2019. In 2023, Stellantis acquired a 20 percent stake of Leapmotor, and started to sell Leapmotor vehicles in parts of Europe in 2024.

== History ==
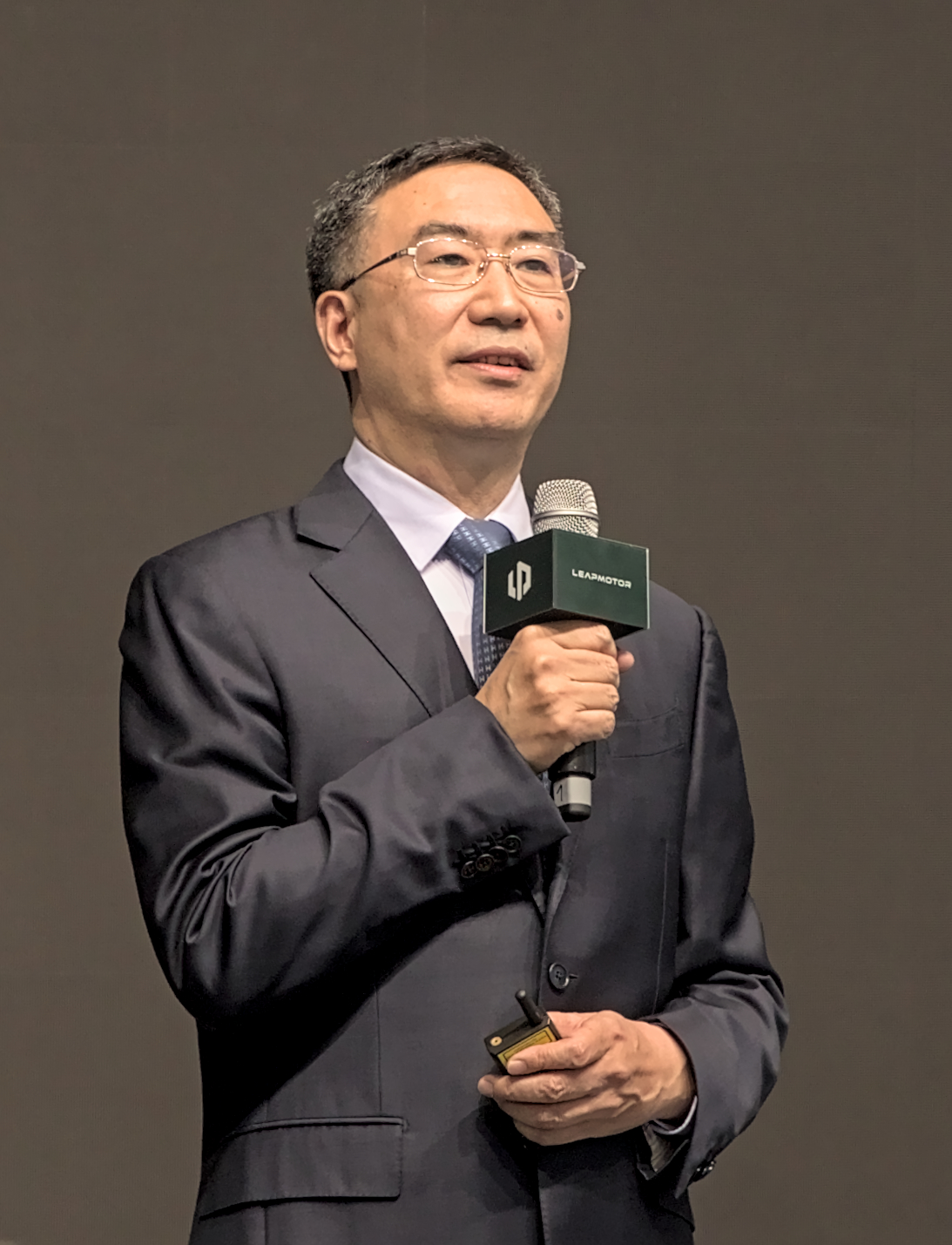
Zhu Jiangming in 2023

In December 2015, Dahua Technology, together with controlling shareholder Fu Liquan and director Zhu Jiangming, founded Zhejiang Leapmotor Technology Co., Ltd. Fu Liquan and Zhu Jiangming are also co-founders of Dahua Technology. In March 2017, the Leapmotor brand was officially launched.

In November 2017, Leapmotor released its first product, the Leapmotor S01. On June 13, 2018, at CES Asia, Leapmotor announced that the first domestically made artificial intelligence (AI) chip, dubbed "Lingxin 01", has entered the integration verification phase. The AI chip was co-developed by Leapmotor and Zhejiang Dahua Technology Co., Ltd (Dahua Technology), and was expected to be tested on vehicles in the second quarter of 2019. The Lingxin 01 is designed for autonomous vehicles, and features the capability of deep learning and leading computing power. The company vertically integrates high margin components by developing and building its own components such as electric traction motors, vehicle CPU, and LED lighting.

In October 2018, Leapmotor announced plans to roll out 3 new models over the span of 2018 to 2021, including the S01, the T03 and the C11, based on the S, T and C vehicle platform respectively.

In June 2019, the first product, the Leapmotor S01 electric 2-door coupe, is launched on the Chinese market. A prototype was shown at the 2017 Guangzhou Auto Show. At that time, the company had raised RMB 380 million in capital, and construction of the factory had started. The S01 was initially shown as the LP-S01 coupe earlier in 2018. The first deliveries of the S01 occurred in June 2019.

On 11 May 2020, Leapmotor officially launched its second mass-production EV, the Leapmotor T03 electric city car. The vehicle was launched with a total of 3 models, the price range after subsidy is 65,800-75,800 yuan (~US $9,280 – US $10,691). The Leapmotor T03 is equipped with a battery pack with a capacity of 36.5 kWh, and a 403 km (250 mi) NEDC cruising range.

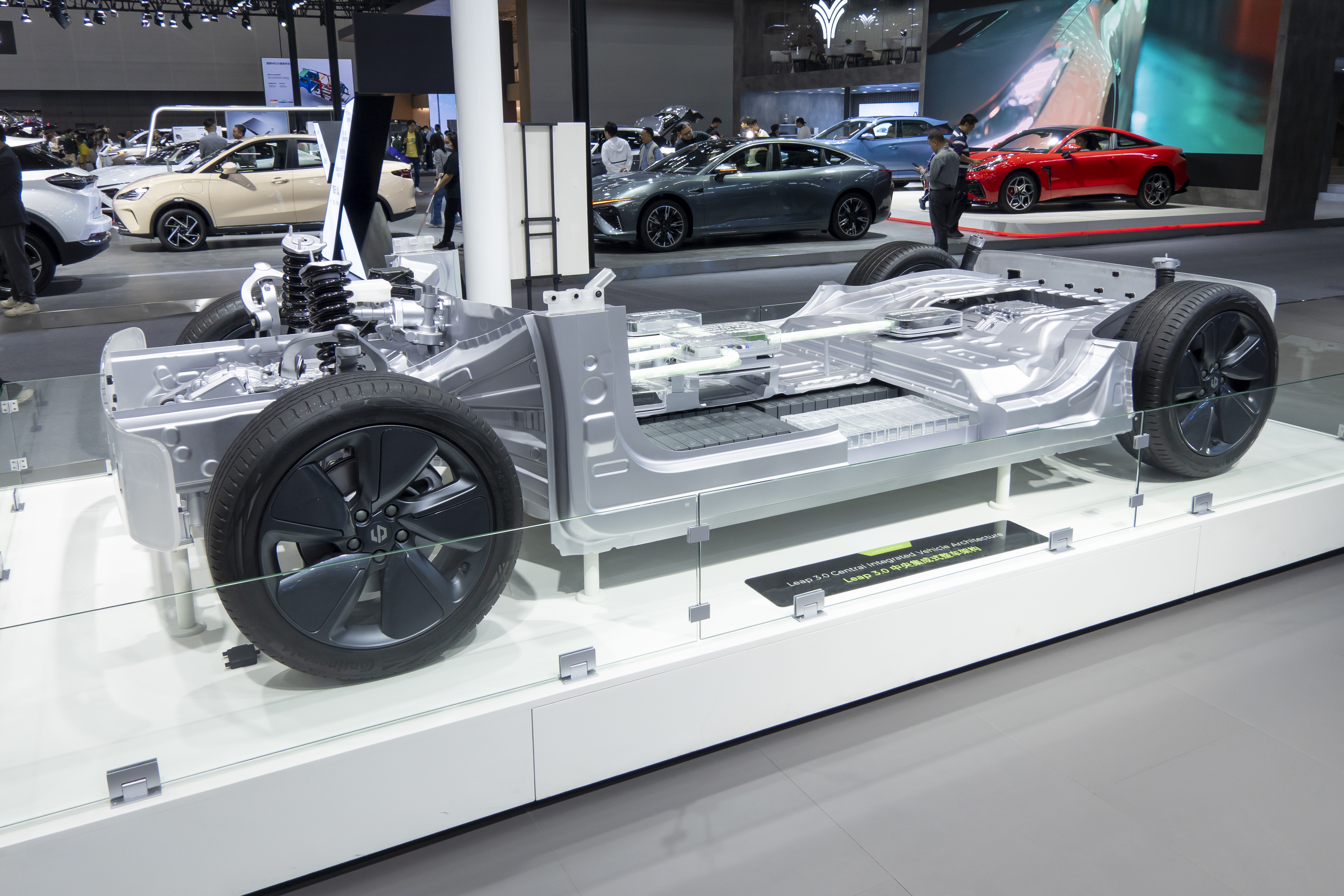
The Leap 3.0 Architecture platform showcased at the Auto Guangzhou 2023

In November 2020, Leapmotor officially launched the third mass-production EV, the Leapmotor C11 electric crossover, based on the 2019 C-More concept. The C11 is powered by dual electric motors jointly rated at 400 kW (536 hp) and 720 N⋅m (73.4 kg⋅m; 531 lb⋅ft) of torque. The Leapmotor C11 have around 600 km (373 mi) of driving range.

As of 2026, Leapmotor invests in over 50 companies for the research, development, materials, and manufacturing of its parts, many of which include the character "凌" (Líng) in their name. These companies currently develops and manufactures 65% of Leapmotor components in-house, with a target to reach 80%.

In June 2026, Leapmotor launched operations in Argentina with the B10 (USD 31,990, over 900 km range) and C10 models. The initial dealer network comprises 12 dealerships and 20 e-Expert Centers backed by Stellantis.

On 16 September 2026, Leapmotor announced its first ever plug-in hybrid powertrain system marketed as Multi-Mode Intelligent (MM-i) Hybrid Electric Drive, notable since the company has historically offered range-extender powertrains. Leapmotor says the system uses dual coaxial electromagnetic clutches to allow the generator motor to drive the wheels when the engine is off. This allows for a claimed 28% higher peak power output of 206 kW (276 bhp), 40% lower weight of 106 kg (234 lb), and 25% shorter length of 313 mm (12.3 in) than a conventional system. Leapmotor claims the series-parallel dual-motor system has a peak efficiency of 94.4%.

The company also announced its new Leap 5.0 Architecture platform, which will be put into production in 2027. The platform will do away with the traditional 12 volt battery powered on-board low-voltage network and instead use a 48 volt DC electrical system that takes its power from the high-voltage battery. The wiring harness will be reduced from the industry average of 1,500 metres to less than 500 metres. By combining the air conditioning unit with the powertrain that is positioned in the rear, 700 mm of additional cabin space is gained.

== Products ==
=== Current models ===
Image	Name	Introduction (cal. year)	Vehicle description
Cars
	T03	March 2020	City car, BEV
	A05/B03	July 2026	Subcompact hatchback, BEV
	Lafa 5/B05	September 2025	Compact hatchback, BEV
	B01	April 2025	Compact sedan, BEV
	C01	May 2022	Mid-size sedan, EREV/BEV
SUV
	A10/B03X	November 2025	Subcompact SUV, BEV
	B10	October 2024	Compact SUV, BEV
	C10	September 2023	Mid-size SUV, EREV/BEV
	C11	December 2020	Mid-size SUV, EREV/BEV
	C16	April 2024	Full-size SUV, EREV/BEV
	D19	October 2025	Full-size SUV, EREV/BEV
MPV
	D99	December 2025	Full-size MPV, EREV/BEV

=== Discontinued models ===
Image	Name	Introduction (cal. year)	Discontinued	Vehicle description
Cars
	S01	June 2019	2021	Sports car, BEV

=== Concept vehicles ===
Image	Name	Introduction (cal. year)	Vehicle description
	C-More	April 2019	Mid-size crossover SUV.

== Sales ==
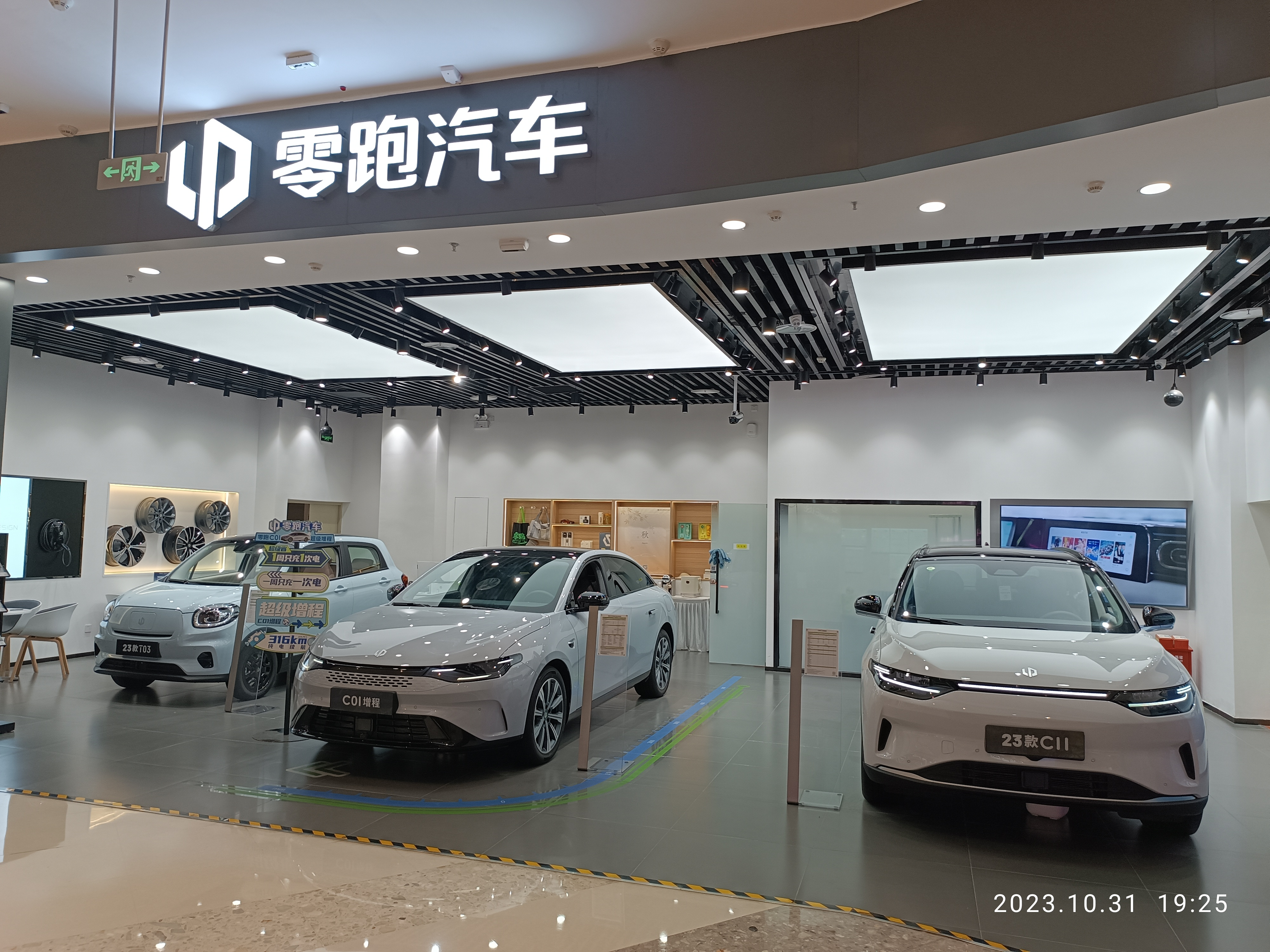
A Leapmotor showroom in Shenzhen

Year	Sales (units)
2019	1,000
2020	11,391
2021	43,121
2022	111,168
2023	144,155
2024	293,724
2025	596,555

== Partnerships ==
=== FAW Group ===
In May 2020, Leapmotor and state-owned Chinese automaker FAW forged a strategic partnership to jointly develop intelligent electric vehicle models. The agreement also involves the joint cooperation on R&D, manufacture, production and application of intelligent electric vehicle core parts, and the further research on the development of key basic technologies and the innovation of production measures.

In August 2023, FAW-VW, a joint venture between FAW and Volkswagen Group, entered discussions with Leapmotor to explore the potential acquisition of a platform for manufacturing new electric cars under the Jetta brand, specifically tailored for the Chinese market. In March 2025, FAW Group and Leapmotor signed the memorandum of understanding on strategic cooperation, under which the two parties will jointly develop passenger vehicles and collaborate on auto parts.

In April 2025 at the Auto Shanghai, Leapmotor chairman Zhu Jiangming revealed that the two companies have finalized their partnership and will jointly develop a model for the Hongqi brand targeting overseas markets. Mass production of the new vehicle is set to begin in the second half of 2026 at Leapmotor's Hangzhou plant. The new Hongqi model will be built on the same platform as Leapmotor B10 with both battery electric and range-extender powertrain.

In December 2025, Leapmotor announced that FAW Group would acquire 5% of its shares for 3.744 billion yuan. Following this acquisition, the stake held by Zhu Jiangming and other shareholders, who together form the single largest shareholder group, will dilute from 23.75% to 22.56%, while Stellantis' stake will decrease from 19.99% to 18.99%. The investment funds from FAW will be allocated in proportions of 50%, 25%, and 25% for research and development, supplementing working capital and general corporate purposes, and expanding the sales and service network while enhancing brand awareness, respectively.

=== Stellantis ===
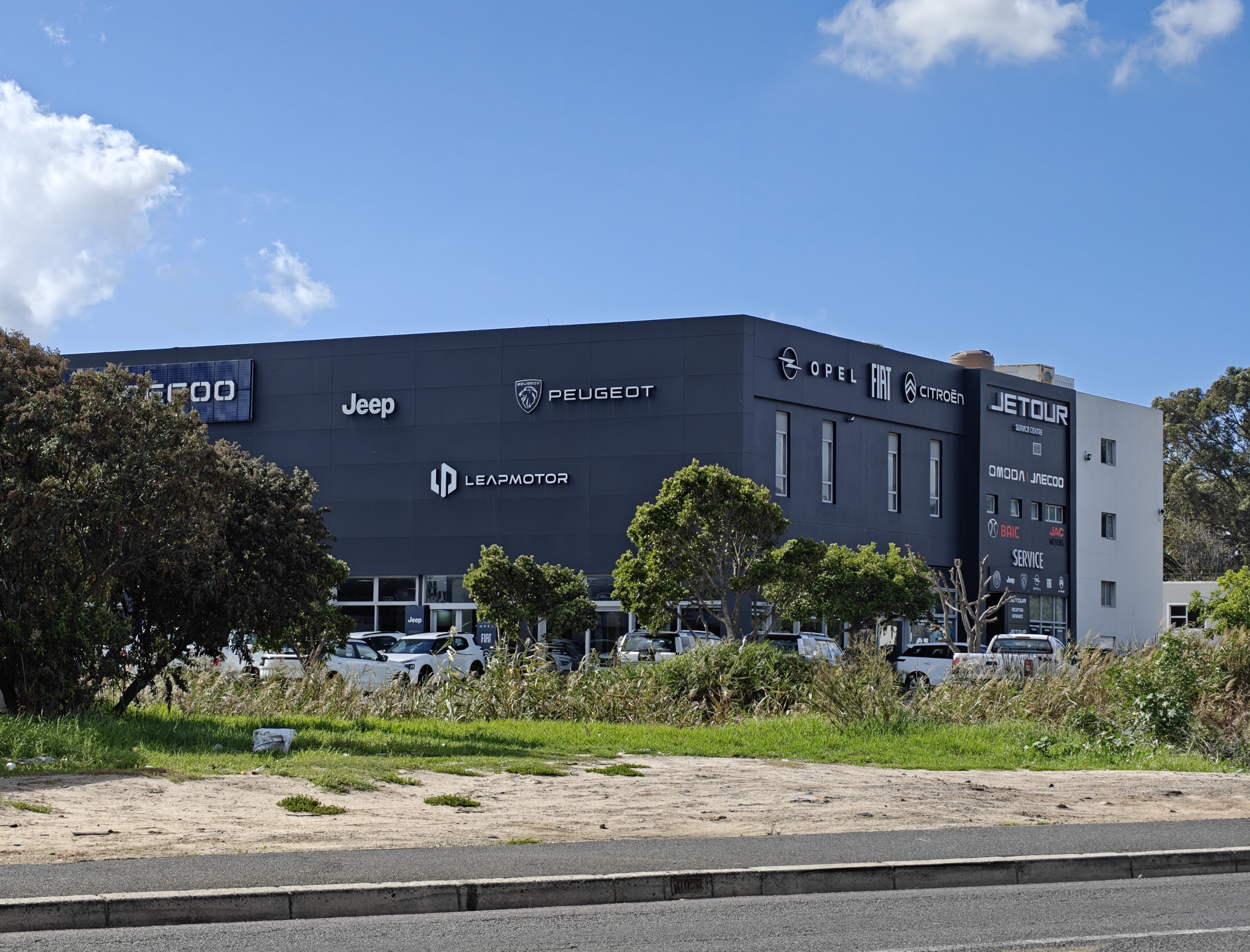
Leapmotor logo on a Stellantis service center in Cape Town

In October 2023, Stellantis acquired a 20% stake in Leapmotor for €1.5 billion. As part of the agreement, Leapmotor International, a joint venture 51% owned by Stellantis and 49% owned by Leapmotor, was established to handle distribution and production of Leapmotor cars outside China, supporting the company's expansion plans, notably in Europe.

In February 2024, Reuters reported that Stellantis was exploring the possibility of producing a Leapmotor model at its Mirafiori plant in Turin, Italy. In June, production of the Leapmotor T03 city car began at its plant in Tychy, Poland. In November, as Poland voted in line with EU tariffs on Chinese-made EVs, production of T03 in the country was already put under question. It was also reported that Leapmotor International and Stellantis have cancelled the plan of manufacturing the B10 model in Poland and decided to move its production to Slovakia and Germany. In March 2025, T03 production in Poland ended.

In May 2024, it was announced that Leapmotor International would launch the brand in Europe through Stellantis' dealer network from September 2024, covering Belgium, France, Italy, Germany, Greece, the Netherlands, Romania, Spain, Portugal and other countries. Starting from the fourth quarter of 2024, Leapmotor International will enter India and the Asia-Pacific, the Middle East and Africa (Turkey, Israel, French Overseas Territories) and South America (Brazil, Chile). Six new models will be introduced starting in 2025 with the T03 and C10 launched first. In the next three years, Leapmotor International will launch at least one new model every year.

In October 2025, it was reported that Stellantis was to market a rebadged variant of the Leapmotor B10 under the Opel brand for the European market. Stellantis was reportedly considering producing it in its plant in Zaragoza, Spain. As of January 2026, Stellantis is to start production of the B10 in one of its plants in Spain.

That month, it was also reported that Leapmotor's range extender technology was being considered for use in Stellantis vehicles in Europe, while European-market Leapmotor models could use existing Stellantis platforms.

In May 2026, Stellantis And Leapmotor announce to produce an Opel brand SUV based on Leapmotor B10 at Stellantis' Figueruelas plant, in Zaragoza, Spain. Stellantis also plans to transfer the ownership of its Villaverde plant in Madrid to Leapmotor International's Spanish subsidiary.

== Sponsorship ==
Starting in 2024, Leapmotor made a sponsorship with Zhejiang FC as the main front sponsorship for the 2025 season. For the 2026 season, the sponsorship will still stand.

Leapmotor made a sponsorship with Channel 5 in the UK for thrilling drama in 2026. It will advertise their TO3 city car, C10 SUV, B03X SUV and the BO5 Hatchback.

Leapmotor is also sponsors for The Louise Cantillon Show on Today FM in Ireland. It was made to build national awareness and to also to 'connect with Irish audiences'. Alongside the sponsorship, Leapmotor has multiple retail partners for test driving, including: Bright Airside (Swords, Dublin), Bright Motor Group (Navan Road, Dublin), Dan Seaman Motors (Forge Hill, Cork), Fitzpatrick's Garage (Naas, Co Kildare), Greenhall Motors (Buttevant, Co Cork), Joe Norris Motors (Navan, Co Meath) and Kenny Galway (Tuam Road, Galway).

In association football, Leapmotor has made a sponsorship with Palmeiras in the back of the kit of the men's, women's, and youth teams. It will expire in March 2028. Its debut has started against Junior Barranquilla for the Copa Libertadores da América.

Additionally, Leapmotor made a sponsorship with Universidad Católica. The sponsorship includes a 'Third Bench' experience that allows people to watch pitch side.

== See also ==
- Automotive industry in China
- New energy vehicles in China
- Nio Inc.
- XPeng
- HiPhi
- Li Auto
- GAC Aion
- BYD Auto
