= Leapmotor C16 =

Full-size crossover SUV

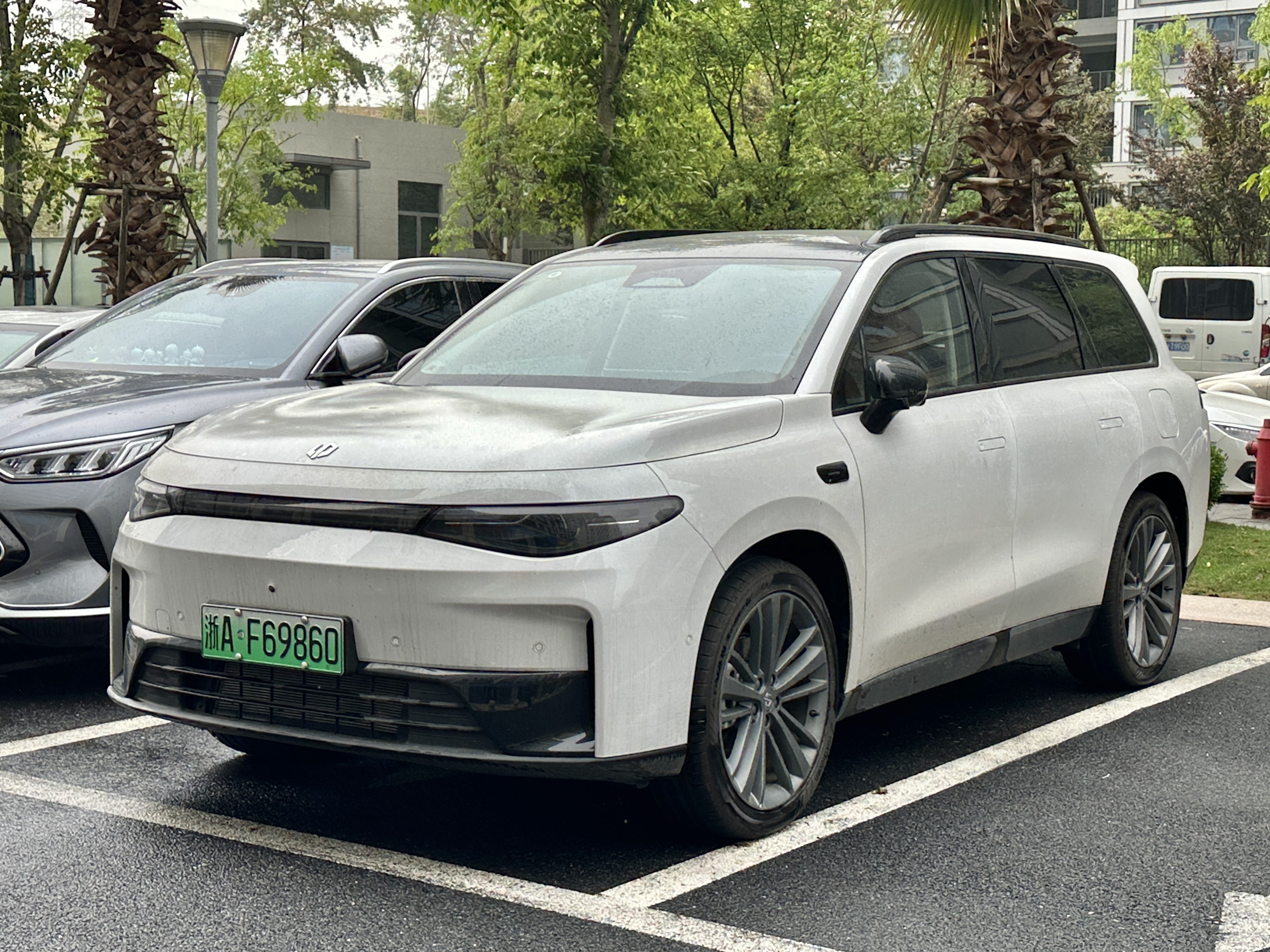

Overview
- Manufacturer: Leapmotor
- Production: 2024–present
- Assembly: China: Jinhua, Zhejiang

Body and chassis
- Class: Full-size crossover SUV
- Body style: 5-door SUV
- Layout: EV: Rear motor, rear-wheel drive; Hybrid: Front-engine + Rear-motor, rear-wheel-drive
- Platform: LEAP 3.0
- Related: Leapmotor C10

Powertrain
- Engine: 1.5 L H15R I4 (Generator)
- Electric motor: LEAP 3.0 Intelligent oil-cooling Syncronus motor
- Power output: 160 kW (215 hp; 218 PS); 170 kW (228 hp; 231 PS)
- Hybrid drivetrain: Plug-in Series Hybrid (EREV)
- Battery: EV: 74.9 or 81.9 kWh LFP; Hybrid-EREV: 28.4 kWh LFP
- Electric range: 301–630 km (187–391 mi) (CTLC); 310–580 km (193–360 mi); Up to 424 km (263 mi)

Dimensions
- Wheelbase: 2,825 mm (111.2 in)
- Length: 4,915 mm (193.5 in)
- Width: 1,905 mm (75.0 in)
- Height: 1,770 mm (69.7 in)
- Curb weight: 2,125–2,195 kg (4,685–4,839 lb)

The Leapmotor C16 (Chinese: 零跑C16; pinyin: Língpǎo C16; stylized as CI6) is a full-size crossover SUV produced by Chinese automobile manufacturer Leapmotor.

== Overview ==
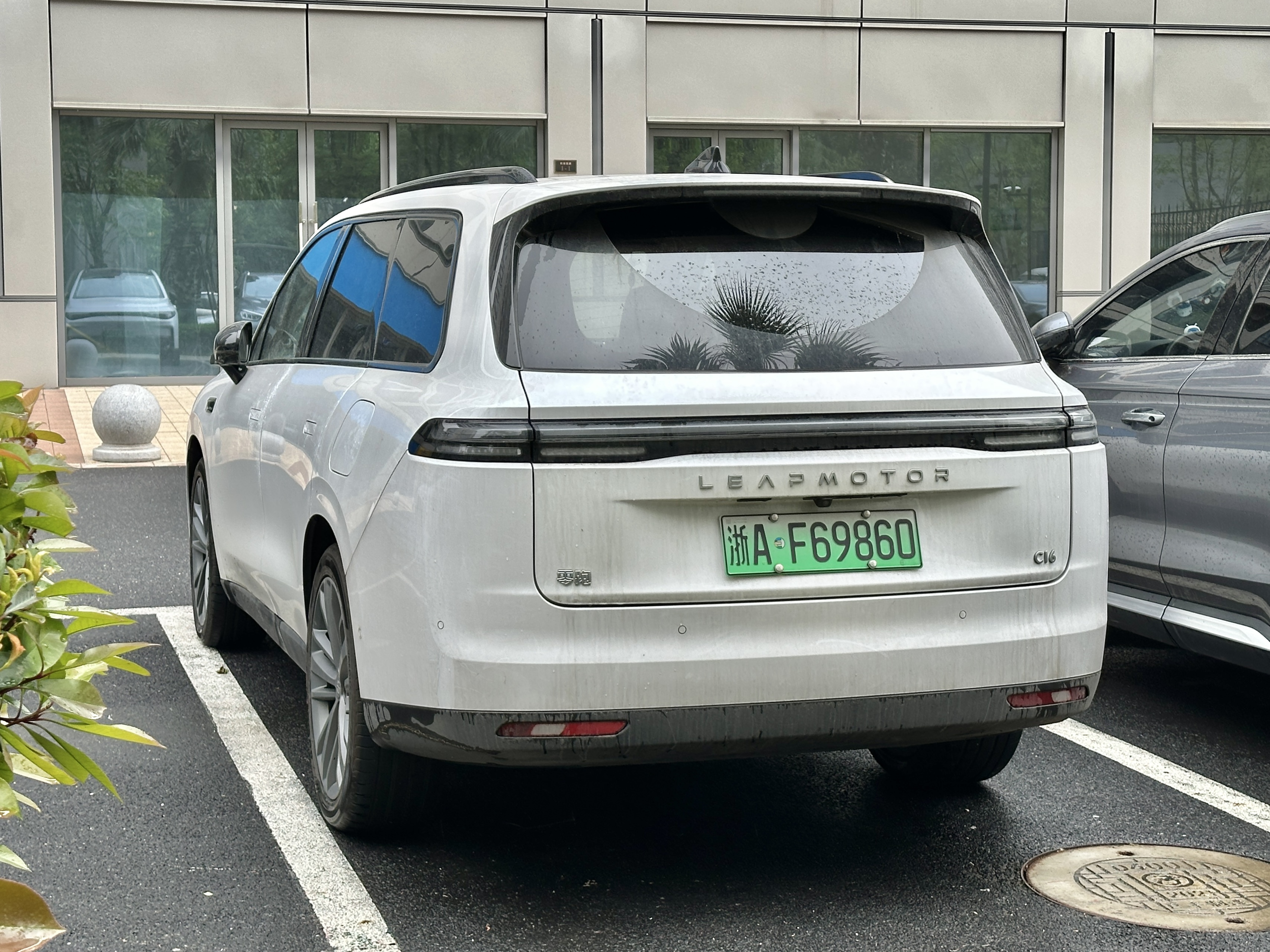
Rear view

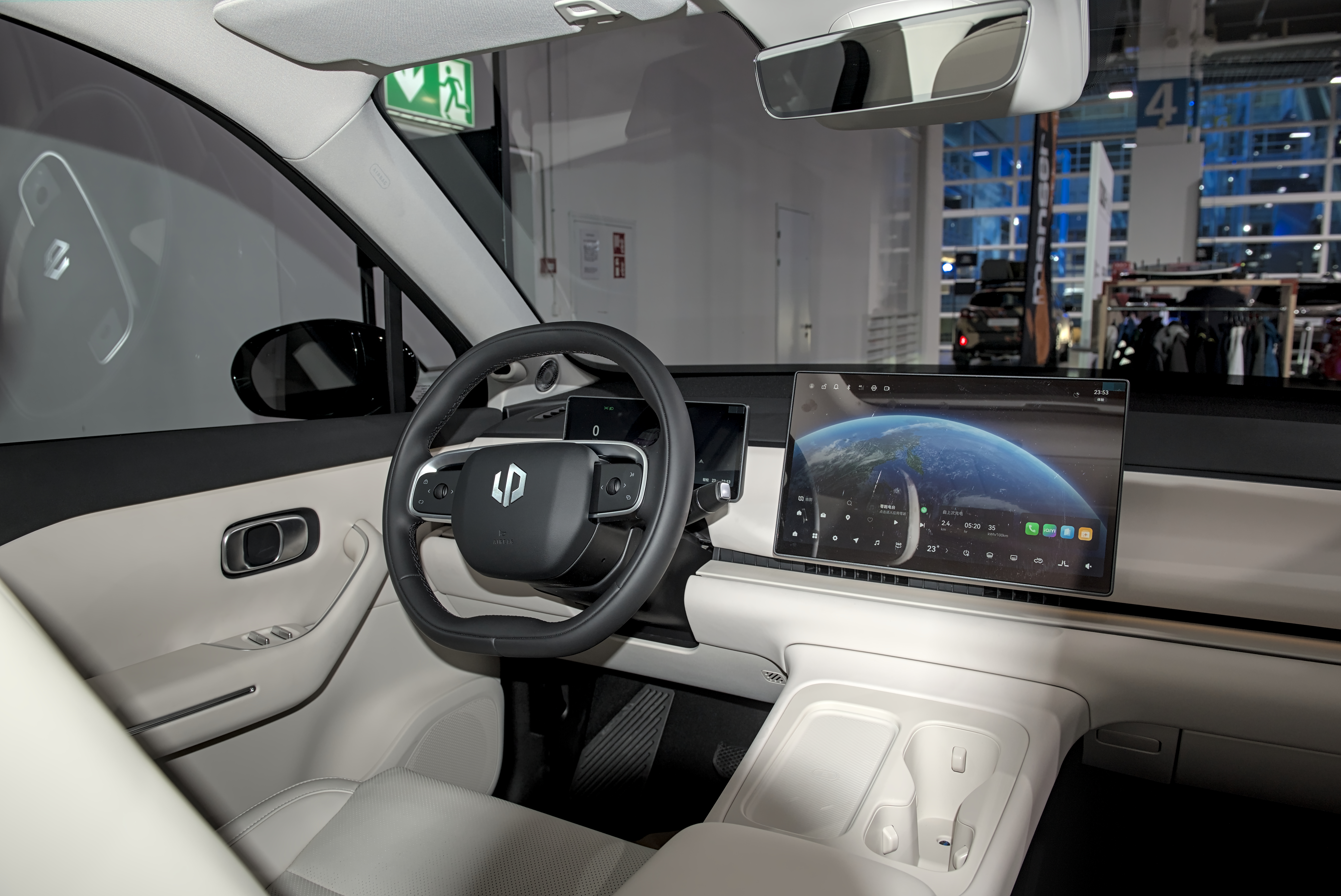
Interior

In April 2024, during the international auto show in Beijing, the premiere of the third, largest SUV in the Leapmotor offer took place, which is a response to, among others, the products of the company Li Auto. The C16 was created as an enlarged version of the C10 model presented a year ago, sharing the characteristic angular proportions and styling of the front part of the body. To distinguish it, the C16 received a longer wheelbase, a longer body and a more shapely shaped rear part of the body.

The passenger compartment has been designed in a minimalist aesthetic with dominant light-colored finishing materials, led by a 14.6-inch touchscreen multimedia system in the center of the dashboard. In addition, a display with digital clocks is located in front of the driver, while a drop-down 15.6-inch screen is provided for the rear passengers. The manufacturer also used a 21-speaker audio system, while the angular passenger cabin allowed for the transport of up to 6 passengers in a 2+2+2 seating arrangement.

== Specifications ==
Like other models in the Leapmotor range, the C16 was created with two types of drives in mind: Battery Electric (BEV) and Extended Range Electric (EREV). The C16 was initially launched as a BEV with 288 hp motor allowing for a maximum speed of up to 160 km/h, and a 67 kWh battery with up to 520 kilometers of range on the Chinese CLTC test cycle. The EREV variant has the same battery and 228 hp motor with an added 1.5-liter petrol engine. This extends the range by up to 230 kilometers. As with all EREV vehicles the petrol engine exclusively generates electricity which in turn drives the electric powertrain.

== 2026 facelift ==
The C16 received a facelift on June 16, 2026.

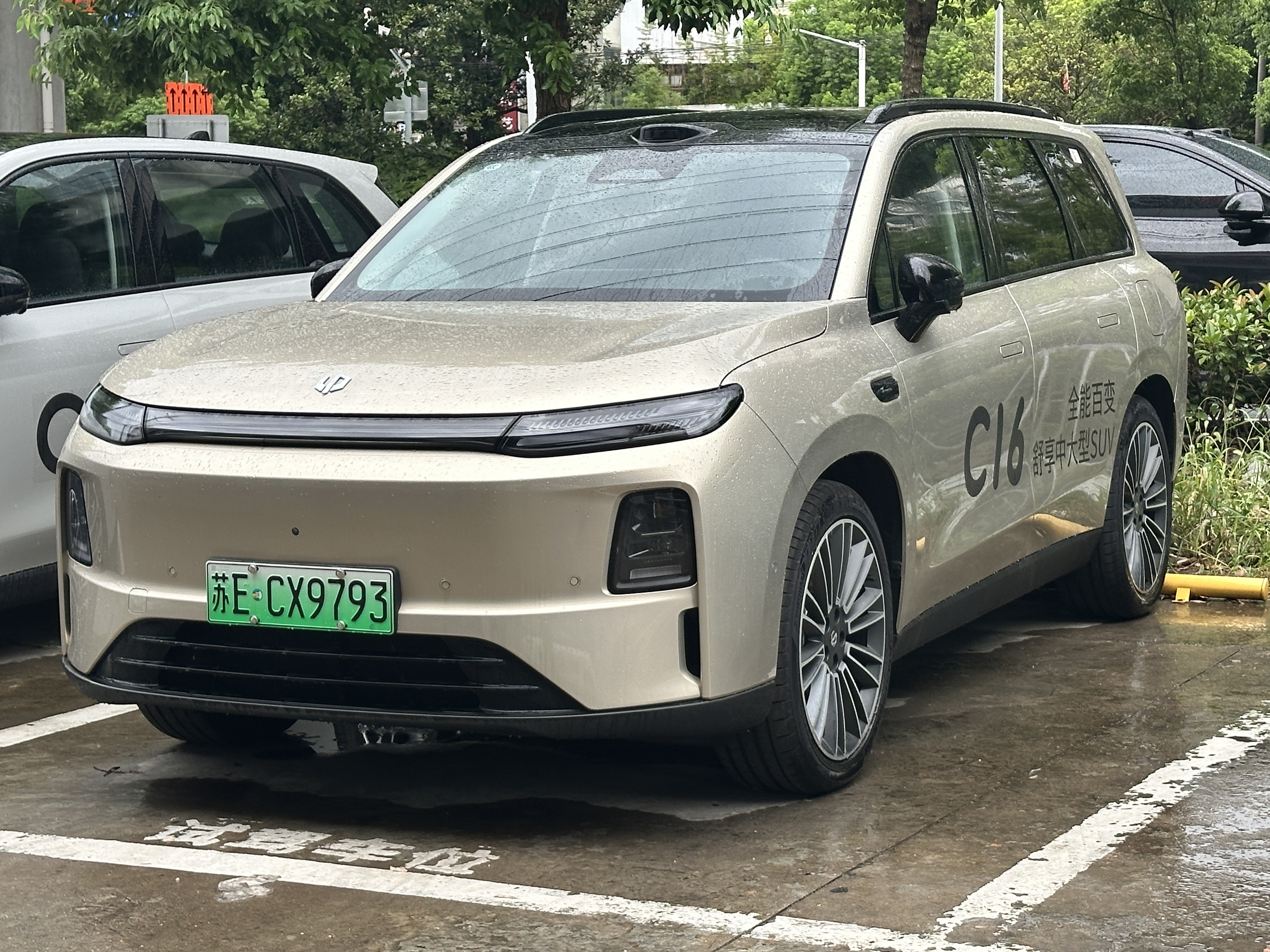
Leapmotor C16 2026 facelift

== Sales ==
Year	China		
Year	EV	EREV	Total
2024	17,987	25,541	43,528
2025	32,685	36,226	68,911
