= Leapmotor C11 =

Mid-size crossover SUV

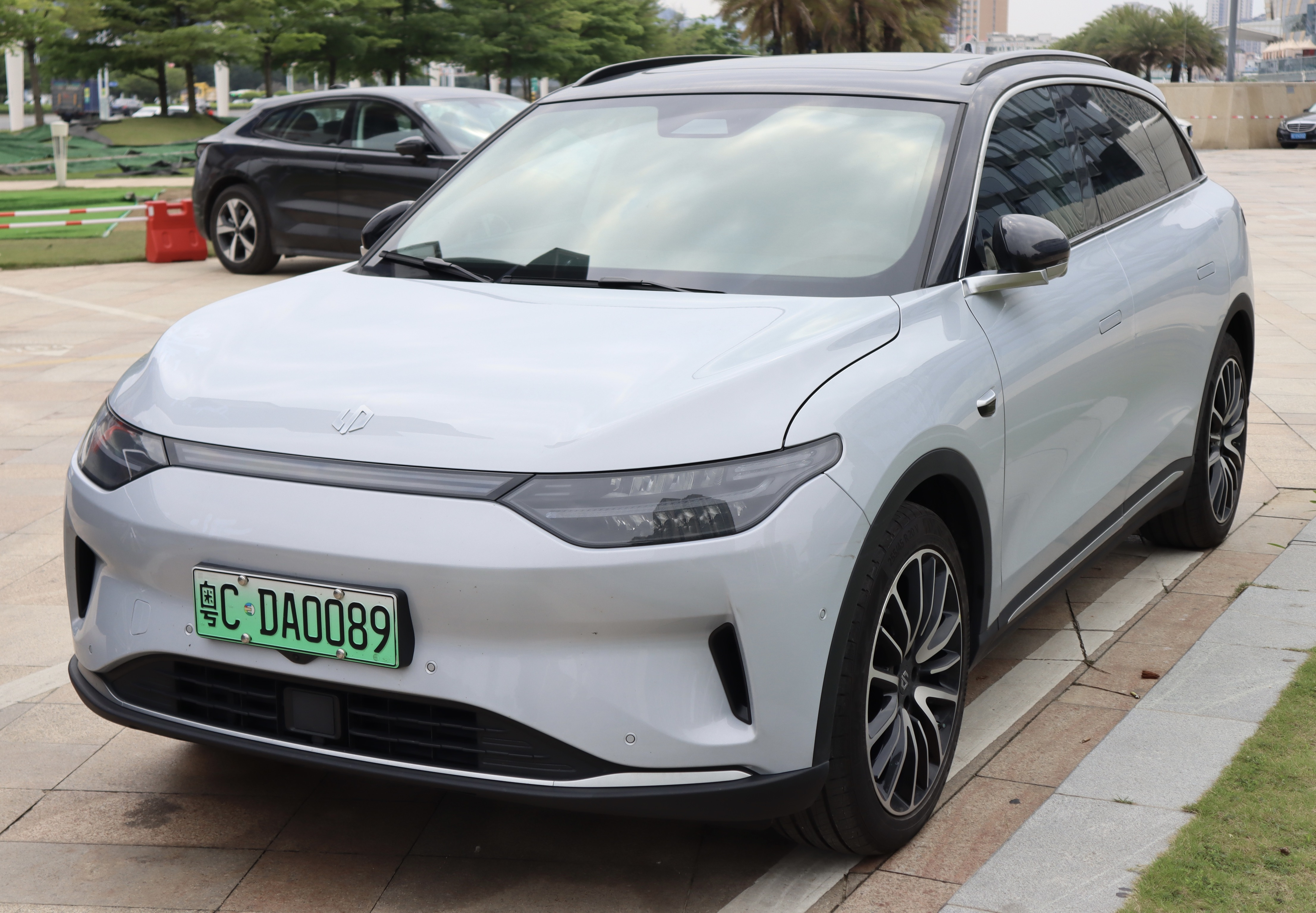

Overview
- Manufacturer: Leapmotor
- Production: 2021–present
- Model years: 2022–present
- Assembly: China: Jinhua, Zhejiang

Body and chassis
- Class: Mid-size crossover SUV
- Body style: 5-door SUV
- Layout: Rear-motor, rear-wheel-drive (EV); Dual-motor, all-wheel-drive (EV); Front-engine, front-motor, rear-wheel drive (EREV)
- Related: Leapmotor C01

Powertrain
- Engine: Petrol range extender: 1.2 L DAM12TD I3 turbo
- Electric motor: Permanent magnet AC synchronous
- Power output: 200 kW (270 hp) (EV & EREV RWD); 220 kW (300 hp) (EV RWD); 400 kW (540 hp) (EV AWD)
- Transmission: Single-speed gear reduction
- Hybrid drivetrain: Range-extended electric
- Battery: 43.74 kWh NMC CALB; 78.5 kWh (EV MY2021–MY2025); 81.9 kWh (EV MY2026–)
- Electric range: CLTC: 170 km (110 mi) (EREV); CLTC: 580 km (360 mi) (EV, 2021–2025); 640 km (400 mi) (EV, 2026–)

Dimensions
- Wheelbase: 2,930 mm (115.4 in)
- Length: 4,750 mm (187.0 in); 4,780 mm (188.2 in) (EREV)
- Width: 1,905 mm (75.0 in)
- Height: 1,675 mm (65.9 in)
- Curb weight: 2,330 kg (5,140 lb)

The Leapmotor C11 (Chinese: 零跑C11; pinyin: Língpǎo C11) is a mid-size crossover SUV produced by Chinese automobile manufacturer Leapmotor in 2021. It is available with a range extender electric powertrain and as a pure battery electric vehicle.

== Overview ==
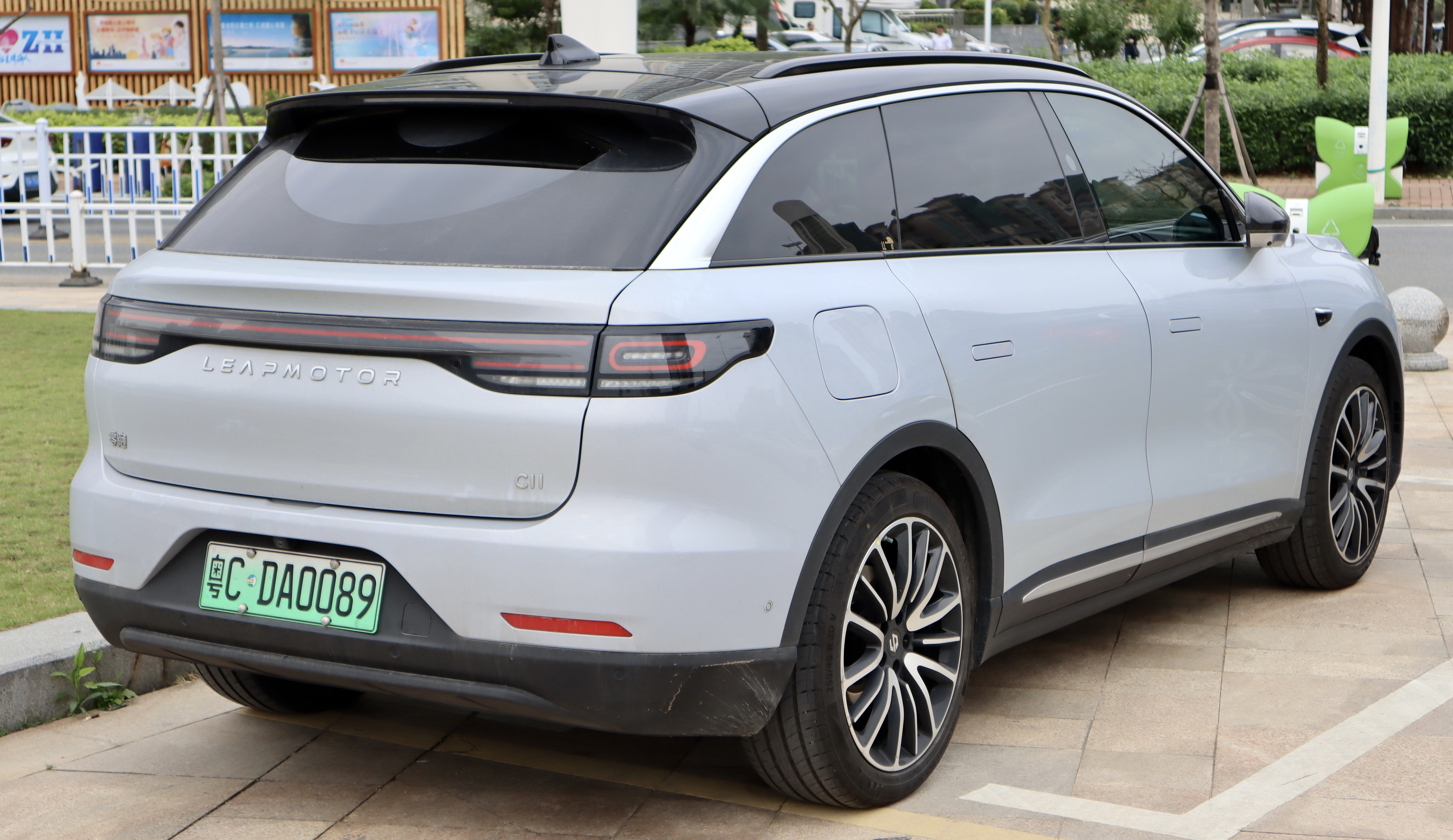
Rear view

The Leapmotor C11 was revealed at the 2020 Auto Guangzhou show in December. It is the third vehicle marketed by Leapmotor when it went on sale in the Chinese market in 2021.

The C11 uses a Qualcomm Snapdragon 8155 to run its infotainment systems. It is also equipped with the Lingxin 01, a chipset developed by Leapmotor that enables level 3 autonomous driving and self parking and combines usage with the Huawei Kirin A1 chip. Both chips enable the use of ADAS intelligent driving assistance. Additional features in the C11 include Bluetooth connection, face recognition, adaptive personalized adjustment, a smart air purification system, and has 12 cameras for a 2.5D 360-degree panoramic view.

== Powertrain ==
The range-topping version of the C11 EV uses a 90 kWh battery and has a power output of 536 hp (400 kW; 543 PS) from a dual-motor all-wheel drive powertrain. The NEDC range is 550 kilometres (342 mi).

=== Range extender ===
The C11 extended-range electric vehicle (EREV) was launched for the 2023 model year with an electric motor with a maximum power of 200 kW (268 hp; 272 PS). The Leapmotor C11 EREV is equipped with an NMC lithium-ion battery pack with a capacity of 43.74 kWh supplied by CALB, providing a CLTC range of 170 kilometres (106 mi) on pure battery power. It has slightly longer and taller dimensions of 4,780 mm (188.2 in) in length, and 1,675 mm (65.9 in) in height.

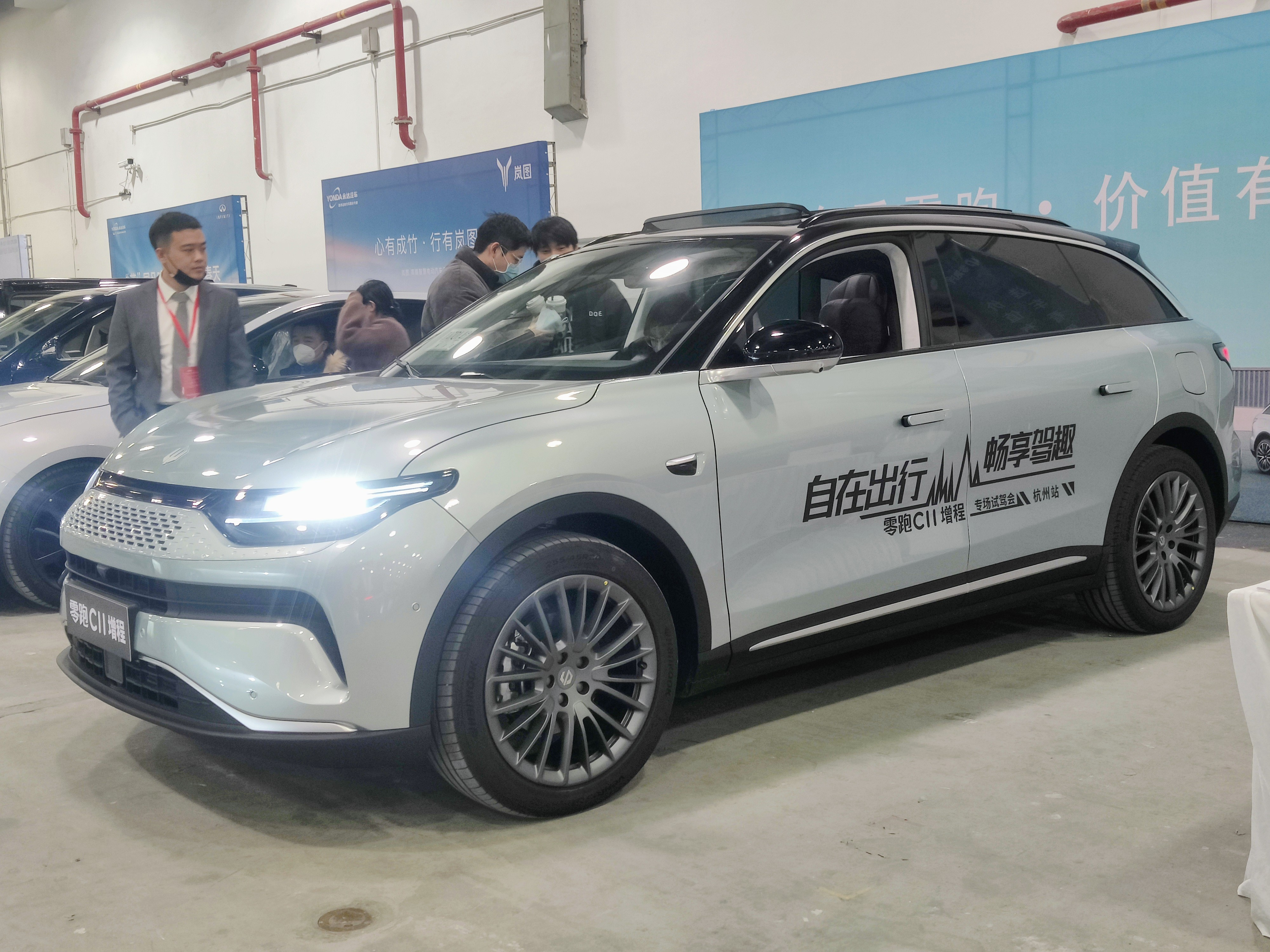
Leapmotor C11 EREV

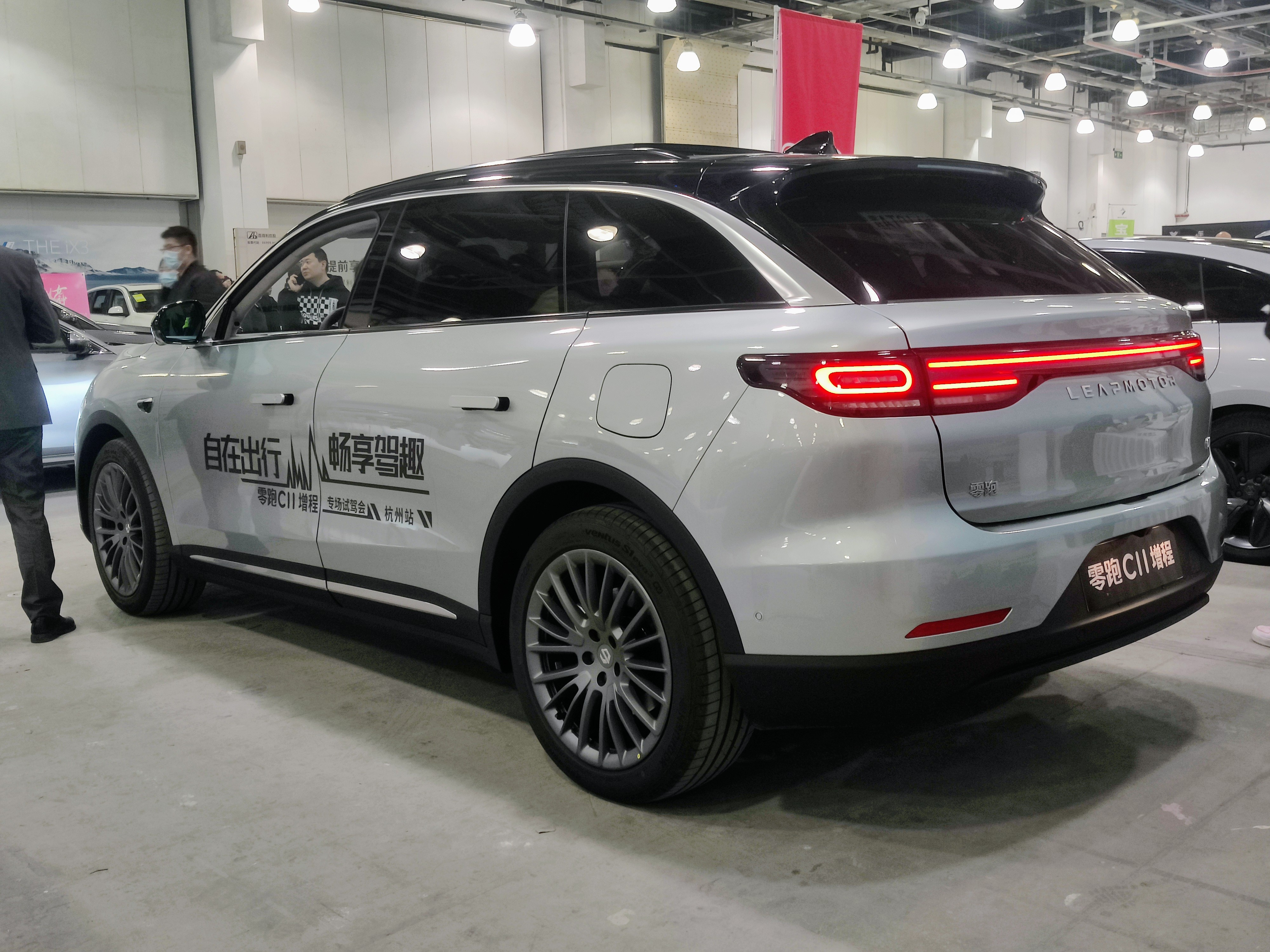
Rear view

Model	Engine	Engine Power	Motor	Total output
C11 EV	-	-	rear: 200 kW (268 hp), 360 N⋅m (266 ft⋅lb)	
C11 EV 4WD	-	-	front & rear: 200 kW (268 hp), 360 N⋅m (266 ft⋅lb)	400 kW (536 hp), 720 N⋅m (531 ft⋅lb)
C11 EREV	1.2L DAM12TD turbo I3	96 kW (129 hp) at 5500 rpm	rear: 200 kW (268 hp), 360 N⋅m (266 ft⋅lb)	

== 2026 update ==
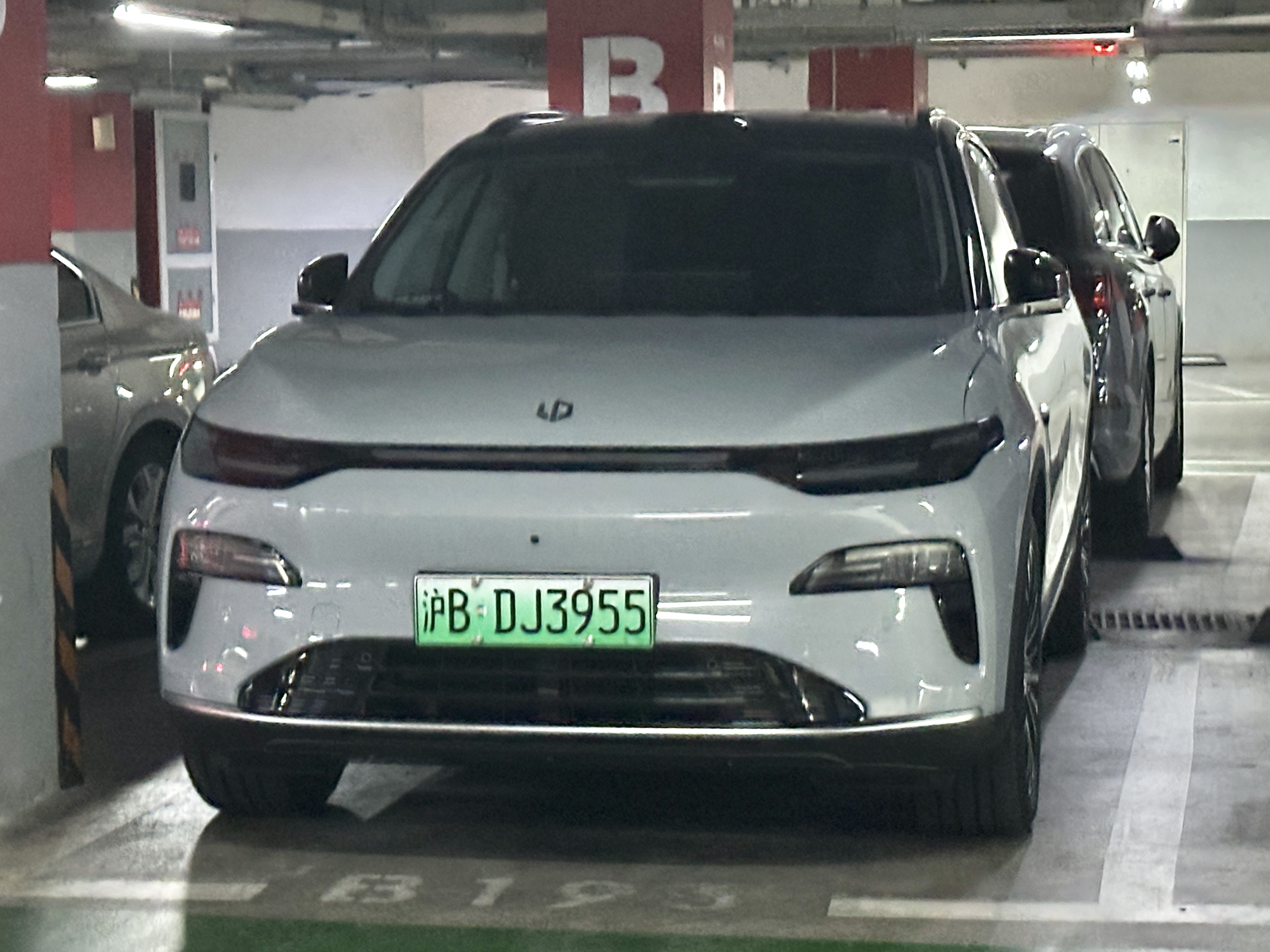
Leapmotor C11 2026 (update)

The C11 received a facelift for the 2026 model year on July 10, 2025. The update unifies the BEV and EREV exterior differences and both variants of the car now shares the same front end. The updated C11 now features split lamps on the front end, with the actual headlamp modules moved lower on the front bumper, leaving the DRLs in the original position. The facelift has reduced the drag coefficient from the previous 0.286 Cd to 0.28 Cd. For the electric platform, both variants have been upgraded to an 800V high-voltage platform and take 18 minutes from 30% to 80% state of charge under fast charging. The 2026 EREV is powered by a 94 hp (70 kW) 1.5 liter engine, and a rear positioned 200 kW (268 hp)/320 Nm permanent magnet synchronous motor with a 41.7 kWh lithium iron phosphate battery. The 2026 BEV is powered by a 220 kW (295 hp)/360 Nm rear permanent magnet synchronous motor with a 81.9 kWh lithium iron phosphate battery.

== Leapmotor C-More concept ==
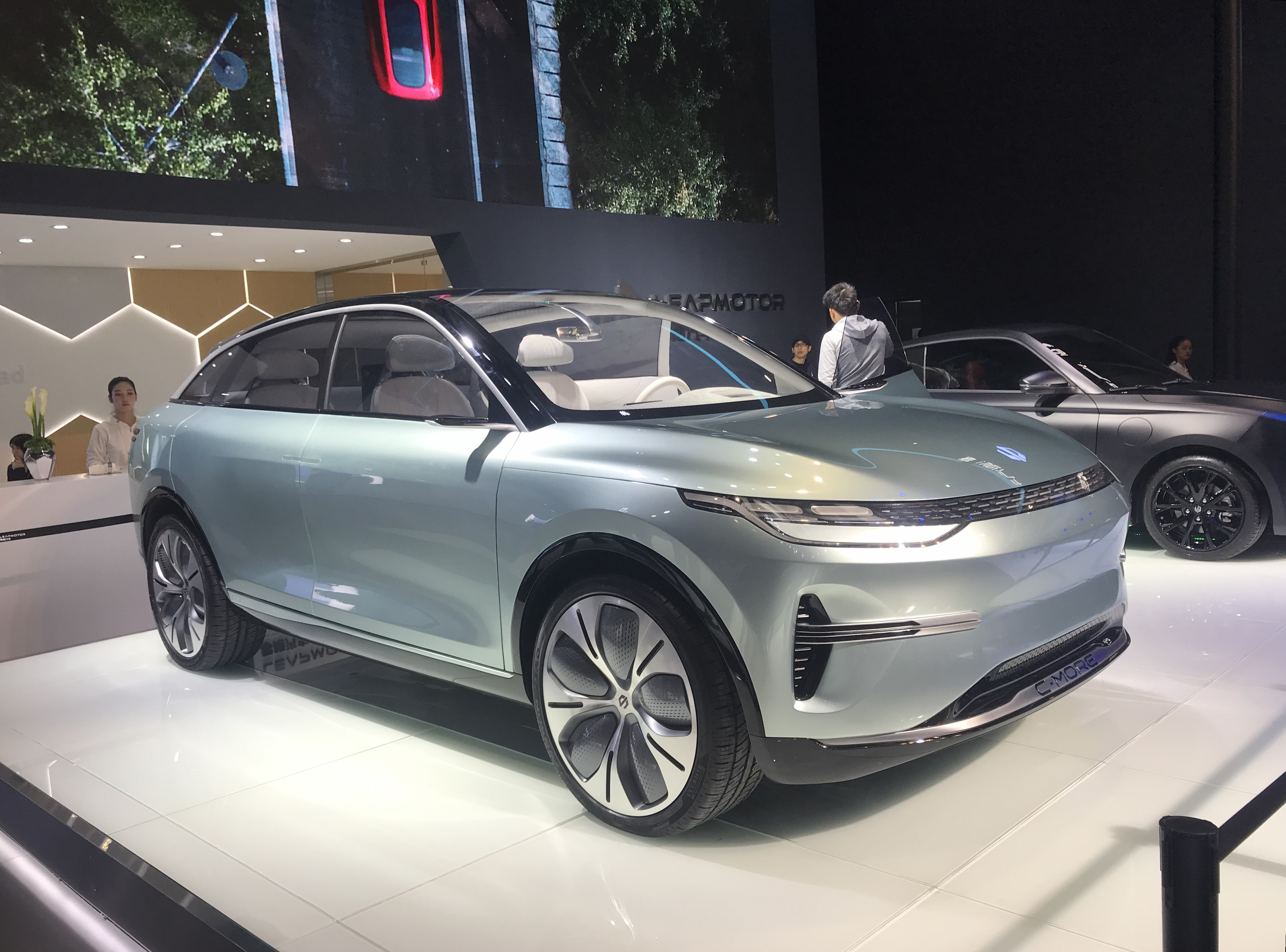
Leapmotor C-More concept

The Leapmotor C-More is an electric mid-size SUV concept introduced at the 2019 Shanghai Auto Show that previewed the C11 production model, which retains many design cues of the concept. Unlike the production C11, the C-More has suicide doors. Leapmotor explained that the name "C-More" means "see more". The interior has a 8-inch HUD and a 15-inch multimedia display.

== Sales ==
Since its launch on 28 September 2021, the C11 reached a cumulative total of 250,000 sales on 5 June 2025, after passing the 200,000 mark in December 2024.

Year	China		
Year	EV	EREV	Total
2021	4,021	—	4,021
2022	44,371	—	44,371
2023	47,307	33,309	80,616
2024	59,695	24,747	84,442
2025	68,693	23,100	91,793
