= Leapmotor S01 =

Battery electric sports car

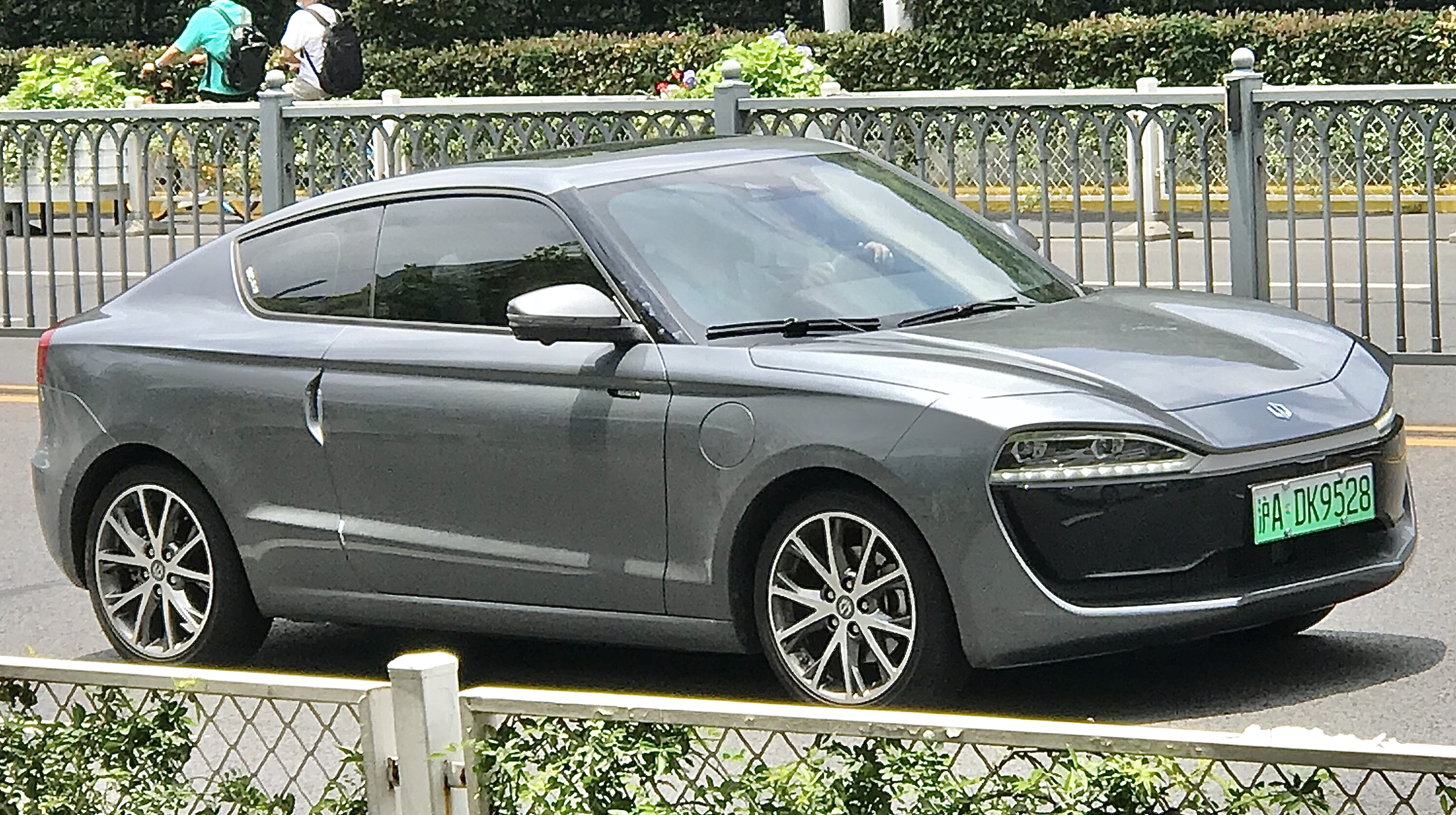

Overview
- Manufacturer: Leapmotor
- Also called: Leapmotor LP-S01
- Production: 2019–2021
- Assembly: China: Hangzhou, Zhejiang

Body and chassis
- Class: Sports car (S)
- Body style: 2-door coupé
- Layout: Front motor, front-wheel drive

Powertrain
- Electric motor: Permanent magnet synchronous
- Power output: 125 kW (168 hp; 170 PS)
- Transmission: 1-speed direct drive
- Battery: 35.6 kWh Li-ion (380 and 380 Pro); 48 kWh Li-ion (460 and 460 Pro)
- Electric range: 310 km (190 miles) (48 kWh)
- Plug-in charging: 25kW DC; 3.5kW AC

Dimensions
- Wheelbase: 2,500 mm (98.4 in)
- Length: 4,075 mm (160.4 in)
- Width: 1,760 mm (69.3 in)
- Height: 1,380 mm (54.3 in)
- Curb weight: 1,215 kg (2,679 lb)

The Leapmotor S01 (Chinese: 零跑S01; pinyin: Língpǎo S01; stylized in italics), previously known as the Leapmotor LP-S01, is a battery electric sports car produced by Chinese automobile manufacturer Leapmotor from 2019 to 2021.

== Overview ==
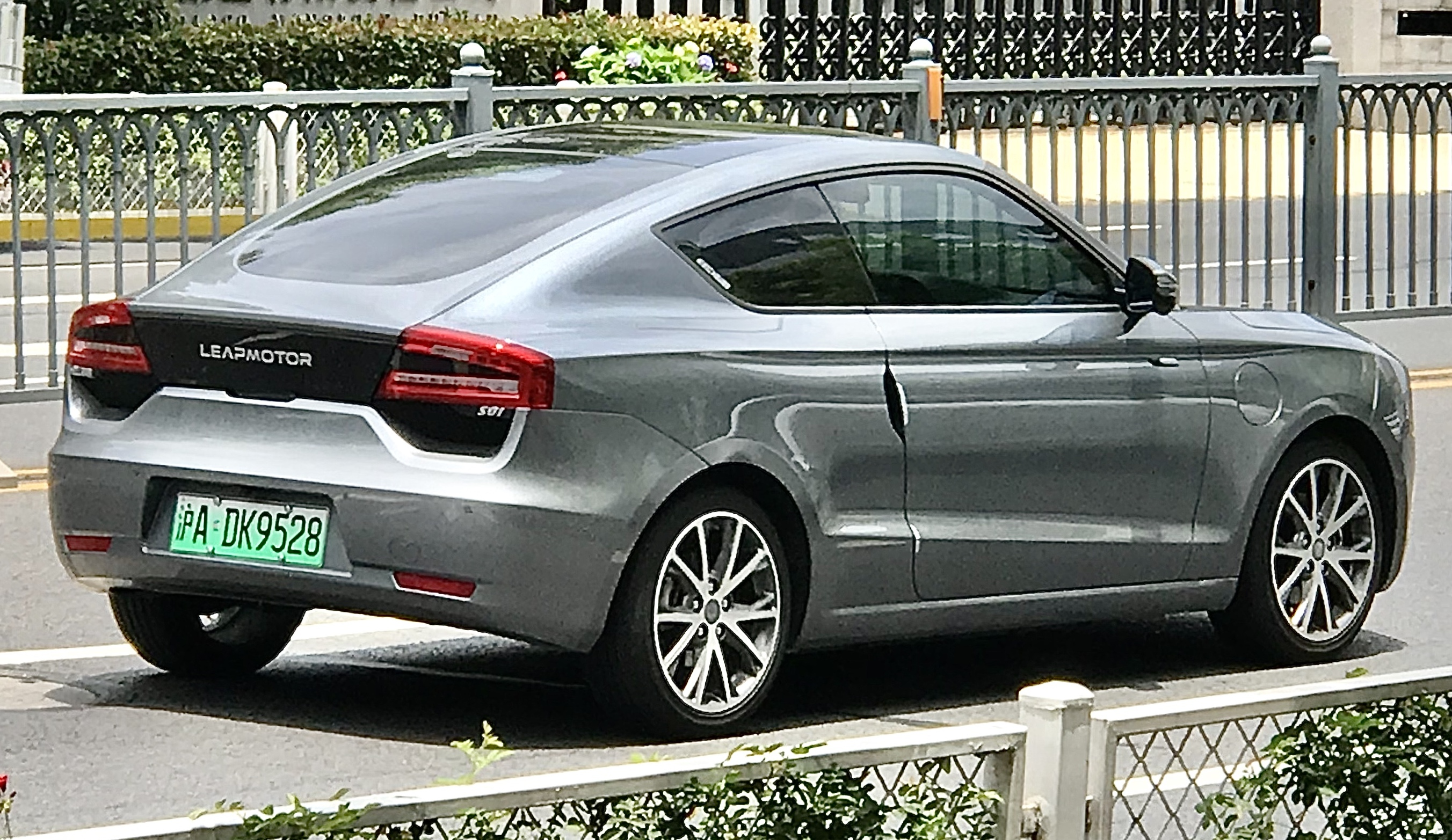
Rear view

A prototype of the S01 was shown at the Guangzhou Auto Show in 2017. At that time, the company had raised 380 million in capital, and construction of the factory had started. The S01 is the brand's first vehicle.

The first deliveries occurred in June 2019.

The car is a coupe with 2+2 seating. The top version, powered by an electric motor producing 168 hp (125 kW; 170 PS) and 250 N⋅m (184 lb⋅ft), can accelerate from 0 to 100 km/h (0 to 62 mph) in 6.9 seconds. The motor is a permanent magnet synchronous motor.

The vehicle combines small height and small width (hence the small frontal area) with an aerodynamic side profile and a relatively low mass for an EV (the manufacturer does not specify it on its website, but one previous announcement indicated a mass of only 1240 kg).

The car features level 2 autonomous driving (called "Leap Pilot"), with a possibility of enabling level 3 autonomous driving in the future through over-the-air updates.

As of March 2020, two battery options - 35.6 kWh and 48 kWh - are available. Typically for Chinese cars, the range is given only according to the overly optimistic NEDC methodology, no longer in use in Europe. However, with a 48 kWh battery and given the car's small dimensions, the EPA range can be reasonably estimated at not less than 190 miles (310 km).

== Pricing ==
Prices as of March 2020, after subsidies:

- 380: 119,900 CNY ($16,900)
- 380 Pro: 139,900 CNY ($19,700)
- 460: 139,900 CNY ($19,700)
- 460 Pro: 159,900 CNY ($22,500)

== Sales ==
Total sales of the S01 in 2019 amounted to over 1,000 units.

Year	China
2019	1,000
2020	709
2021	640
2022	63
