= Leapmotor T03 =

Battery electric city car

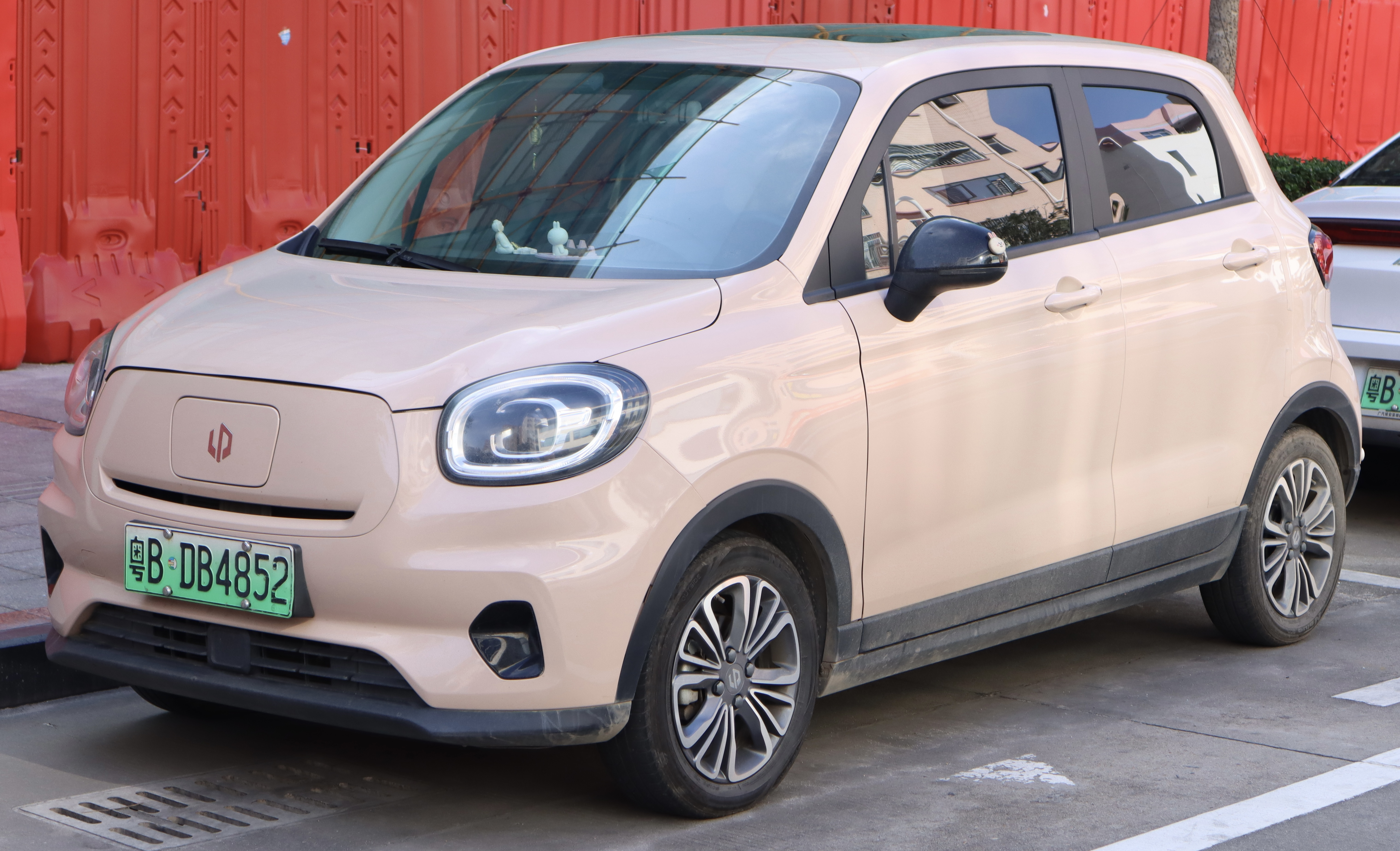

Overview
- Manufacturer: Leapmotor
- Production: 2020–2026 (China); 2024–present (export)
- Assembly: China: Jinhua, Zhejiang; Poland: Tychy (FCA Poland) (June 2024 – March 2025)

Body and chassis
- Class: City car (A)
- Body style: 5-door hatchback
- Layout: Front-motor, front-wheel drive

Powertrain
- Electric motor: Permanent magnet synchronous
- Power output: 40 kW (54 hp; 54 PS); 55 kW (74 hp; 75 PS); 70 kW (94 hp; 95 PS); 85 kW (114 hp; 116 PS)
- Battery: 21.6 kWh LFP Gotion; 31.9 kWh LFP Gotion; 36.5 kWh lithium-ion; 37.3 kWh LFP; 41.3 kWh LFP Gotion
- Electric range: 200–403 km (124–250 mi) (NEDC)

Dimensions
- Wheelbase: 2,400 mm (94.5 in)
- Length: 3,620 mm (142.5 in)
- Width: 1,652 mm (65.0 in)
- Height: 1,577 mm (62.1 in)
- Curb weight: 1,087–1,122 kg (2,396–2,474 lb)

The Leapmotor T03 (Chinese: 零跑T03; pinyin: Língpǎo T03) is a battery electric city car produced by Chinese automobile manufacturer Leapmotor.

Following Stellantis' investment in Leapmotor, the T03 was manufactured at its factory in Tychy, Poland, from June 2024 until March 2025. Although already at least since November 2024, when Poland voted in line with EU tariffs on Chinese-made EVs, this venture was put under question.

== Overview ==
The T03 is the second product launched by the firm, following the S01 coupe. It was launched on May 11, 2020. It was planned to be offered in the UK from 2025.

The T03 was initially offered in three variants, including the 400 Standard Edition, the 400 Comfort Edition, and the 400 Deluxe Edition. The Leapmotor T03 is powered by a 36.5 kWh lithium battery with a density of 171 Wh/kg and offers a maximum range of up to 403 kilometres (250 mi) on the NEDC cycle in a single charge. The T03 also supports fast charging and 80 percent charge can be done in 36 minutes with the battery coming with an 8 year/150,000 km warranty. The power of the T03 comes from a 55 kW (74 hp; 75 PS) motor that makes a maximum torque of 155 N⋅m (114 lb⋅ft).

In China the T03 was updated by 2023, and is available with either a 21.6 kWh battery paired with a 40 kW (54 hp; 54 PS) motor for 200 kilometres (120 mi) of CLTC range, a 31.9 kWh battery paired with a 55 kW (74 hp; 75 PS) motor for 310 kilometres (190 mi) of range, or a 41.3 kWh pack with an 80 kW (110 hp; 110 PS) and 403 kilometres (250 mi) of range. Leapmotor updated the powertrain of the T03 for 2025, dropping the lowest trim level and smallest battery pack.

The Leapmotor T03 features Level 2 autonomous driving capability, and is equipped with three external cameras, one millimetre wave radar, and 11 ultrasonic sensors. Interior features of the T03 include an 8.0-inch TFT instrument cluster and a 10.1-inch touchscreen.

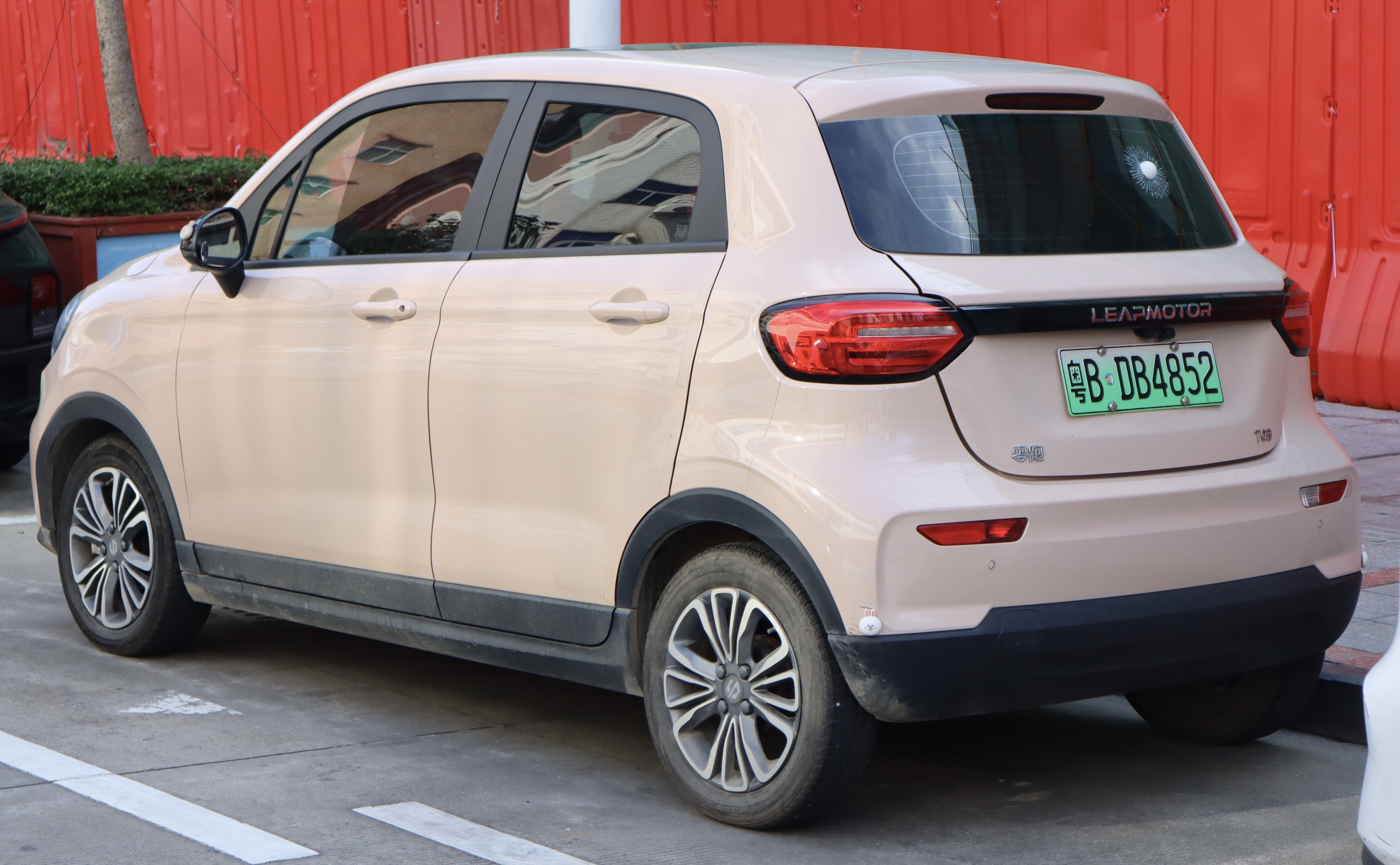
Rear view

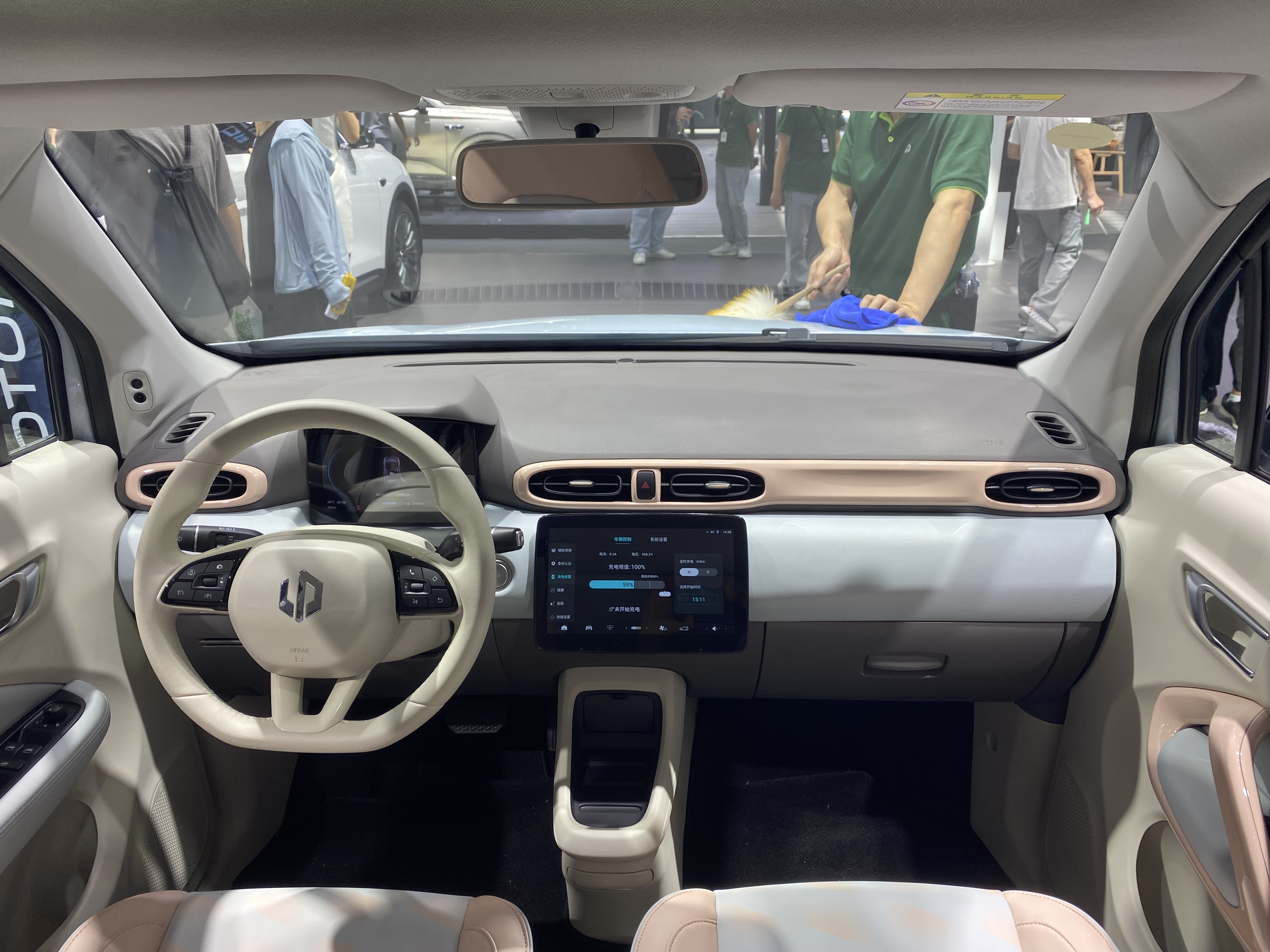
Interior

== Sales ==
Year	China
2020	9,831
2021	40,245
2022	61,919
2023	38,454
2024	66,884
2025	47,442
