= Auto Guangzhou =

Annual Chinese auto show

- Native name: 中国(广州)国际汽车展览会
- English name: Guangzhou International Motor Show
- Date: 2003; 23 years ago
- Duration: November and December, annually
- Venue: Guangzhou International Convention and Exhibition Center
- Location: Guangzhou, China
- Also known as: China (Guangzhou) International Automobile Exhibition
- Theme: Auto show
- Organized by: Guangzhou Zhanlian Exhibition Service Co., Ltd
- Website: Auto Guangzhou

Guangzhou International Automobile Exhibition (Chinese: 广州国际汽车展览会), or Auto Guangzhou (simplified Chinese: 广州汽车展; traditional Chinese: 廣州汽車展; pinyin: Guǎngzhōu qìchē zhǎn), is one of the three major auto shows in China (together with Auto China and Auto Shanghai). It is held by Guangzhou Zhanlian Exhibition Service and takes place in November-December every year in the Canton Fair Complex, China. It is also called Guangzhou International Motor Show (Chinese: 广州国际汽车展览会).

The Auto Guangzhou is considered to be accessible to the general public and serves as a year-end summary of the Chinese automotive market. It is not a recognized international show by the Organisation Internationale des Constructeurs d'Automobiles.

== History ==
The inaugural exhibition was held in 2003, opening on 24 November.

== 2004–2018 ==
In 2006, the Nissan Livina Geniss made its world premiere.

In 2007, Guangzhou Automobile Corporation (now GAC) displayed two concept cars which indicated the company's direction beyond existing joint ventures with Honda and Toyota. These were the AHEV and the 4-door Coupe.

2010 saw the Trumpchi introduced, the first own marque from GAC. In 2011, it was held from November 22 until November 28. That year saw Changan Automobile, based in Chongqing, showing four new models, including its new Changan Eado compact, and a new subcompact the B501. Other entrants included the redesigned BenBen Mini, and Changan's new BlueCore brand. The 2012 Guangzhou International Motor Show opened on November 22, 2012, debuting cars such as the 2014 Subaru Forester that year. In 2018, JMEV introduced the EVeasy sub-brand at the show.

== 2019 ==
At the 17th Guangzhou International Motor Show on November 22, 2019, a Tesla Model 3 that was manufactured in China was showcased. The 2019 event started with the world premiere of the Mercedes-Maybach GLS. Lexus also unveiled its first all-electric vehicle that year, the UX 300e. The Chevrolet Menlo EV debuted as well.

== 2020 ==
The 18th Guangzhou International Automobile Exhibition was held from November 20 until November 29, 2020, at the China Import and Export Fair Complex.

=== Production cars ===
- Bugatti Bolide
- BYD D1
- BYD Qin Plus
- Changan UNI-K
- Hyundai Mistra
- Infiniti QX55
- Kia Sportage Ace
- Leapmotor C11
- Mercedes-Maybach S class
- MG 5
- Roewe R-Aura concept
- Toyota Allion
- Toyota Lingshang
- Volkswagen ID.4 X and Crozz

== 2021 ==
The 2021 Auto Guangzhou was held from 11 to 28 November in 2021.

=== Production cars ===
- Aion LX Plus
- Audi A8 L Horch
- Audi Q5 e-Tron
- BYD Destroyer 05
- Genesis Electrified GV70
- GWM King Kong
- Honda Integra
- Lincoln Z
- Maxus Mifa 9
- Mitsubishi Airtrek
- Toyota Corolla Cross
- Toyota Frontlander
- Voyah Dreamer
- XPeng G9

== 2022 ==
The 2022 Auto Guangzhou was postponed from the original November 2022 date to December 30, 2022. Running until January 8, 2023.

=== Production cars ===
- Changan Yida
- Chery Tiggo 9
- GAC GS3
- GWM Shanhai Cannon
- Hyptec GT
- Haval H-Dog
- Hongqi H6
- Hycan V09
- IAT T-Mad
- IM L7 Snake Performance edition
- Jidu Robo-01
- Jidu Robo-02
- Mazda CX-50
- Tank 300 Cyber Knight and Iron Cavalry 02 special editions
- Tank 500 PHEV
- Toyota bZ3
- Toyota Crown SportCross
- Wey Lanshan DHT-PHEV

=== Concept cars ===
- Livan 7
- Toyota Crown Sedan Concept

== 2023 ==
The 2023 Auto Guangzhou was 17 to 26 November. Cars launched at the show included:

=== Production cars ===
- AITO M9
- BYD Sealion 07 EV
- BYD Song L EV
- Cadillac Optiq
- Chery Fulwin A8
- Chery Fulwin T6
- Dongfeng eπ 007
- Fangchengbao Bao 5
- Geely Galaxy E8
- Hycan A06 Plus
- Honda e:NP2
- Honda e:NS2
- Jetour Shanhai L6
- Li Mega
- Luxeed S7
- MG Cyberster
- Mercedes-Benz CLE
- Nammi 01
- Nissan Pathfinder (Chinese Version)
- Toyota Land Cruiser Prado (J250)
- Toyota Century SUV
- Toyota Camry (XV80)
- Volvo EM90
- Wuling Starlight
- XPeng X9
- Zeekr 007

=== Concept cars ===
- Changan CD701 Concept
- Chery Fulwin A9 Concept
- Chery Fulwin T11 Concept
- Lingxi L Concept

== 2024 ==
The 2024 Auto Guangzhou was November 15 to 24. Cars launched at the show included:

=== Production cars ===
- Audi A5L
- Audi Q6L e-tron Sportback
- Aion RT
- Aion UT
- BMW 2 Series Gran Coupé (redesign)
- BMW X3 (redesign)
- Bestune Yueyi 03
- BYD Xia
- BYD Seal 06 GT
- Changan CS75 Plus (redesign)
- Chery Fulwin A8L
- Chery Fulwin T8
- Denza Z9
- Denza N9
- Exeed Sterra ET (new powertrain)
- Ford Mondeo Sport
- Ford Equator (facelift)
- Ford Equator Sport (facelift)
- Forthing Xinghai V9
- Geely Cowboy
- Geely Galaxy Starship 7
- Geely Xingyuan
- Hongqi Guoya
- Hongqi Tiangong 08
- Hongqi Tiangong Sedan
- Hongqi Tiangong SUV
- Hyptec HL
- Hyundai Tucson (facelift)
- JAC Van Baolu
- JMC E-Fushun
- Leapmotor B10
- LEVC L380
- Lynk & Co Z20
- Livan 8
- Lexus ES (second facelift)
- Lincoln Navigator (redesign)
- MG ES5
- Nissan N7
- Onvo L60
- Trumpchi S7
- Volkswagen Tayron L
- Volkswagen Tharu XR
- Volkswagen Golf (facelift)
- Xiaomi SU7 Ultra
- XPeng P7+

=== Concept cars ===
- AUDI E Concept
- Hyundai Initium Concept
- Ji Yue Robo X Concept
- Toyota bZ7 Concept

== 2025 ==
The 2025 Auto Guangzhou was held from 21 through 30 November.

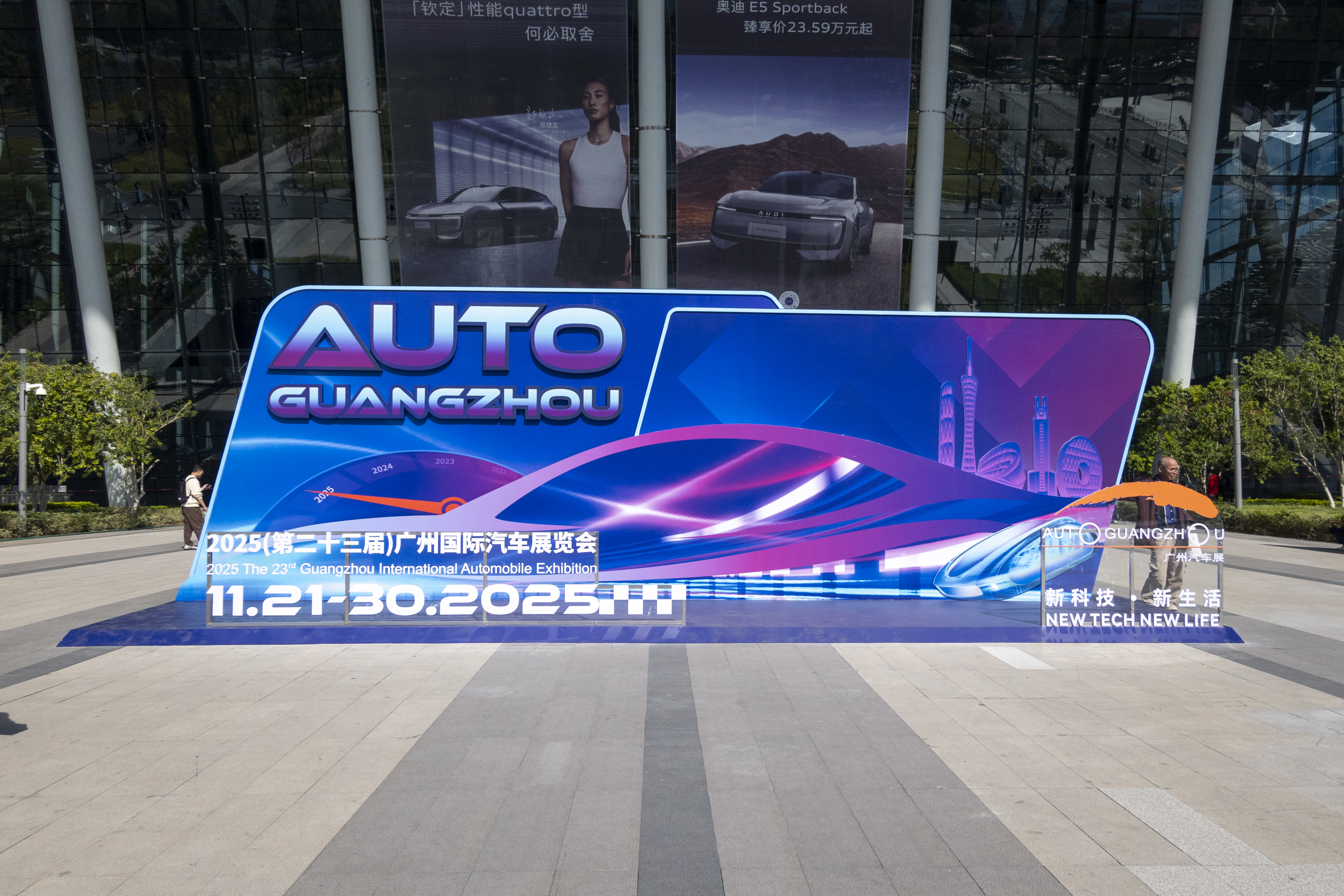
Entrance Auto Guangzhou 2025

=== Production cars ===
- 212 T01 Pick Up
- 212 T01 PHEV
- 212 T01 60th anniversary
- Arcfox N80KS
- Buick Electra Encasa
- Changan Nevo Q05
- Chery Fulwin A9
- Chery Fulwin T9L
- Deepal L06
- Exeed ET5
- Exeed Sterra ES7 GT
- Ford Bronco New Energy
- Geely Galaxy Starshine 6
- Geely Galaxy V900
- Hongqi HS6
- Hyptec A800
- iCar V27
- Kia Sportage (facelift)
- Leapmotor A10
- Leapmotor D19
- Leapmotor Lafa 5
- Nissan N6
- Nissan Teana
- Ora 5
- Roewe M7
- Stelato S9 (facelift)
- Toyota Corolla (E210) (facelift)
- Toyota RAV4 (XA60)
- Toyota Wildlander (XA60)
- Volkswagen Tavendor (facelift)
- Voyah Passion L
- Voyah Taishan

=== Concept cars ===
- AUDI E SUV Concept: Planned to enter production as the AUDI E7X.
- Beijing ELMT Max
- Kia EV5 Weekender
- Maxus Robo Van
- Maxus Robo Bus
- Mercedes-AMG Concept GT XX
- Mercedes-Benz Vision Iconic

== 2026 ==
The 2026 Auto Guangzhou will be held from 27 November through 6 December. It will feature a total of 1,106 vehicles of which 115 are debuting models and 707 are NEVs.

=== Production cars ===
- 212 T10
- Audi Q9
- Chery Arrizo 7
- Epicland X9 EV
- Exeed EX6
- Jetour Zongheng R700
- Leapmotor Lafa 5 (Update)
- Lexus TZ
- Mercedes-Benz VLE
- Mini Countryman
- Nissan NX7
- Roewe Jiayue 07 EV
- Yangwang Altior

=== Concept cars ===
- Hyundai Mercury Concept

== Exhibits ==
The types of exhibits held include:

- China (Guangzhou) International Automobile Exhibition (Chinese: 中国(广州)国际汽车展览会/广州国际车展): Passenger vehicles
- Guangzhou International Electric Vehicle Show (Chinese: 广州国际電動汽车展览会/广州電動汽车展): Electric vehicles
- Guangzhou International Commercial Vehicle Exhibition (Chinese: 广州国际商用车展览会/广州商用车展): Commercial vehicles
- Guangzhou International Auto Part & Accessories Exhibition (Chinese: 广州国际汽车零部件及用品展览会/广州零部件及用品展): Automotive parts

== See also ==
- List of auto shows and motor shows by continent
- Automobile industry in China
- Auto Shanghai
