= Buick Velite 6 =

Compact station wagon produced by Buick

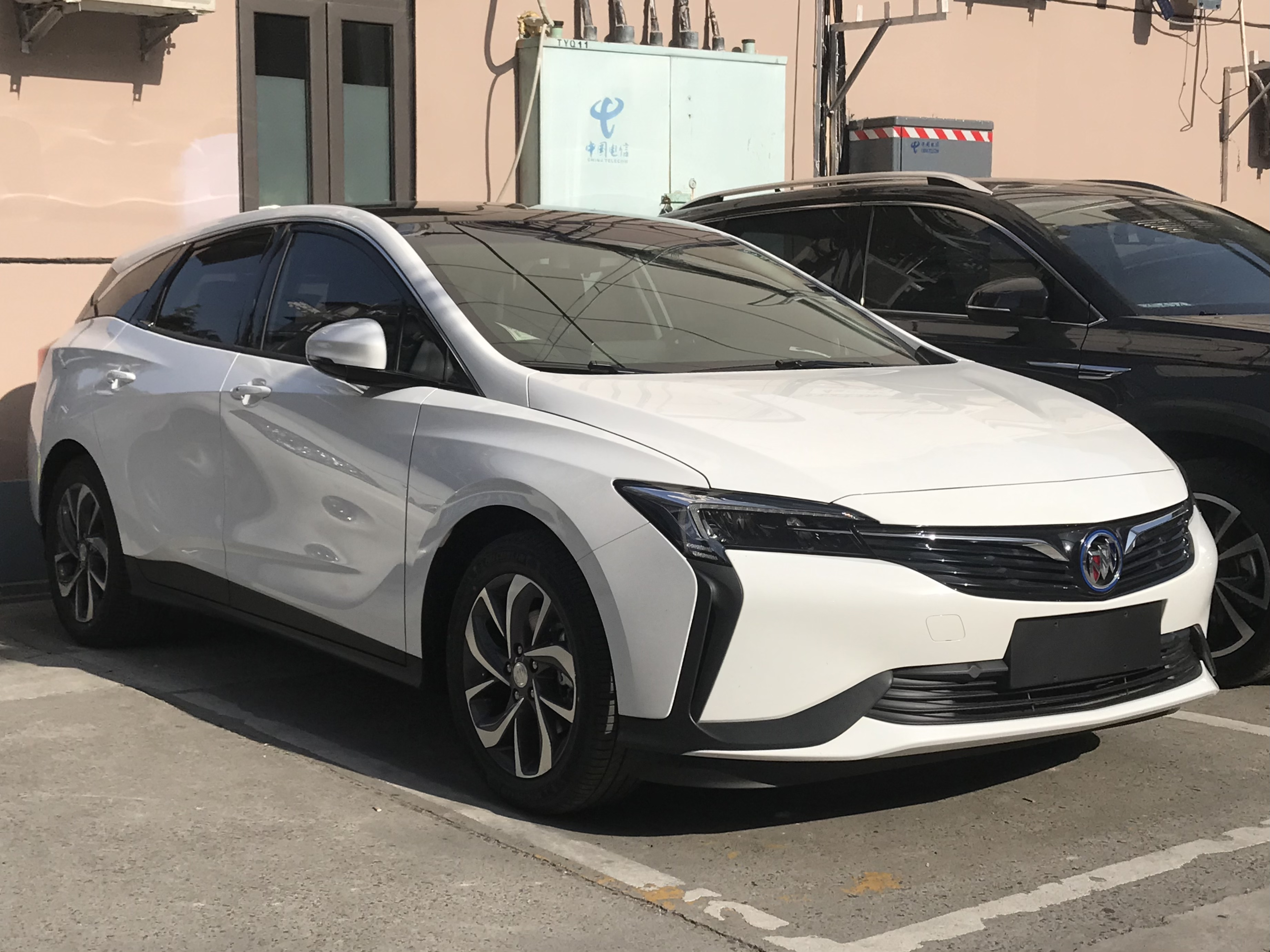
- Buick Velite 6 PHEV

Overview
- Manufacturer: SAIC-GM
- Production: 2019–present
- Assembly: China: Wuhan, Hubei (SAIC-GM)
- Designer: Longbai Yang

Body and chassis
- Class: Compact car (C)
- Body style: 5-door wagon
- Layout: Front-engine, front-wheel drive (PHEV); Front-motor, front-wheel drive (Electric)
- Related: Chevrolet Menlo

Powertrain
- Engine: 1.5 L L2B (B15) DVVT I4 (gasoline)
- Electric motor: 1x 85 kW (114 hp; 116 PS); 1x 110 kW (148 hp; 150 PS) (Plus); 1x 130 kW (174 hp; 177 PS) (EV); Permanent magnetic synchronous machine (PMSM)/generators; 1x 80 kW (107 hp; 109 PS) PMSM (PHEV)
- Transmission: Single reduction gearbox E-CVT (PHEV)
- Hybrid drivetrain: PHEV (Velite 6 PHEV)
- Battery: 35 kWh; Plus: 52.5 kWh; EV: 61.1 kWh; PHEV: 9.5 kWh; LG Chem liquid cooled lithium-ion
- Electric range: 301 km (187 mi); Plus: 410 km (250 mi); EV: 518 km (322 mi); PHEV: 60 km (37 mi)
- Plug-in charging: AC: 6 hours (Plus: 8 hours); DC Fast Charge: 0.67 hours to 80%

Dimensions
- Wheelbase: 2,660 mm (104.7 in)
- Length: 4,650 mm (183.1 in)
- Width: 1,817 mm (71.5 in)
- Height: 1,510 mm (59.4 in)
- Curb weight: 1,540–1,675 kg (3,395–3,693 lb)

Chronology
- Predecessor: Buick Velite 5

The Buick Velite 6 (微蓝) is a compact station wagon, or a "multi-activity vehicle" (MAV) that is sold exclusively in China built by Chinese-American manufacturer SAIC-GM under the Buick marque. It is available as either an electric car or a plug-in hybrid electric vehicle (PHEV).

== History ==
The Velite 6 was previewed with the Velite concept car in 2016 (not to be confused with the 2004 concept of the same name). In April 2018, two production-intent models were unveiled; one electric, and the other a plug-in hybrid. The production Buick Velite 6 debuted at the 2019 Shanghai Auto Show in April. At first, it was only available as an all-electric vehicle, with two battery options available. In July 2020, the production plug-in hybrid version was launched.

The Velite 6 is available in three variants: Entry, Middle, and Luxury. It also features three driving modes (standard, sport, and economy) and three levels of energy recycling.

== Velite 6 Plus ==
The Buick Velite 6 Plus was introduced in October 2019. The Velite 6 Plus has a larger battery, with 52.5 kWh capacity and a range of up to 410 kilometers (250 mi) on the NEDC. It generates up to 110 kW (148 hp; 150 PS) and 350 N⋅m (258 lb⋅ft) torque.

== Velite 6 EV (2022) ==
In November 2021, Buick introduced an updated version of the original and Plus models, called the Velite 6 EV to distinguish it from the plug-in hybrid (PHEV). The battery was again improved, with 61.1 kWh capacity and a range of up to 518 kilometers (322 mi) on the NEDC. The updated motor generates up to 130 kW (174 hp; 177 PS). Other changes included an update to Buick's eConnect infotainment system with 10-inch screen, new wheel design, and an updated front bumper/grille design.

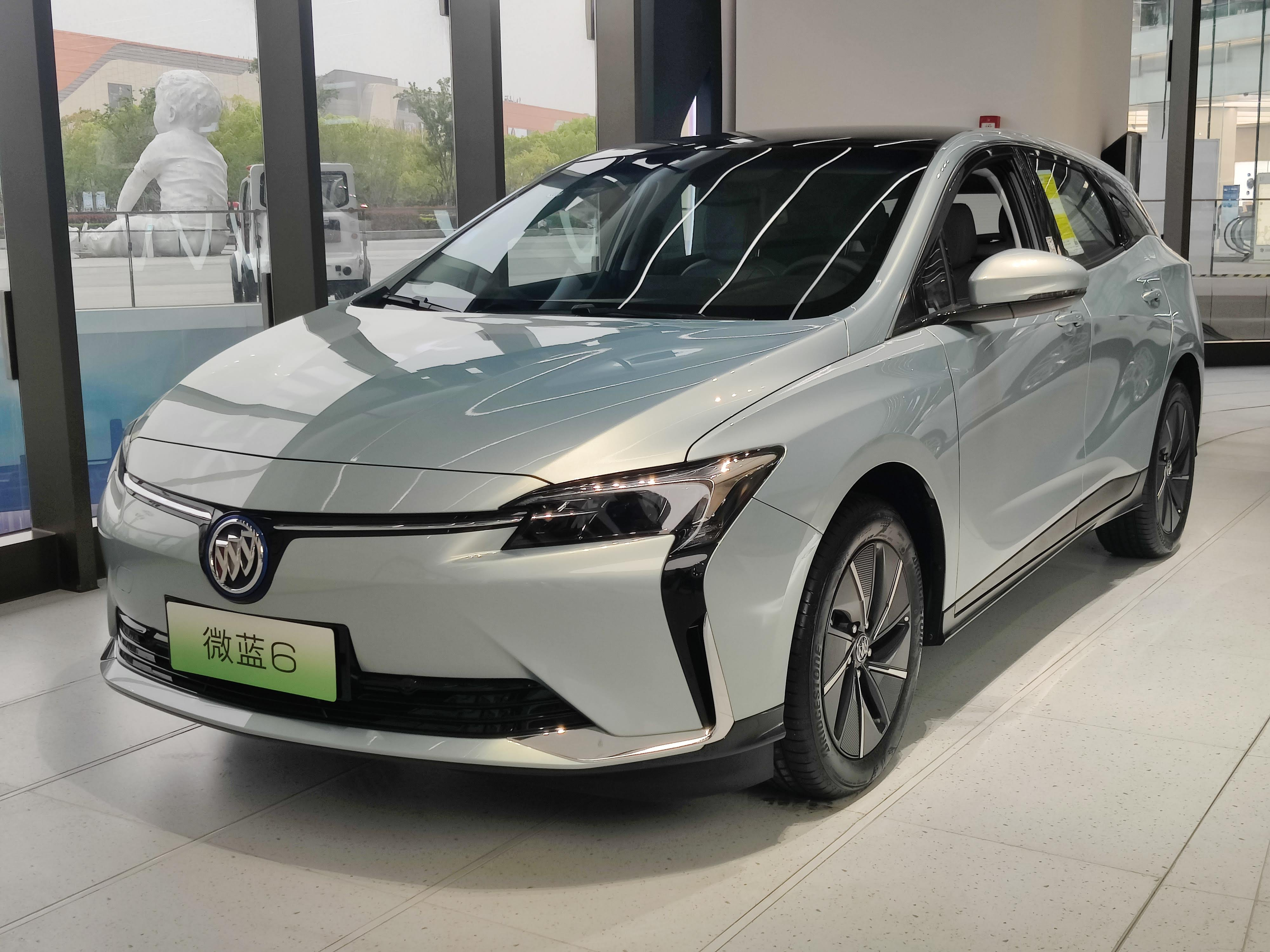
Buick Velite 6 EV front.

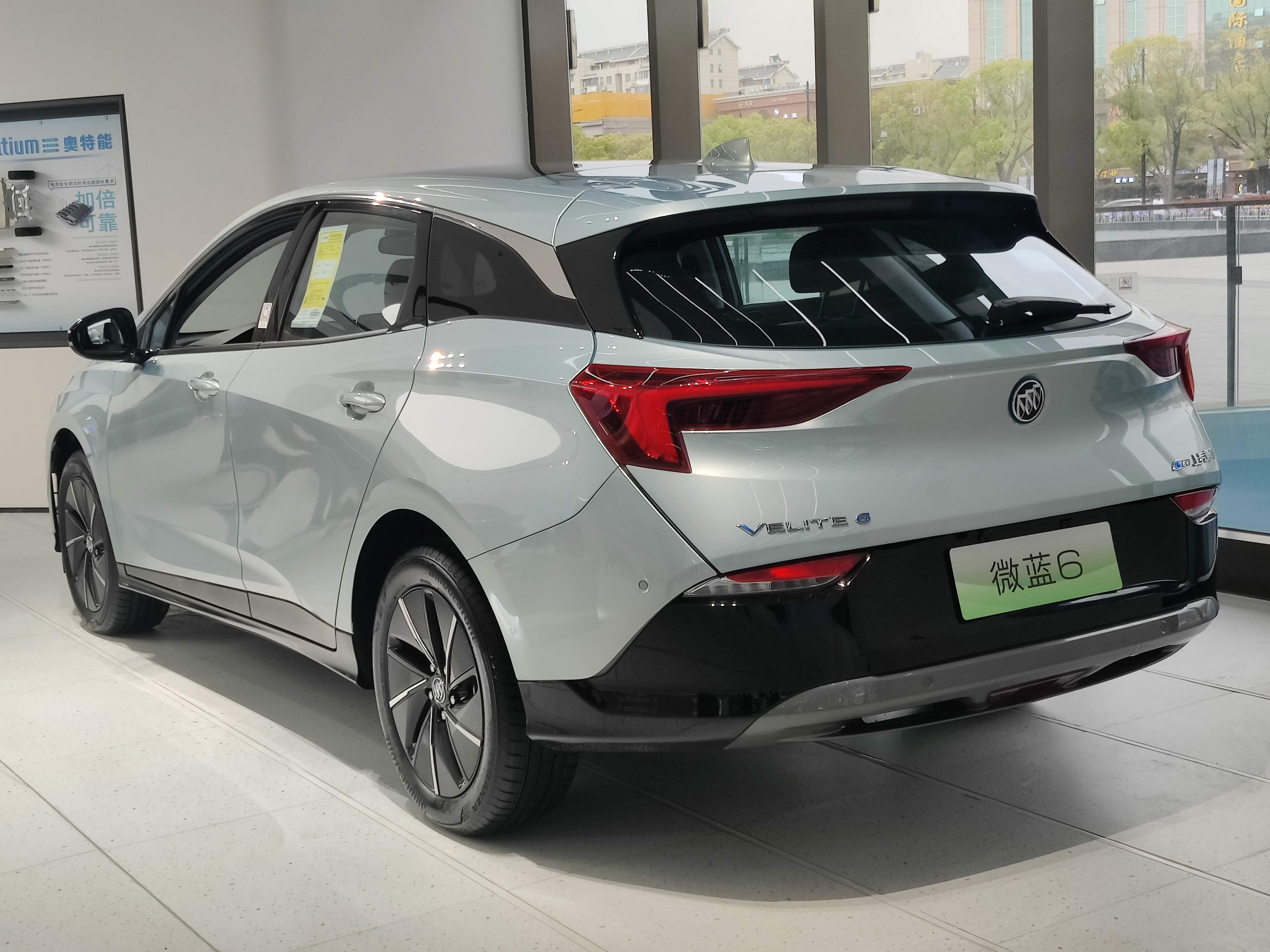
Buick Velite 6 EV rear.

== Velite 6 PHEV ==
The Buick Velite 6 PHEV combines a 1.5-liter 72-kilowatt (97 hp; 98 PS) internal combustion engine with an 80-kilowatt (107 hp; 109 PS) electric motor, driven by an electronically controlled variable transmission (e-CVT). Together, they produce 135 kW (181 hp; 184 PS) and 380 N⋅m (280 lb⋅ft) torque. With a 9.5-kWh battery capacity, the PHEV has an electric-only range of 60 kilometres (37 mi) and total range of 780 kilometres (480 mi). The Velite 6 PHEV includes a "lock" mode which keeps the car on hybrid power for maximum range.

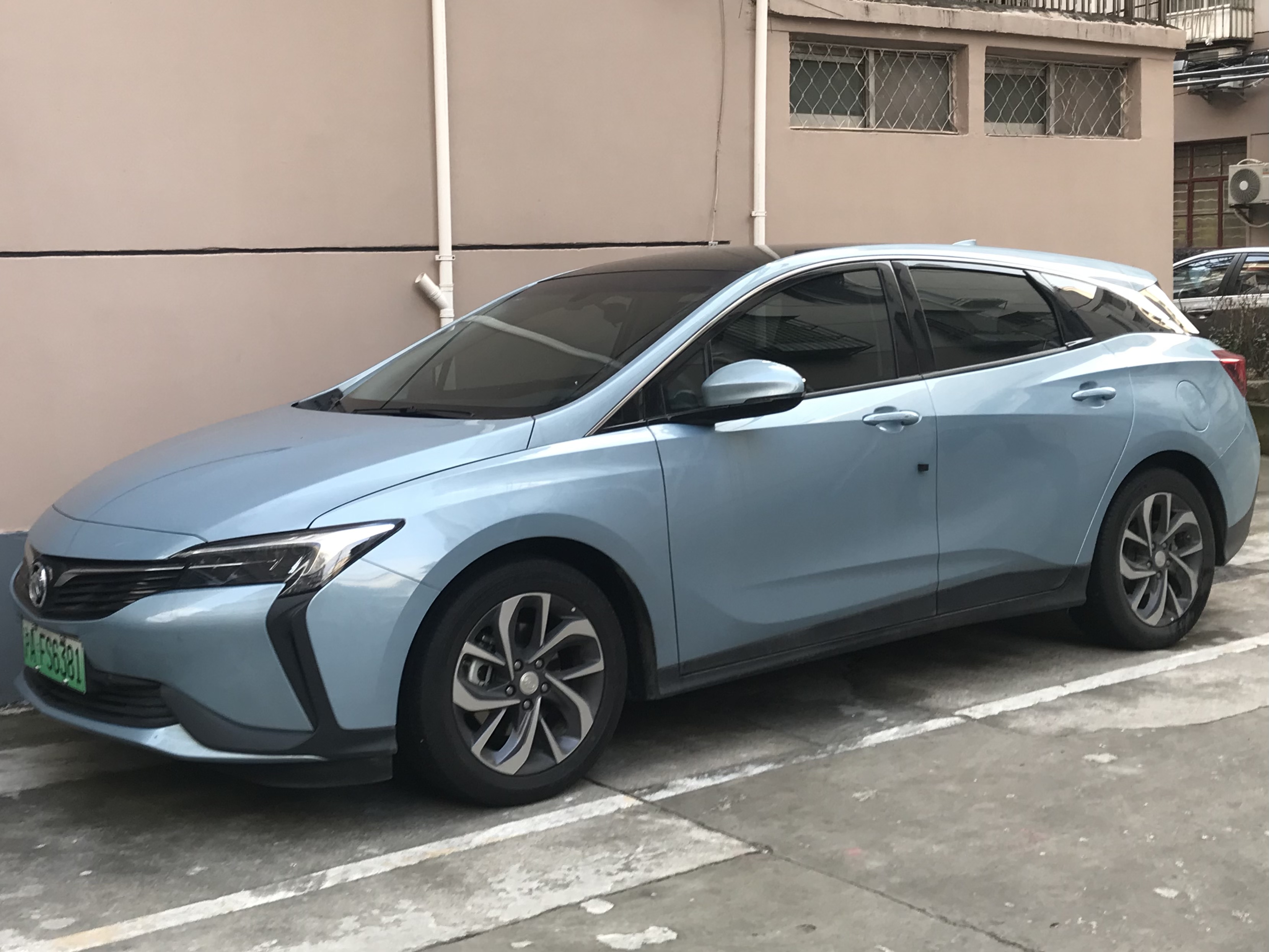
Buick Velite 6 PHEV front.

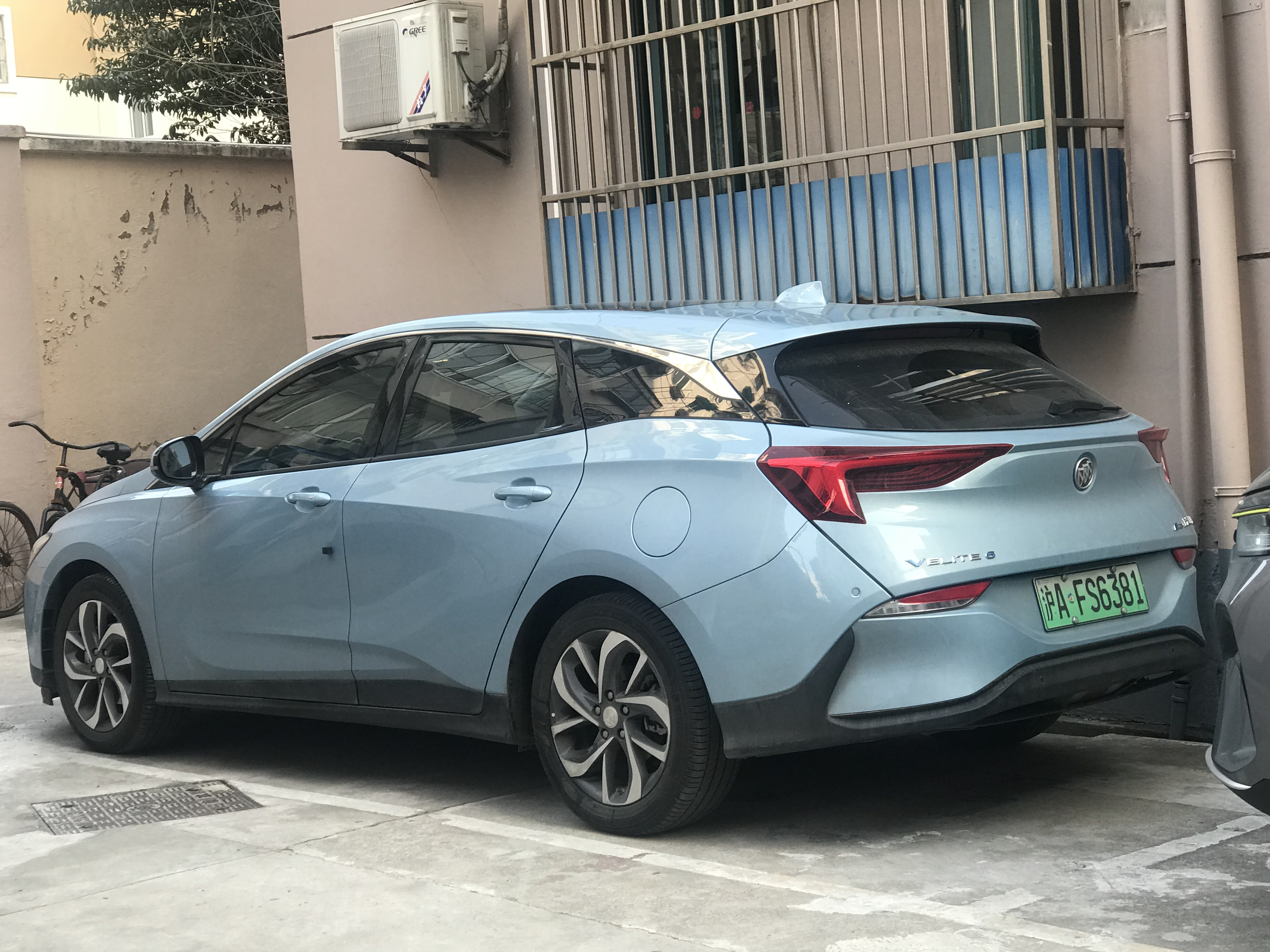
Buick Velite 6 PHEV rear.

== Sales ==
Year	China		
Year	EV	PHEV	Total
2023	35,312	7,413	42,275
2024	49,835	5	49,840
2025	5,014	7	5,021

== See also ==
- Chevrolet Menlo
- List of modern production plug-in electric vehicles
- New energy vehicles in China
- Plug-in electric vehicle
