= 212 T01 =

SUV, pickup truck and van

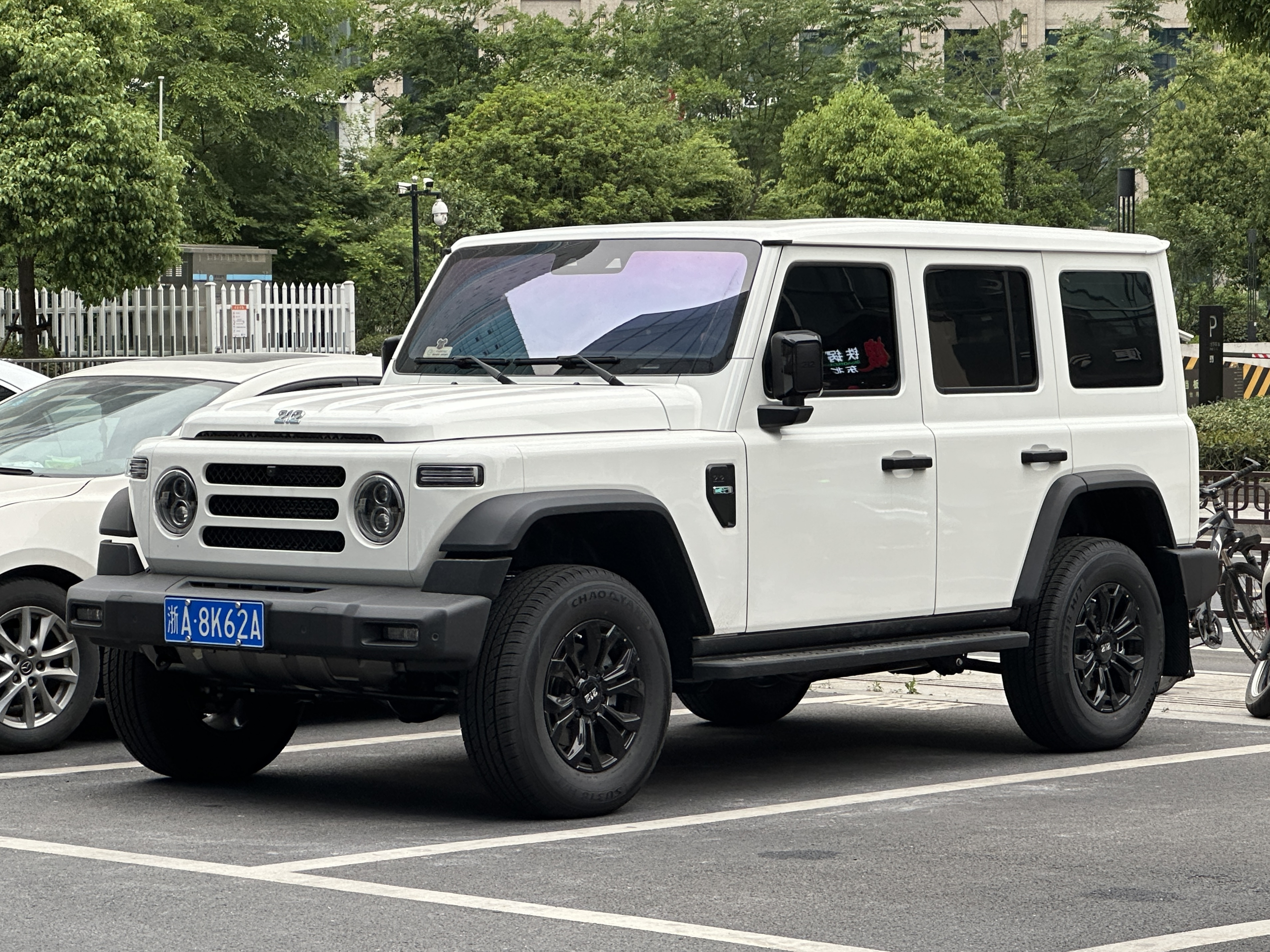

Overview
- Manufacturer: BAW
- Also called: 212 T10 (3-door); 212 N30 (5-door troop carrier); 212 Explorer T01 (pickup truck); BAW 212 (export); EMC 212 (Italy); Yooudooo 6 (Spain)
- Production: 2024–present
- Assembly: China

Body and chassis
- Class: Compact SUV; Mid-size SUV; Mid-size pickup truck
- Body style: 3-door SUV; 5-door SUV; 4-door pickup truck; 5-door van

Powertrain
- Engine: 2.0 L N20TG turbo I4; 2.0 L turbo-diesel I4
- Transmission: 8-speed automatic

Dimensions
- Wheelbase: 2,860 mm (112.6 in); 2,570 mm (101.2 in) (T10); 3,488 mm (137.3 in) (Explorer T01)
- Length: 4,705 mm (185.2 in); 4,416 mm (173.9 in) (T10); 5,469 mm (215.3 in) (Explorer T01)
- Width: 1,895 mm (74.6 in); 1,955 mm (77.0 in) (T10, Explorer T01)
- Height: 1,936 mm (76.2 in); 1,925 mm (75.8 in) (T10); 1,970 mm (77.6 in) (Explorer T01)
- Curb weight: 2,150–2,265 kg (4,740–4,993 lb)

The 212 T01 is a SUV, pickup truck and van manufactured by BAW under the 212 brand.

== Overview ==
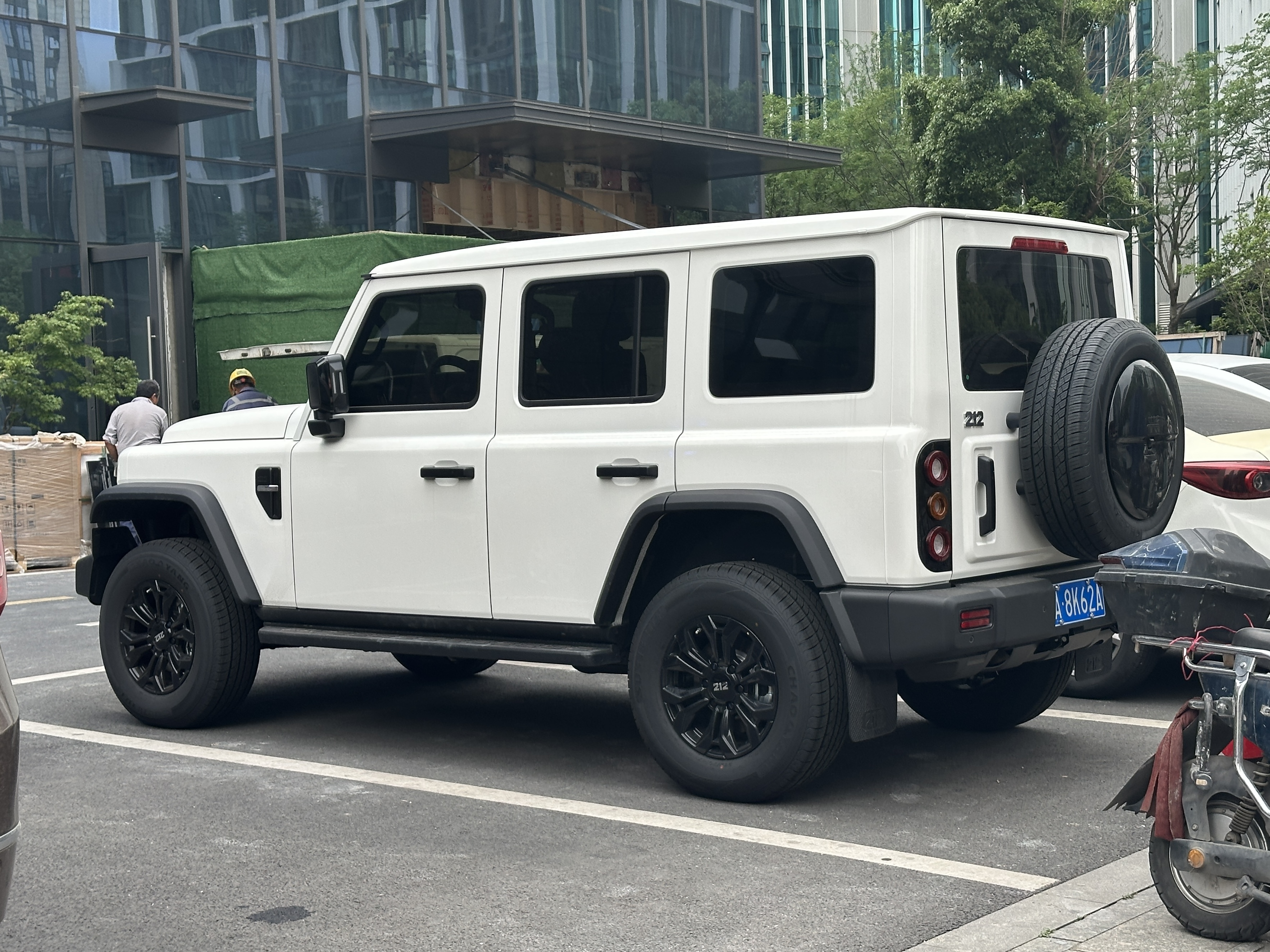
Rear view

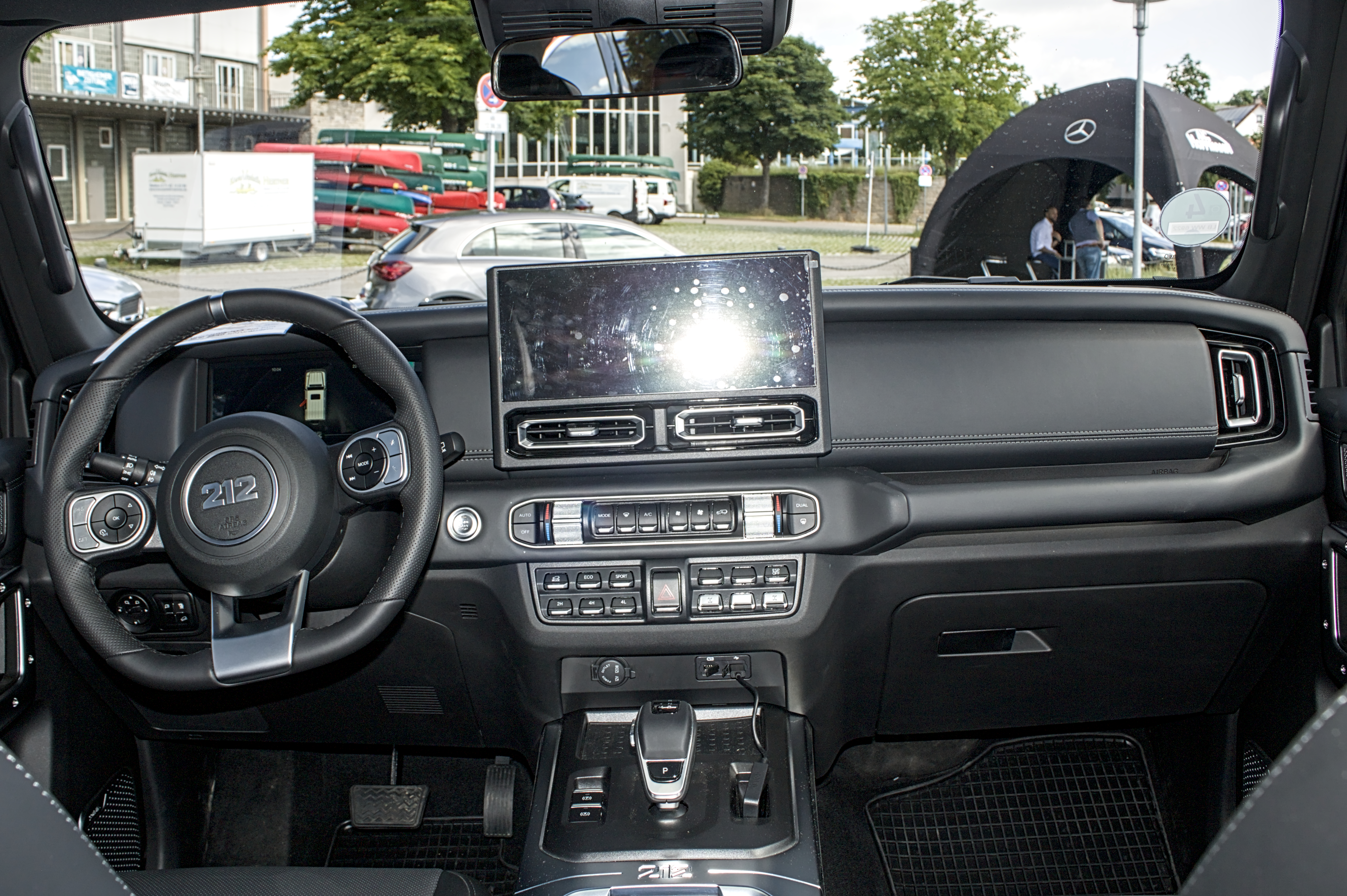
Interior

Launched in 1965 by Qingdao based Chinese automotive manufacturer Beijing Automobile Works (BAW) the BJ212 was an off-road four-wheel drive sports utility vehicle which was developed together with UAZ-469 which was manufactured by Ulyanovsky Avtomobilny Zavod (UAZ) an Ulyanovsk based Russian automotive manufacturer.

The SUV had a significant role in Chinese auto industry and Chinese army for its versatility and off-road capabilities. To meet new demand of new era BAW created a new brand. In 2022 new brand name was trademarked making it the first brand name to have only numbers and no alphabets.

=== Explorer T01 ===
A pickup truck version of the 212 T01 SUV was displayed at the Guangzhou Auto Show 2024 and was named Explorer T01 to differentiate it from the normal SUV. The truck is 5.4 meter long featuring a higher capacity 2.3 liter turbo diesel engine producing 190hp which can achieve a top speed of 160kmph and same 8 speed automatic gearbox. The cargo bed has a rated capacity of 495kg and higher towing capacity than the normal SUV which is 3 tons with approach and departure angle of 42 degrees and 26 degrees respectively.

=== Three door ===
The three door version is expected to launch soon. It may fill the three door off-road SUV gap in the domestic market due to the high cost of importing three door SUVs. The design is expected to be same as the full size version with similar engine options.

=== 60TH ===
A soft top version of the 212 T01 was showcased at the Guangzhou Auto Show 2025 named 60TH which pays homage to the original BJ212 which completed 60 years from 1965 to 2025 also had a soft top version. The soft top is removable and features soft rear windshield and a side tailgate. The vehicle features a hybrid powertrain which is unique for the 212 portfolio as they have only had petrol and diesel engines on all the models with this the vehicles has 60TH badging on the side doors.

== Specifications ==
The SUV has ground clearance of 235 mm (9.3 in) with approach and departure angles of 36° and 40° respectively. For off-road terrain the SUV has water wading capacity up to 850 mm (33.5 in) (depends on accessories and variants) and mounting points. Built on a ladder frame chassis using WY platform with Five link non-independent suspension, Electronic hydraulic steering system, alloy wheels size of 17 or 18 inch, spare wheel, electronic parking brake, 80 liter fuel tank, and maximum towing capacity of 2.5 tons.

=== Powertrain ===
It is powered by a 2.0-liter turbocharged "N20TG" petrol engine producing 248 hp (185 kW) and 410 N⋅m (302 lb⋅ft) of torque or 2.0-liter turbo-diesel engine producing 168 hp (125 kW) and 415 N⋅m (306 lb⋅ft) of torque, with an 8-speed automatic transmission, and a part-time four-wheel drive system.

Model	Year	Transmission	Drive	Type	Max Power	Torque	Top Speed	0-100 km/h (0-62 mph)	Fuel Tank	Mileage (L/100km)	Emission Norms
Petrol
2.0 T	2024–present	8 Speed auto	AWD	In-line 4	185 kW (248 hp)	410 N⋅m (302 lb⋅ft)	170 km/h (106 mph)	8.5s	80L	10.9-11.3	China VI
Diesel
2.0 T	2025–present	8 Speed auto	AWD	In-line 4	125 kW (168 hp)	415 N⋅m (306 lb⋅ft)	160 km/h (99 mph)	13.0s	80L	8.5	China VI

== Markets ==
=== UAE ===
The 212 T01 debuted in the United Arab Emirates on 28 October 2025 under Legend Motors a Dubai based Legend Holding Group company that deals in automotive trading in the UAE. This partnership between both companies make Legend Motors the exclusive distributor of 212 products. Powered by 2 liter turbo petrol engine with output of 248 hp (185 kW) and 410 N⋅m (302 lb⋅ft) torque supported by an 8-speed automatic transmission. Available in four different color and also three special editions named: Adventure, Falcon and Pioneer.

=== Russia ===
On 19 December 2025 212 T01 received Vehicle Type Approval for sales in the market of Russia. Power by a 2 liter Dongan N20TG turbocharged petrol engine producing 218 hp (163 kW) and 380 N⋅m (280 lb⋅ft) torque paired with a 8-speed automatic transmission. The vehicle is also available in a special trim named Adventurer RUS limited for Russia with winter package that has heated windshield, seats, steering wheel, exterior mirrors and a rear window.

In January 2026 the company placed a low powered turbo diesel engine in the 212 T01. The tweaked engine produced 156 hp (116 kW) but was still a 2 liter engine paired with a ZF automatic gearbox. This reduced the price of the SUV significantly to help expand 212 market in the nation. The pickup truck version is also planned to launch in the same year and expand the portfolio of the brand.

=== Germany ===
Indimo Automotive GmbH a Landstuhl based company and Beijing Automobile Works (BAW) partnered and showcased the 212 T01 at IAA Mobility trade fair in Munich on 14 September 2025. Powered by 2 liter diesel engine putting out 166 hp (124 kW) and an 8-speed automatic gearbox. Indimo deals in importing Chinese vehicles to Germany and Europe. They also provide with marketing and after sales service.

=== Italy ===
In the last quarter of 2025 Eurasia Motor Company a Lombardy based automotive company became the official distributor of the 212 T01 in Italy. The SUV is sold under EMC 212 name for the market else than that the vehicle stays unchanged. When comes to engine options both diesel and petrol engines are available with the 8 speed automatic transmission. The petrol engine puts out 217hp compared to 166hp of the diesel engine and both of these 2 liter engines meet Euro 6E European emission standards. EMC also has metallic paint and locking front differential as an option.

=== Uzbekistan ===
On 29 December 2025 Asaka Motors International a Tashkent based automotive group partnered with BAW to assemble the 212 T01 locally in Uzbekistan. Asaka Motors has also partnered with Geely, Exeed, Alfa Romeo, Fiat, Hyundai, Opel, Iveco, and Wuling. The company received approvals and clearance to assemble 212 T01 in Sirdaryo Region. The vehicle is equipped with a 2 liter engine producing 218 hp (163 kW) and 8 speed automatic transmission.

=== Australia ===
The 212 T01 is confirmed to go on sale in Australia in 2026 the Aussie spec version of the SUV will feature both diesel and petrol engines. Where the petrol puts out 250 hp (186 kW) and 300 N⋅m (221 lb⋅ft) torque and the diesel puts out 165 hp (123 kW) and 310 N⋅m (229 lb⋅ft) torque. Both engines will be paired with 8-speed automatic gearbox. Once the vehicle completes the Australian Design Rules-certified (ADR) testing only then distributors and dealers can get the units.

== Sales ==
Year	China	UAE	Russia	Germany	Italy	Uzbekistan	Australia
2024	4,262	-	-	-	-	-	-
2025	18,078						
