= Chevrolet Menlo =

Compact station wagon produced by General Motors

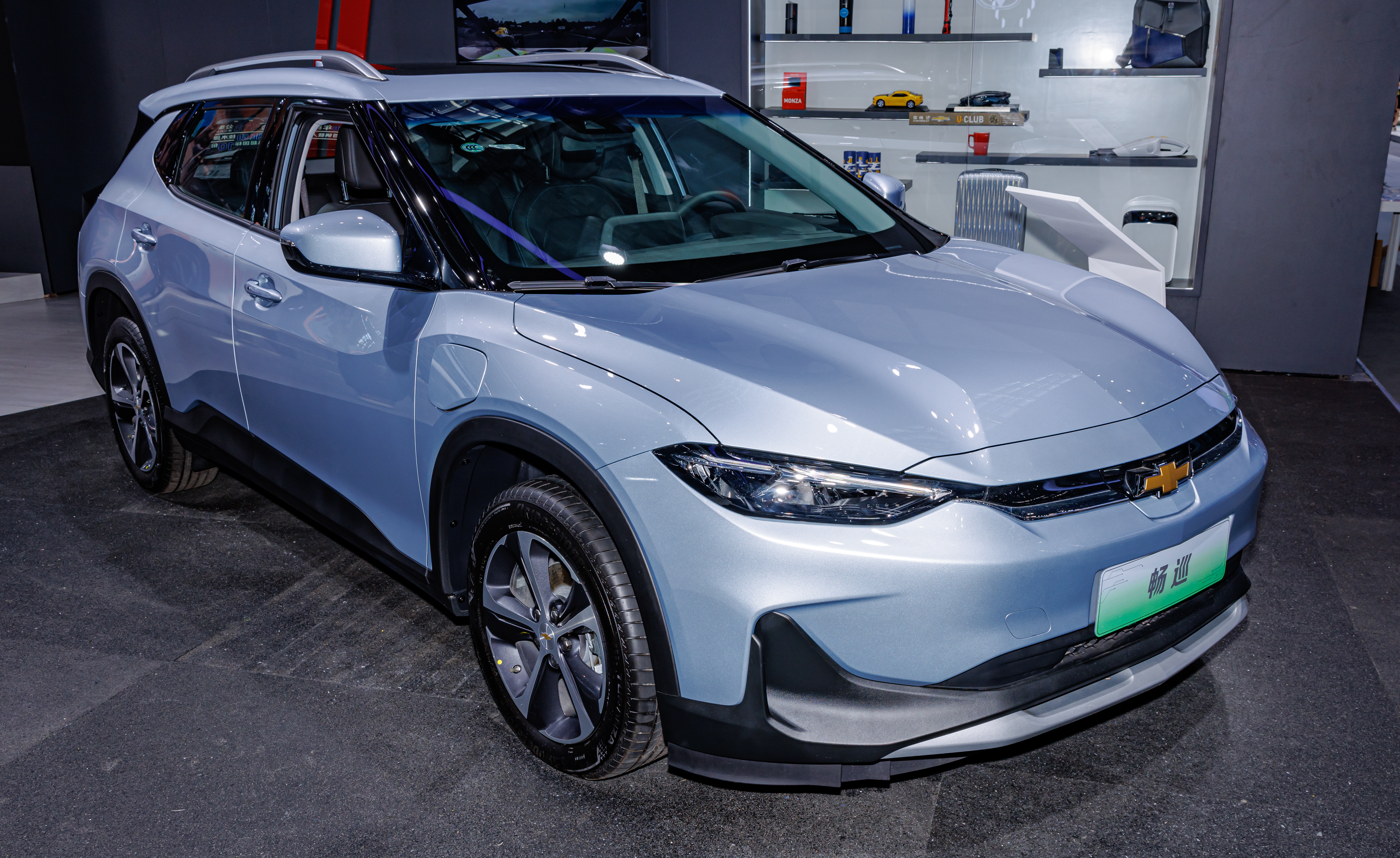

Overview
- Manufacturer: General Motors
- Production: 2020–2026
- Model years: 2021–2027
- Assembly: China: Wuhan, Hubei (SAIC-GM)
- Designer: Zongheng Sun

Body and chassis
- Class: Compact car (C)
- Body style: 5-door wagon
- Layout: Front-motor, front-wheel drive
- Related: Buick Velite 6 Chevrolet Bolt

Powertrain
- Electric motor: 1x permanent magnet motor/generators; 2020–2021: 110 kW (148 hp); 2022–2026: 130 kW (170 hp)
- Transmission: Fixed gear ratio
- Battery: Lithium-ion; 2020–2021: 52.5 kWh; 2022–2026: 61.1 kWh
- Electric range: 2020–2021: 410 km (250 mi); 2022–2026: 518 km (322 mi)
- Plug-in charging: AC: 8 hours; DC fast charge: 0.67 hours to 80%

Dimensions
- Wheelbase: 2,660 mm (104.7 in)
- Length: 4,665 mm (183.7 in)
- Width: 1,813 mm (71.4 in)
- Height: 1,538 mm (60.6 in)
- Kerb weight: 1,660 kg (3,660 lb)

The Chevrolet Menlo (Chinese: 畅巡; pinyin: chàng xún) is a battery electric compact station wagon manufactured by General Motors, sold exclusively in China. It is the first Chevrolet EV available in China.

== History ==
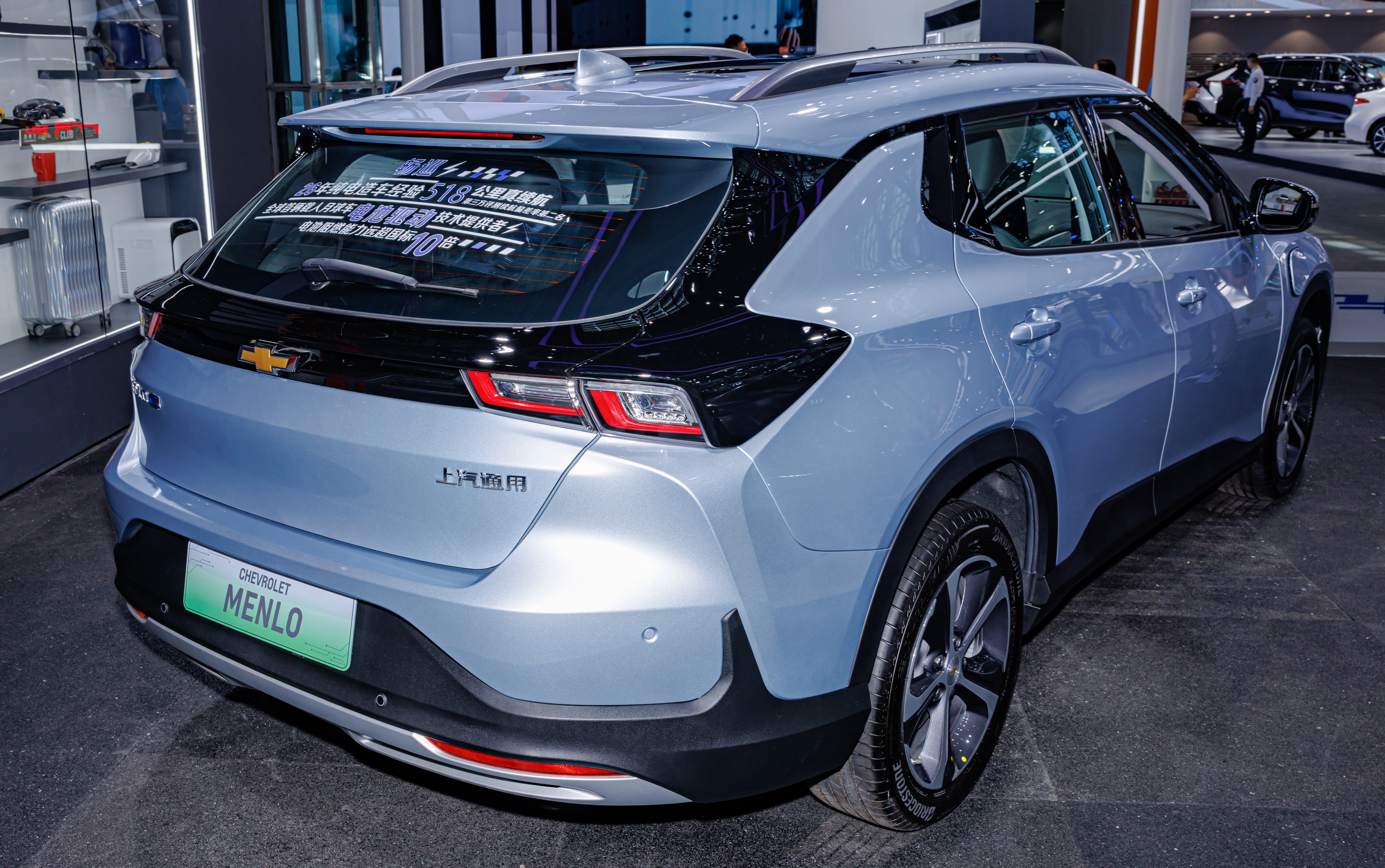
Rear view

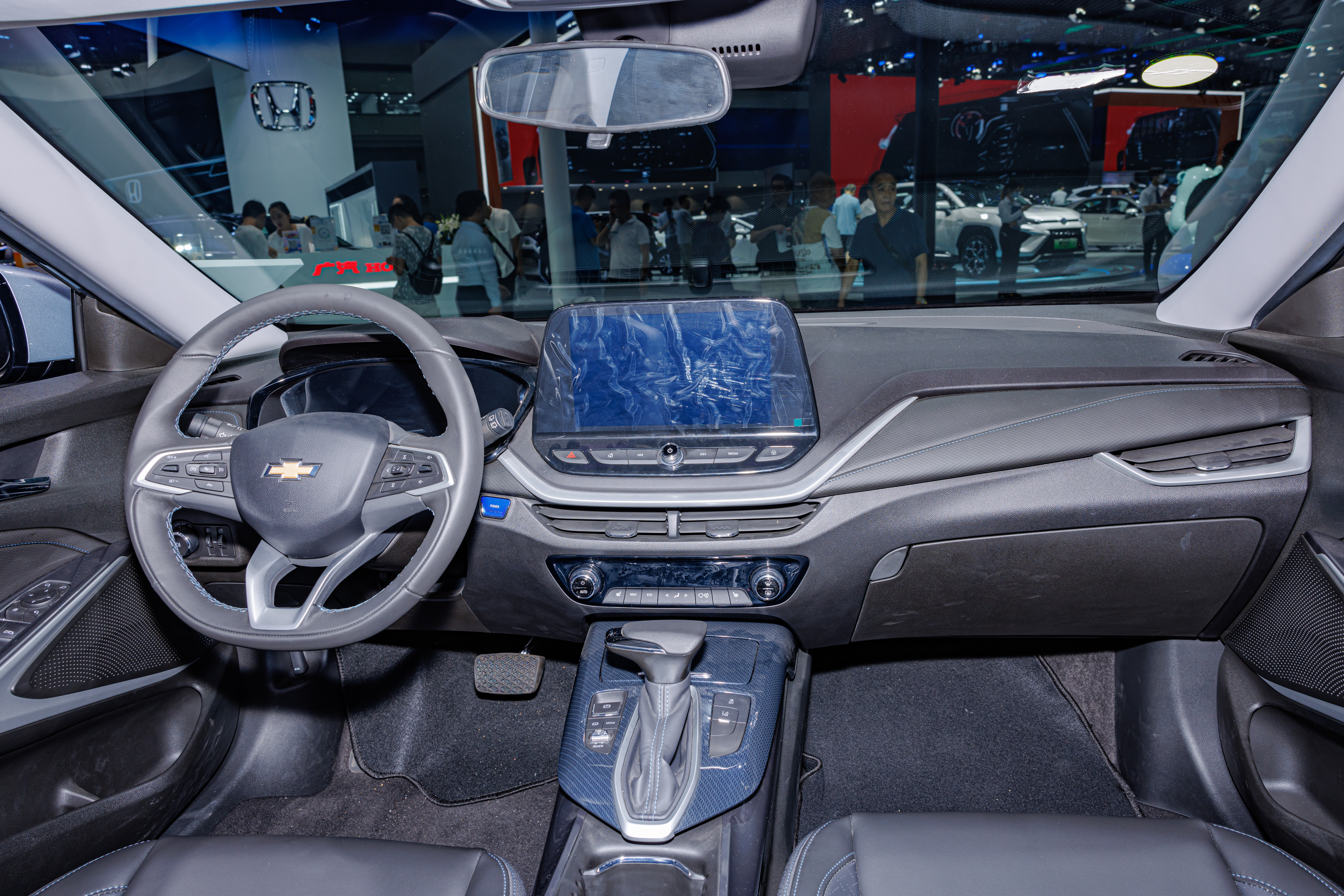
Interior

The Chevrolet Menlo is based on the Chevrolet FNR-X concept shown at the 2017 Auto Shanghai show. The production version of the Menlo debuted at a gala event in Hefei, Anhui on November 8, 2019, and was also shown at the 2019 Auto Guangzhou show. Pre-ordering began in December, and deliveries started on February 20, 2020.

The Chinese government provides a subsidy of up to 100,000 yuan (approximately US$14,250), making the Menlo the lowest-priced compact electric crossover in China.

Unlike the rest of the Chevrolet's models, the Menlo has a unique trim level naming scheme, which includes Starshare, Galaxy, Nebula, and Starlux. It also features three driving modes (standard, sport, and economy) and three levels of energy recycling.

== Powertrain ==
The Menlo has a lithium-ion battery, with 52.5 kWh capacity and a range of up to 410 km (255 mi) on the NEDC when it debuted. It supplies electricity to a motor that provided up to 110 kW (148 hp; 150 PS) of power and 350 N⋅m (258 lb⋅ft) of torque. This battery is also used in the Buick Velite 6 Plus.

For 2022, the battery pack was upgraded to 61.1 kWh capacity and the motor to 130 kW (174 hp; 177 PS) of power. The range was also increased to 518 km (322 mi).

== Sales ==
Year	China
2020	1,578
2021	3,020
2022	6,985
2023	5,419
2024	1,053
2025	104
