= Chery Fulwin A9 =

Mid-size sedan

Overview
- Manufacturer: Chery
- Model code: E05
- Production: 2026–present
- Assembly: China: Wuhu, Anhui
- Designer: Under the lead of Pierre Fengyou Gong

Body and chassis
- Class: Mid-size car
- Body style: 4-door sedan; 5-door station wagon
- Layout: EV: Front-motor, front-wheel-drive; PHEV/EREV: Front-engine + Rear-motor, rear-wheel-drive; Front-engine + Dual-motors, four-wheel-drive
- Platform: E0X

Powertrain
- Engine: 1.5 L ACTECO Gen.5 turbo I4 (generator)
- Electric motor: Permanent magnet synchronous
- Power output: 239 hp (178 kW; 242 PS)
- Hybrid drivetrain: Series plug-in hybrid
- Battery: EV: 70.11 kWh Rhino E LFP
- Electric range: 655 km (407 mi) (CLTC)

Dimensions
- Wheelbase: 2,928 mm (115.3 in)
- Length: 4,930 mm (194.1 in)
- Width: 1,908 mm (75.1 in)
- Height: 1,480 mm (58.3 in)
- Curb weight: 1,850–1,858 kg (4,079–4,096 lb)

The Chery Fulwin A9 (Chinese: 奇瑞风云A9; pinyin: Qíruì Fēngyún A9) is a battery electric and plug-in hybrid mid-size sedan produced by Chery since 2026.

== Overview ==
=== Chery Fulwin E05 Concept ===
The design of the Fulwin A9 was first previewed as the Chery Fulwin E05 Concept shown during 2024 Auto Chengdu.

=== Production model ===
Rear view

The production of the Fulwin A9 was first revealed as a prototype car at the launch of Auto Guangzhou in November 2025.

It has a drag coefficient of 0.223C_{d}. The interior features an 8.88-inch digital instrument panel and a 15.6-inch central infotainment touchscreen display; standard variants utilize a Qualcomm Snapdragon 8155 SoC, while higher variants use a Mediatek MT8678 SoC to power the system. It has a 1080-watt 23-speaker 7.1.4.2 surround sound system.

The Fulwin A9 has available with the optional Falcon 700 ADAS system, which has a sensor suite consisting of 1 LiDAR, 3 mmWave radars, 11 cameras, and 12 ultrasonic sensors.

== Powertrain ==
The battery electric Fulwin A9 is powered by a 239 hp (178 kW; 242 PS) front motor and a 70.11 kWh LFP battery providing of CLTC range, and can recharge from 30–80% time in 20 minutes. The motor has a top speed of 22,000rpm, and Chery claims it has a peak efficiency of 95%.

Specifications
Battery		Power	Torque	Range	Top speed
Type	Weight	Power	Torque	CLTC	Top speed
70.11 kWh LFP	501 kg (1,105 lb)	239 hp (178 kW; 242 PS)	275 N⋅m (203 lb⋅ft)	655 km (407 mi)	180 km/h (112 mph)

== Sales ==
The Fulwin A9 received 18,173 pre-orders within 72 hours of pre-sales opening on 9 July 2026.
