= Chery Fulwin T9L =

Mid-size crossover SUV

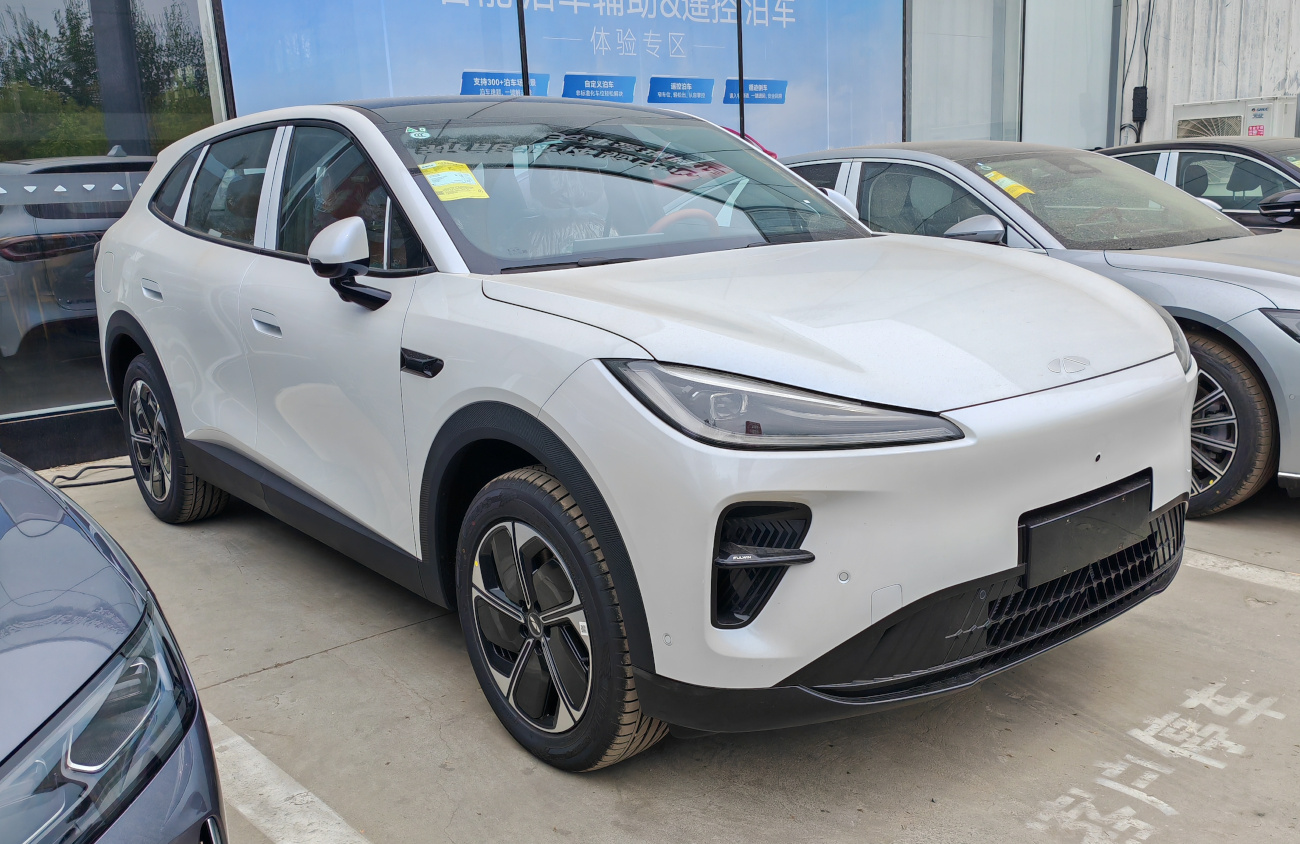

Overview
- Manufacturer: Chery
- Model code: E06
- Production: 2026–present
- Assembly: China: Wuhu, Anhui

Body and chassis
- Class: Mid-size SUV
- Body style: 5-door crossover SUV
- Platform: E0X

Dimensions
- Wheelbase: 2,920 mm (115.0 in)
- Length: 4,870 mm (191.7 in)
- Width: 1,930 mm (76.0 in)
- Height: 1,710 mm (67.3 in)

The Chery Fulwin T9L (Chinese: 奇瑞风云T9L; pinyin: Qíruì Fēngyún T9L) is a battery electric and plug-in hybrid mid-size SUV produced by Chery since 2025.

== Overview ==
=== Chery Fulwin E06 concept ===
The design of the Fulwin T9L was first previewed by the Chery Fulwin E06 concept shown during Auto Beijing 2024.

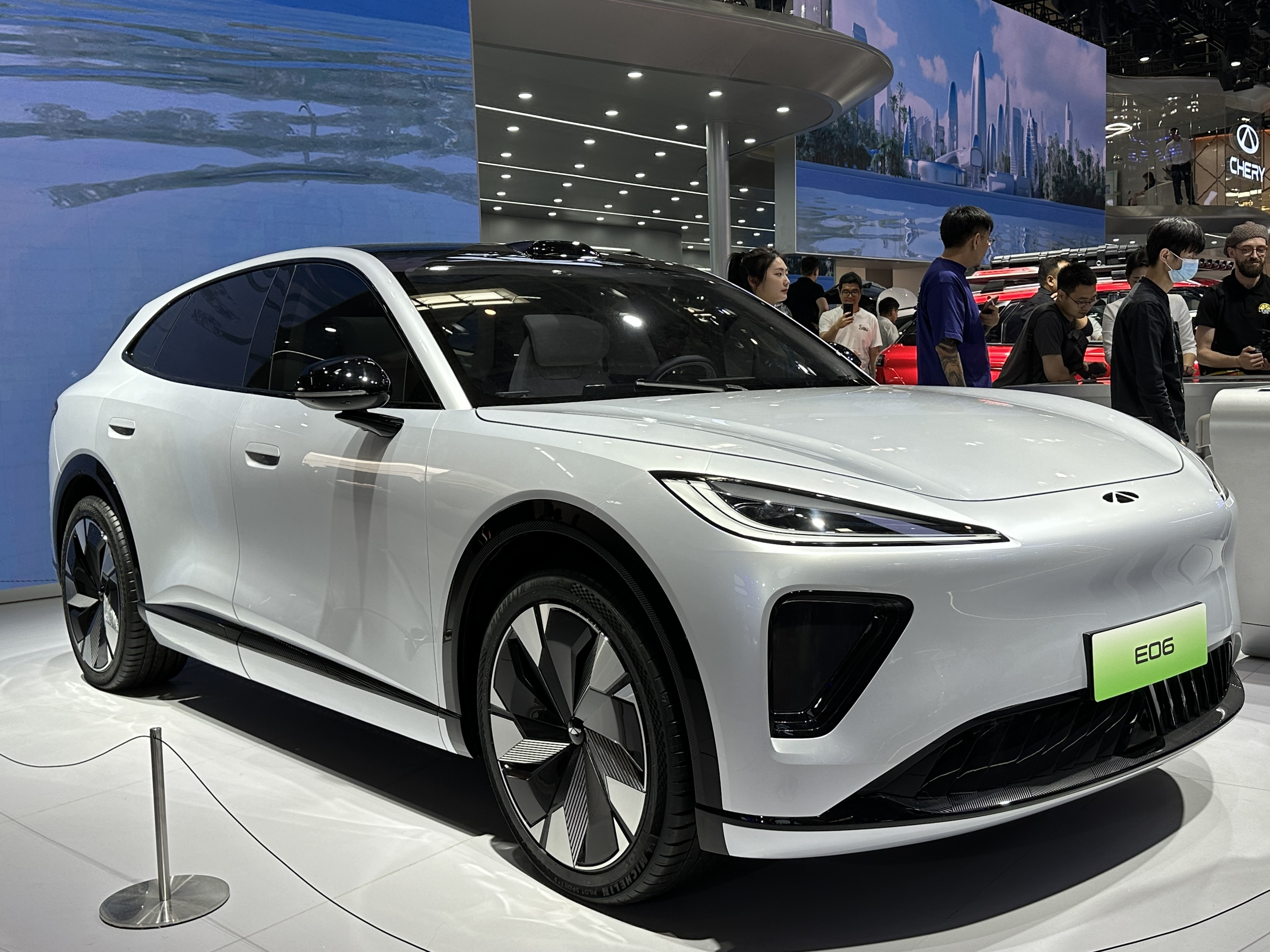
Chery Fulwin E06 concept

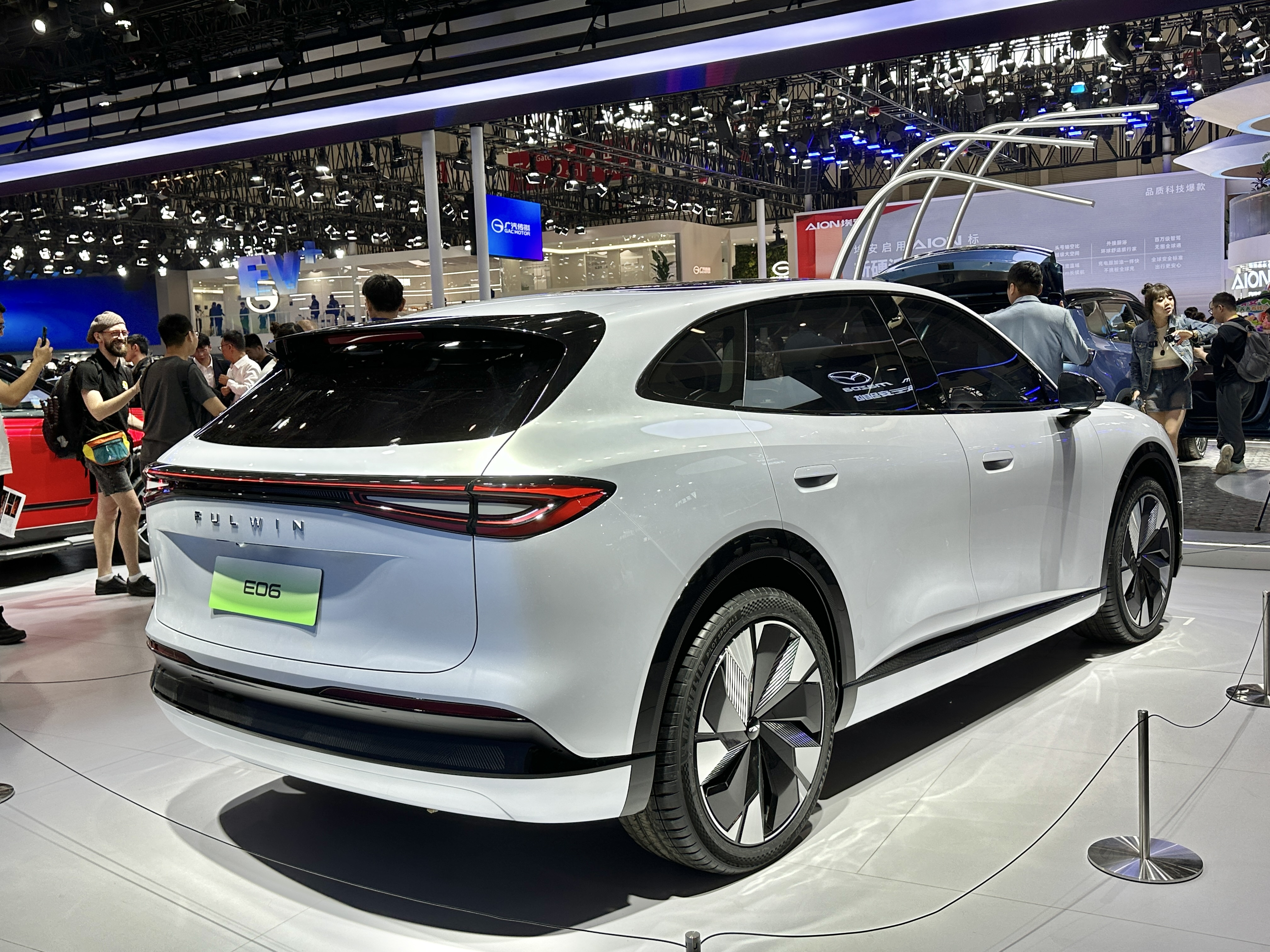
Rear view

=== Production model ===
The production Fulwin T9L was first revealed as a prototype car at the launch of Auto Guangzhou in November 2025. and sales were commenced in China on 13 April 2026.

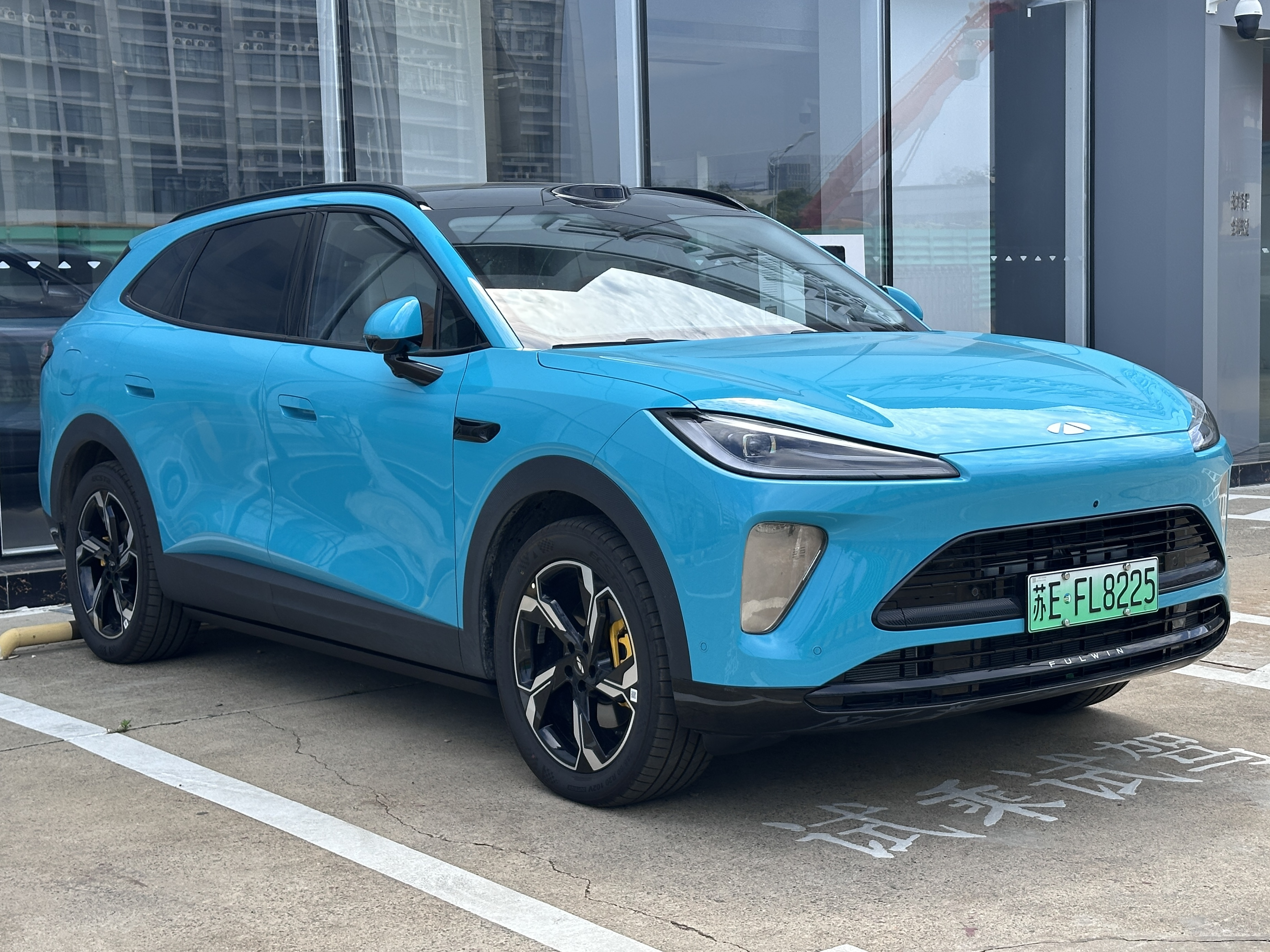
Chery Fulwin T9L

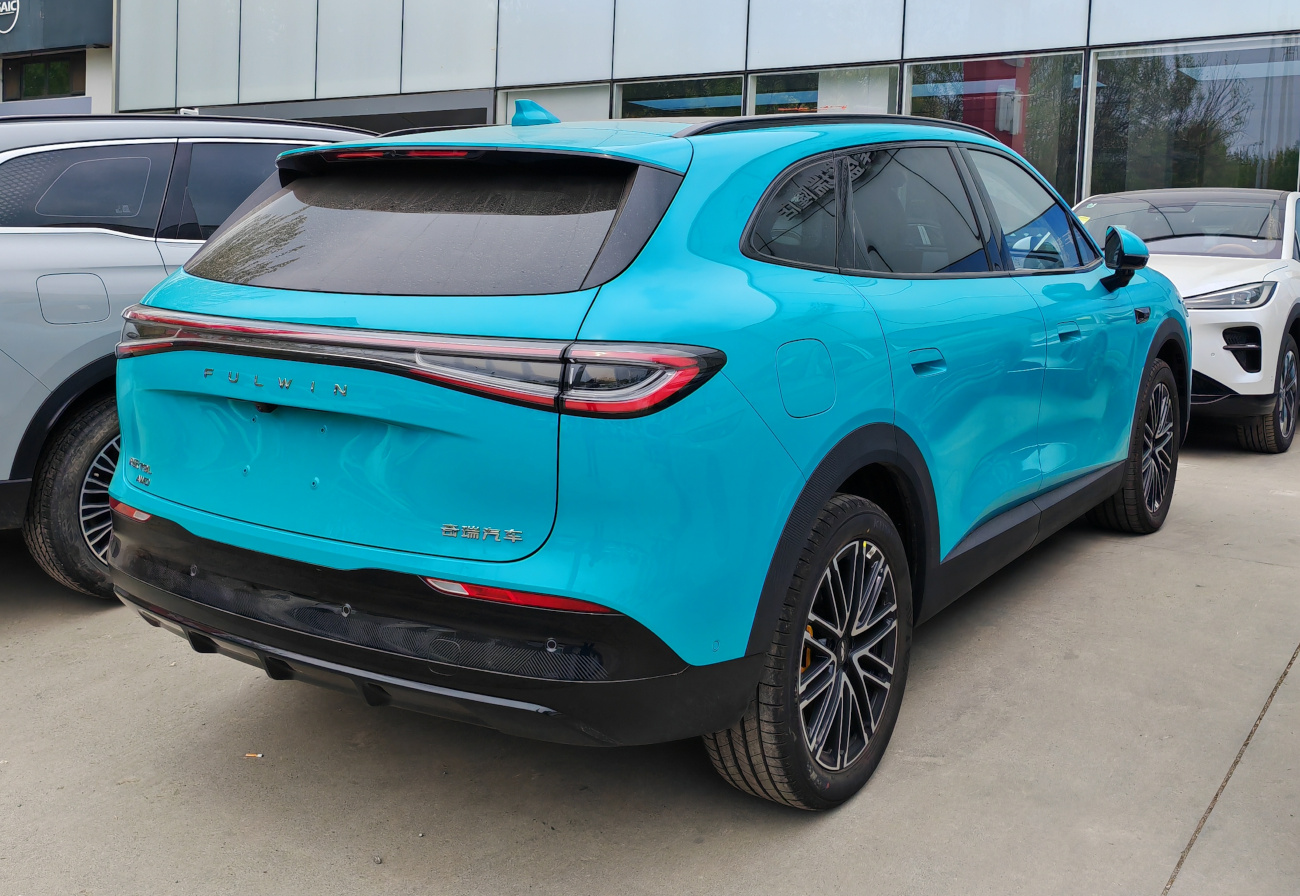
Rear view
