= BYD Xia =

Plug-in hybrid minivan

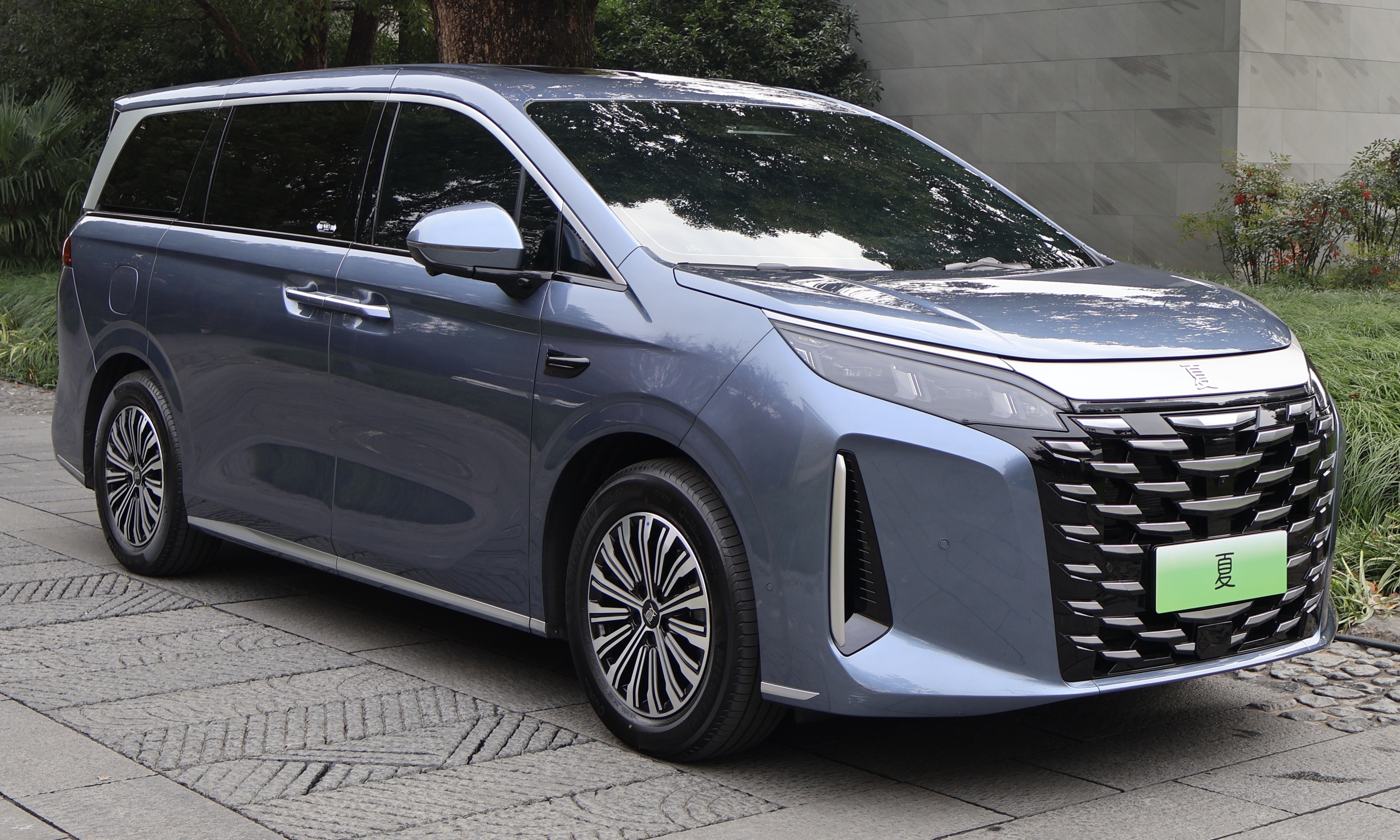

Overview
- Manufacturer: BYD Auto
- Also called: BYD M9 (export); BYD eMax 9 DM-i (Philippines); Linghui M9 (2026–present)
- Production: January 2025 – present
- Assembly: China: Hefei, Anhui
- Designer: Under the lead of Wolfgang Egger

Body and chassis
- Class: Large minivan
- Body style: 5-door minivan
- Layout: Front-engine, front-motor, front-wheel drive
- Related: Denza D9

Powertrain
- Engine: Petrol plug-in hybrid: 1.5 L I4 turbo
- Electric motor: 200 kW permanent magnet synchronous
- Transmission: E-CVT
- Hybrid drivetrain: Plug-in hybrid
- Battery: 20.4 kWh LFP BYD Blade; 36.6 kWh LFP BYD Blade
- Range: 1,060 km (660 mi) (NEDC)
- Electric range: 100–180 km (62–112 mi) (CLTC)

Dimensions
- Wheelbase: 3,045 mm (119.9 in)
- Length: 5,145 mm (202.6 in)
- Width: 1,970 mm (77.6 in)
- Height: 1,805 mm (71.1 in)
- Curb weight: 2,470–2,650 kg (5,445–5,842 lb)

The BYD Xia (Chinese: 比亚迪夏) is a plug-in hybrid minivan manufactured by BYD Auto since 2025. Named after the Xia dynasty, the first dynasty in traditional Chinese historiography, it is part of BYD's Dynasty Series that is marketed through Dynasty Network dealerships. Outside China, it is marketed as the BYD M9 or eMax 9.

== Overview ==
The BYD Xia was launched in August 2024 at the Chengdu Motor Show, and was launched and went on sale on 8 January 2025.

The Xia has the option of eight, seven, six and four-seat layouts. It is equipped with the DiSus-C damping body control system, and BYD's fifth-generation plug-in hybrid system marketed as DM-i 5.0.

The vehicle is equipped with the fifth-generation DM plug-in hybrid powertrain paired with a 1.5-litre turbocharged engine. Its achieves a rating of 5.3 L/100 km (44 mpg_{‑US}) on the NEDC cycle, and the combined cruising range on a full gas tank and fully charged battery is 1,060 kilometres (660 mi). The Xia comes standard with the 5R12V DiPilot 100 advanced driver assistance system with LiDAR and Nvidia Orin-X system-on-a-chip, which has up to 29 sensors in the entire vehicle, including highway and expressway piloting, intelligent parking assistance, emergency braking and many other driving assistance functions. Software functions will be gradually released in February 2025.

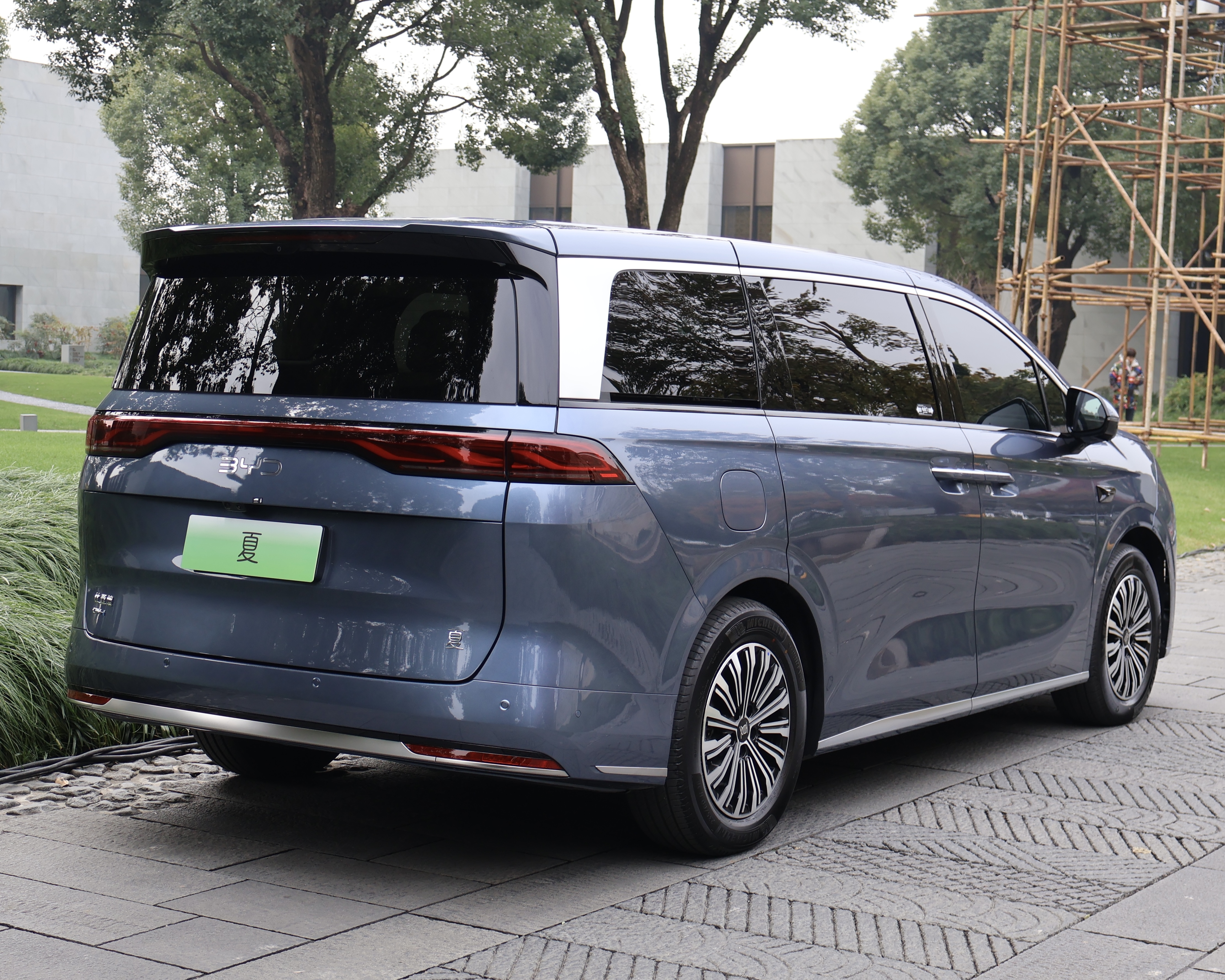
Rear view

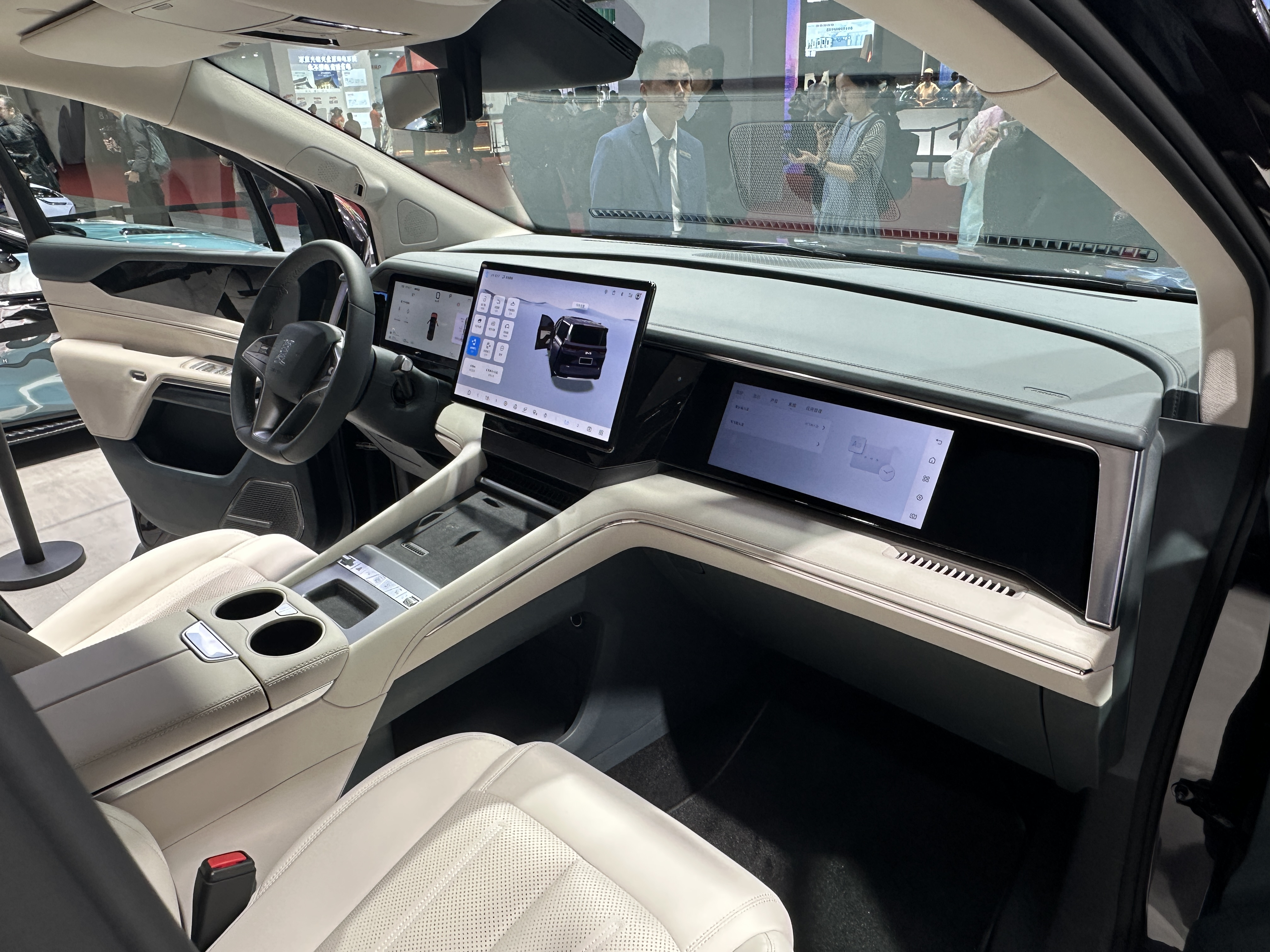
Interior

== Export markets ==
=== Australia ===
The Xia is marketed as the M9 in Australia and went on sale on 19 September 2026. It is available with two variants: Dynamic (20.4 kWh) and Premium (36.6 kWh). The Dynamic variant is an 8-seat configuration while the Premium variant is a 7-seater configuration.

=== Brunei ===
The Xia is marketed as the M9 in Brunei and was launched on 6 February 2026, as the first country to launch the right-hand drive model during the debut. It is only available in sole variant (36.6 kWh) with 7-seater configuration.

=== Philippines ===
The Xia is marketed as the eMax 9 DM-i in the Philippines and was launched on 23 October 2025. It is available with two variants: Advanced (20.4 kWh) and Premium (36.6 kWh), both variants are 7-seater configuration.

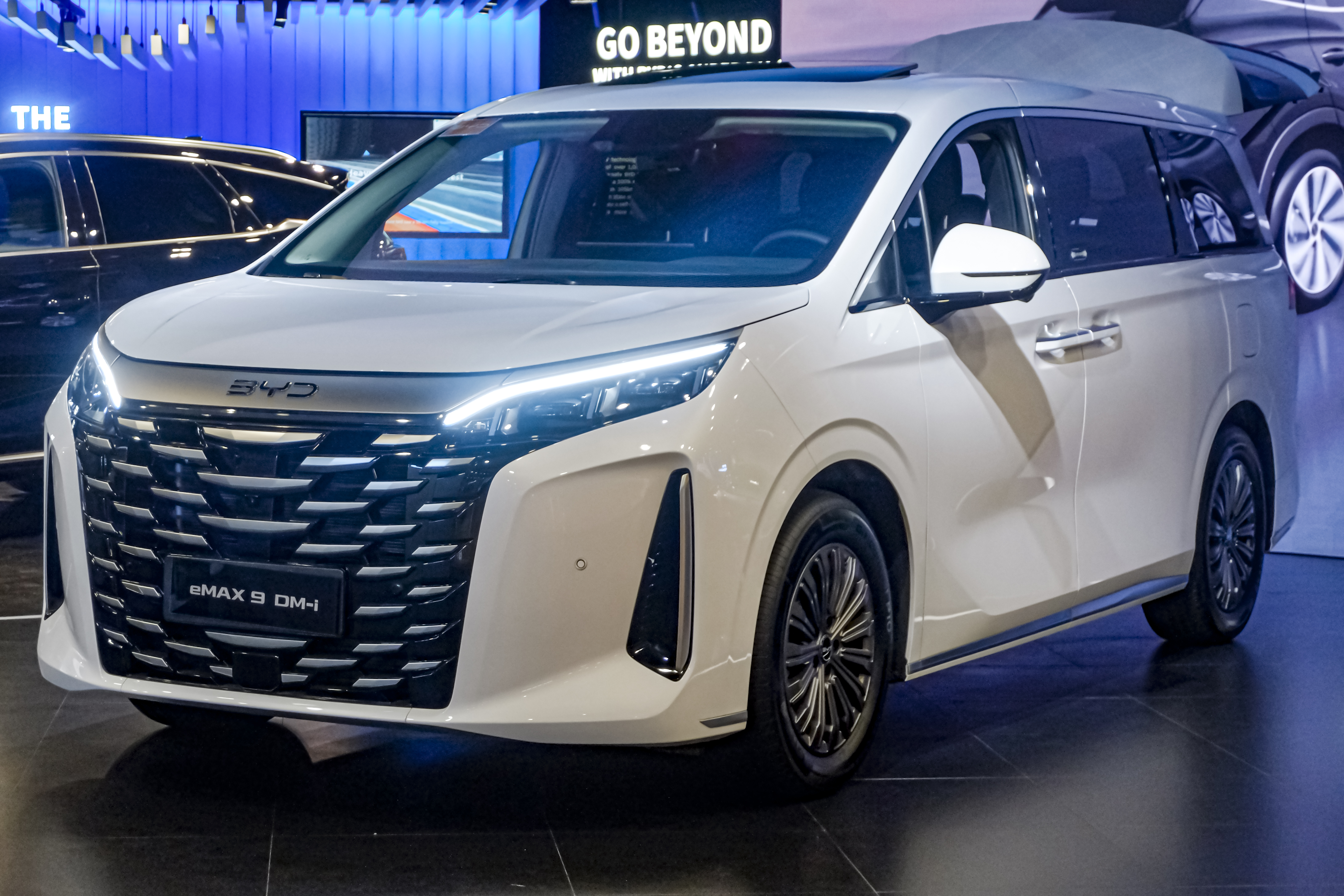
BYD eMax 9 DM-i

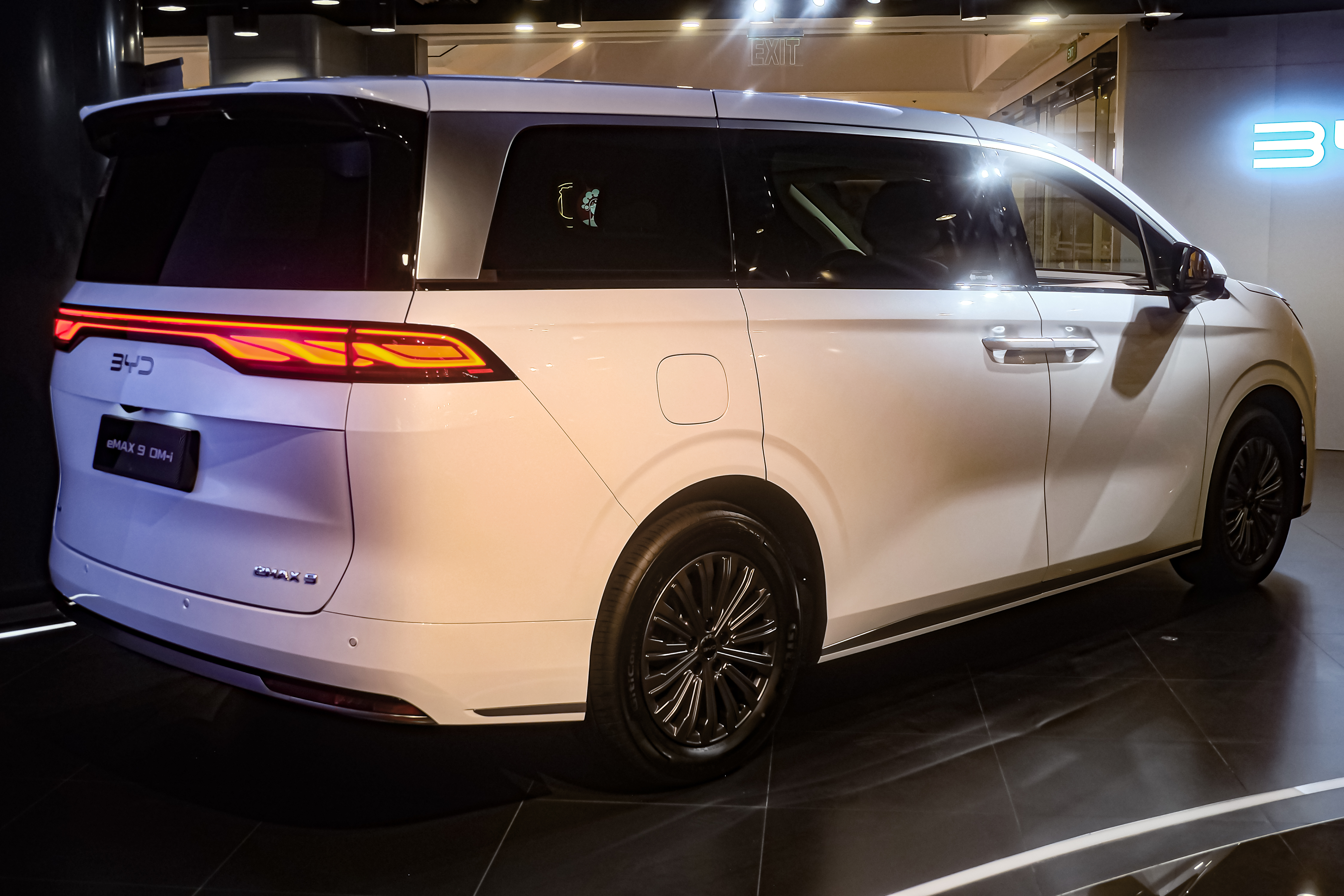
Rear view

=== Vietnam ===
The Xia is marketed as the M9 in Vietnam and was launched on 10 November 2025. It is available with two variants: Advanced (20.4 kWh) and Premium (36.6 kWh).

== Linghui M9 ==
Images of a Linghui M9 was revealed by the MIIT on January 9, 2026. Linghui named the minivan after the export version of a BYD Xia, Linghui M9 is the first BYD's minivan to be aligned with BYD's ride-hailing services.

== Safety ==
ANCAP test results BYD M9 (2026, aligned with Euro NCAP)
Test	Score
Overall:	5 /5 stars
Safe driving	75%
Crash avoidance	78%
Crash protection	89%
Post crash	100%

== Sales ==
In its debut month of January 2025, BYD delivered 10,003 units of the Xia.

Year	China		
Year	Xia	M9	Total
2024	10	—	10
2025	26,795	261	27,056

== See also ==
- List of BYD Auto vehicles
