= Hongqi H6 =

Mid-size liftback

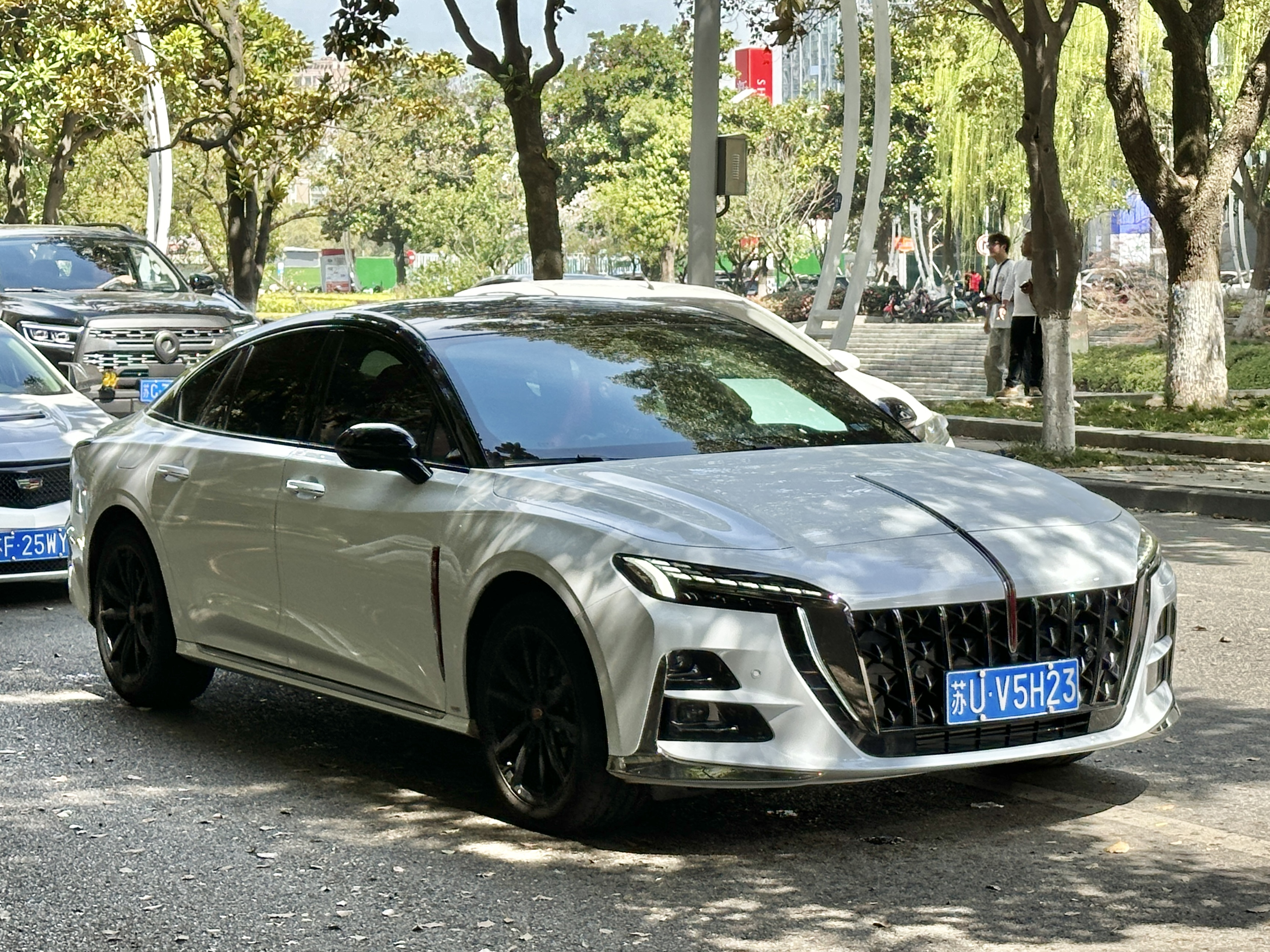

Overview
- Manufacturer: Hongqi (FAW Group)
- Production: 2023–present
- Assembly: China: Changchun, Jilin

Body and chassis
- Class: Mid-size car (D)
- Body style: 5-door liftback

Powertrain
- Engine: Petrol: 2.0 L CA4GC20TD-33 turbo I4
- Transmission: Aisin AWF8F45 8-speed automatic

Dimensions
- Wheelbase: 2,920 mm (115.0 in)
- Length: 4,990 mm (196.5 in)
- Width: 1,880 mm (74.0 in)
- Height: 1,455 mm (57.3 in)
- Curb weight: 2,115 kg (4,663 lb)

The Hongqi H6 is a mid-size liftback produced by Chinese automobile manufacturer Hongqi, a subsidiary of FAW Group.

== Overview ==
Rear view

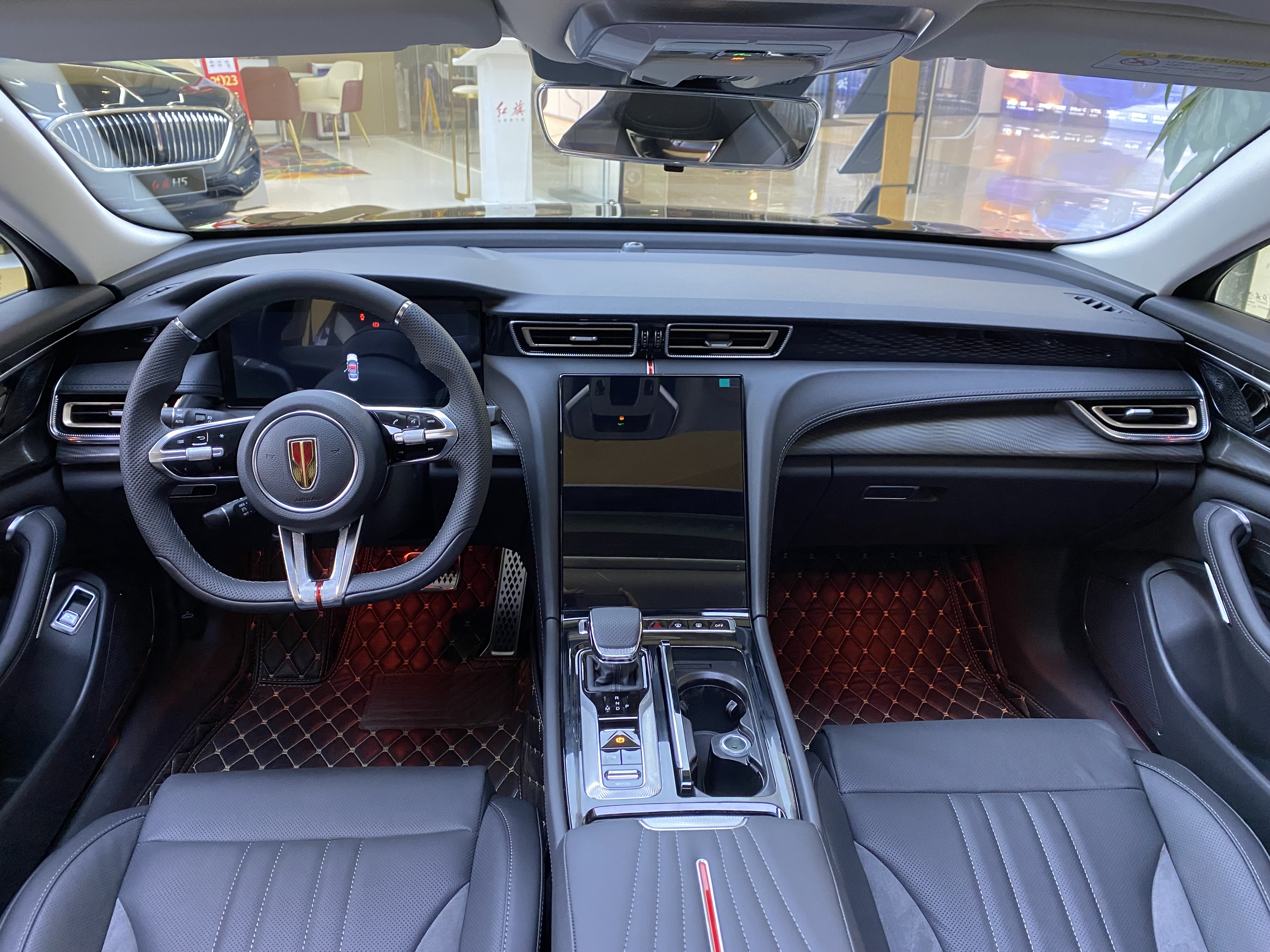
Interior

The H6 has front-wheel drive and is powered by a 2.0-liter turbocharged engine with two power variants available: the low-power version produces 165 kW (221 hp) and a peak torque of 340 N⋅m (251 lb⋅ft), allowing it to accelerate from 0 to 100 km/h (62 mph) in 7.8 seconds. The high-power version delivers 185 kW (248 hp) and a peak torque of 380 N⋅m (280 lb⋅ft), enabling it to achieve 0-100 km/h acceleration in 6.8 seconds. Both versions are paired with an 8-speed Aisin automatic transmission.

The H6 has a Continuous Damping Control (CDC) suspension system, which enables the vehicle to continuously read multiple dynamic parameters at intervals of 2 milliseconds to adjust the firmness of the shock absorbers in real time to enhance the driving comfort and provide body support during high-speed and continuous cornering, further improving stability.

The interior has carbon fiber trims and features a 12.3-inch LCD instrument cluster. It is also equipped with paddle shifters and a heads-up display (HUD).

== Sales ==
Year	China
2023	8,900
2024	14,407
2025	16,683
