= JAC Van Baolu =

Battery electric van

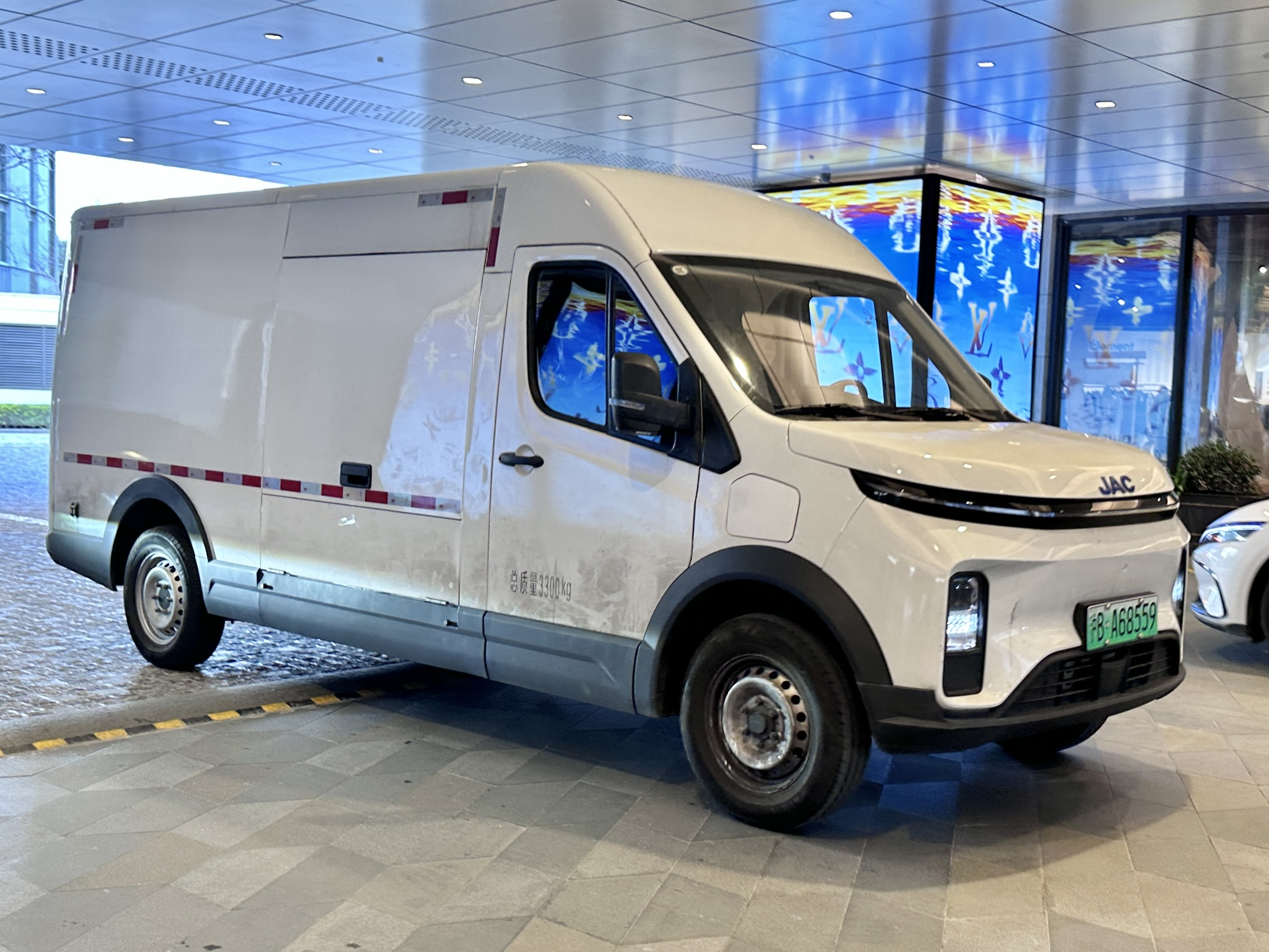
- The JAC Van Baolu in Shanghai.

Overview
- Manufacturer: JAC Group
- Production: 2024–present
- Assembly: China

Body and chassis
- Class: Light commercial vehicle
- Body style: 4-door van
- Layout: Rear-engine, rear-wheel-drive

Powertrain
- Electric motor: Permanent magnet synchronous electric motor

Dimensions
- Wheelbase: 3,380 mm (133.1 in) (V8); 3,700 mm (145.7 in) (V10)
- Length: 5,460 mm (215.0 in) (V8); 5,780 mm (227.6 in) (V10)
- Width: 1,860 mm (73.2 in)
- Height: 2,340 mm (92.1 in) (V8); 2,050 mm (80.7 in) (V10)
- Curb weight: 1,500–4,490 kg (3,307–9,899 lb)

The JAC Van Baolu (Chinese: Van 宝路) is a battery electric van designed and produced by the Chinese automaker JAC Group since 2024.

== Overview ==
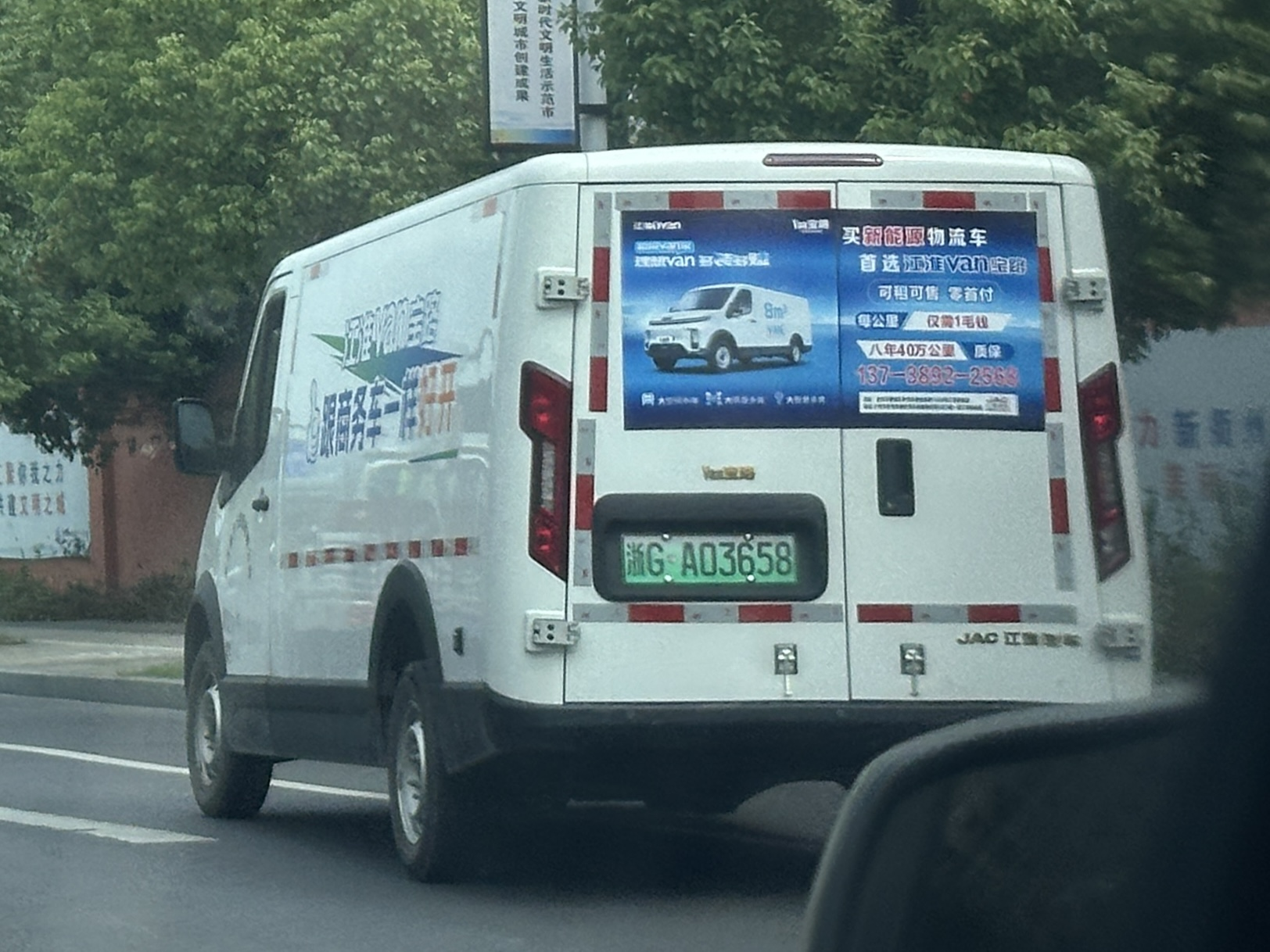
Rear view

Two variants of the Van Baolu is available, with the short wheelbase variant named as the Van Baolu V8, and the long wheelbase variant named as the Van Baolu V10. The Van Baolu is equipped with a CATL supplied 53.58kWh battery with a CLTC range of more than 280 kilometers. The platform also supports ultra-fast charging, which can achieve 30% to 80% state of charge in less than 30 minutes. The powertrain i a 77 kW high-efficiency electric motor with a maximum power output of 230 Nm.
