= EV3 (disambiguation) =

EV3 may refer to:

- EV3, a 1997 album by American female vocal group En Vogue
- EV3 The Pilgrims Route, a long-distance cycling route in Europe
- JMEV EV3, a battery electric city car
- Kia EV3, a battery electric subcompact crossover SUV
- Lego Mindstorms EV3, the third generation of LEGO's Mindstorms robotics kit line
