= JMEV Xiaoqilin =

Battery electric city car

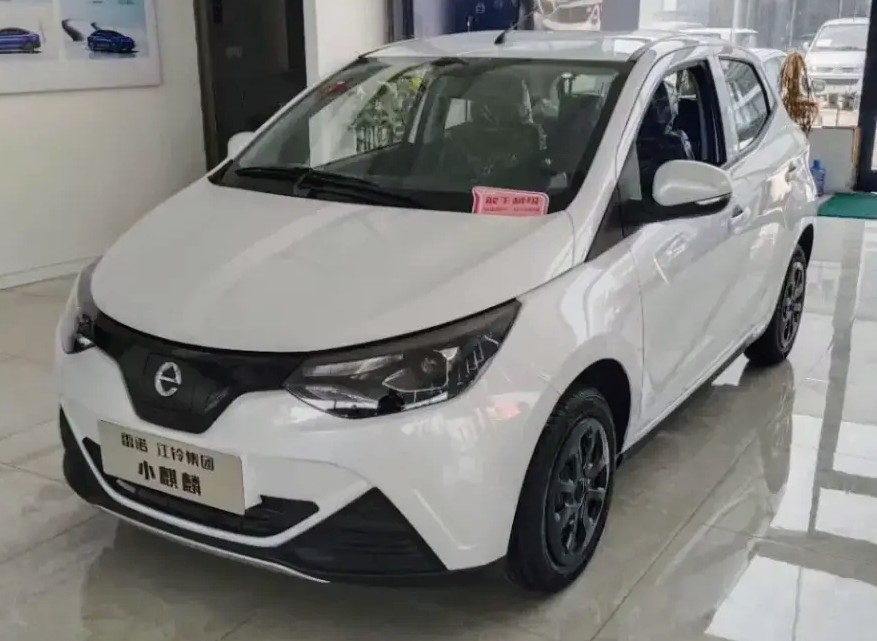

Overview
- Manufacturer: JMEV
- Also called: JMEV EV2; Emova Easy
- Production: 2022–present
- Assembly: China: Nanchang (JMEV)

Body and chassis
- Class: City car (A)
- Body style: 5-door hatchback
- Layout: Front motor, front-wheel drive
- Related: JMEV EV3

Powertrain
- Electric motor: 26–30 kW PMSM
- Power output: 35–40 hp (26–30 kW; 35–41 PS)
- Battery: 15.9 kWh LFP Sunwoda; 15.88 kWh LFP Farasis
- Electric range: 175–201 km (109–125 mi) CLTC

Dimensions
- Wheelbase: 2,340 mm (92.1 in)
- Length: 3,500 mm (137.8 in)
- Width: 1,646 mm (64.8 in)
- Height: 1,460 mm (57.5 in)
- Curb weight: 890–930 kg (1,962–2,050 lb)

The JMEV Xiaoqilin (Chinese: 江铃小麒麟), also known as the EV2, is a battery electric city car produced by JMEV, a joint venture between Renault and Chinese manufacturer Jiangling Group, which produces and markets electric cars in China. In Brazil, the car is badged Emova Easy.

== Overview ==
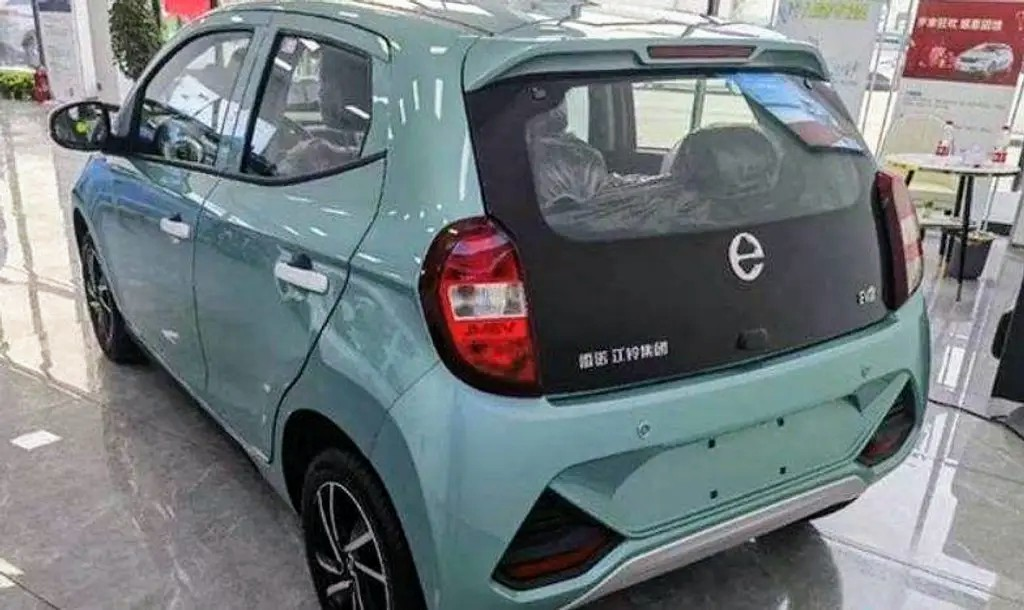
Rear view

Originally called the EV2 under the EVeasy sub-brand, it has five doors and can accommodate four people. The dashboard is rudimentary, the console having buttons dedicated to the air conditioning and the audio system without a touch screen. It has a rear cargo capacity of 105 L (3.7 cu ft), expanding to 750 L (26.5 cu ft) with the seats folded down. The chassis uses 1500MPa hot-formed steel to reinforce key safety structures in the front bumper, door sills, and B-pillar. It has a turning radius of 4.9 m (16 ft).

The 2027 model year EV2 was launched on 10 September 2026 with two variants. It has a 10.1-inch central infotainment display with Carplay support and a 5-inch digital instrument panel. The dashboard features M6 screw locations for mounting accessories. It now uses a column shifter rather than a rotary selector, push-button start, cruise control, and an optional multifunction steering wheel. It is equipped with autohold, ABS, TCS, EPS, optional electronic parking brake, comfort and sport power steering modes, and projector beam headlights with shutoff delay timer.

=== Powertrain ===
The original 2022 model has a CLTC cruising range of 175 km (109 mi).

The 2026 and 2027 model years are powered by a 15.88 kWh air-cooled LFP battery providing 201 kilometres (125 mi) of CLTC range and can be recharged from 30–80% in 35 minutes with a peak charge rate of 20 kW DC, or in 3 hours on AC power. It is propelled by a 40 horsepower (30 kW; 41 PS) front motor with 85 N⋅m (63 lb⋅ft) of torque, allowing for a 50 km/h (31 mph) time of 5.5 seconds and a top speed of 100 km/h (62 mph).

Specifications
Year	Battery		Motor	Power	Torque	Range	30–80% charge	0–50 km/h (31 mph)	Top speed	Kerb weight
Year	Type	Weight	Front	Power	Torque	CLTC	30–80% charge	0–50 km/h (31 mph)	Top speed	Kerb weight
2025–present	15.88 kWh LFP Farasis	125 kg (276 lb)	30 kW TZ160XJE5 PMSM	40 hp (30 kW; 41 PS)	85 N⋅m (63 lb⋅ft)	201 km (125 mi)	35 min	5.5 sec	100 km/h (62 mph)	880 kg (1,940 lb)
2023–26	15.86 kWh LFP Sunwoda		26 kW TZ144X09A PMSM	34 hp (25 kW; 34 PS)	84 N⋅m (62 lb⋅ft)	201 km (125 mi)	—	6.7 sec	100 km/h (62 mph)	890 kg (1,962 lb)
2022–23	15.86 kWh LFP Sunwoda		26 kW TZ144X09A PMSM	34 hp (25 kW; 34 PS)	84 N⋅m (62 lb⋅ft)	175 km (109 mi)	—	6.7 sec	100 km/h (62 mph)	930 kg (2,050 lb)

== Sales ==
Year	China
2022	779
2023	2,940
2024	18,639
2025	16,876
