= LS Auto LEV 01 =

Battery electric compact crossover SUV

Overview
- Manufacturer: Longsheng Auto
- Also called: JMEV Yichi 05S (China); JMEV Ewind; LS Auto LEV-X (AWD)
- Production: 2024–present
- Assembly: China: Jingdezhen, Jiangxi

Body and chassis
- Class: Compact crossover SUV (C)
- Body style: 5-door coupe SUV
- Layout: Front-motor, front-wheel-drive
- Related: VinFast Limo Green

Powertrain
- Electric motor: Permanent magnet synchronous
- Power output: 150 kW (204 PS; 201 hp); 165 kW (224 PS; 221 hp) (JMEV Yichi 05S); 99 kW (135 PS; 133 hp) (Nepal)
- Battery: 56.31 kWh LFP (JMEV Yichi 05S); 67.12 kWh LFP; 70.38 kWh LFP (JMEV Yichi 05S)
- Electric range: 500 km (310 mi) (NEDC)
- Plug-in charging: 6.6 kW AC; 55 kW DC

Dimensions
- Wheelbase: 2,760–2,770 mm (108.7–109.1 in)
- Length: 4,640 mm (182.7 in)
- Width: 1,870 mm (73.6 in)
- Height: 1,655 mm (65.2 in)
- Curb weight: 1,880 kg (4,145 lb)

The LS Auto LEV 01 is a battery electric compact crossover SUV (C-segment) developed by Longsheng Auto, a subsidiary of Shanghai Launch Automotive Technology.

In China, it is sold by JMEV as the Yichi 05S since September 2025.

== Markets ==
=== Brunei ===
The LS Auto LEV 01 was launched in Brunei on 18 November 2026 under JMEV brand as the Ewind and it is offered in single variant (powered with 70.38 kWh battery and 600km of driving range).

=== Nepal ===
The LS Auto LEV 01 was introduced in Nepal in November 2024 as the first model by the brand. Sold by local importer Nexon Venture, it is available in two variants, SE and CE.
