= Landwind X2 =

Chinese subcompact crossover SUV

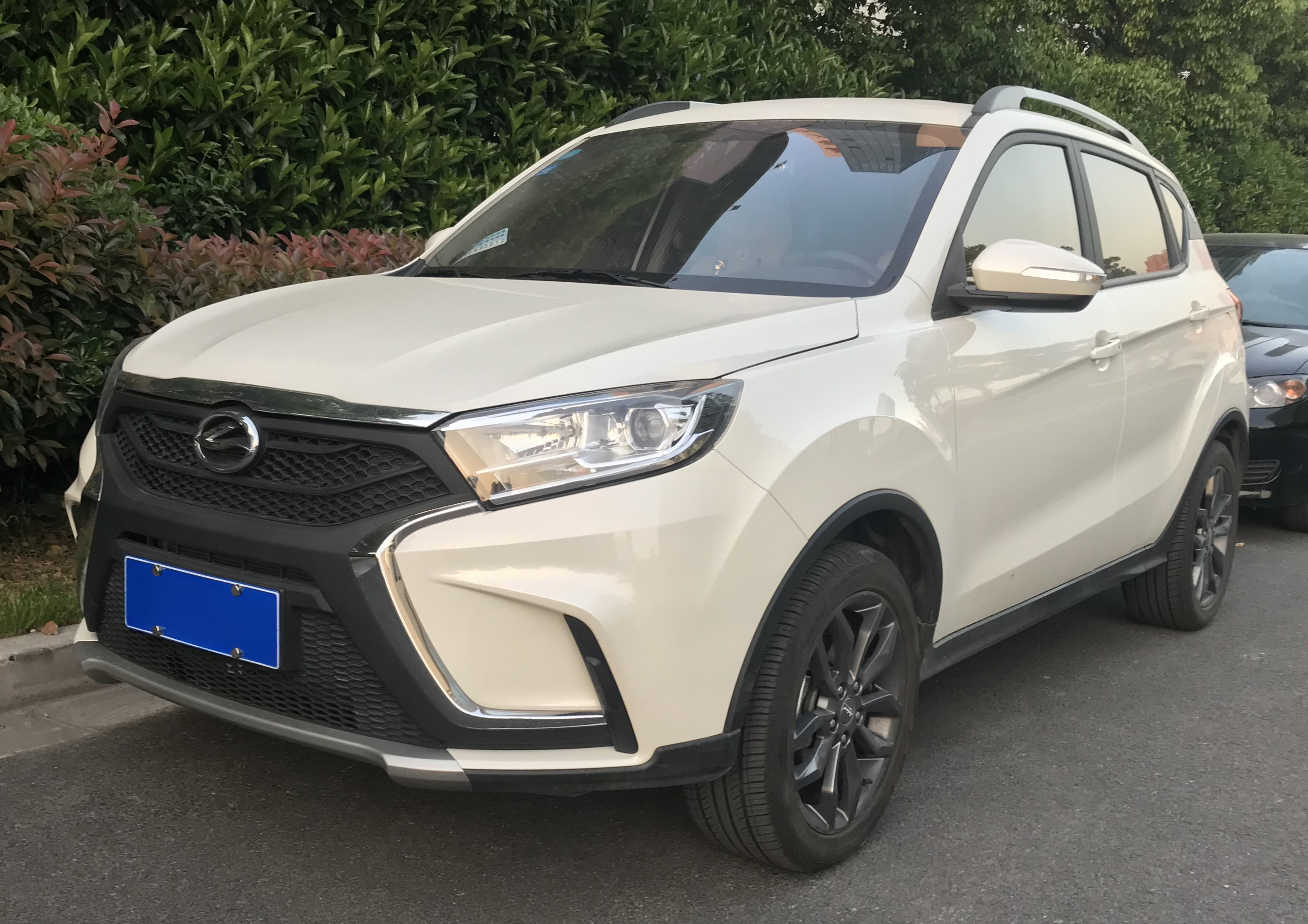

Overview
- Manufacturer: Landwind
- Also called: JMEV E400; EVeasy EX5
- Production: 2017–2022
- Assembly: China

Body and chassis
- Class: Subcompact crossover SUV (B)
- Body style: 5-door SUV
- Related: Changan CS35

Powertrain
- Engine: Petrol: 1.5 L I4 turbo; 2.0 L 4G63S4T I4
- Transmission: 8-speed automatic

Dimensions
- Wheelbase: 2,560 mm (101 in)
- Length: 4,160 mm (164 in)
- Width: 1,810 mm (71 in)
- Height: 1,670 mm (66 in)

The Landwind X2 is a subcompact crossover SUV produced by Chinese car manufacturer Landwind, an automotive brand owned by the Chinese automaker Jiangling Motor Holding, a joint venture between Aiways, Changan Auto and Jiangling Motors Corporation Group (JMCG). An electric version of the vehicle was also made and was sold as the JMEV E400 and EVeasy EX5.

== Overview ==
The Landwind X2 debuted on the 2017 Shanghai Auto Show and was launched on the Chinese car market in Q2 2017. The Landwind X2 subcompact CUV was positioned right under the Landwind X7 compact CUV, and pricing of the ranges from 63,800 yuan and ends at 88,800 yuan. Engine options for the Landwind X2 is a 1.6-liter engine with 125 hp (93 kW; 127 PS) and 150 N⋅m (111 lb⋅ft), mated to a five-speed manual transmission or a four-speed automatic transmission, powering the front wheels, with an additional 1.5-liter turbo engine added to the lineup later. It has a MacPherson strut front suspension, and a non-independent torsion beam rear suspension.

Unlike the unlicensed copy of a Landwind X7 resembles the Range Rover Evoque, the car is a licensed resemblance with Chang'an CS35/Oshan COS5° subcompact crossover, as both crossovers share the same platform from Changan. Landwind is a sub-brand of Jiangling Motors Holding, which was a joint venture by Jiangling Motors Group and Changan Auto before being joined by Aiways.

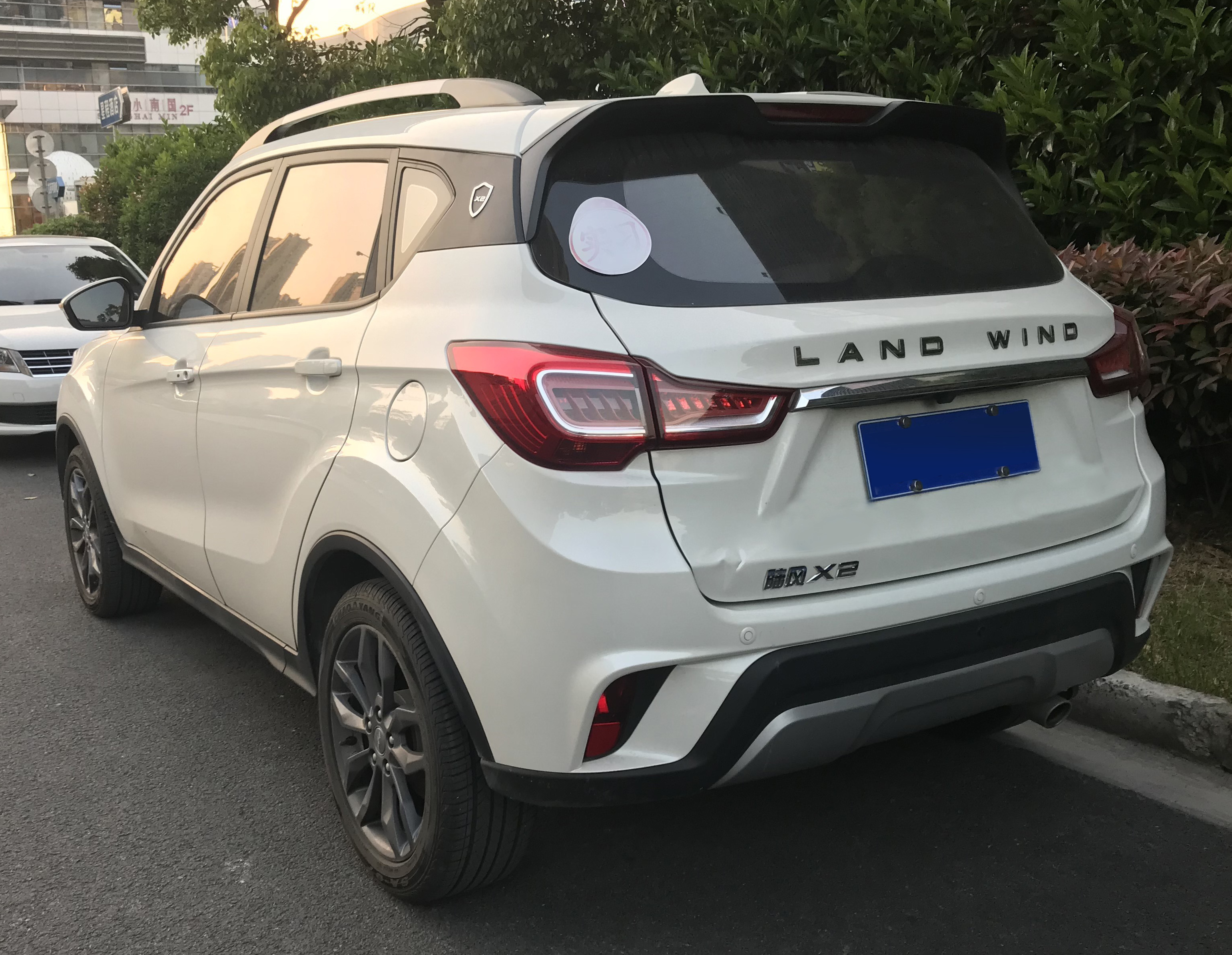
Landwind X2 rear

== JMEV E400 and EVeasy EX5 ==
EVeasy EX5
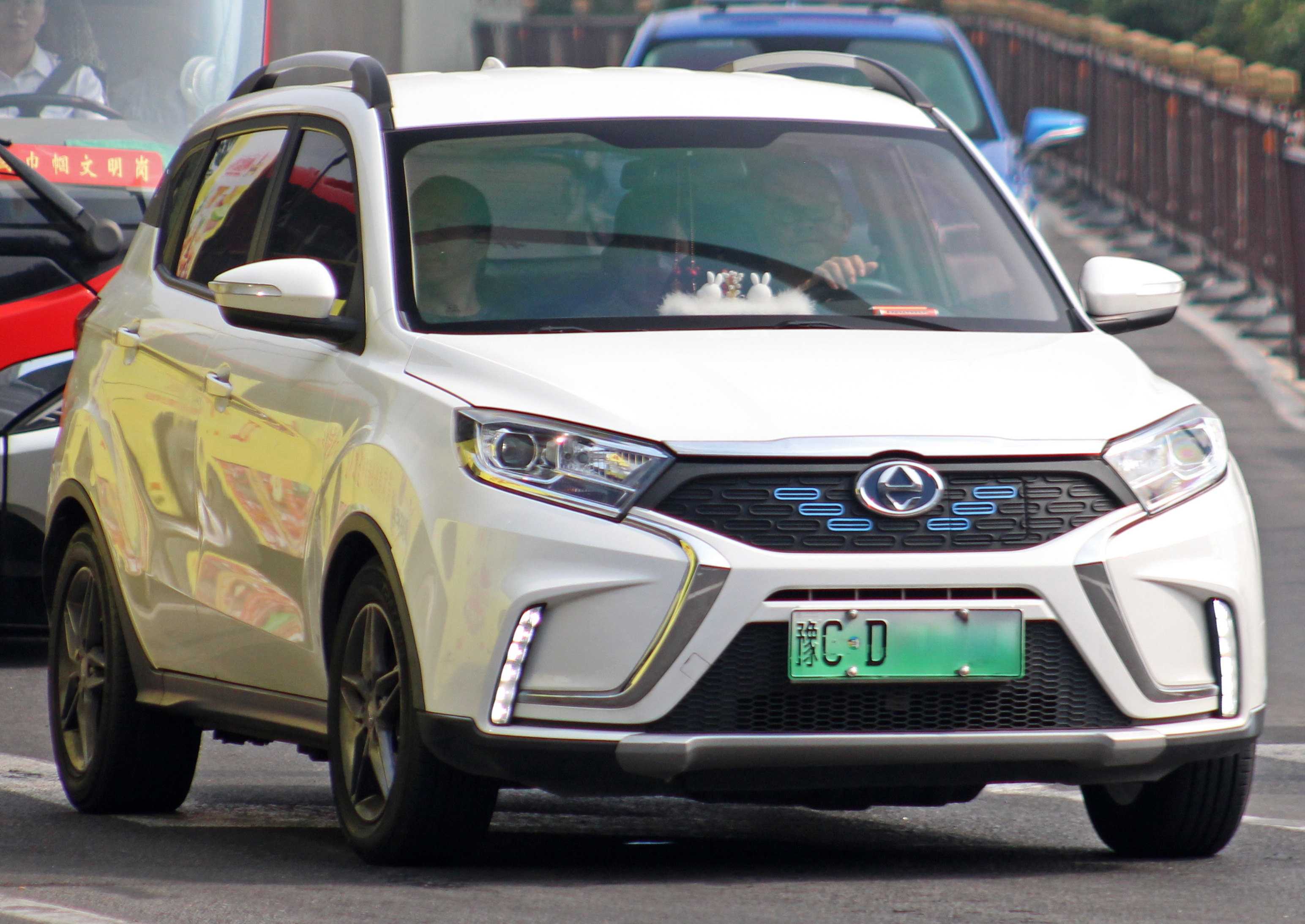

Overview
- Also called: JMEV E400; Spotgo A500
- Model years: 2018–2023

Body and chassis
- Layout: Front motor, front-wheel drive

Powertrain
- Electric motor: 50, 60, 90 kW permanent magnet synchronous
- Transmission: Single-speed gear reduction
- Battery: 41 kWh (E400); 55 kWh (EX5)
- Electric range: 252–310 km (157–193 mi) (E400) (CLTC); 405 km (252 mi) (EX5) (CLTC)

Dimensions
- Curb weight: 1,490–1,530 kilograms (3,280–3,370 lb)

The JMEV E400 is JMEV's first SUV. It is based on the Landwind X2 and has a battery pack of up to 41 kWh that supports fast charging. It has a choice of two electric motors, one delivering a power output of 50 kW (67 hp; 68 PS) and 200 N⋅m (148 lb⋅ft) of torque with a range of 310 kilometres (193 mi) and top speed of 100 km/h (62 mph), and the other produces 90 kW (121 hp; 122 PS) and 285 N⋅m (210 lb⋅ft) of torque and a range of 252 kilometres (157 mi) and a top speed of 120 km/h (75 mph).

It was rebranded as the EX5 under JMEV's new sub-brand EVeasy in September 2019 and fitted with a larger 55 kWh battery, a water-cooled permanent magnet synchronous motor outputting 60 kW (80 hp; 82 PS) and 220 N⋅m (162 lb⋅ft) of torque with range increasing to 405 kilometres (252 mi), and a top speed of 100 km/h (62 mph).

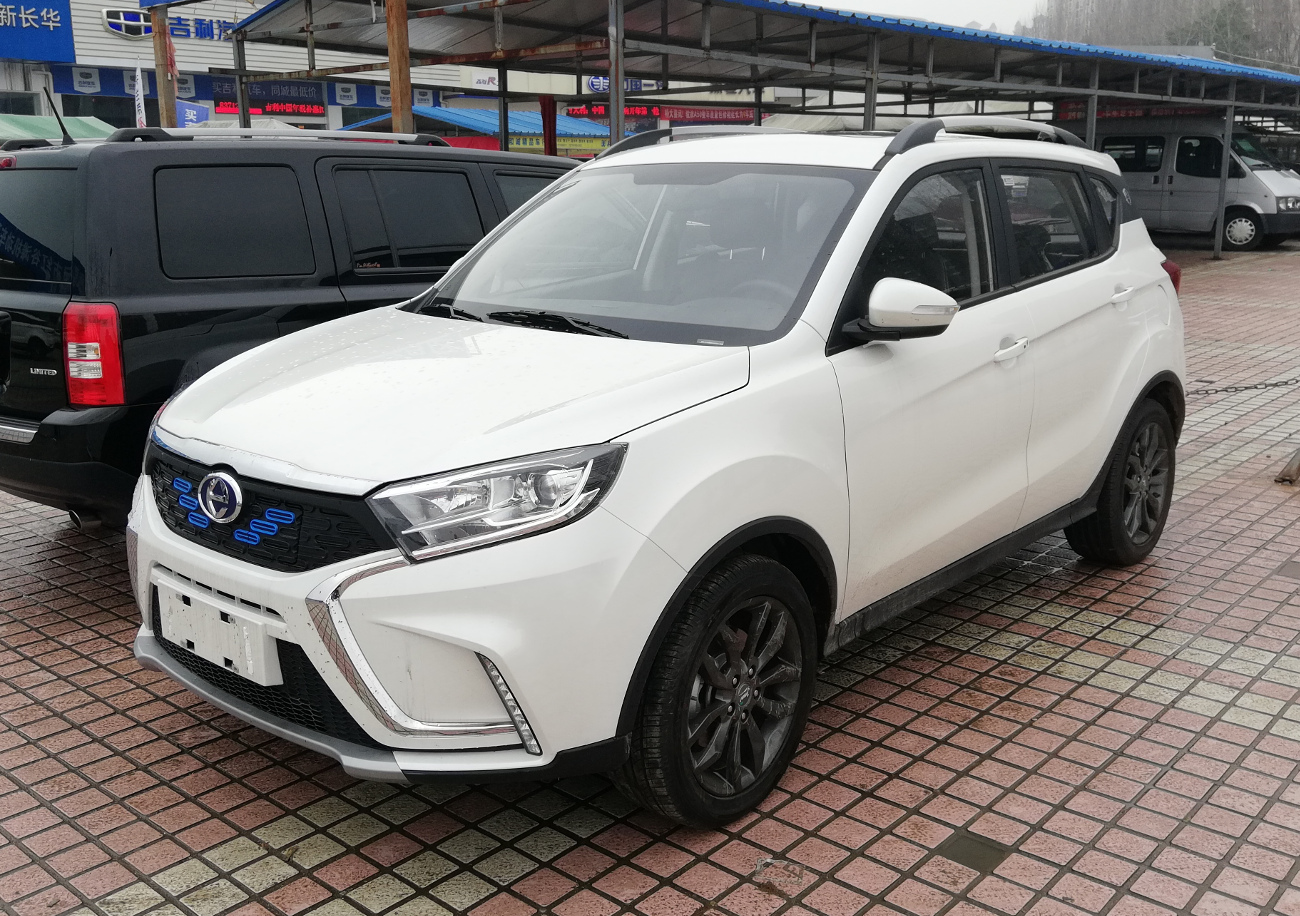
JMEV E400 front

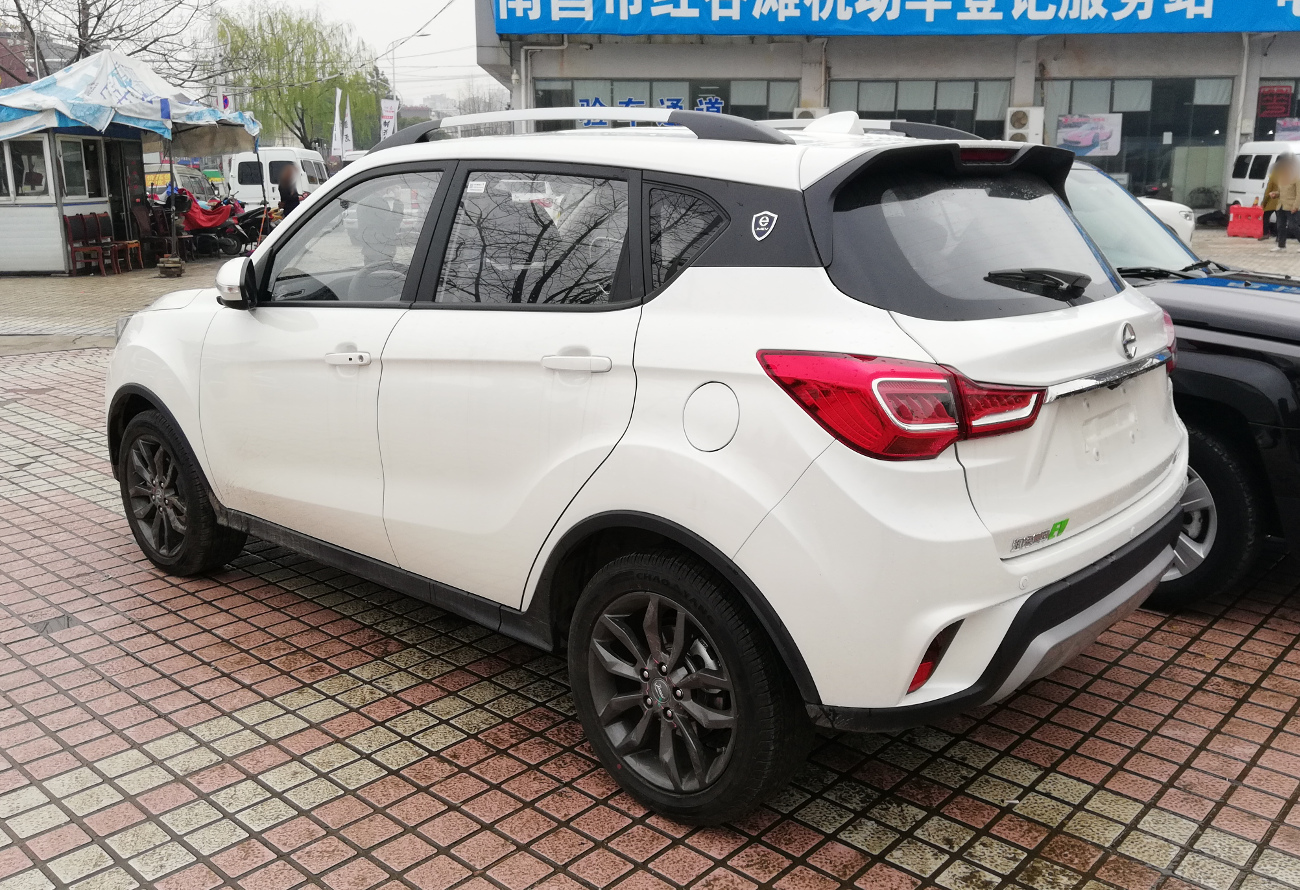
JMEV E400 rear
