= VinFast VF MPV 7 =

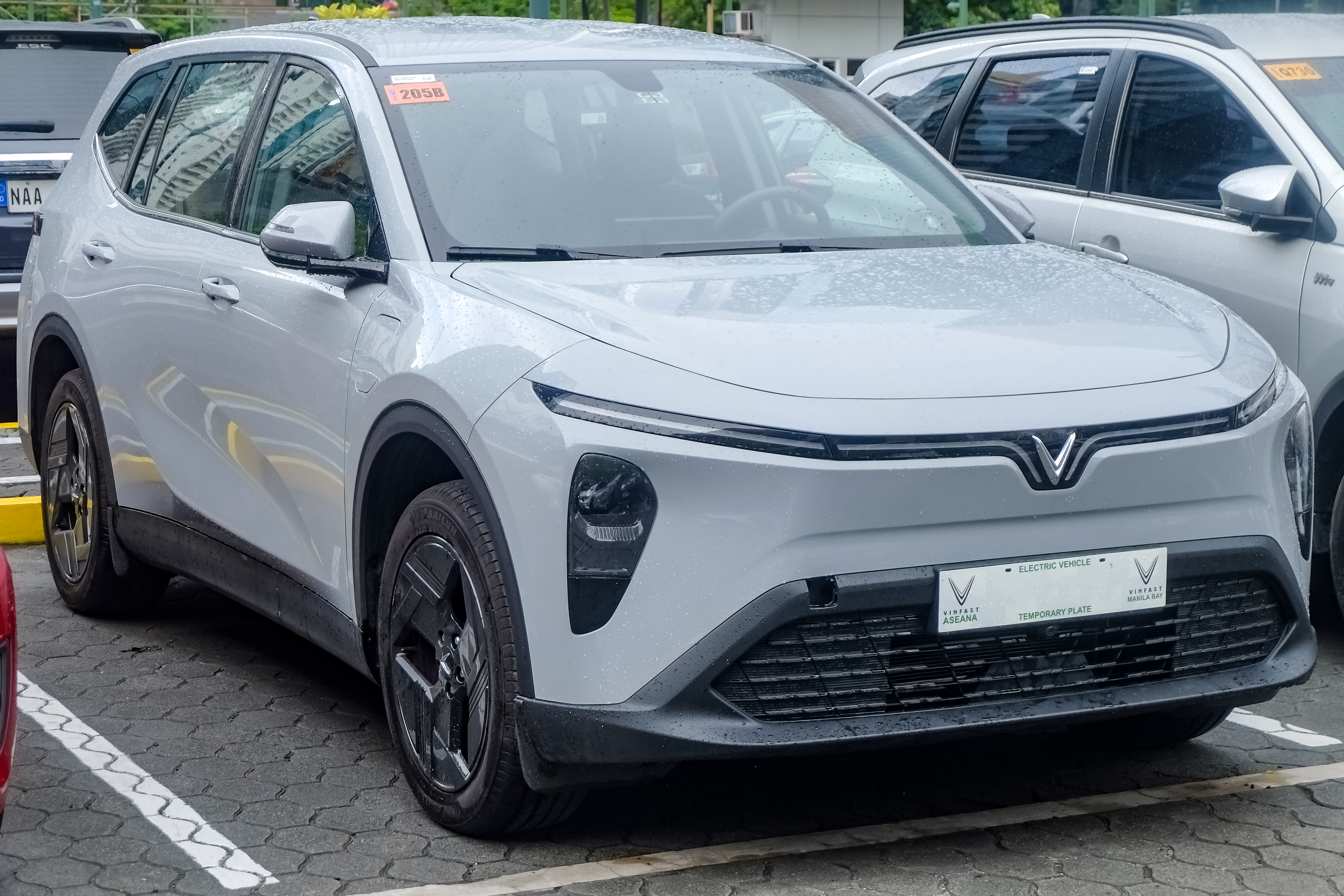
- VinFast VF MPV 7 (Philippines)

Overview
- Manufacturer: VinFast
- Also called: VinFast Limo Green (taxi/ride-hailing variant)
- Production: August 2025 – present
- Assembly: Vietnam: Cát Hải, Haiphong; Indonesia: Subang, West Java (VinFast Indonesia); India: Thoothukudi, Tamil Nadu (VinFast India)

Body and chassis
- Class: Mid-size MPV
- Body style: 5-door MPV
- Layout: Front-motor, front-wheel-drive
- Related: LS Auto LEV 01

Powertrain
- Electric motor: Permanent magnet synchronous
- Power output: 150 kW (204 PS; 201 hp)
- Battery: 60.13 kWh LFP
- Electric range: 450 km (280 mi) (NEDC)
- Plug-in charging: 6.6 kW (AC); 80 kW (DC)

Dimensions
- Wheelbase: 2,840 mm (111.8 in)
- Length: 4,740 mm (186.6 in)
- Width: 1,872 mm (73.7 in)
- Height: 1,729 mm (68.1 in)

The VinFast VF MPV 7, also marketed as the VinFast Limo Green for the less-equipped taxi and ride-hailing variant, is a battery electric mid-size MPV manufactured and marketed by Vietnamese carmaker, VinFast of Vingroup from 2025. The model first went on sale in Vietnam in August 2025 as the Limo Green, and went on sale in Indonesia and India in the first half of 2026.

== History ==
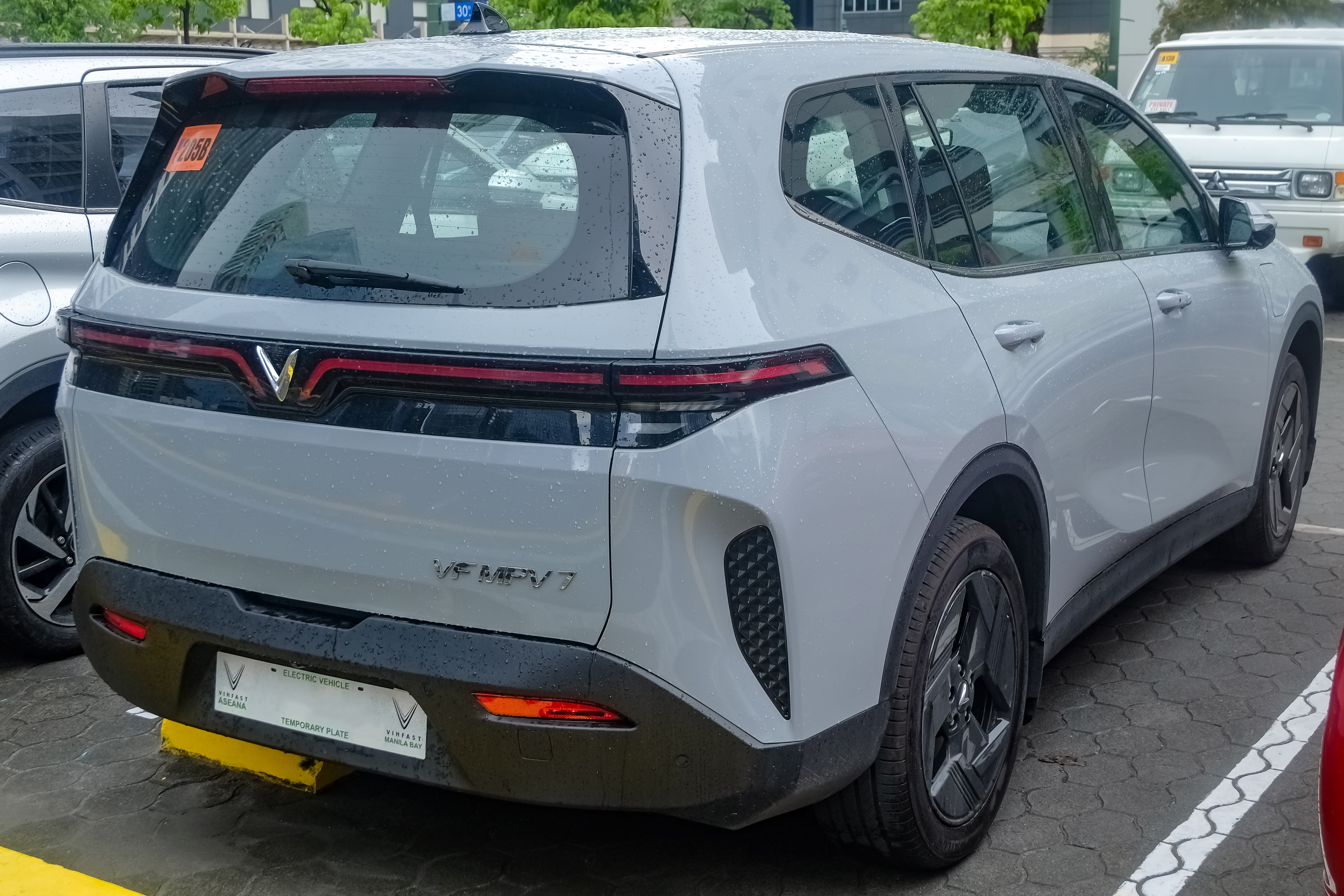
Rear view

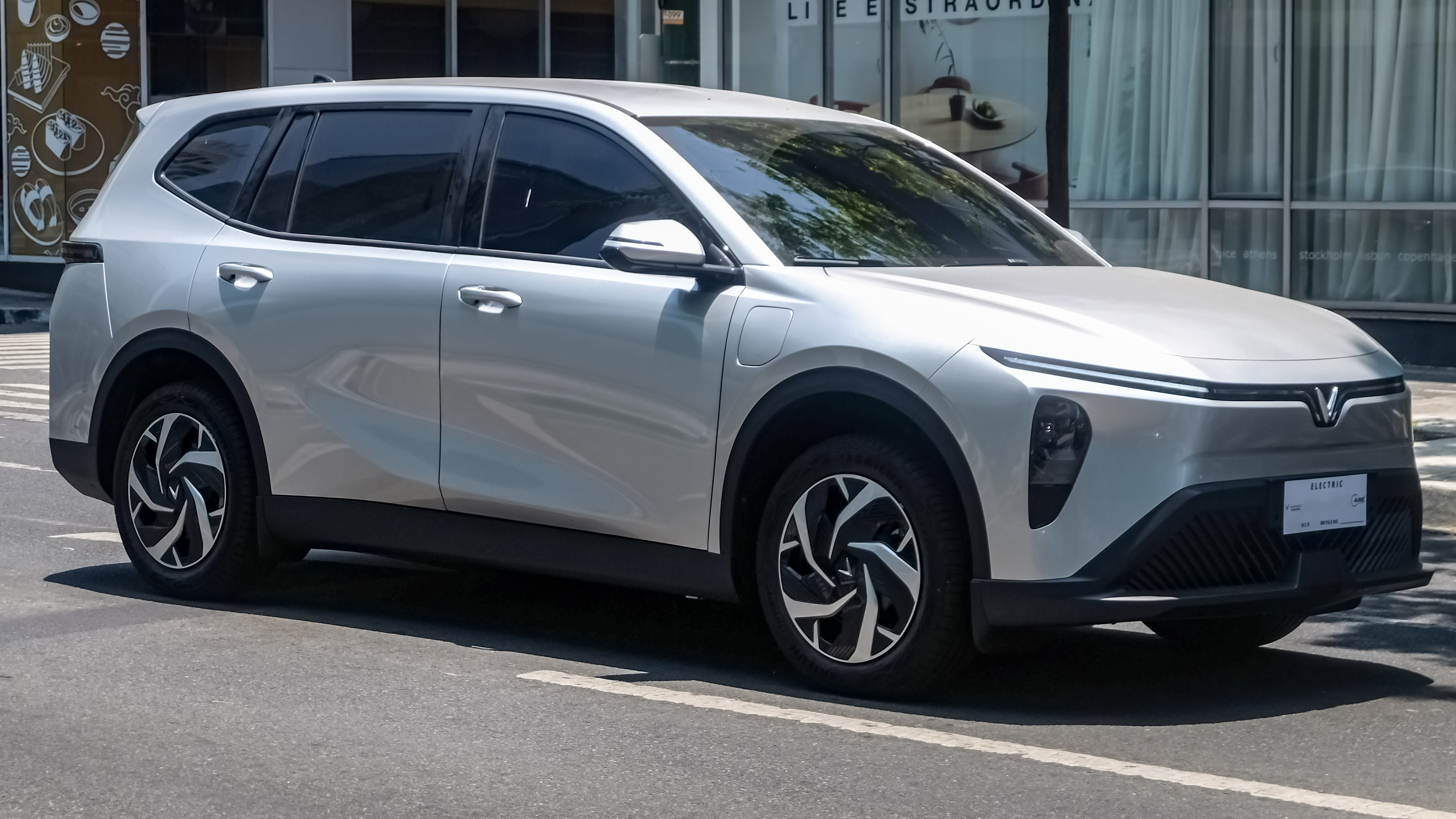
VinFast Limo Green (Philippines)

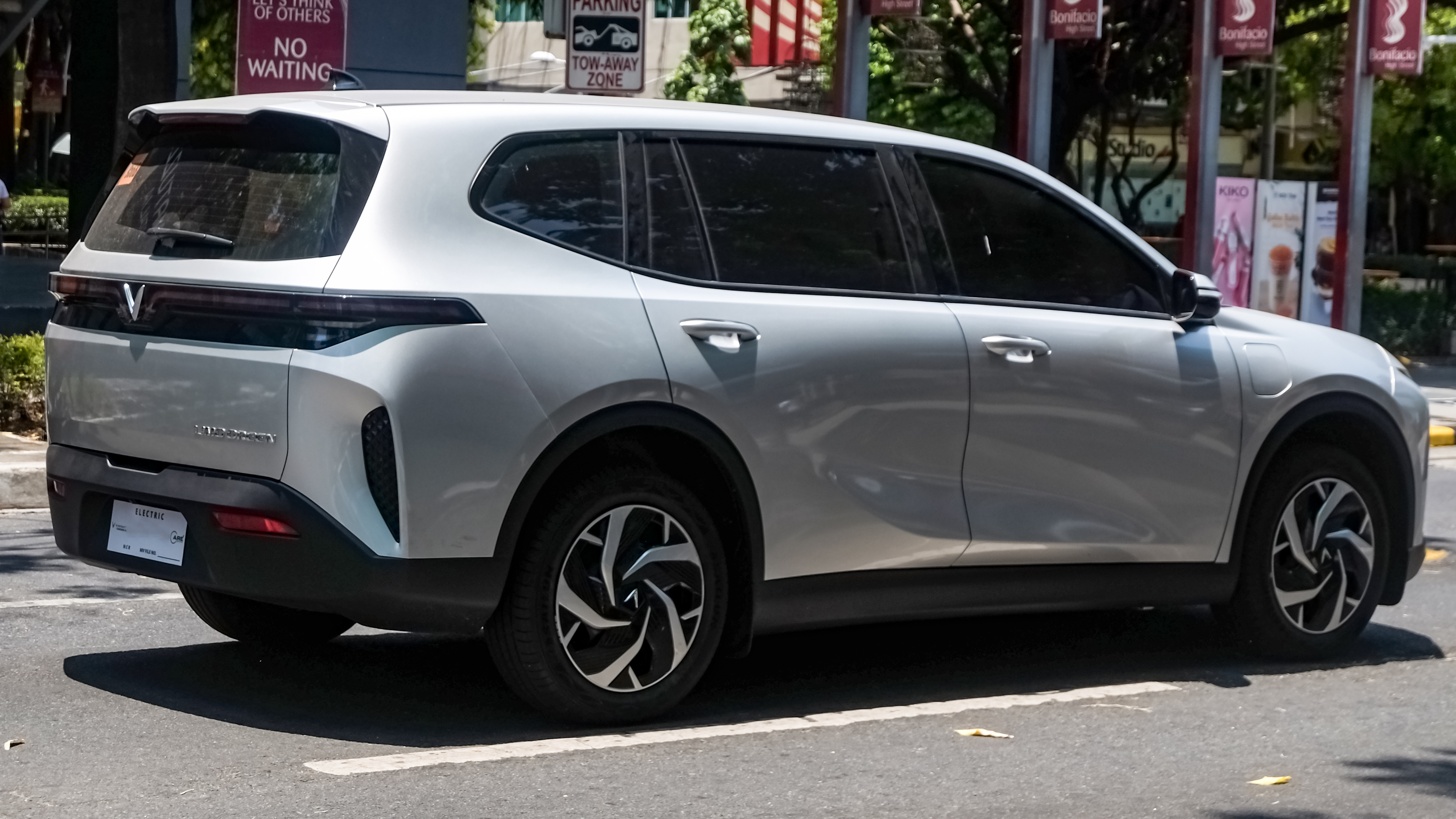
Rear view (Limo Green)

The Limo Green was revealed by VinFast through a set of images on 9 January 2025, alongside three other "Green" models, which are the Minio Green, Nerio Green (based on the VinFast VF e34), and the Herio Green (based on the VinFast VF 5). These "Green" series are positioned as commercial, ride-sharing and taxi-oriented vehicles. Previously, the Limo Green nameplate was used by the Green SM taxi version of the VF e34 in Indonesia, before it was renamed to Nerio Green.

The Limo Green went on sale in Vietnam in August 2025 in a single specification.

As it is the case with the VinFast VF 5 and VF e34, development of the VF MPV 7 / Limo Green was largely outsourced to Chinese-based original design manufacturer (ODM) Shanghai Longsheng Automotive Design Co., Ltd., which operates internationally as LS Auto. The Limo Green itself is based on LS Auto's in-house model, the LEV 01 battery-electric SUV, with an enlarged rear body to accommodate the third row seat.

In January 2026, VinFast launched a version of the Limo Green oriented for private buyers in the Vietnamese market called VF MPV 7. The VF MPV 7, similar to the Limo Green, is available in a single variant. It includes several distinctions from the Limo Green, such as styling features like LED light bands forming a 'V' signature between the daytime running lights (DRLs), chrome moulding along the beltline, and 19-inch wheels. Inside, the VF MPV 7 maintains the simple, minimalist interior layout of the Limo Green, while the center console has been revised to provide additional storage space, relocating the electronic gear selector to a position behind the steering wheel. The cabin features artificial leather upholstery for an enhanced aesthetic and includes a PM2.5 air filtration system. Other amenities comprise automatic climate control, a 10.1-inch touchscreen infotainment system with wireless Apple CarPlay and Android Auto, remote vehicle tracking, rear parking sensors, and a reverse camera.

The Limo Green made its overseas debut in Indonesia at the Gaikindo Jakarta Auto Week in November 2025. The VF MPV 7 variant debuted in February 2026 at the Indonesia International Motor Show.

The VF MPV 7 was launched in India on 15 April 2026 at ₹24.49 lakh (ex-showroom), while its fleet-oriented counterpart, the Limo Green, was launched on 5 June 2026 for ride-hailing and commercial operators.
