= JMEV EV3 =

Battery electric city car

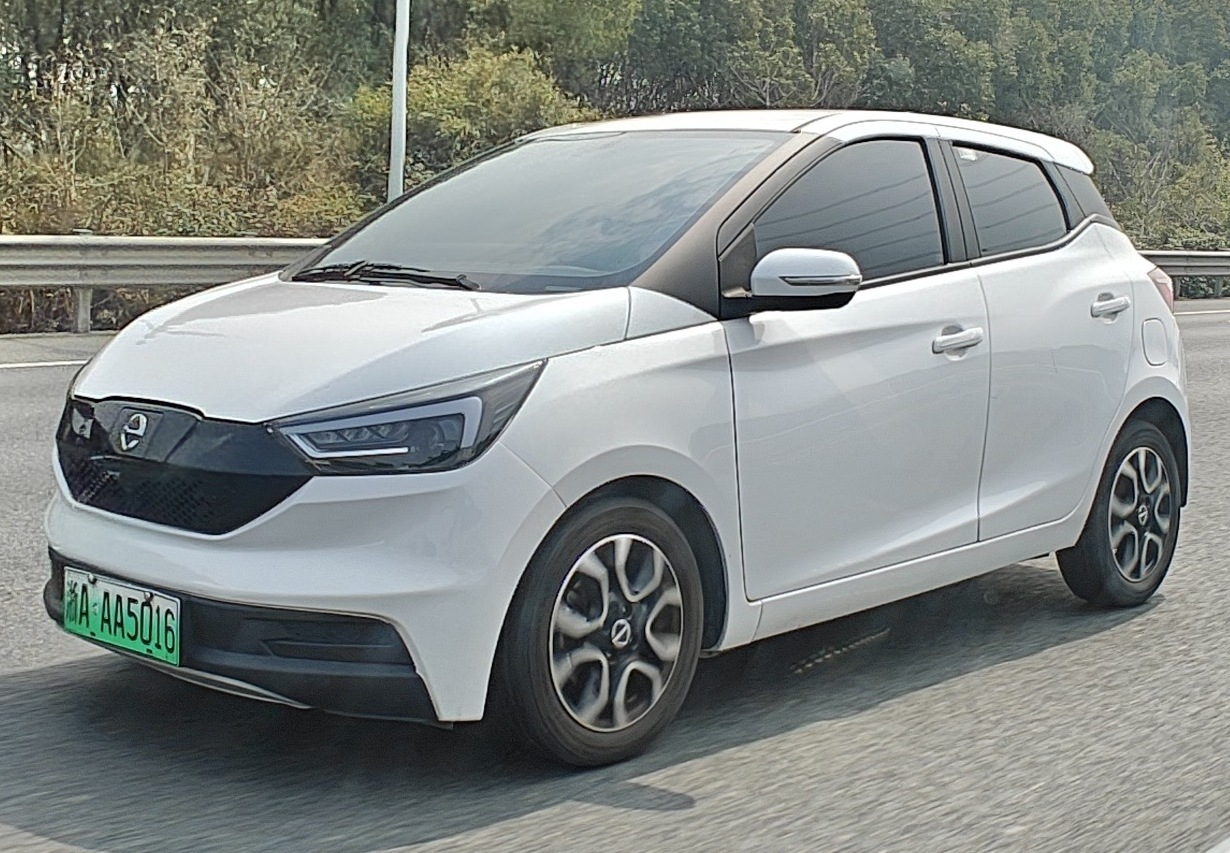

Overview
- Manufacturer: JMEV
- Also called: JMEV Easy 3; JMEV E300; EVeasy EV3; JMEV EV3 Plus; Avantier Commuter; Emova Urban
- Production: March 2019 – present
- Assembly: China: Nanchang (JMEV)

Body and chassis
- Class: City car (A)
- Body style: 5-door hatchback
- Layout: Front motor, front-wheel drive
- Platform: AMEV
- Related: JMEV Xiaoqilin

Powertrain
- Electric motor: 35 kW, 36 kW, 40 kW; TZ180XS250 50 kW (Plus)
- Battery: 31.9 kWh NMC; 31.15 kWh NMC (Youth); 21.4 kWh Na-ion (Youth); 30.24 kWh LFP (Plus)
- Electric range: NEDC: 302 km (188 mi); CLTC: 320 km (200 mi) (Youth); 251 km (156 mi) (Na-ion); 330 km (210 mi) (Plus)

Dimensions
- Wheelbase: 2,390 mm (94 in)
- Length: 3,720 mm (146 in)
- Width: 1,640 mm (65 in)
- Height: 1,485–1,535 mm (58.5–60.4 in)
- Curb weight: 1,020–1,125 kg (2,249–2,480 lb)

The JMEV EV3 is a battery electric city car produced by JMEV. It was initially called the E300 before it was renamed to the EVeasy EV3 before sales began in March 2019. It is the first vehicle fully developed by JMEV. Starting in 2024, it was offered with an optional sodium-ion battery pack supplied by Farasis Energy, making it one of the first production vehicles to feature the battery chemistry.

== Overview ==
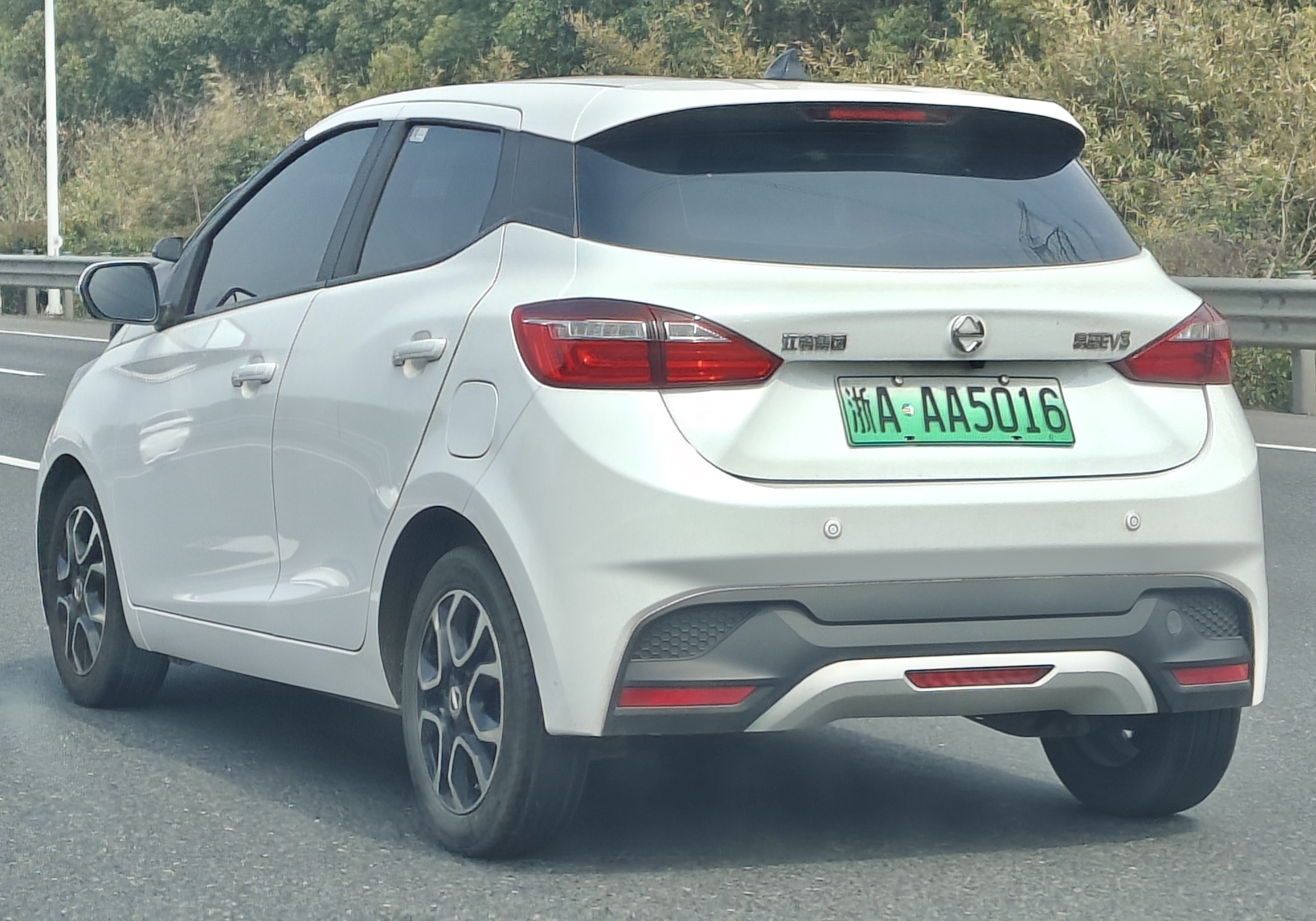
Rear view

The EV3 is a four-door, four-passenger sub-compact hatchback city car developed by JMEV. It was originally revealed as the E300 at the Auto Guangzhou 2018, before it went on sale in March 2019 as the EV3 after being moved to under the EVeasy sub-brand.

It has a wheel track of 1,420 mm (55.9 in) with optional 15-inch wheels using 175/60 R15 tires, and a 51:49 weight distribution. It has a height of 1,485 mm (58.5 in), or 1,494 mm (58.8 in) with optional roof racks. It uses a McPherson strut front suspension and a non-independent torsion beam rear suspension. With the rear seats folded down, it has a trunk space of 1,000 litres (35 cu ft).

The DC fast charging port is located behind a door containing the front badge, while the AC charging port is located behind the left rear door. It has halogen headlights, LED daytime running lights, and optional fog lights. Color options include Lotus White, Blue, Acacia Grey, and Cinnabar Red with an available two-tone contrasting roof on some models.

The dashboard features a standard reflector-style heads-up display, an optional multifunction steering wheel, and a centrally-positioned segmented LCD instrument cluster display behind a floating 8-inch infotainment display. The vehicle has several optional safety features, including a surround-view camera system, front and rear parking sensors, blind-spot detection, low speed auto-emergency braking, tire pressure monitoring, and two front airbags. Additionally, the EV3 supports a digital phone key feature, allowing a smartphone to lock and unlock the doors, start the vehicle, view the vehicle's status, and set the HVAC system temperature. The central console contains the gear shift lever, along with Eco and Sport mode buttons.

It is powered by a choice of two electric motors, with outputs of 35 kW (47 hp; 48 PS) and 150 N⋅m (111 lb⋅ft) of torque or 50 kW (67 hp; 68 PS) and 180 N⋅m (133 lb⋅ft) or torque, with power supplied by a 31.9 kWh NMC battery pack allowing for an NEDC range rating of 302 kilometres (188 mi). The vehicle has a top speed of 102 km/h (63 mph).

In 2021, the EV3 was slightly updated with an increased roof height of 1,535 mm (60.4 in), and many of the previously optional safety features became standard.

=== 2023 Youth Edition ===
In October 2023, JMEV revealed an updated model called the Youth Edition, which was sold alongside previous models as a different trim level. It features minor styling changes to the front grille with a new diamond pattern with illuminating elements, and an array of new exterior colors, including Moonlight White, Tourmaline Green, Mint Green, and the two-tone Powder Pink, which comes with a white-painted floating roof. Additionally, exterior elements such as the door handles and mirror caps are painted in a contrasting color. The interior also features new colorways, with a grey interior with the option of Chery Blossom Pink or Sea Blue accents. The interior features an accented steering wheel with control buttons, and a 10.1-inch central infotainment screen that also serves as the instrument cluster; it no longer features a heads-up display. Using a paired phone's data connection, the infotainment system can run services such as navigation, QQ Music, and Ximalaya, or use screen-mirroring of an Android device. It also has available features such as 360-degree surround-view cameras and tire pressure monitoring.

It has a 31.15 kWh NMC battery pack with a CLTC range rating of 320 kilometres (199 mi). It has a motor capable of 36 kW (48 hp; 49 PS) and 140 N⋅m (103 lb⋅ft) of torque.

In 2024, the vehicle was updated with a motor outputting 40 kW (54 hp; 54 PS) and 110 N⋅m (81 lb⋅ft) of torque, increasing the CLTC range rating to 330 kilometres (205 mi).

==== Sodium-ion battery ====
On December 28, 2023 the first EV3 equipped with a sodium-ion battery was completed on the production line, and the new variant went on sale in 2024 slotting under the lithium-ion battery model in pricing. The battery pack is made by Farasis Energy for JMEV, and has a capacity of 21.4 kWh allowing for a CLTC range rating of 251 kilometres (156 mi). The pack lacks a cold weather heating system, as the improved cold temperature performance inherent to the sodium chemistry allows for over 91% of charge capacity to be retained at −20 °C (−4 °F). The battery uses a hard carbon anode, and a layered oxide cathode and has an energy density of 140-160 Wh/kg according to Farasis. This version of the vehicle weighs 1,125 kilograms (2,480 lb), and has an optional lower rated motor capable of 35 kW (47 hp; 48 PS) and 110 N⋅m (81 lb⋅ft) or torque in addition to the previously available 36 kW motor.

=== 2025 Plus refresh ===
For 2025, the vehicle was refreshed with lightly updated exterior styling and a new powertrain, replacing all previous models with two trim levels. It adopts the exterior and interior updates seen in the Youth Edition, with minor updates such as a new aerodynamic wheel design. It is powered by a TZ180XS250 electric motor making 50 kW (67 hp; 68 PS) and 125 N⋅m (92 lb⋅ft) of torque. Power is supplied by a Gotion built 30.24 kWh air-cooled LFP battery pack capable of DC charging from 30-80% in 32 minutes, achieving a CLTC range rating of 330 kilometres (205 mi). The vehicle weighs 1,060 kilograms (2,337 lb), and top speed remains at 102 km/h (63 mph).

Powertrains
Year	Battery		Power	Torque	CLTC range	Top speed
Year	Type	Supplier	Power	Torque	CLTC range	Top speed
2019–2023	31.9 kWh NMC	—	35 kW (47 hp; 48 PS)	150 N⋅m (110 lb⋅ft)	302 km (188 mi) (NEDC)	102 km/h (63 mph)
2019–2023	31.9 kWh NMC	—	50 kW (67 hp; 68 PS)	180 N⋅m (130 lb⋅ft)	302 km (188 mi) (NEDC)	102 km/h (63 mph)
2024	21.4 kWh Na-ion	Farasis	35 kW (47 hp; 48 PS)	110 N⋅m (81 lb⋅ft)	251 km (156 mi)	102 km/h (63 mph)
2024	21.4 kWh Na-ion	Farasis	36 kW (48 hp; 49 PS)	140 N⋅m (100 lb⋅ft)	251 km (156 mi)	102 km/h (63 mph)
2023–2024	31.15 kWh NMC	Farasis	36 kW (48 hp; 49 PS)	140 N⋅m (100 lb⋅ft)	320 km (200 mi)	102 km/h (63 mph)
2024	31.15 kWh NMC	Farasis	40 kW (54 hp; 54 PS)	110 N⋅m (81 lb⋅ft)	330 km (210 mi)	102 km/h (63 mph)
2025–	30.24 kWh LFP	Gotion	50 kW (67 hp; 68 PS)	125 N⋅m (92 lb⋅ft)	330 km (210 mi)	102 km/h (63 mph)
