= Changan CS35 Plus =

Chinese subcompact crossover SUV

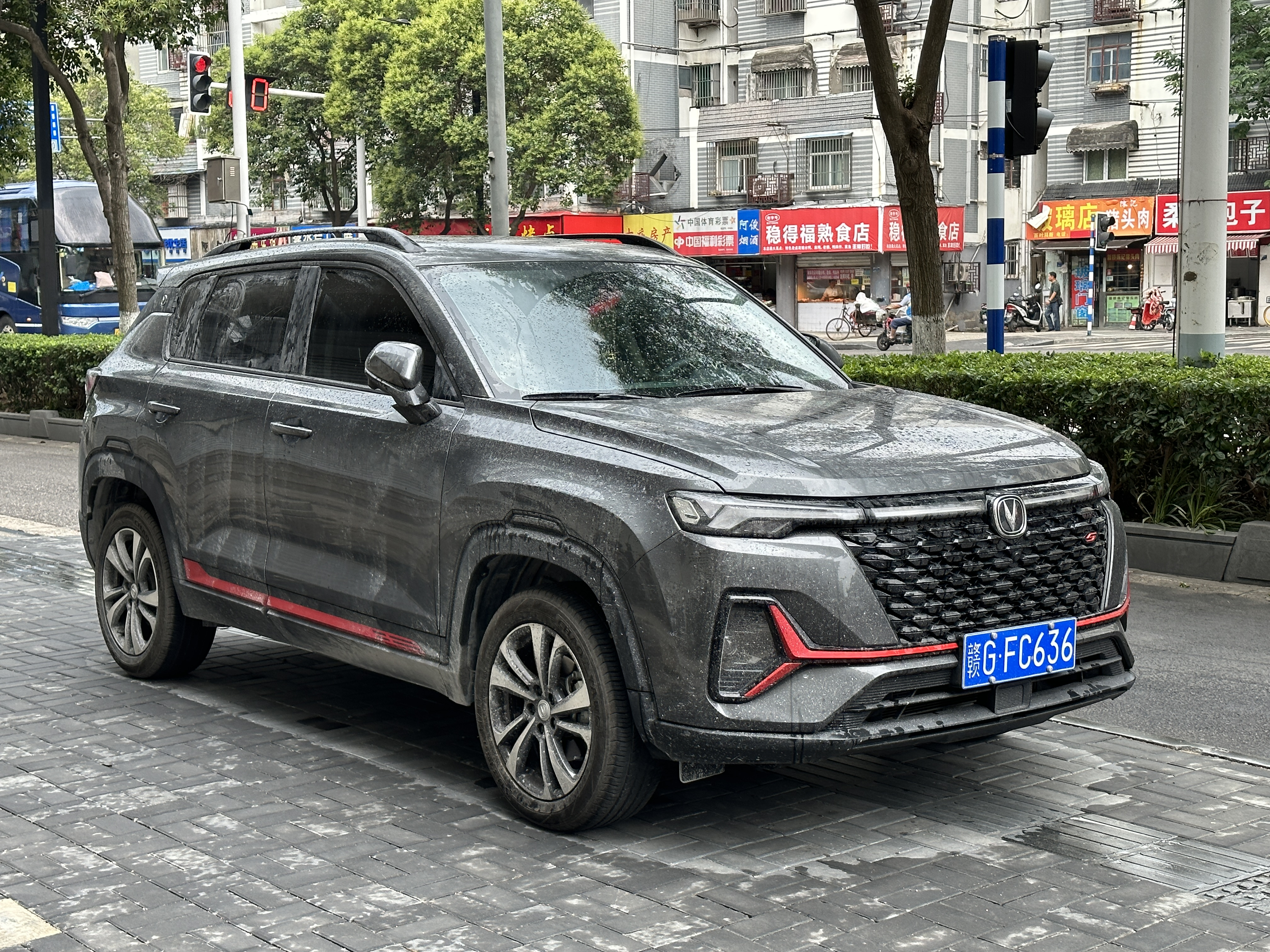
- Changan CS35 Plus (facelift)

Overview
- Manufacturer: Changan Automobile
- Also called: Saipa 421P (Iran); DR 5 (Belgium); DR Stilnovo 5 (Italy)
- Production: 2018–present
- Assembly: China: Chongqing; Belarus: Apchak; Iran: Tehran (Pars Khodro)

Body and chassis
- Class: Subcompact crossover SUV
- Body style: 5-door SUV
- Layout: Front-engine, front-wheel-drive
- Platform: Changan PF-C

Powertrain
- Engine: 1.4 L I4 (Turbocharged petrol); 1.6 L JL478QEP I4 (petrol)
- Transmission: 5-speed manual; 6-speed semi-automatic; 7-speed DCT

Dimensions
- Wheelbase: 2,600 mm (102.4 in)
- Length: 4,335 mm (170.7 in)
- Width: 1,825 mm (71.9 in)
- Height: 1,660 mm (65.4 in)

Chronology
- Predecessor: Changan CS35

The Changan CS35 Plus is a subcompact crossover SUV produced by Changan Automobile positioned slightly above the Changan CS35 as a slightly more premium model.

== Overview ==
The Changan CS35 Plus debuted on the 2018 Chengdu Auto Show with prices ranging from 69,900 yuan to 104,900 yuan and the official market launch in October 2018.

The CS35 Plus was originally planned to be the replacement of the CS35 during development phase, however the plan was changed and the previously launched CS35 was now positioned slightly lower in the market but remained to be in production. The lone engine option of the CS35 Plus at launch is a 1.6-liter engine producing 117 horsepower.

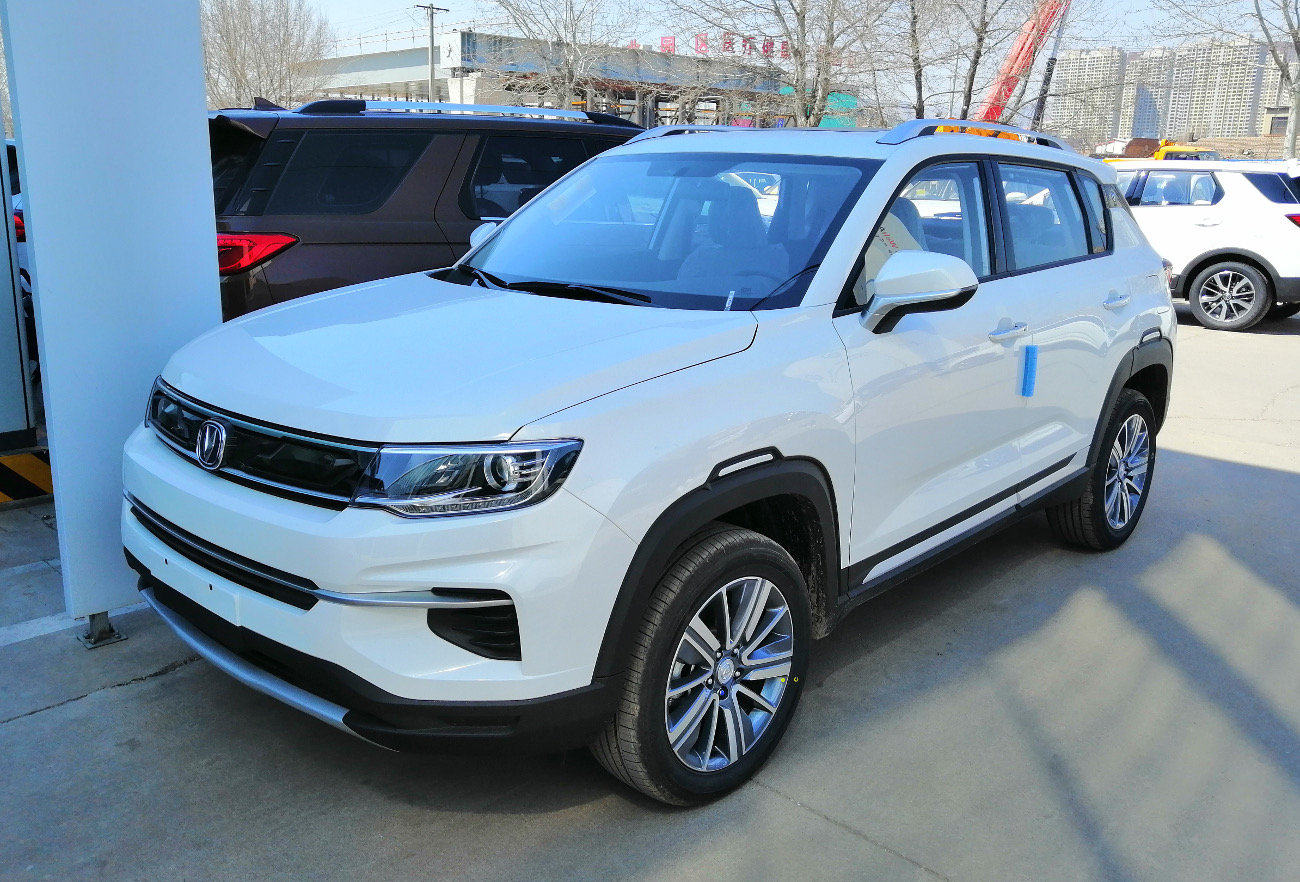
Changan CS35 Plus

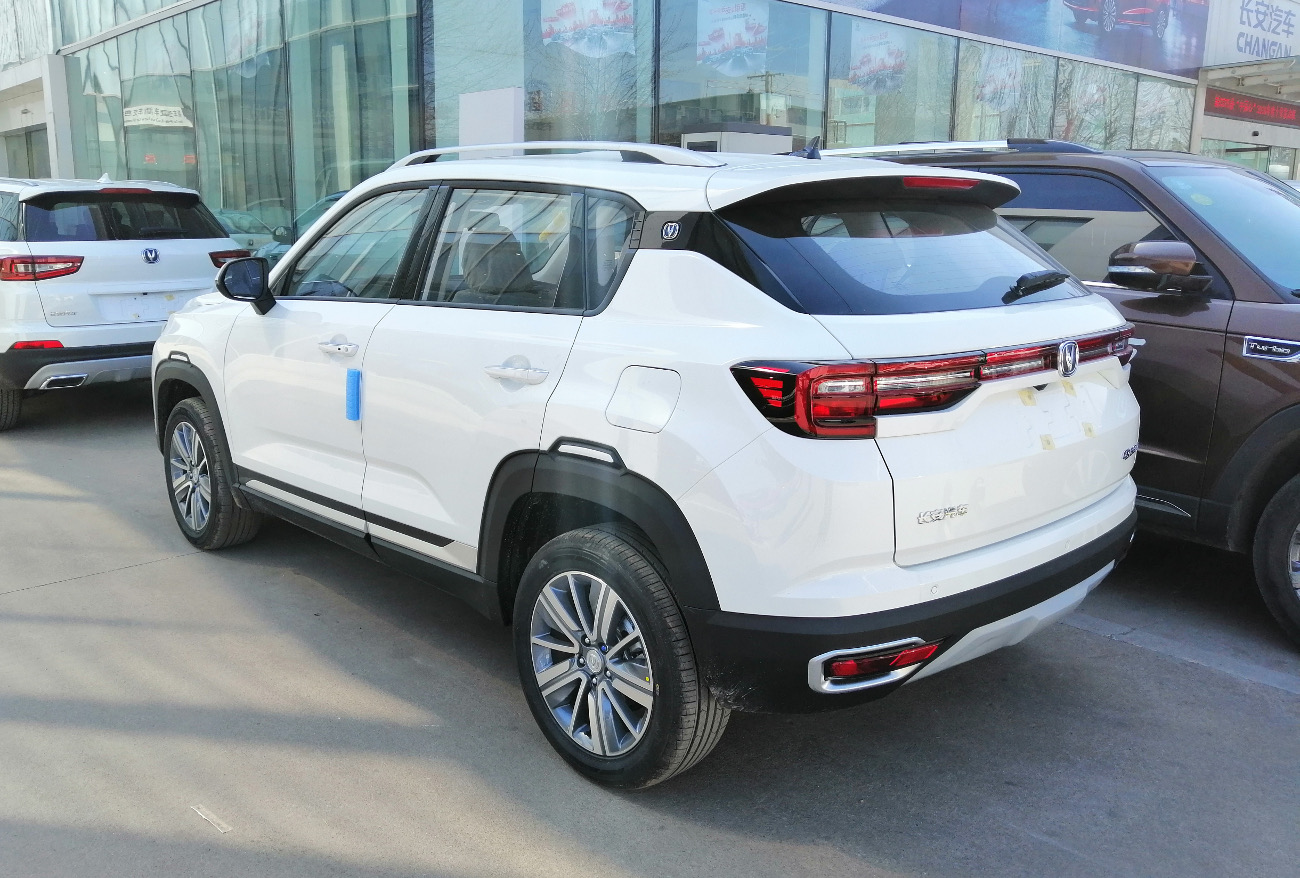
Changan CS35 Plus rear

=== 2021 facelift ===
A facelift of the CS35 Plus was launched in January 2021, featuring redesigned front down road graphics and rear end styling to be more inline with the latest Changan vehicles.

The updated model is powered by a 1.6-liter natural aspirated engine codenamed "JL478QEP" producing 128 hp (130 PS; 95 kW). Transmission options includes a 5-speed manual gearbox, CVT (simulating 8 gears) and a 6-speed automatic transmission.

As of March 2021, the official announcement introduced a 1.4-liter turbo engine also available starting from the 2021 model year developing 158 hp (160 PS; 118 kW) and 260 N⋅m (192 lbf⋅ft) mated to a 7-speed wet DCT.

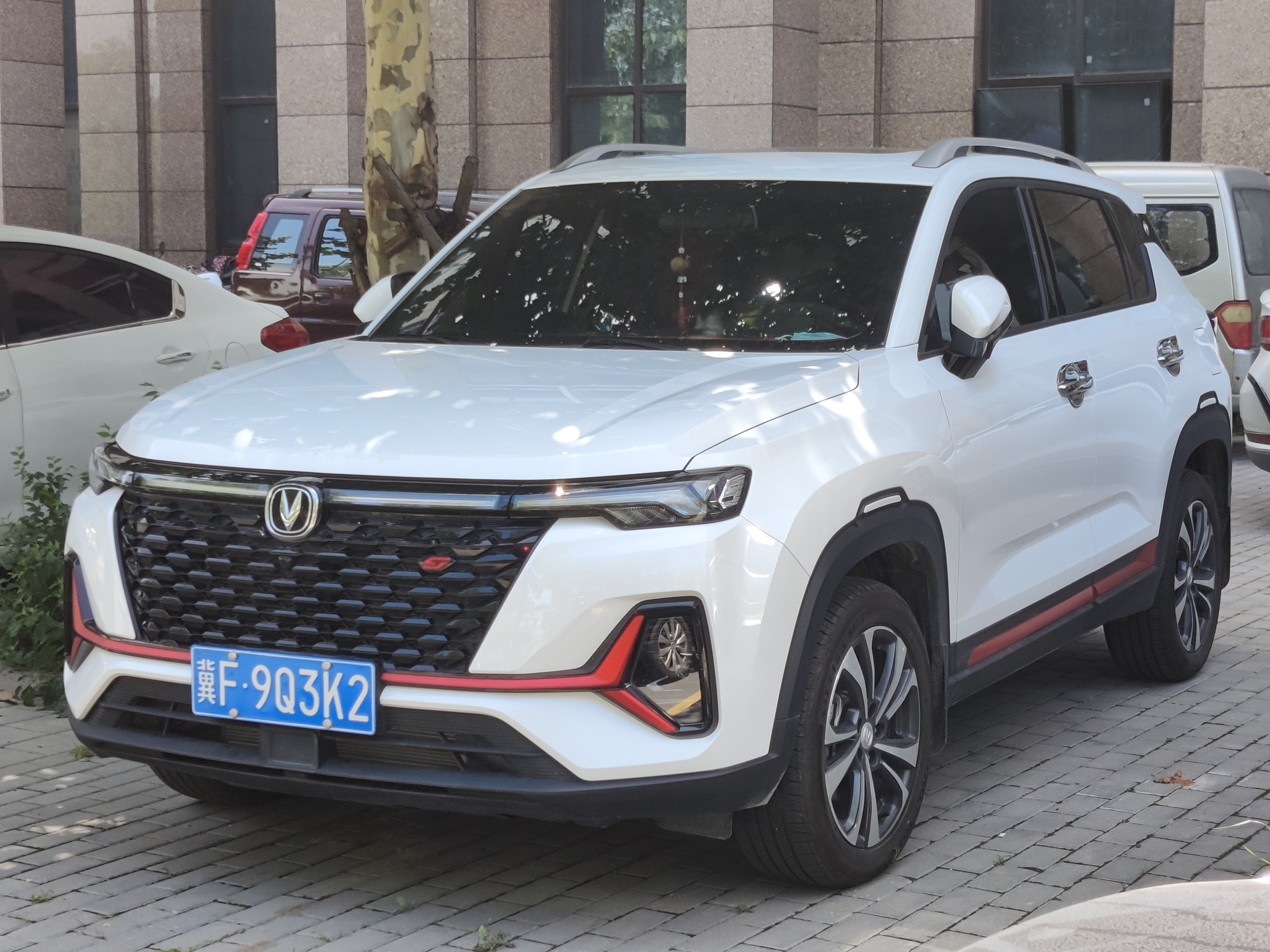
Changan CS35 Plus 2021 (facelift)

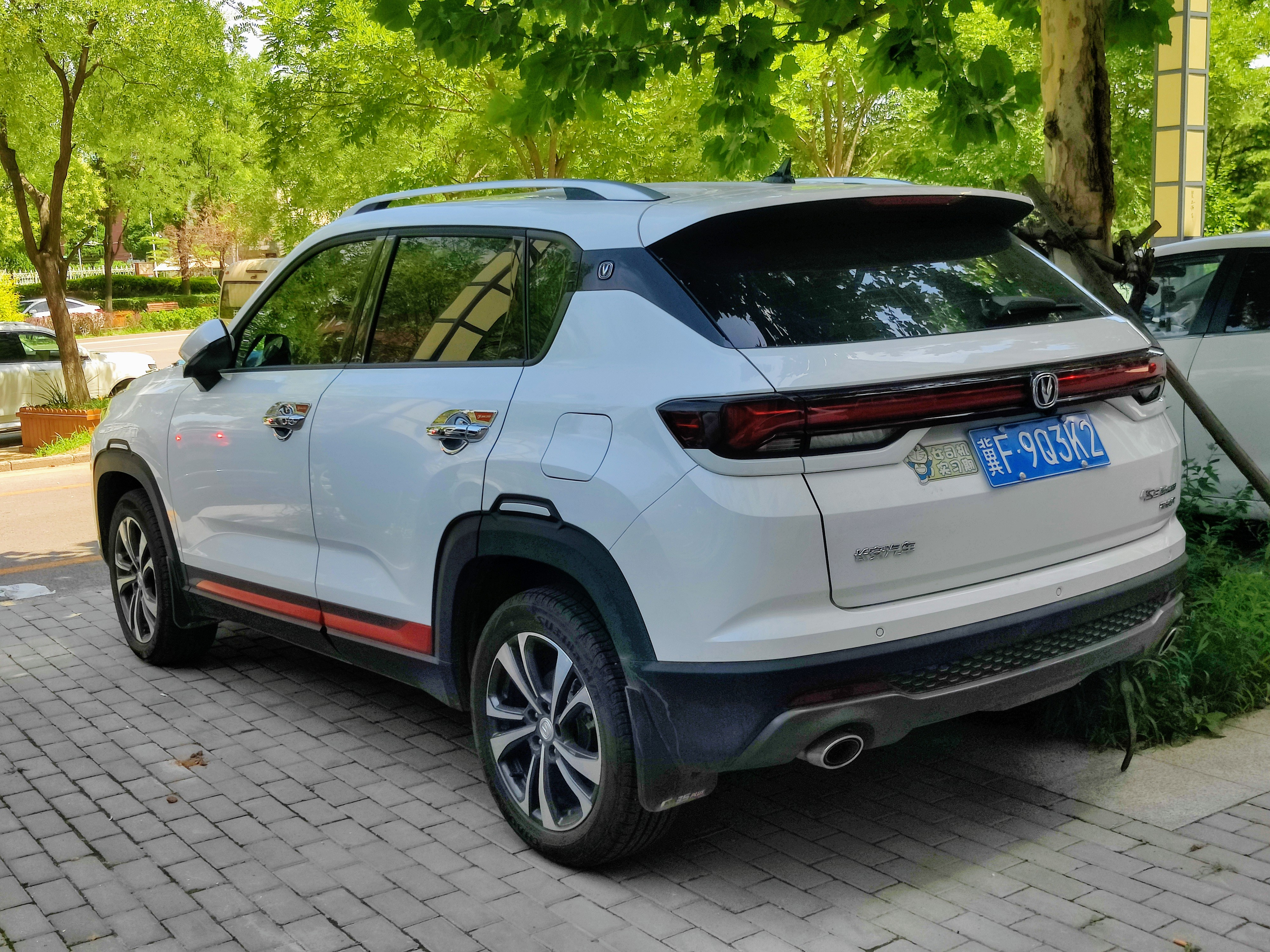
Changan CS35 Plus 2021 (facelift) rear

== Sales ==
Year	China	Mexico	Total production
2021		212	80,152
2022		1,816	76,968
2023	42,905	2,232	71,740
2024	19,741	1,886	66,122
2025	5,499	3,116	30,970
