= Changan CS35 =

Chinese subcompact crossover SUV

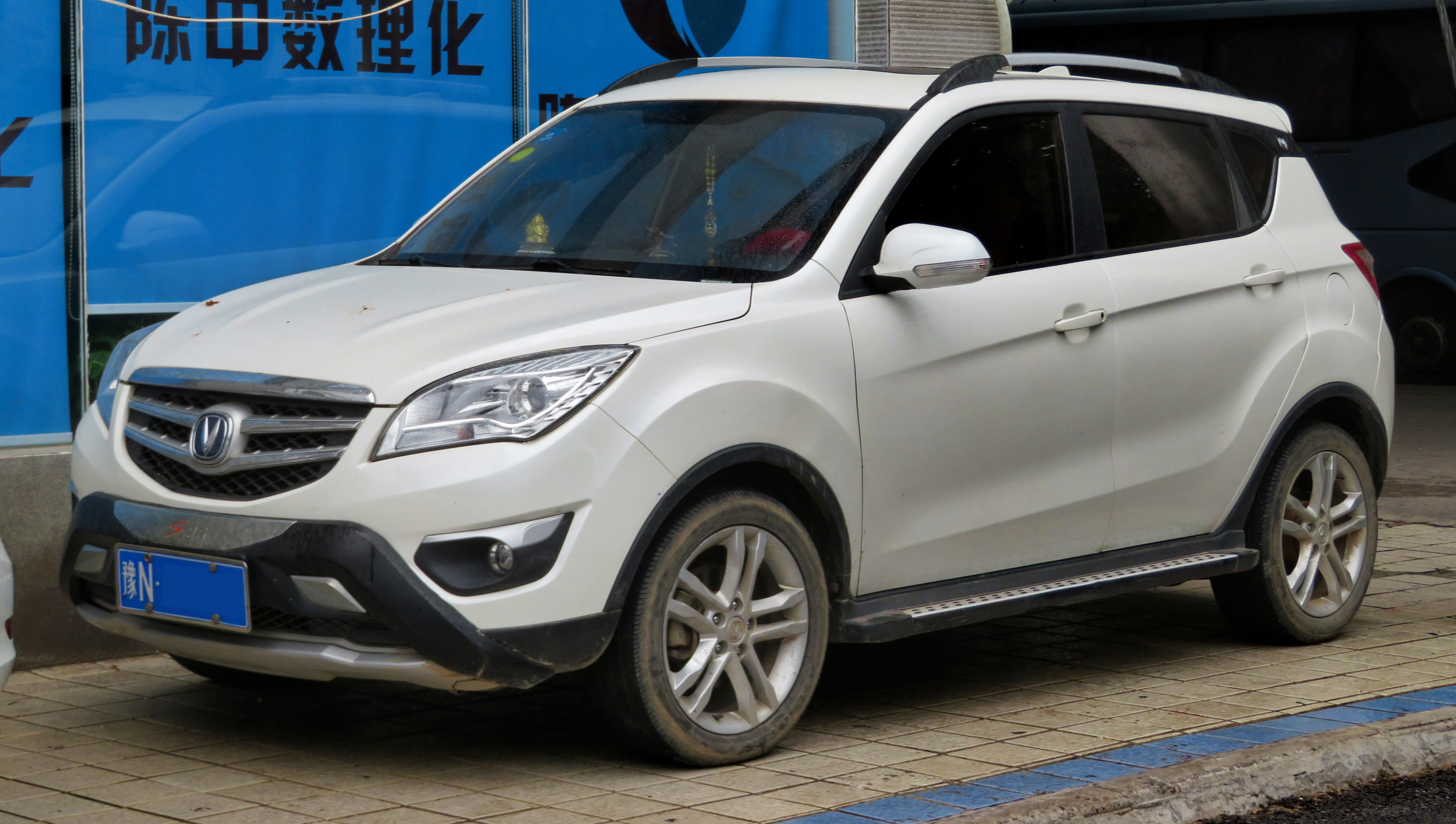

Overview
- Manufacturer: Changan Automobile
- Also called: Oshan COS5°
- Production: 2012–2022
- Model years: 2012–2022
- Assembly: China: Chongqing; Iran: Kashan (SAIPA; 2015–2019)

Body and chassis
- Class: Subcompact crossover SUV (B)
- Body style: 5-door SUV
- Layout: Front-engine, front-wheel-drive
- Related: Landwind X2

Powertrain
- Engine: Petrol: 1.5 L 4G15 I4 turbo; 1.6 L JL478QEE I4
- Transmission: 5-speed manual; 4-speed automatic

Dimensions
- Wheelbase: 2,550 mm (100.4 in)
- Length: 4,200 mm (165.4 in)
- Width: 1,755 mm (69.1 in)
- Height: 1,660 mm (65.4 in)

Chronology
- Successor: Changan CS35 Plus

The Changan CS35 is a subcompact crossover SUV produced by Changan Automobile.

== Overview ==
The Changan CS35 debuted on the 2012 Beijing Auto Show with prices ranging from 68,900 yuan to 86,900 yuan and the official market launch in October 2012.

The CS35 was formerly known as the Chang’an S101 during development phase, however the name was dropped and the CS naming system for new Changan CUV and SUV products was created. The CS35 was designed by the Changan design center in Turin, Italy, and it was Changan's first attempt at making a CUV/ SUV with it also being the smallest CUV of the range before the CS15 was launched.

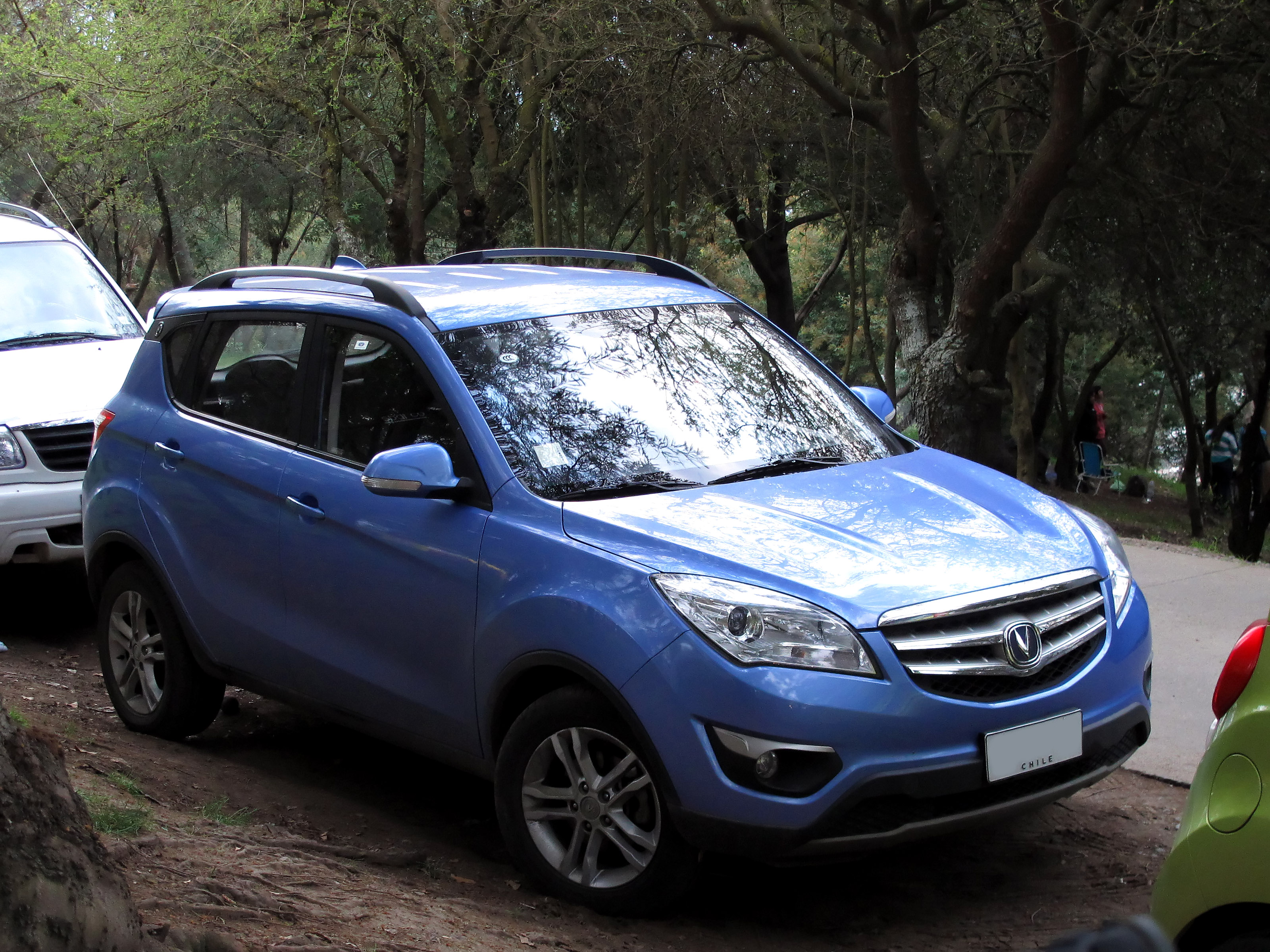
Changan CS35 front in Chile.

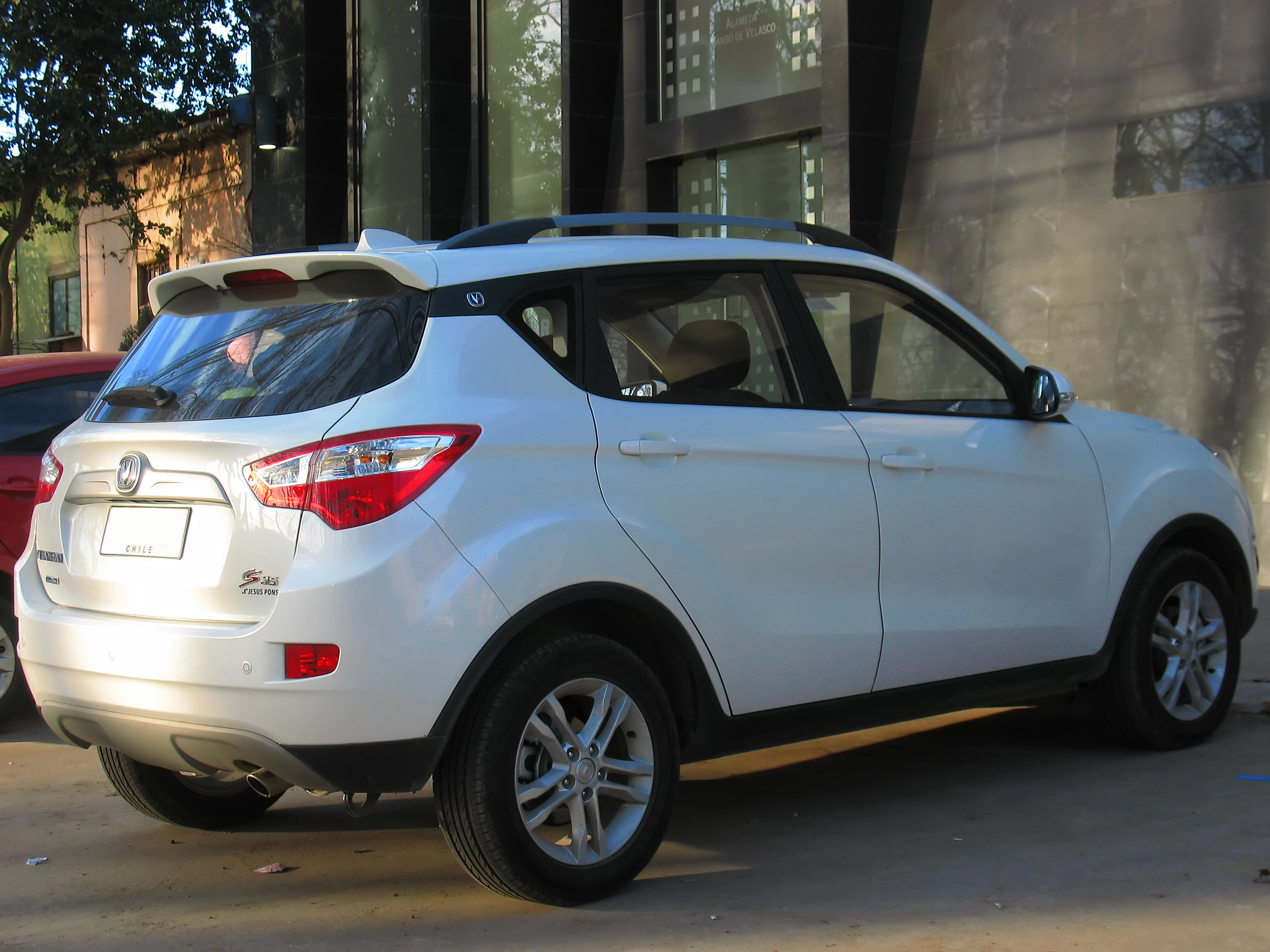
Changan CS35 rear in Chile.

=== 2017 facelift ===
A facelift of the CS35 was launched in 2017 featuring redesigned front and rear lamp inserts. Engine options of the 2017 Changan CS35 is a 1.5 liter turbo engine and a 1.6 liter engine, mated to a 5-speed manual transmission or a 4-speed automatic transmission while producing a maximum engine power of 115.0kW, equivalent to a maximum horsepower of 156PS, and a maximum torque of 210 N · M.

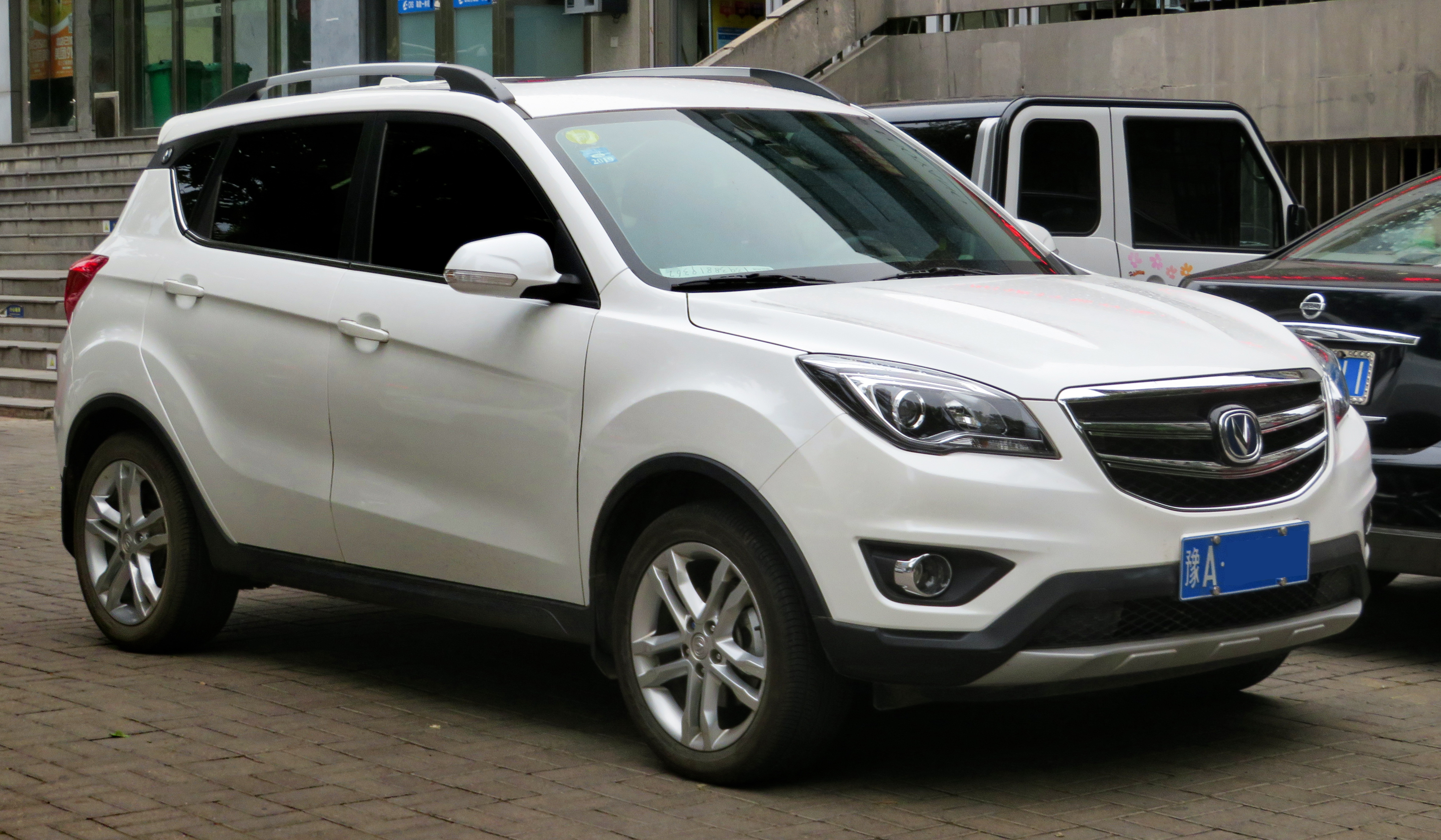
Changan CS35 facelift front

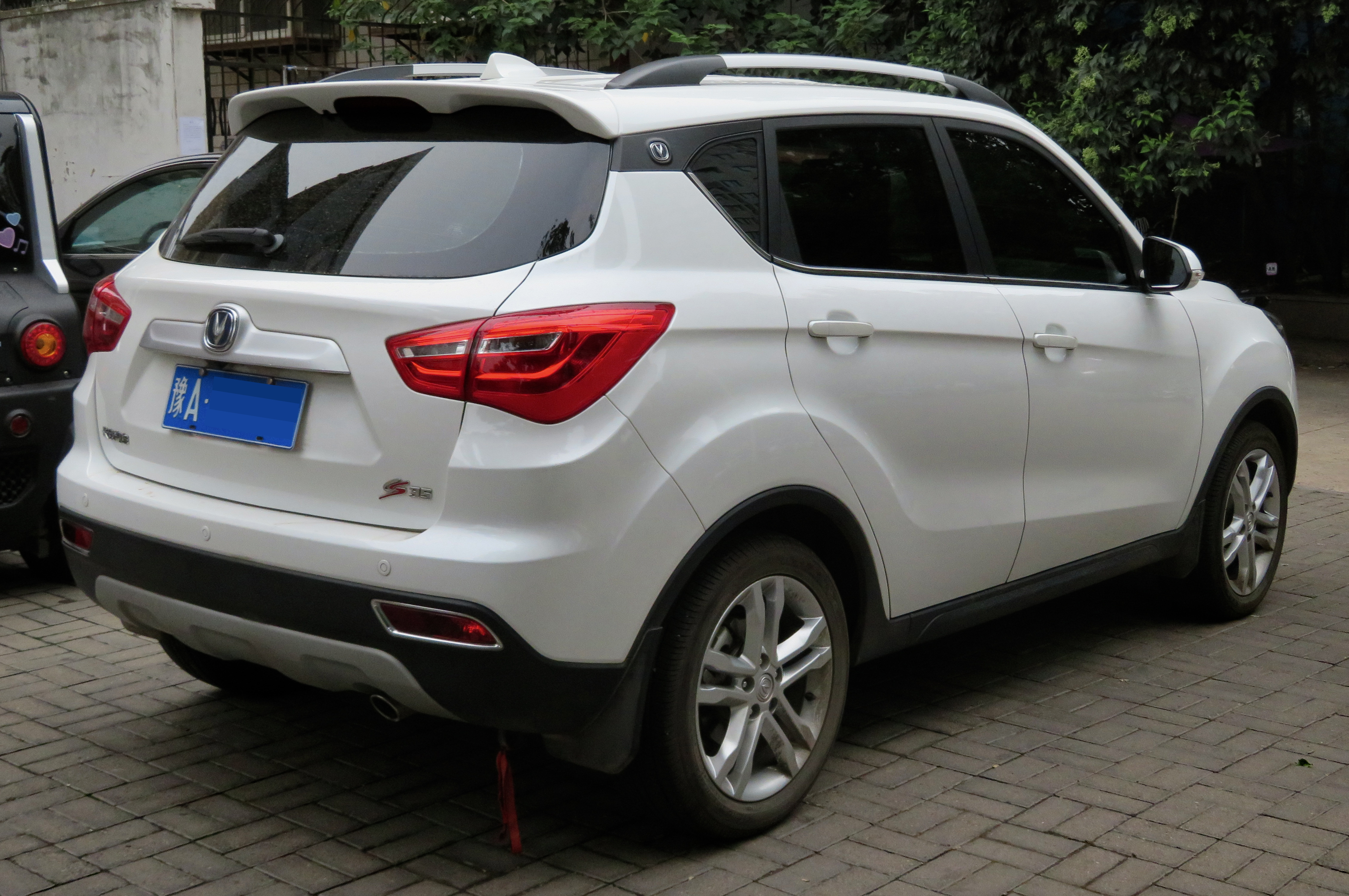
Changan CS35 facelift rear

== Oshan COS5° ==
Launched in 2019, the COS5° (Kesai 5) is a subcompact crossover SUV based on the Changan CS35 and rebadged under the Oshan sub-brand of Changan Automobile. A facelift was conducted in 2020 for the 2021 model year with the 2020 COS5° priced at 53,900 to 65,900yuan (~US$7,766 – US$9,496). The design of the 2020 facelift model has been mainly restyled in the front fascia while the other parts remains mostly the same. In terms of power, the COS5° is powered by a 1.6 liter engine producing a maximum power of 94 kilowatts and a maximum torque of 161 Nm. The engines are matched with 5-speed manual transmissions and CVT transmissions.

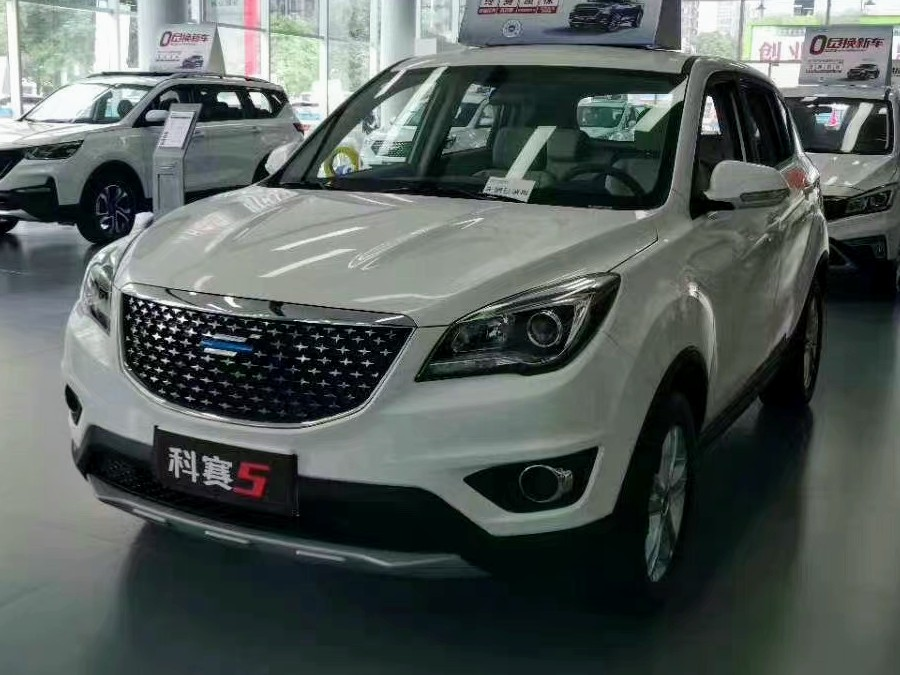
Oshan COS5° front

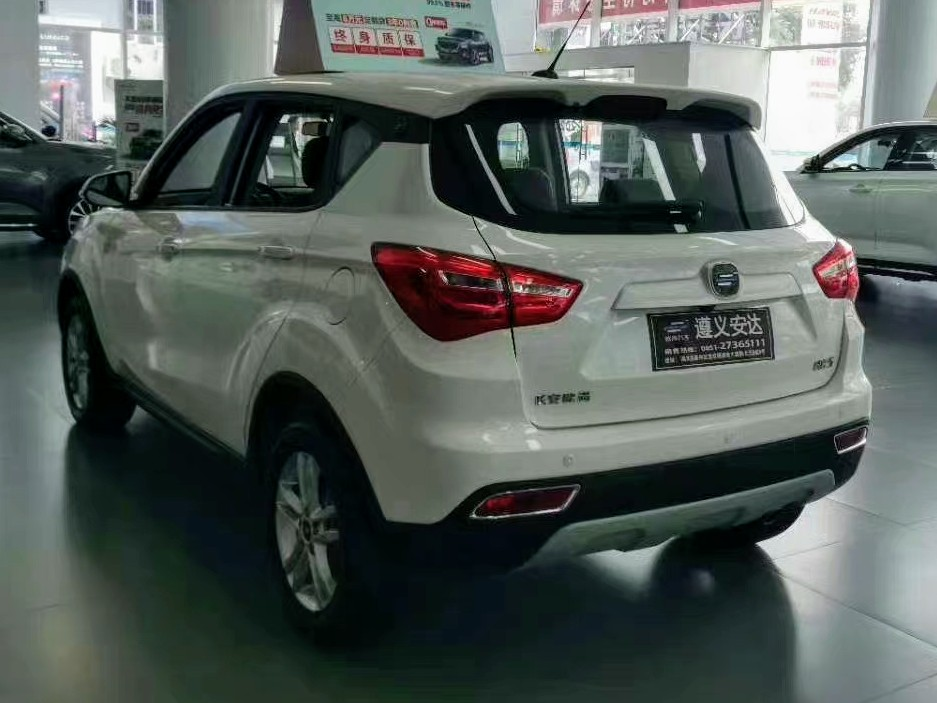
Oshan COS5° rear

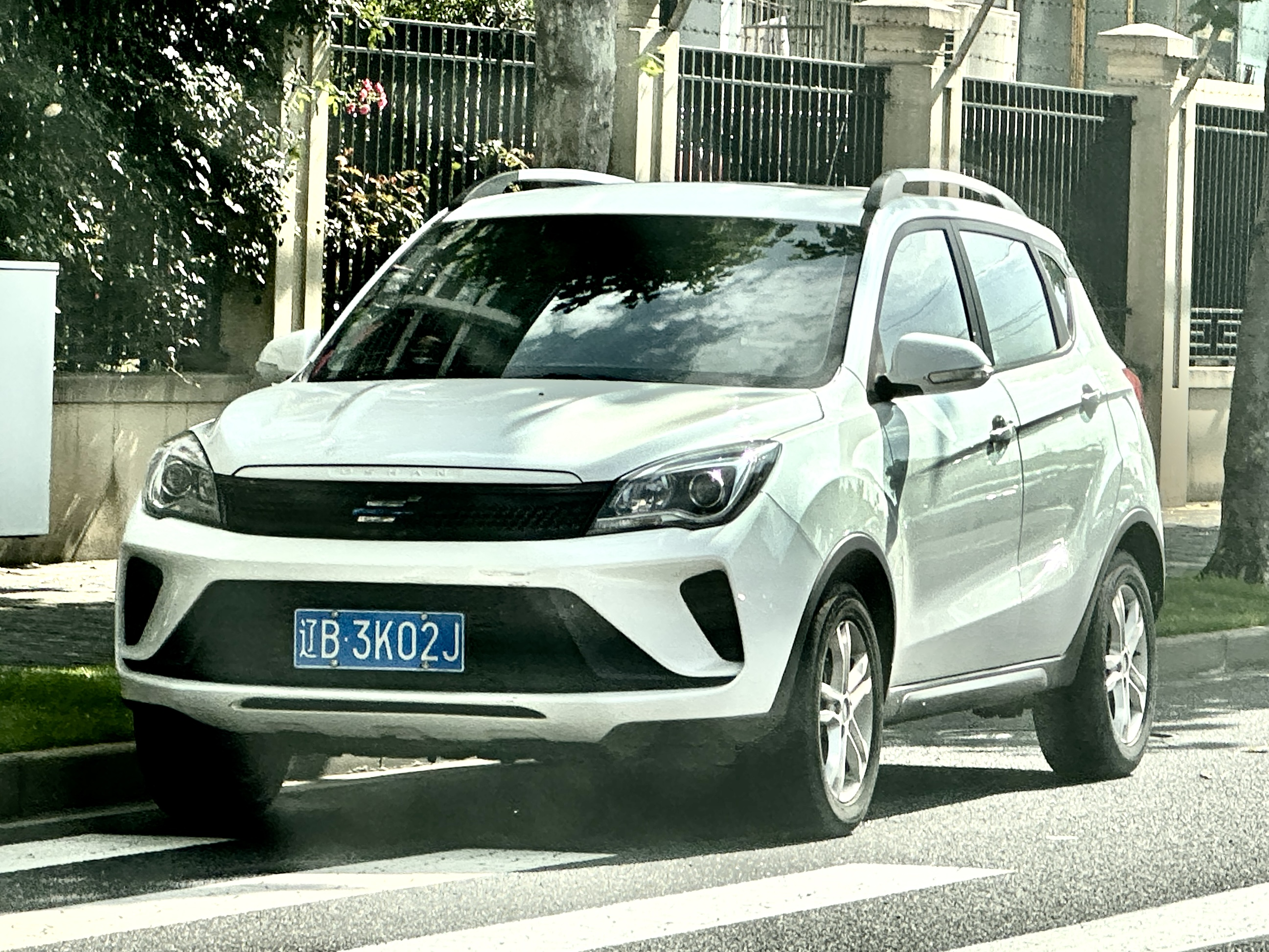
Oshan COS5° 2021 facelift
