= JMEV =

Chinese car manufacturer

Jiangxi Jiangling Group New Energy Vehicle Co., Ltd.
- Type: Joint venture
- Traded as: JMEV
- Industry: Automotive
- Founded: 15 January 2015; 11 years ago
- Headquarters: Nanchang, China
- Area served: China
- Products: Electric cars
- Owners: Renault SAS (50%); JMCG (37%); China Agricultural Development Construction Fund Corporation (13%)

Chinese name
- Simplified Chinese: 江西江铃集团新能源汽车有限公司
- Traditional Chinese: 江西江鈴集團新能源汽車有限公司
Transcriptions
Standard Mandarin
- Hanyu Pinyin: Jiāngxī Jiānglíng Jítuán Xīn Néngyuán Qìchē Yǒuxiàn Gōngsī

JMEV
- Simplified Chinese: [江西]江铃集团新能源[汽车] (Note: The parts between brackets are often omitted.)
- Traditional Chinese: [江西]江鈴集團新能源[汽車]
- Literal meaning: [Jiangxi Jiangling Group new energy vehicles]
Transcriptions
Standard Mandarin
- Hanyu Pinyin: [Jiāngxī] Jiānglíng Jítuán Xīn Néngyuán [Qìchē]
- IPA: [tɕjáŋɕí tɕjáŋlǐŋ tɕǐtʰwǎn ɕín nə̌ŋɥɛ̌n tɕʰìʈʂʰɤ́]
- Website: www.jmev.com

Jiangxi Jiangling Group New Energy Vehicle Co., Ltd. (traded as JMEV) is a joint venture headquartered in Nanchang, China, and owned by Groupe Renault (as a majority holder), Jiangling Motors Corporation Group (JMCG) and China Agricultural Development Construction Fund Corporation. JMEV is focused on the development and production of electric cars and was established in 2015 as a subsidiary of JMCG. It was reorganised as a joint venture in July 2019, after Renault acquired a majority stake.

As of 2023, its cumulative sales of electric vehicles have exceeded 100,000.

== History ==
In 2014, Jiangling Motors announced the creation of a branch centred on electric cars. On 15 January 2015, Jiangling Motors Corporation Group established a new subsidiary called JMEV. The first car produced by JMEV, the E100, entered production at a Nanchang plant that same year. In 2016, the company opened an electric vehicle test and development centre and started production of a new car, the E200. That year, it got certifications from the government to produce electric cars. In 2017, the company launched two models: the E160 and E200S. It also got permission to produce and sell cars independently of JMCG. In April 2018, the company began building a new production base at Kunming with the capacity to assemble up to 100,000 cars per year. That year, JMEV launched the E400. In October 2019, the Kunming plant started producing EX5s.

In December 2018, French manufacturer Renault announced it would acquire a "significant" JMEV stake. In July 2019, Renault completed the acquisition of a 50% JMEV stake through capital increase while JMCG and China Agricultural Development Construction Fund Corporation kept a 37% and 13% respectively. The company was reorganised as a joint venture.

In mid-2023, all four Renault representatives left the board after Renault decided to fully divest its stake in the brand due to poor sales and financial problems.

== Models ==
=== Current ===
==== JMEV EV3 (previously E300) ====
A hatchback, equipped with a 35 kilowatts (48 PS) motor and a 32 kWh battery.

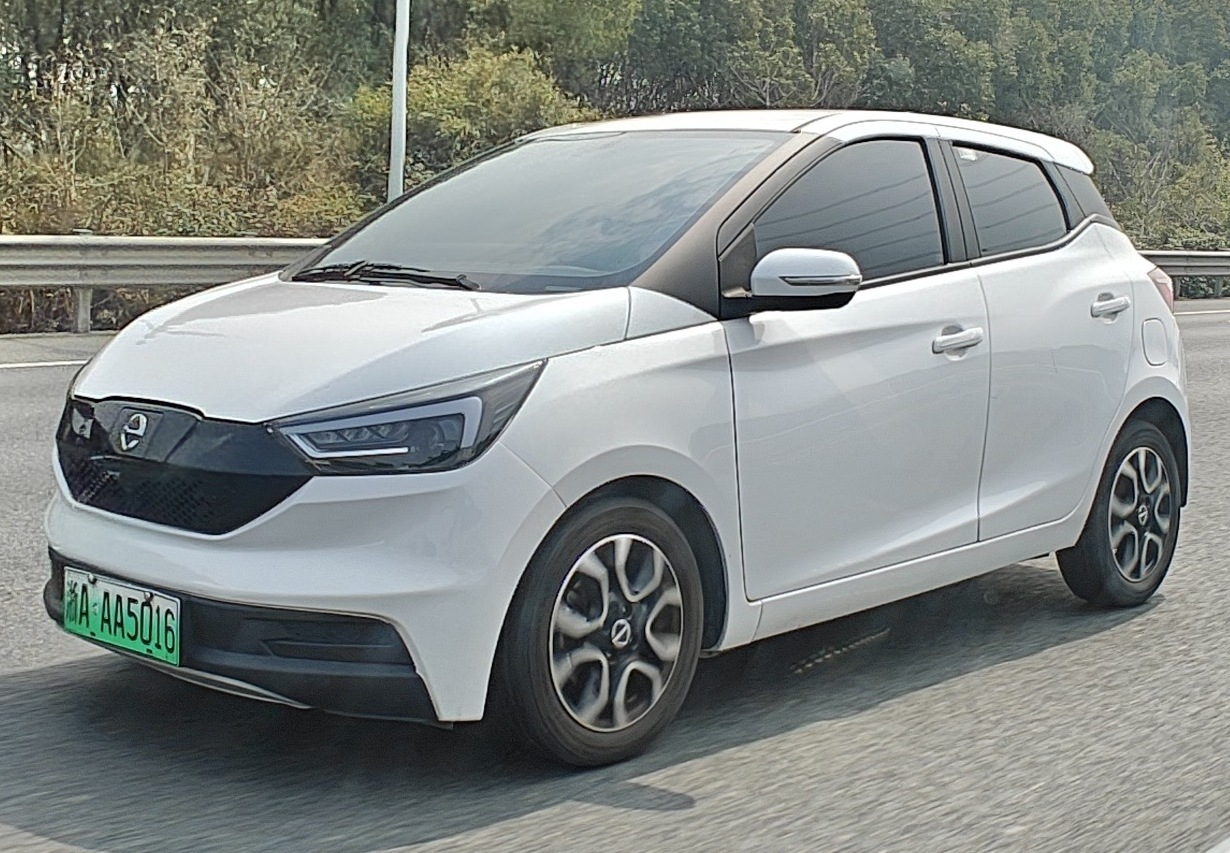
JMEV EV3

==== JMEV Xiaoqilin ====
The JMEV Xiaoqilin is an electric city car launched in 2023 originally called the EV2.

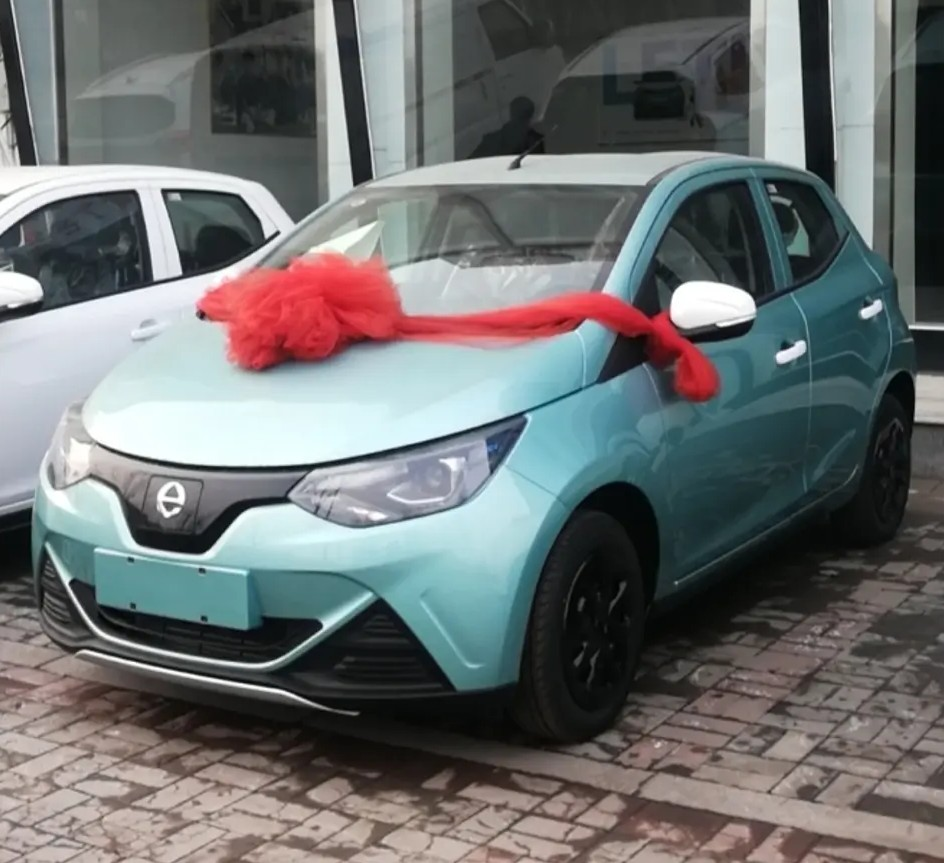
JMEV Xiaoqilin

==== Yichi 01 / SC01 ====
The Yichi 01 (羿驰01) is an electric two-seat coupé. Originally named the SC01, it was developed by Chinese start-up Small Sports Car (SSC) in 2023 and features a mid-mounted battery positioned behind the cockpit and two electric motors with one positioned at the front and one at the rear. The combined power output is 429 brake horsepower (320 kW; 435 PS) allowing it to accelerate from 0–100 km/h (62 mph) in under 3.9 seconds. SSC claims a range of 500 kilometres (311 mi) on the NEDC test cycle. As of January 2025, documents published by the Chinese Ministry of Industry and Information Technology unveils that the SC01 will now be part of JMEV's product line and was renamed the Yichi 01.

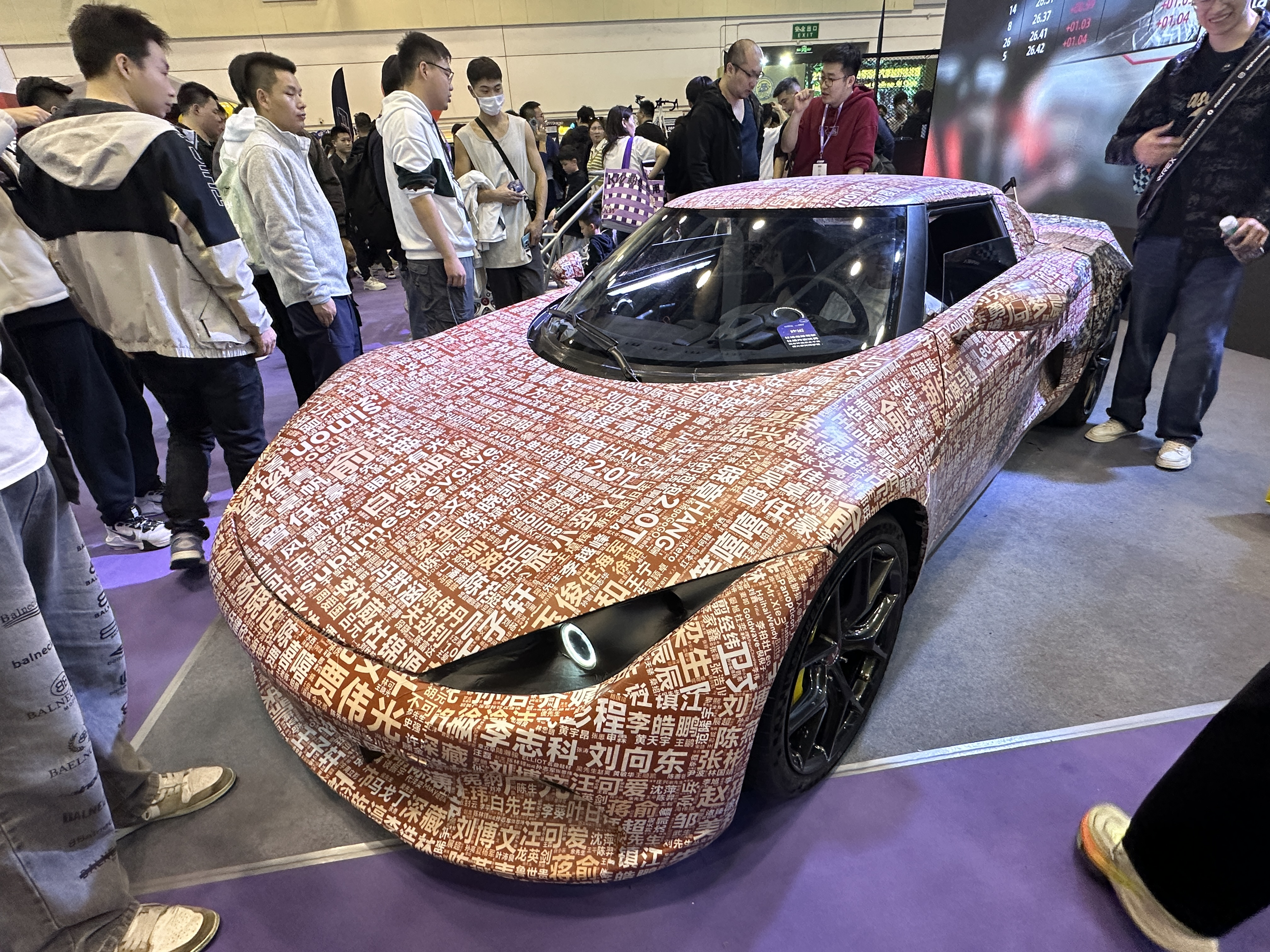
SSC SC01 prototype

==== Yichi 05 / JMEV Yi (GSE) ====
A compact sedan with a 147 horsepower (110 kW; 149 PS) motor and an expected NEDC range of up to 400 kilometres (249 mi).

In September 2021, Renault announced the intention to market the Yi in Europe as a subscription-only vehicle for professional drivers as the Mobilize Limo.

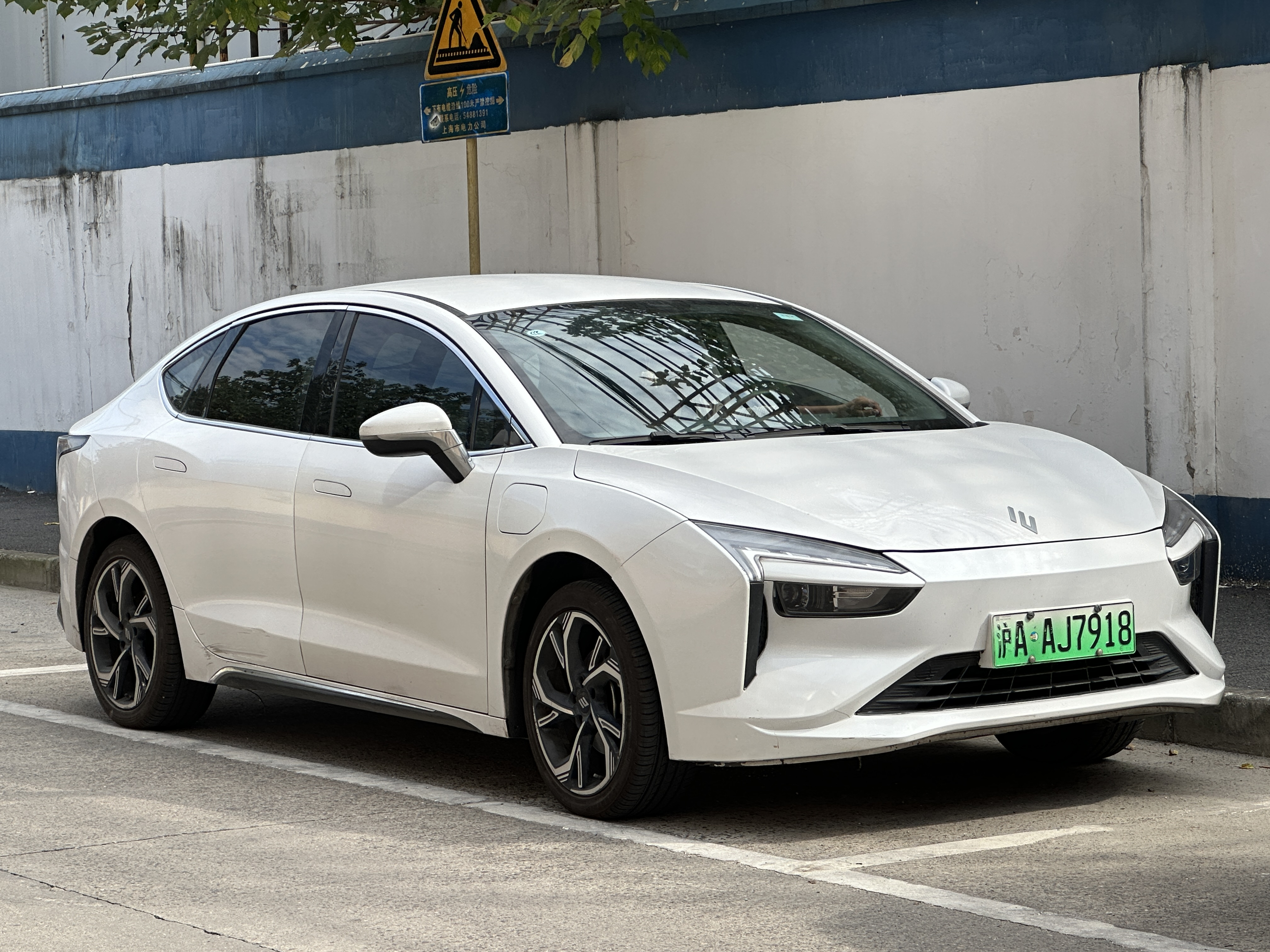
JMEV Yi (GSE)

==== Yichi 05S ====
A compact SUV, a rebadged LS Auto LEV 01

==== Yichi 06 ====
The Yichi 06 (颐驰06), originally named the Yichi RT6, is the product in cooperation with Baidu's Apollo autonomous self-driving platform called the Apollo Go. The Yichi 06 is part of a driverless taxi service launched in October 2024, and is now only operating in China. The Yichi 06 takes form of an electric minivan featuring minimalistic styling, rear sliding doors and is offered as a four-seater vehicle. The dimensions are 4765/1885/1715 mm, with a wheelbase of 2830 mm. The Yichi 06 has a single electric motor producing 110 kW (147 hp) to the front axle and is powered by an LFP swappable battery. The Yichi 06's battery pack can be replaced in three minutes.

=== Previous ===
==== E100 ====
The E100, a hatchback, has a length of 3,427 millimetres (134.9 in) and a wheelbase of 2,260 millimetres (89 in).

The car has a 104 Ah lithium-ion battery pack. The motor delivers up to 22 kilowatts (30 PS). Its top speed is 100 km/h (62 mph).

==== E160 ====
The E160, a saloon, has a length of 3,994 millimetres (157.2 in), a width of 1,626 millimetres (64.0 in), a height of 1,505 millimetres (59.3 in) and a wheelbase of 2,260 millimetres (89 in). The 19.8 kWh battery pack is coupled to a motor with a maximum power output of 35 kilowatts (48 PS) and torque output of 165 newton-metres (122 lb⋅ft).

==== E200 ====
The E200, a hatchback, has a length of 3,805 millimetres (149.8 in), a width of 1,560 millimetres (61 in), a height of 1,485 millimetres (58.5 in) and a wheelbase of 2,345 millimetres (92.3 in). The 17 kWh battery pack is coupled to an electric motor delivering a power of 30 kilowatts (41 PS) and a torque of 150 newton-metres (111 lb⋅ft). The estimated range is 154 kilometres (96 mi). Suspension is made up of MacPherson struts on front and trailing arms on rear.

Versions with more powerful batteries, called the E200N, were introduced in 2018 and increased the vehicle range up to an estimated 302 kilometres (188 mi).

==== E200S ====
The E200S, a hatchback, has a length of 3,640 millimetres (143 in), a width of 1,570 millimetres (62 in), a height of 1,490 millimetres (59 in) and a wheelbase of 2,345 millimetres (92.3 in). The electric motor delivers a power of 30 kilowatts (41 PS) and a torque of 150 newton-metres (111 lb⋅ft).

==== JMEV EX5 ====
A CUV, previously known as the E400 and is based on the Landwind X2. The E400 SUV was renamed as EVeasy EX5 in September 2019. It has a battery pack of up to 41 kWh that supports fast charging, coupled to an electric motor delivering a power output of 90 kilowatts (122 PS). Its range is up to 400 kilometres (250 mi).

=== EVeasy models ===
EVeasy (Chinese: 易至; pinyin: Yìzhì) is a sub-marque introduced by JMEV at the 2018 Guangzhou Auto Show. The first model, a hatchback named EVeasy EV3 (originally named as E300), has an electric motor with a power of 50 kilowatts (68 PS) and a torque of 180 newton-metres (130 lb⋅ft); the maximum estimated range is 302 kilometres (188 mi). Sales started in March 2019.

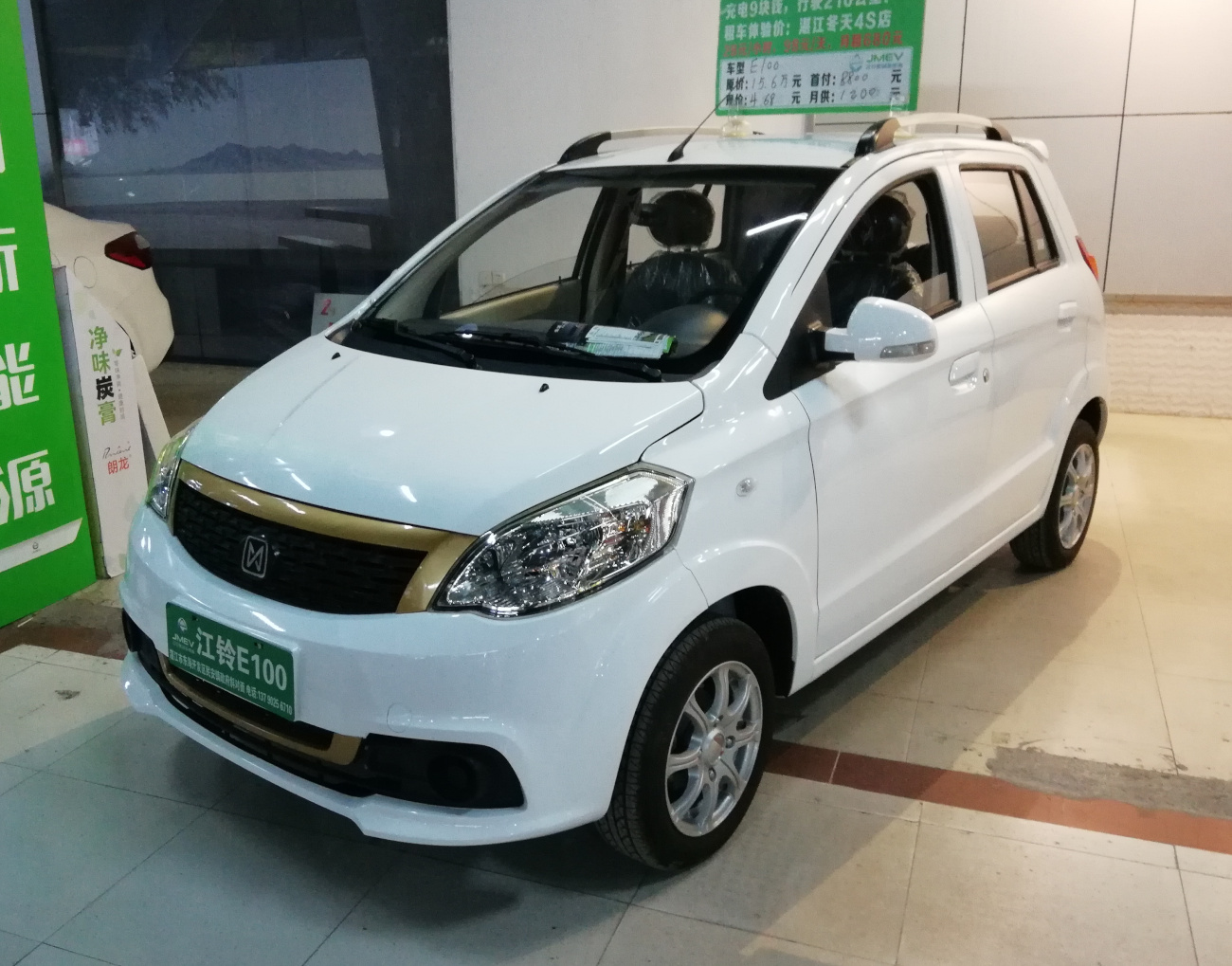
JMEV E100

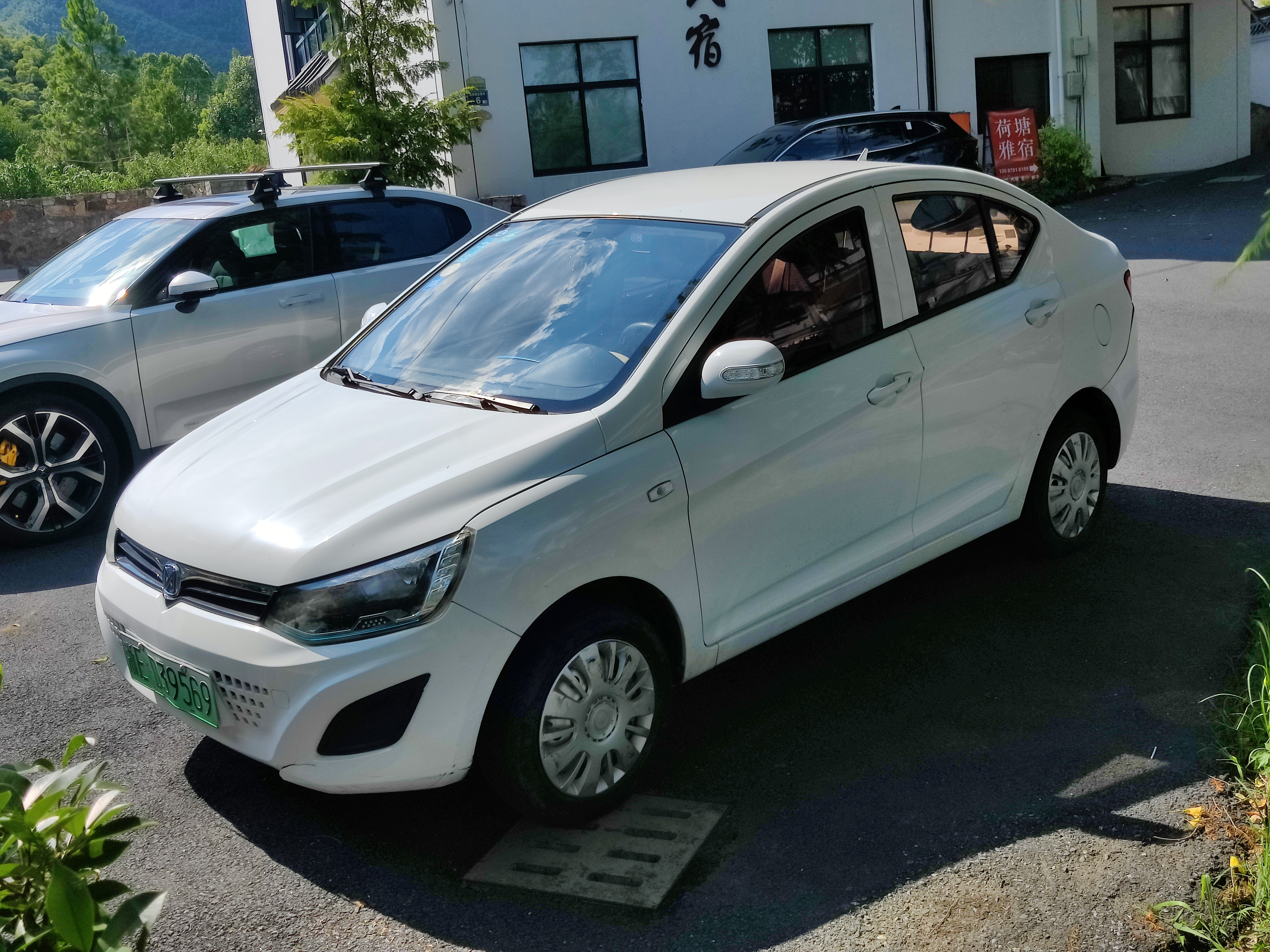
JMEV E160

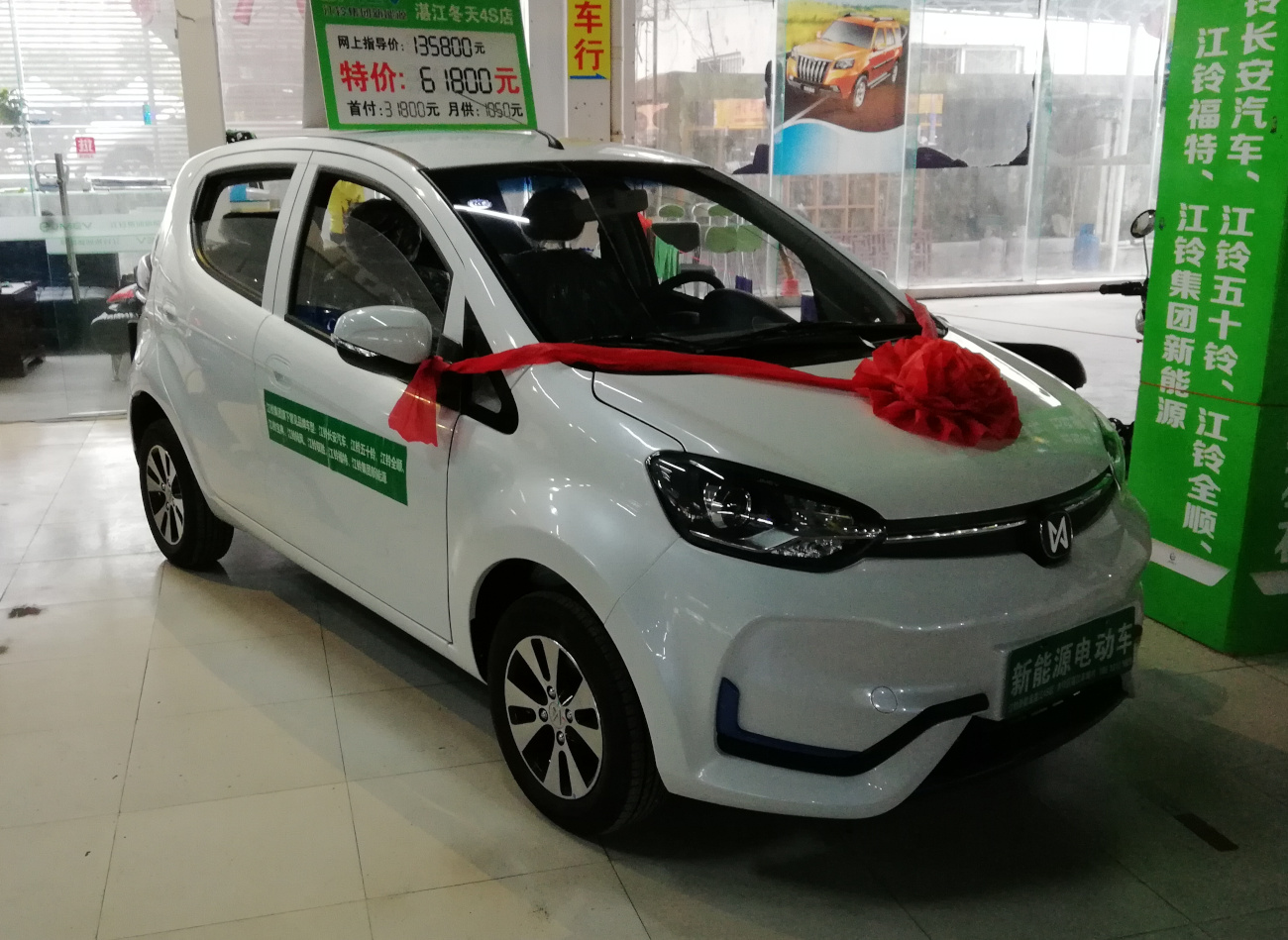
JMEV E200S

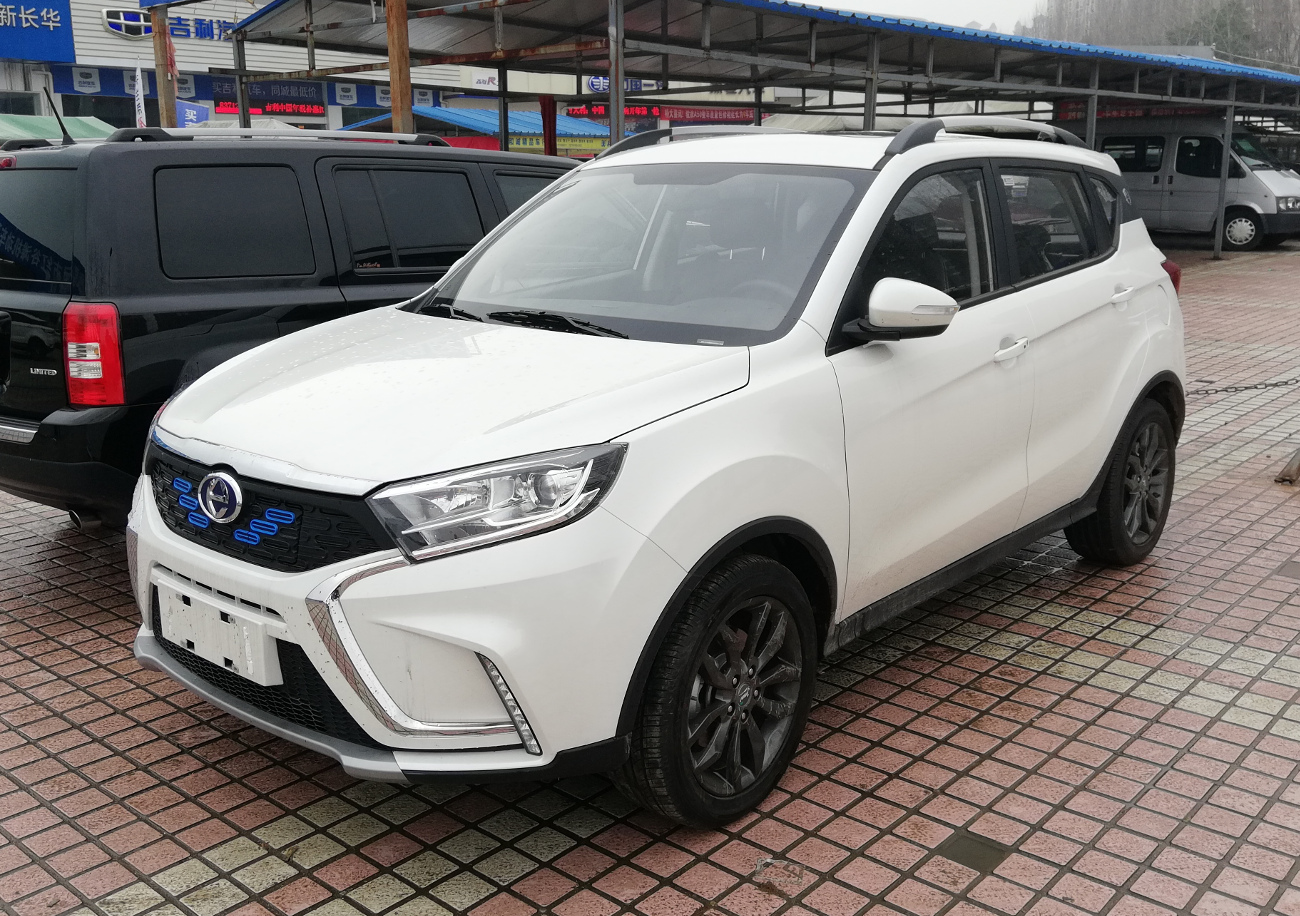
JMEV E400

==== Other Jiangling-named new energy vehicles ====
Besides JMEV products, Jiangling Motors and Jiangling Motor Group sell their own new energy vehicles directly, including the S330 SUV and the T500EV pickup.

== Branding ==
At first, JMEV vehicles used a similar badge logo as Jiangling Motors' Yusheng division. JMEV products either launched or updated from 2018 onwards adopted a lower case "e" letter as their badge logo.

The upper case "E" letter in the vehicles' designations stands for electric and followed by numbers representing the vehicles' rounded official range rating.

== See also ==
- Renault Korea
