= VinFast VF 2 =

VinFast Minio Green
- A Minio Green operating for Green SM in Hanoi.

Overview
- Manufacturer: VinFast
- Also called: VinFast Minio Green
- Production: August 2025 – present
- Assembly: Vietnam: Cát Hải, Haiphong

Body and chassis
- Class: City car (A)
- Body style: 3-door hatchback
- Layout: Rear-motor, rear-wheel-drive

Powertrain
- Electric motor: Permanent magnet synchronous
- Power output: 20 kW (27 PS; 27 hp)
- Battery: 14.7 kWh Li-ion
- Electric range: 120 km (75 mi) (Eco); 180 km (110 mi) (Plus) (NEDC)
- Plug-in charging: 12 kW (AC); 12 kW (DC)

Dimensions
- Wheelbase: 2,065 mm (81.3 in)
- Length: 3,090 mm (121.7 in)
- Width: 1,496 mm (58.9 in)
- Height: 1,659 mm (65.3 in)

The VinFast VF 2 is a battery electric city hatchback manufactured and marketed by Vietnamese carmaker, VinFast of Vingroup from 2025. The model went on sale in December 2025. It is also scheduled to be assembled in India by 2026.

== History ==
A Minio Green as displayed in a promotional event in Vietnam

The Minio Green was revealed by VinFast through a set of images on 9 January 2025, alongside three other "Green" models, which are the Limo Green, Nerio Green (based on the VinFast VF e34), and the Herio Green (based on the VinFast VF 5). These "Green" series are positioned as commercial, ride-sharing and taxi-oriented vehicles.

The model went on sale in December 2025 in Eco and Plus specifications.

In July 2026, VinFast revealed a non-taxi version called the VF 2.
