= Angkor EV =

Proposed Cambodian electric car

Angkor EV (mentioned in sources with various names including Angkor 333-1000, Angkor, Angkor EV 2011, Angkor EV 2013 and Angkor EV 2014) is a proposed Cambodian electric car developed by the company Heng Development.

== History ==
Various vehicles were developed under the name Angkor or Angkor 333–1000 as a private initiative of Nhean Phaloek. They were open-roof, two-seater microcars. Reliable technical specifications of these vehicles, of which the alleged third version caused an increased media interest, are not available.

As early as 2011, a mass-production version was announced. In early 2013, Heng Development presented a revised version of the closed-body model. At the same time, technical problems had allegedly been resolved.

By mid-2013, production had not started yet. In 2014, after investors withdrew from the project, Heng Development was looking for new ones.

For the production going ahead, an investment of US$100 million for a plant with about 300 employees was needed. However, mass-production can not be verified as of January 2019.

== Technical specifications ==
According to data given in 2014 by the car developer Phalleok, the vehicle would reach a speed of 60 km/h and have a range of up to 300 kilometres. The equipment would include GPS and keyless ignition system.

A possible price tag of US$10,000 was announced.

== See also ==
- VinFast
