= VinFast VF 9 =

Electric full-size crossover SUV

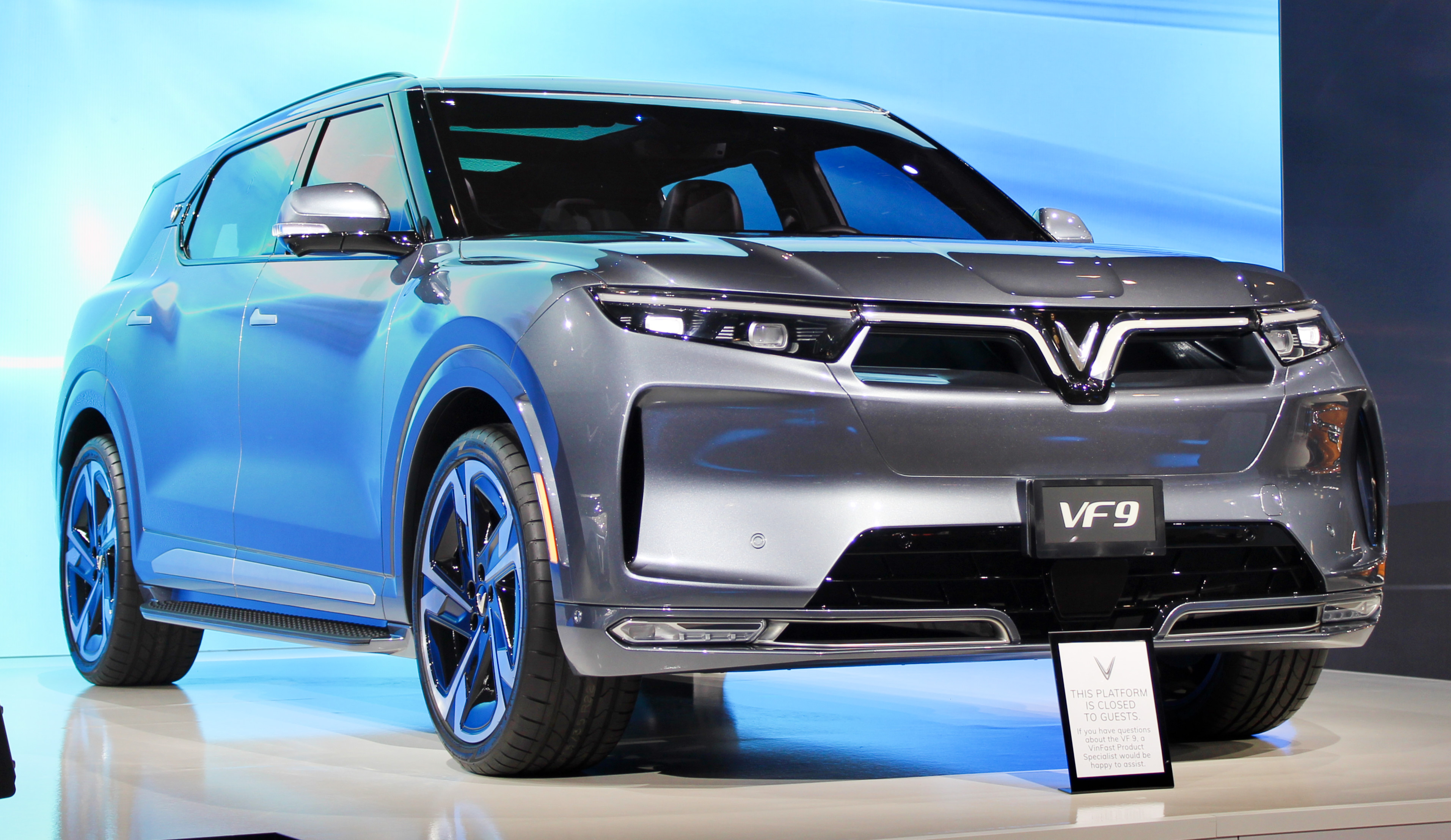

Overview
- Manufacturer: VinFast
- Also called: VinFast VF33; VinFast VF e36 VinFast Lạc Hồng 900 LX
- Production: 2022–present
- Model years: 2023–present
- Assembly: Vietnam: Cát Hải (VinFast Trading and Production LLC, Hai Phong Plant); United States: Chatham County, North Carolina (2028)
- Designer: Pininfarina

Body and chassis
- Class: Full-size SUV
- Body style: 5-door crossover SUV
- Layout: Dual-motor, all-wheel drive
- Platform: VinFast VMG-C/D

Powertrain
- Electric motor: 2x Permanent Magnet motors
- Power output: 402 hp (300 kW; 408 PS); 455 hp (339 kW; 461 PS) (Lạc Hồng 900 LX, armored)
- Battery: 92 or 123 kWh (usable capacity)

Dimensions
- Wheelbase: 3,150 mm (124.0 in)
- Length: 5,120 mm (201.6 in)
- Width: 2,000 mm (78.7 in)
- Height: 1,721 mm (67.8 in)

The VinFast VF 9 is an electric full-size SUV (E-segment) manufactured and marketed by VinFast of Vingroup from 2022.

== Overview ==
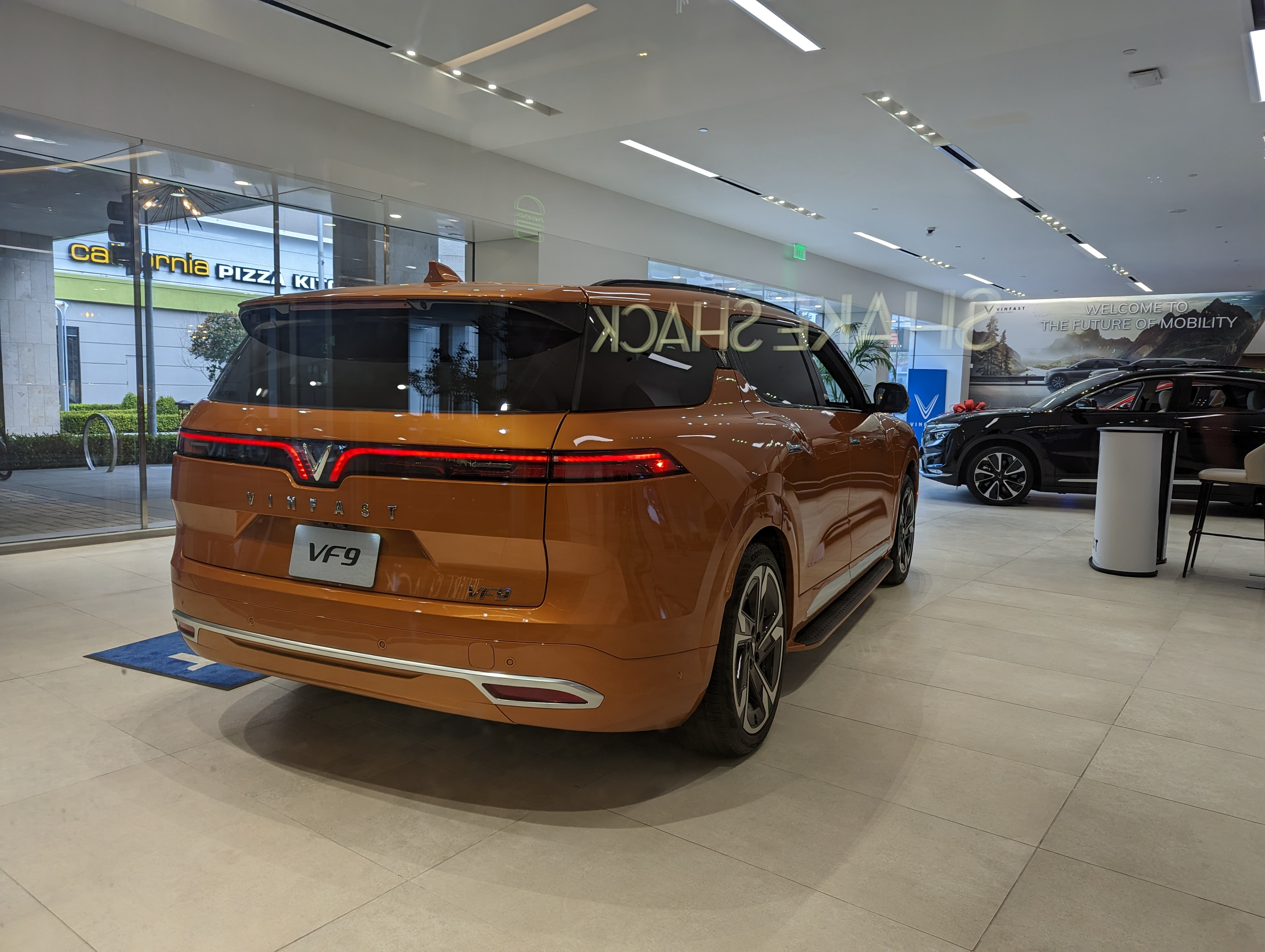
Rear view

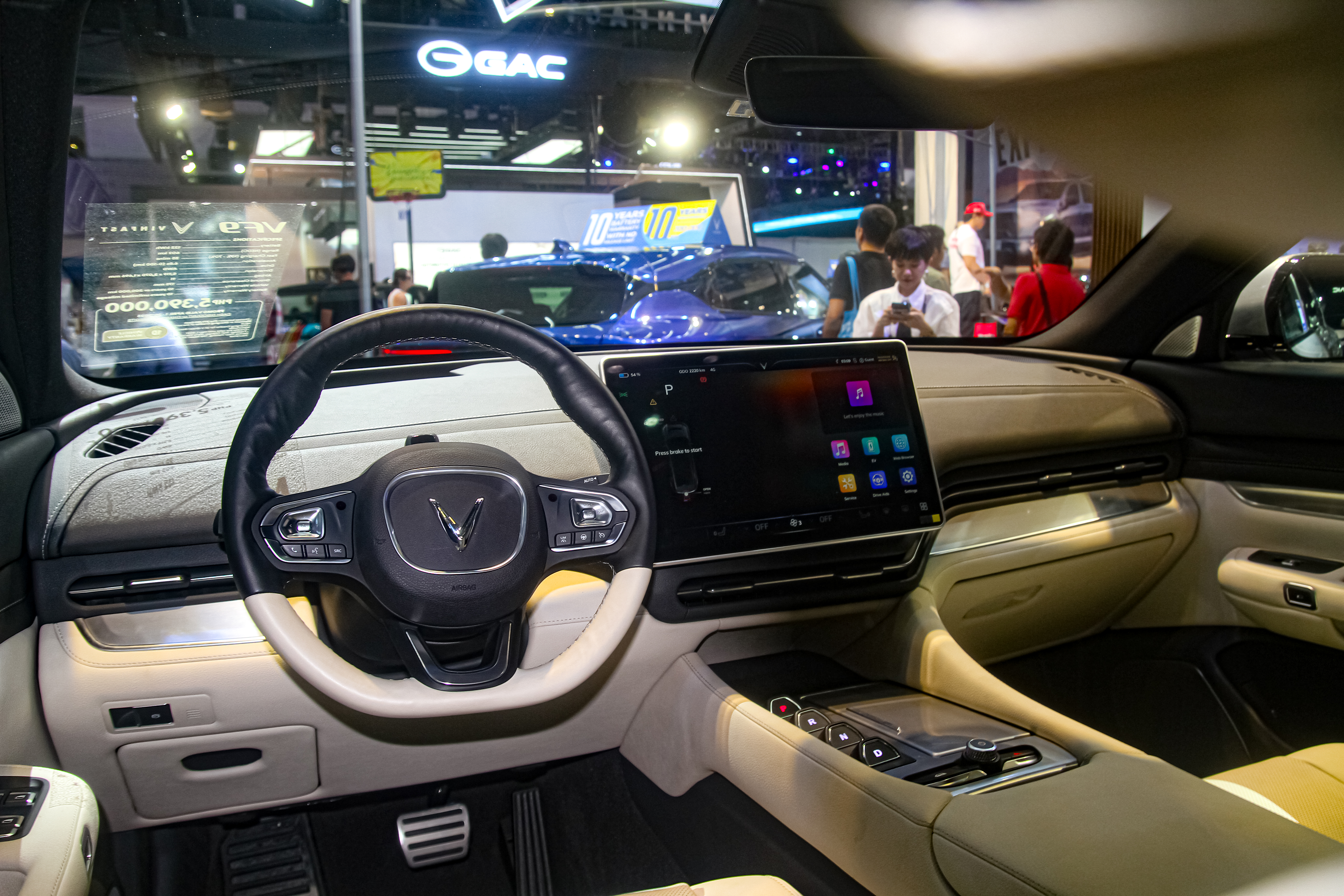
Interior

The full-size VF 9 model made its debut together with the smaller VF 6 and VF 8 models as the largest of the range of electric crossovers unveiled in January 2021, being the first vehicles of this type by the Vietnamese manufacturer.

The VF 9 is characterized by a massive silhouette with a length of over 5.1 metres, gaining an avant-garde stylized silhouette with a two-module window line, as well as narrow strips of headlamps and rear lamps consisting of Matrix LED lighting. Characterized by AWD, the vehicle accommodates a maximum of 7 people on three rows of seats.

The passenger cabin has been kept in a minimalist design, gaining a massive, 15.4-inch touch screen displaying not only the multimedia system indications but also the onboard computer and speedometer information due to its integration with the instrument cluster.

Like the smaller VF 8, the VF 9 went on sale in Vietnam in September 2021, with the first units delivered in February 2022. The vehicle is also part of the global expansion of VinFast, in mid-2022 it went on sale, among others, in Australia, Europe and North America.

The VF 9 is offered as a dual motor variant consisting of a battery with a capacity of 106 kWh, developing 402 hp (300 kW; 408 PS). The vehicle will be able to travel approximately 482 kilometres (300 mi) on a single charge.

=== VinFast Lạc Hồng 900 LX ===
The VinFast Lạc Hồng 900 LX is a luxury version of the VF 9 that was co-developed with Canadian security company INKAS and is also available in a bulletproof version. It is exclusively available with the 123 kWh battery option. The non-armored version produces 402 horsepower, the armored version makes 455 horsepower.

The 900 LX is rated to German VPAM VR7 standards and can withstand a variety of rifle fire and up to two simultaneous grenade blasts. INKAS notes that to achieve the German standards requires a test of the full vehicle, and not just parts and materials, and the test car withstood more than 400 rounds shot at it and multiple explosive blasts. Options include an oxygen supply, fire suppression system, emergency lights and sirens, and a satellite phone. These features are shared with other models armed by INKAS.

Both the armored and unarmored variant were delivered to Vietnam's Ministry of Foreign Affairs on August 28, 2025.
