= VinBus =

Vietnamese bus transit company

VinBus Ecology Transport Services LLC
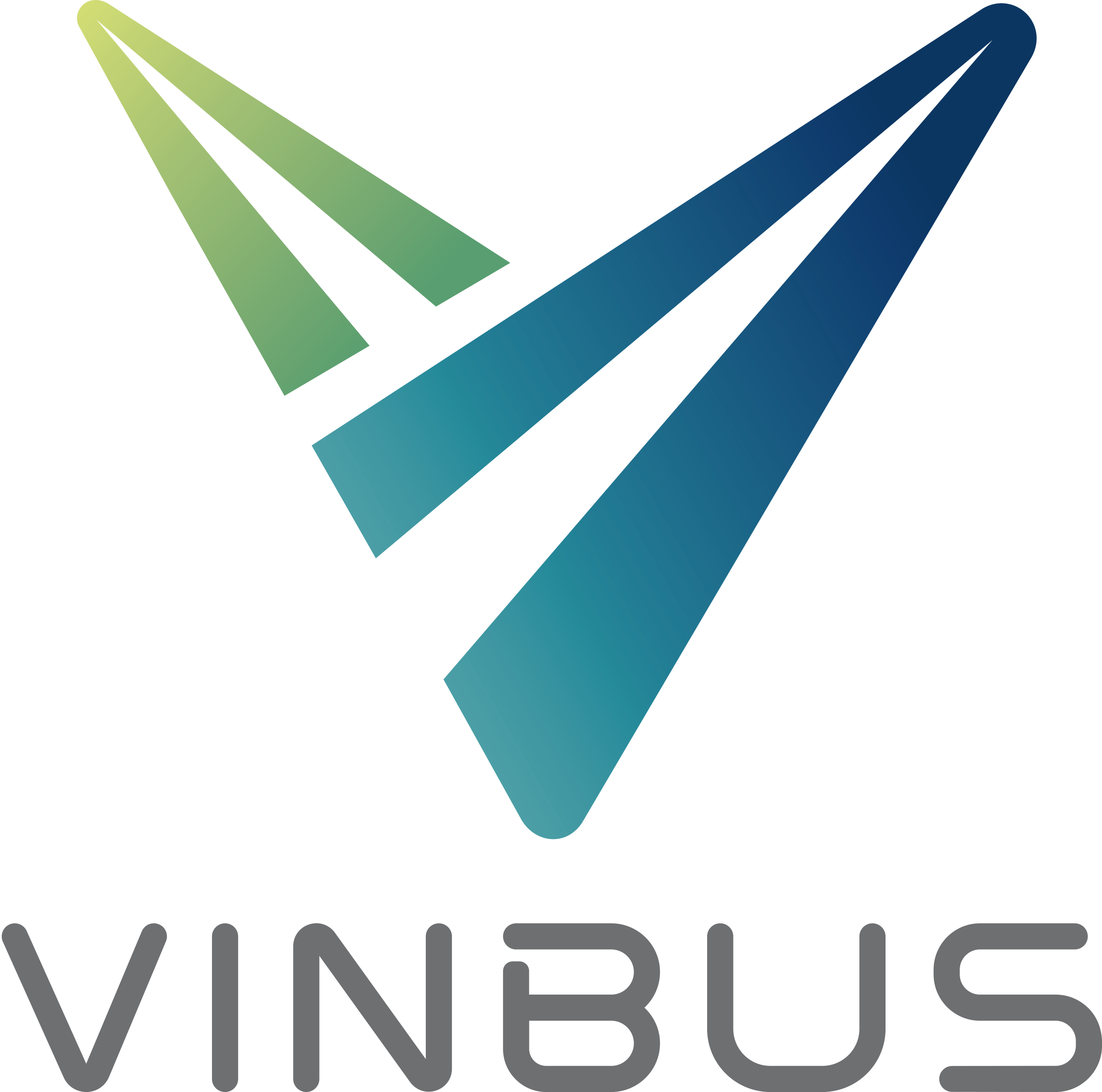

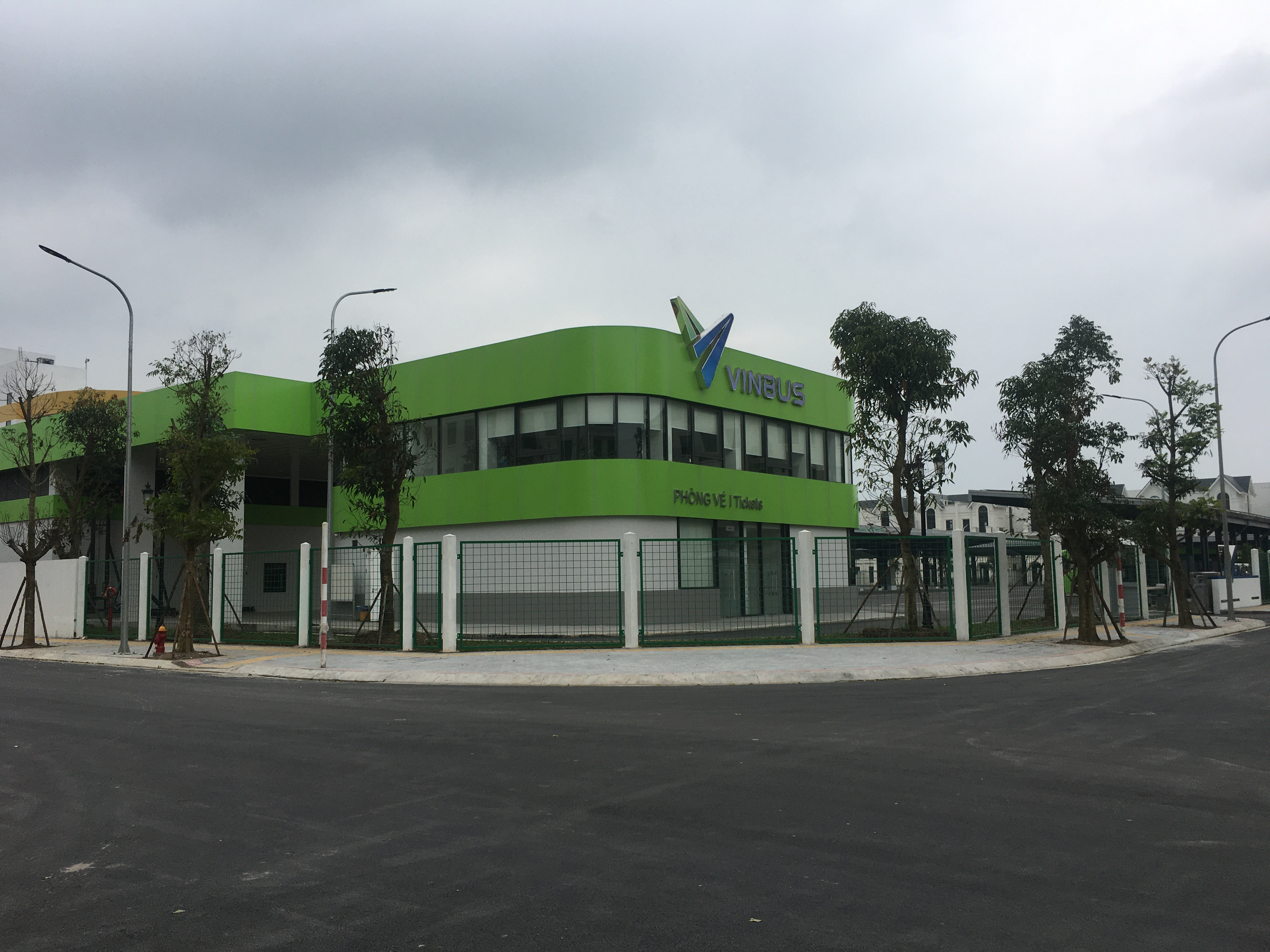
- VinBus headquarters and depot at Vinhomes Ocean Park development
- Trade name: VinBus LLC
- Type: Subsidiary
- Founded: May 2, 2019; 7 years ago
- Area served: Vietnam
- Brands: VinBus
- Parent: Vingroup
- Website: vinbus.vn

VinBus Ecology Transport Services LLC (Vietnamese: Công ty TNHH Dịch vụ Vận tải Sinh thái VinBus), is a Vietnamese privately operated non-profit bus route network service established by Vingroup in 2019 and the alternative branding for VinFast's electric bus series.

== History ==
The VinBus subsidiary was announced by Vingroup on May 2, 2019, with transit service starting in March 2020 and the deployment of 3,000 electric buses planned through the future.

== Electric bus ==
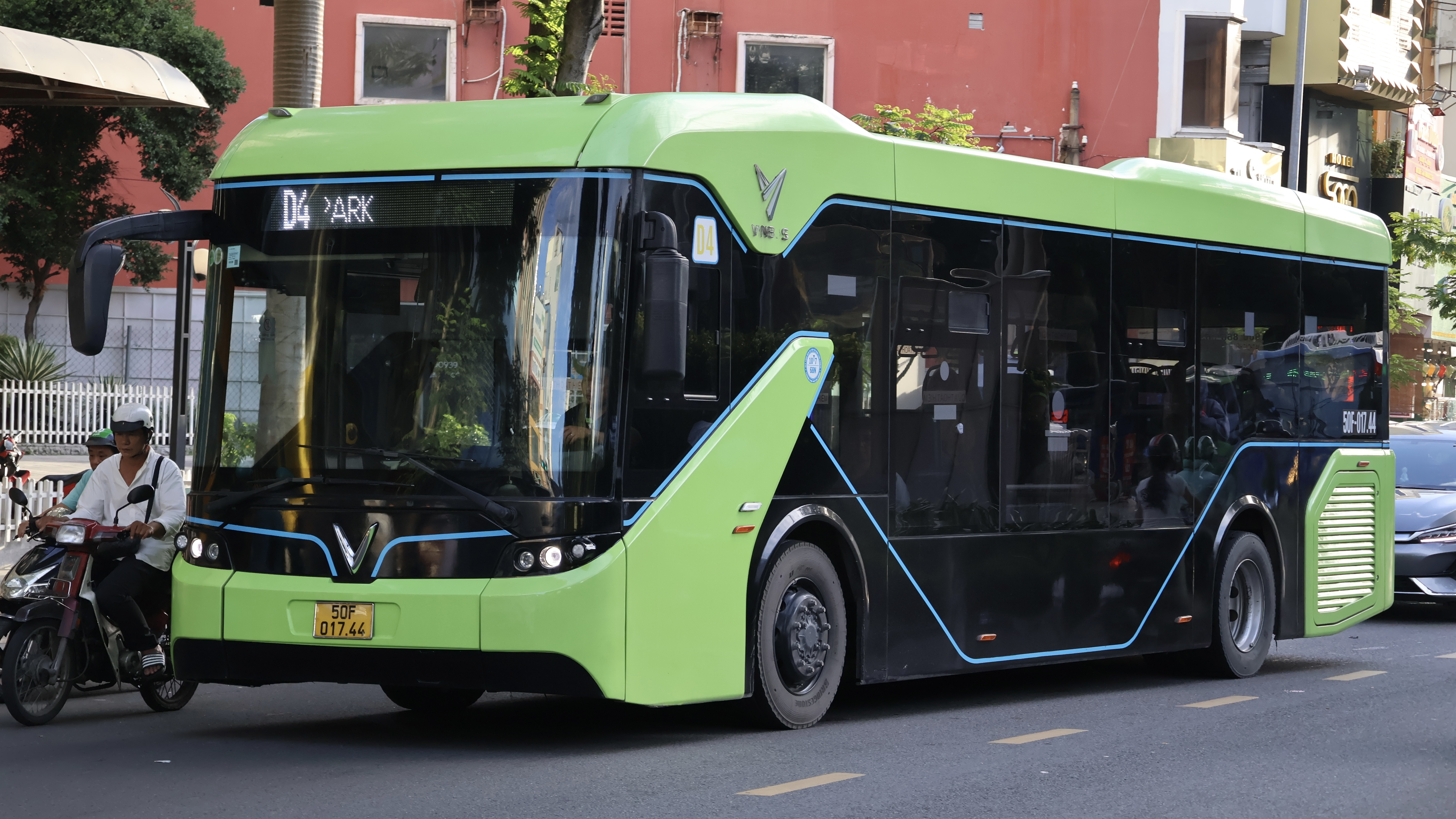
A VinBus operating in Ho Chi Minh City

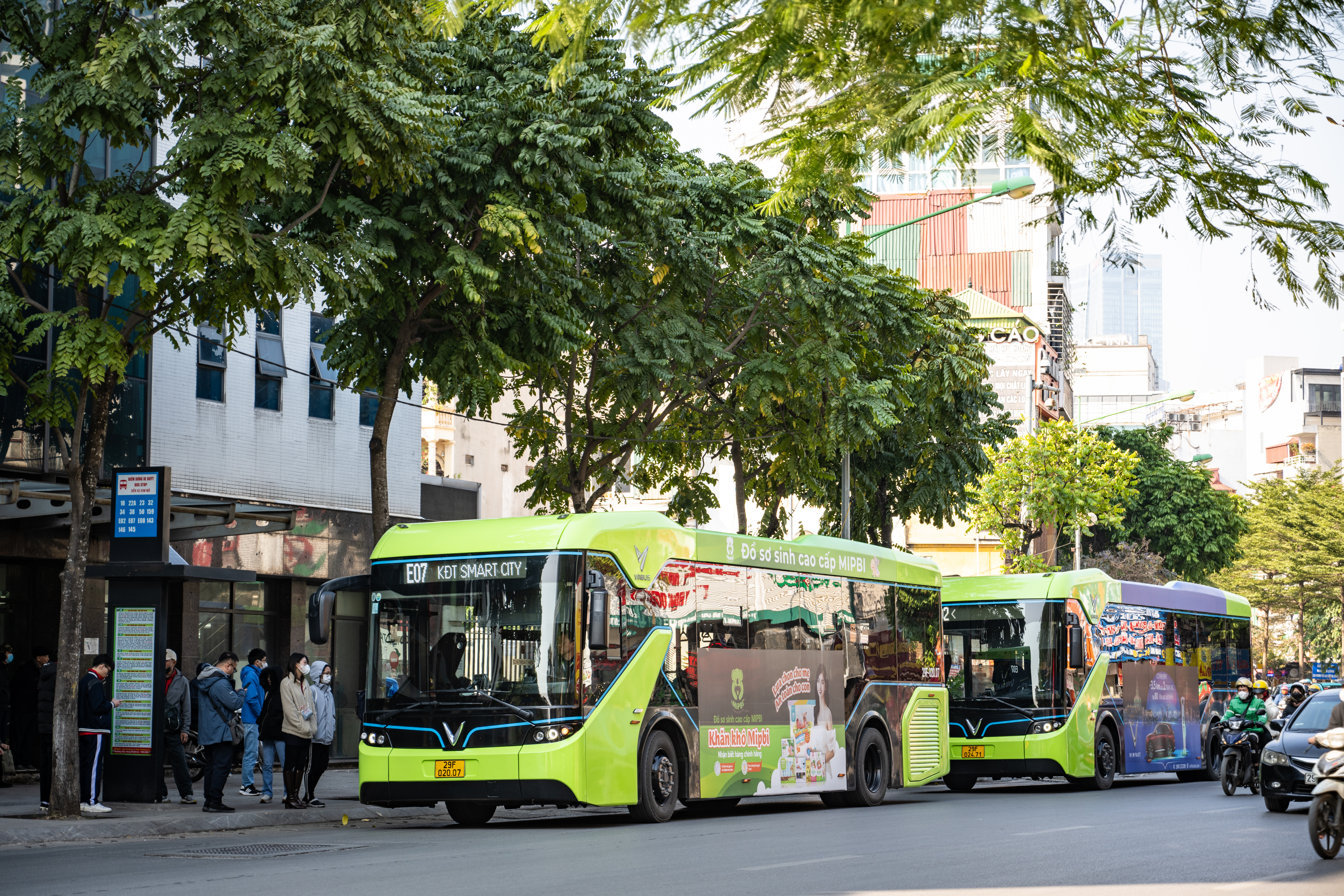
A pair of VinBuses in Kim Ma, Hanoi

The VinBus-branded low-floor electric city bus is produced by VinFast, Vingroup's automotive subsidiary, at the company's Automobile Manufacture Complex located in Hai Phong. The bus is powered by a 281 kWh battery pack which gives the bus up to 260 km (160 mi) of range. Using the VinBus-designated 150 kWh DC fast-charging stations provided by StarCharge, the battery can be charged within ~2 hours. Batteries used by the VinBus fleet are provided by a joint venture between VinFast and LG Chem, while other components are supplied by Siemens.

== Transit service ==
VinBus currently operates three bus transit networks in the cities of Hanoi, Ho Chi Minh City, Haiphong and Phú Quốc City.
