= VinFast VF 6 =

Battery electric subcompact crossover SUV

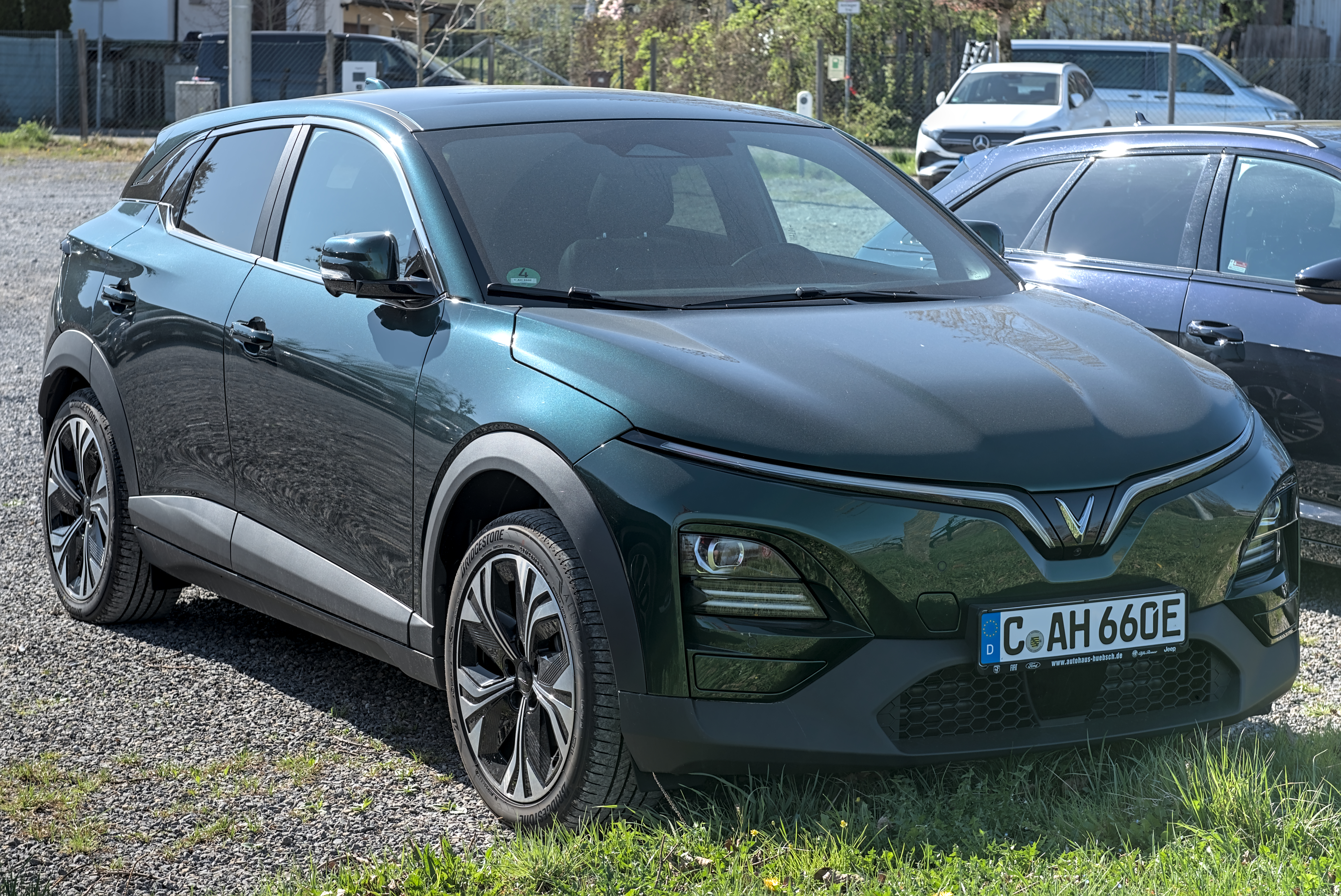
- VinFast VF6 (Europe)

Overview
- Manufacturer: VinFast
- Production: 2024-present
- Assembly: Vietnam: Cát Hải (VinFast Trading and Production LLC, Hai Phong Plant); India: Thoothukudi, Tamil Nadu (VinFast India)
- Designer: Pininfarina and Torino Design

Body and chassis
- Class: Subcompact SUV (B-segment)
- Body style: 5-door crossover SUV
- Layout: Front motor, front-wheel-drive
- Platform: VinFast VMG-A/B

Powertrain
- Electric motor: 130 kW (174 hp) (Eco); 150 kW (201 hp) (Plus)
- Battery: 59.6 kWh LFP
- Range: 399 km (248 mi) (WLTP)

Dimensions
- Wheelbase: 2,730 mm (107.5 in)
- Length: 4,239 mm (166.9 in)
- Width: 1,821 mm (71.7 in)
- Height: 1,595 mm (62.8 in)

The VinFast VF 6 is a battery electric subcompact SUV that produced and marketed by VinFast from 2024. On 6 January 2022, the model was presented for the first time at the Consumer Electronics Show, and was shown in full at the 2022 Paris Motor Show.

== Overview ==
The model has infotainment technology that allows users to stream videos, play games, shop online or control their smart home devices as part of the Smart Service subscription package.

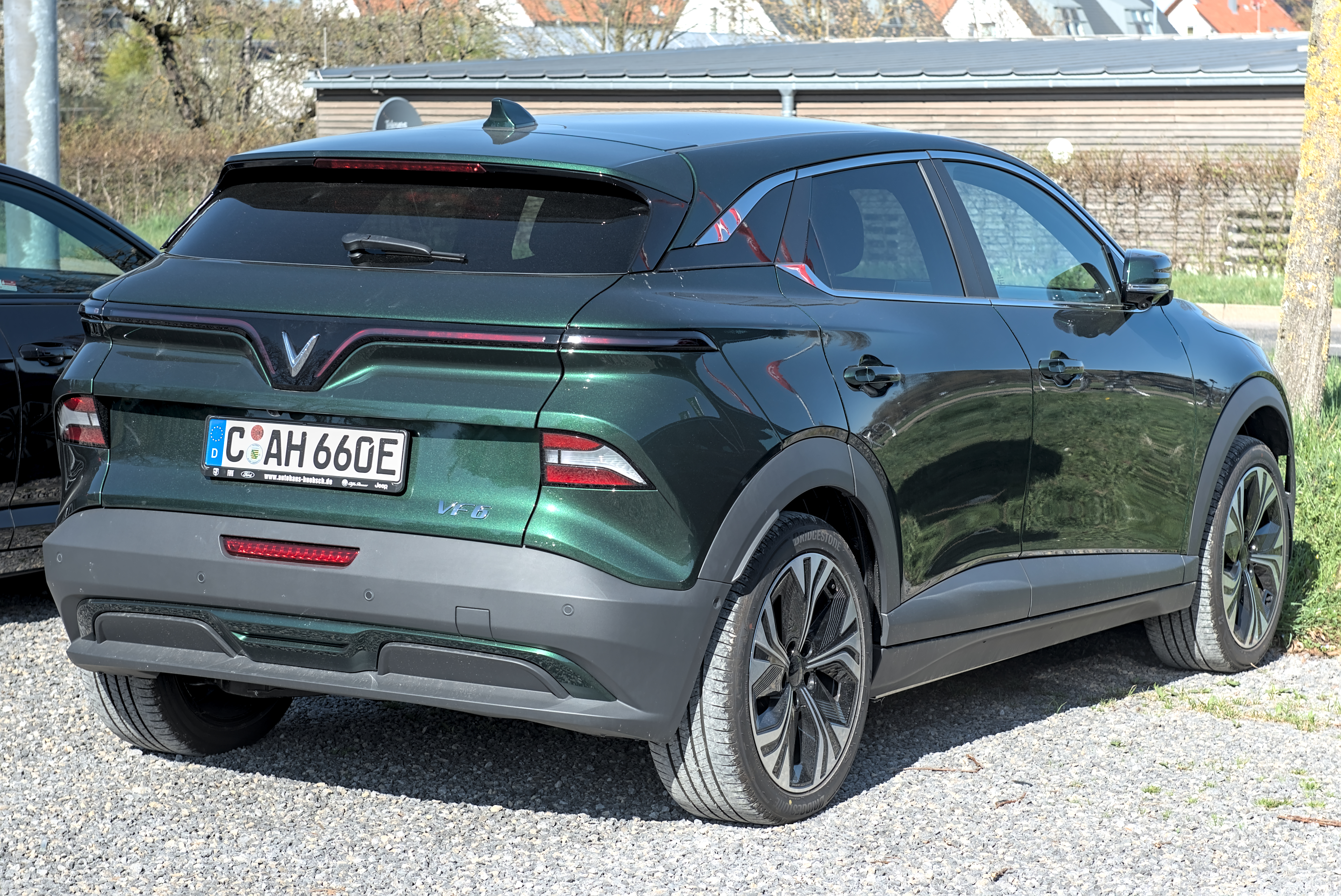
Rear view

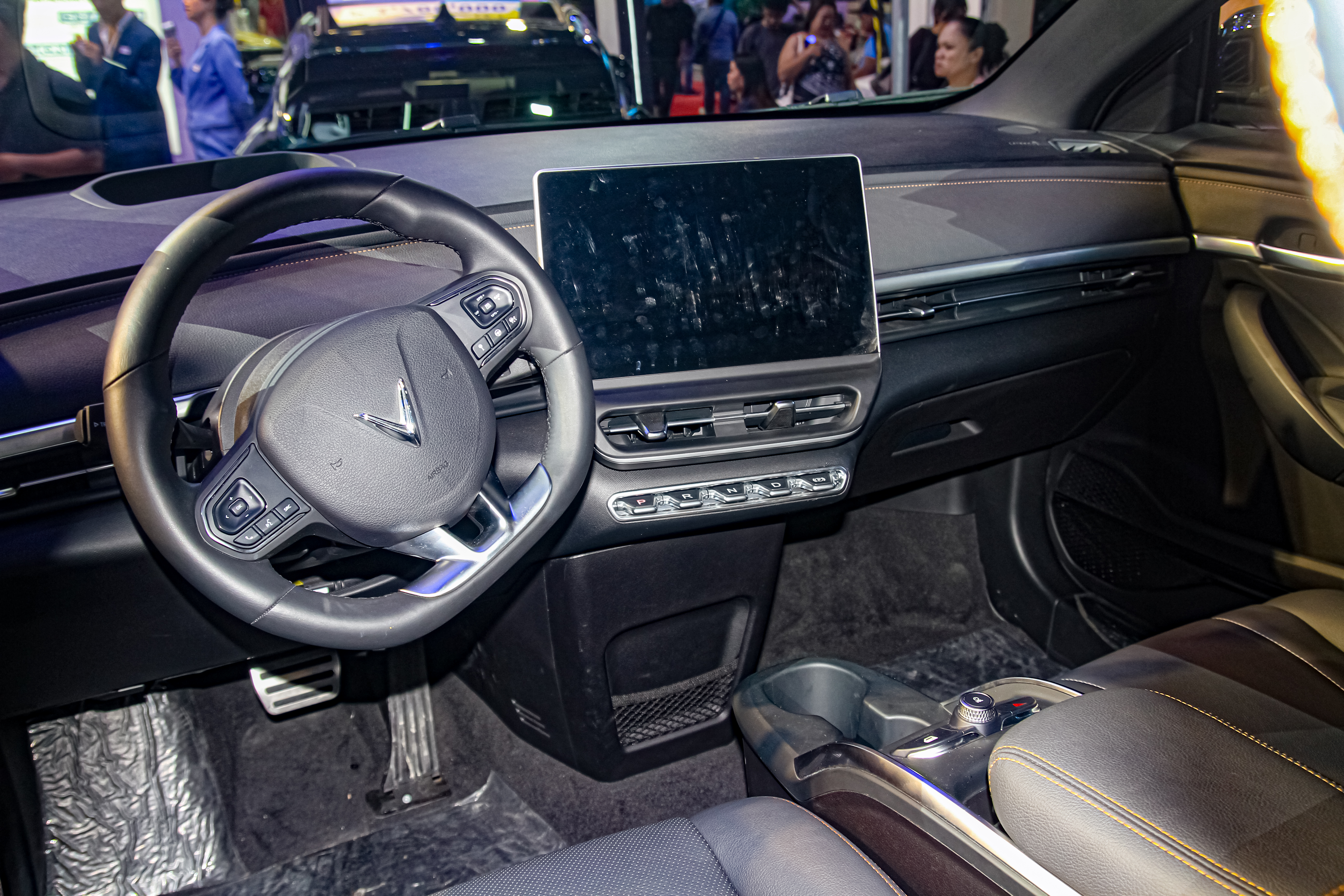
Interior

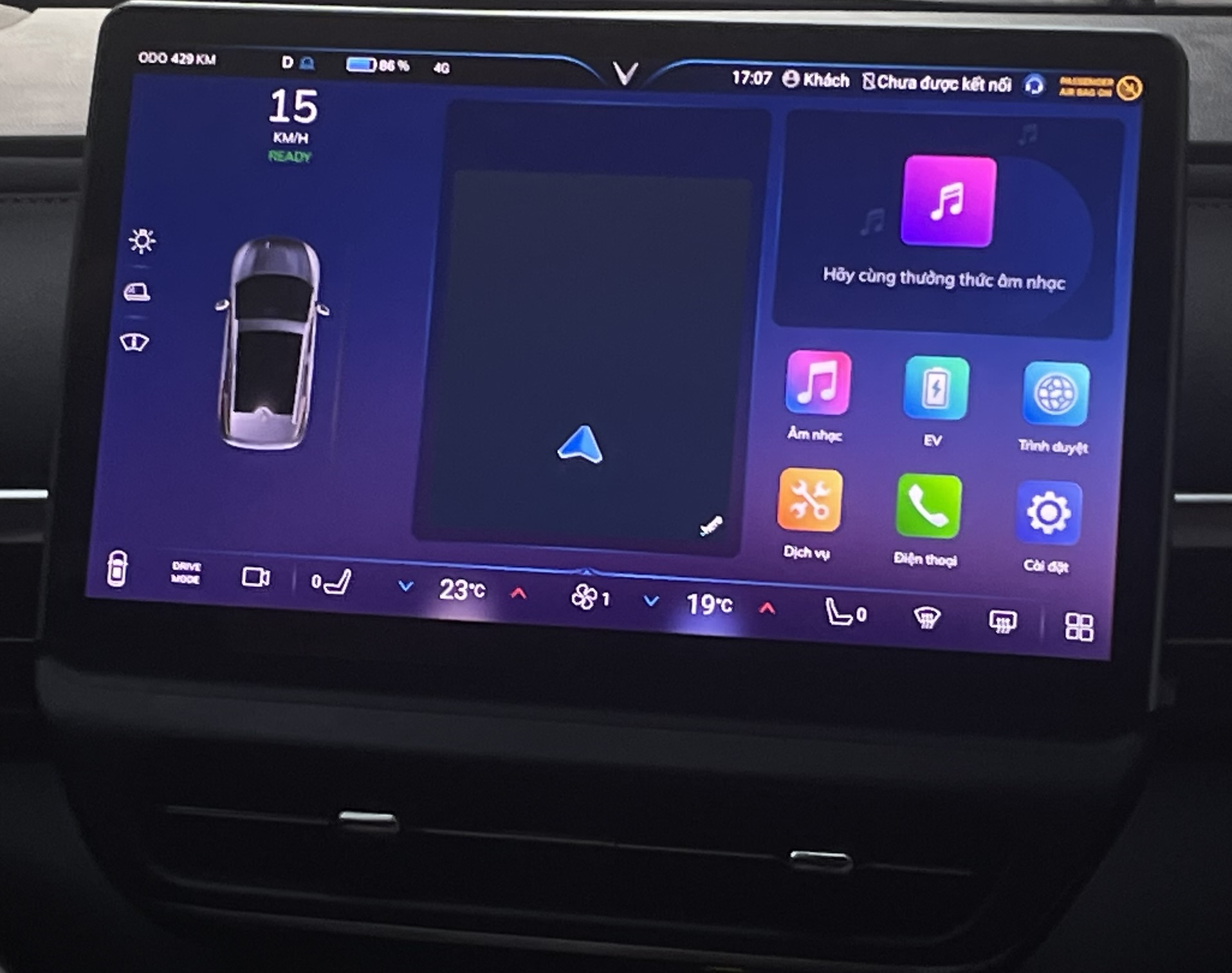
Infotainment

== Safety ==
Bharat NCAP test results Vinfast VF6 (2026, based on Latin NCAP 2016)
Test	Score	Stars
Adult occupant protection	27.13/32.00	5 /5 stars
Child occupant protection	44.41/49.00	5 /5 stars
