= Lê Thị Thu Thủy =

Businesswoman

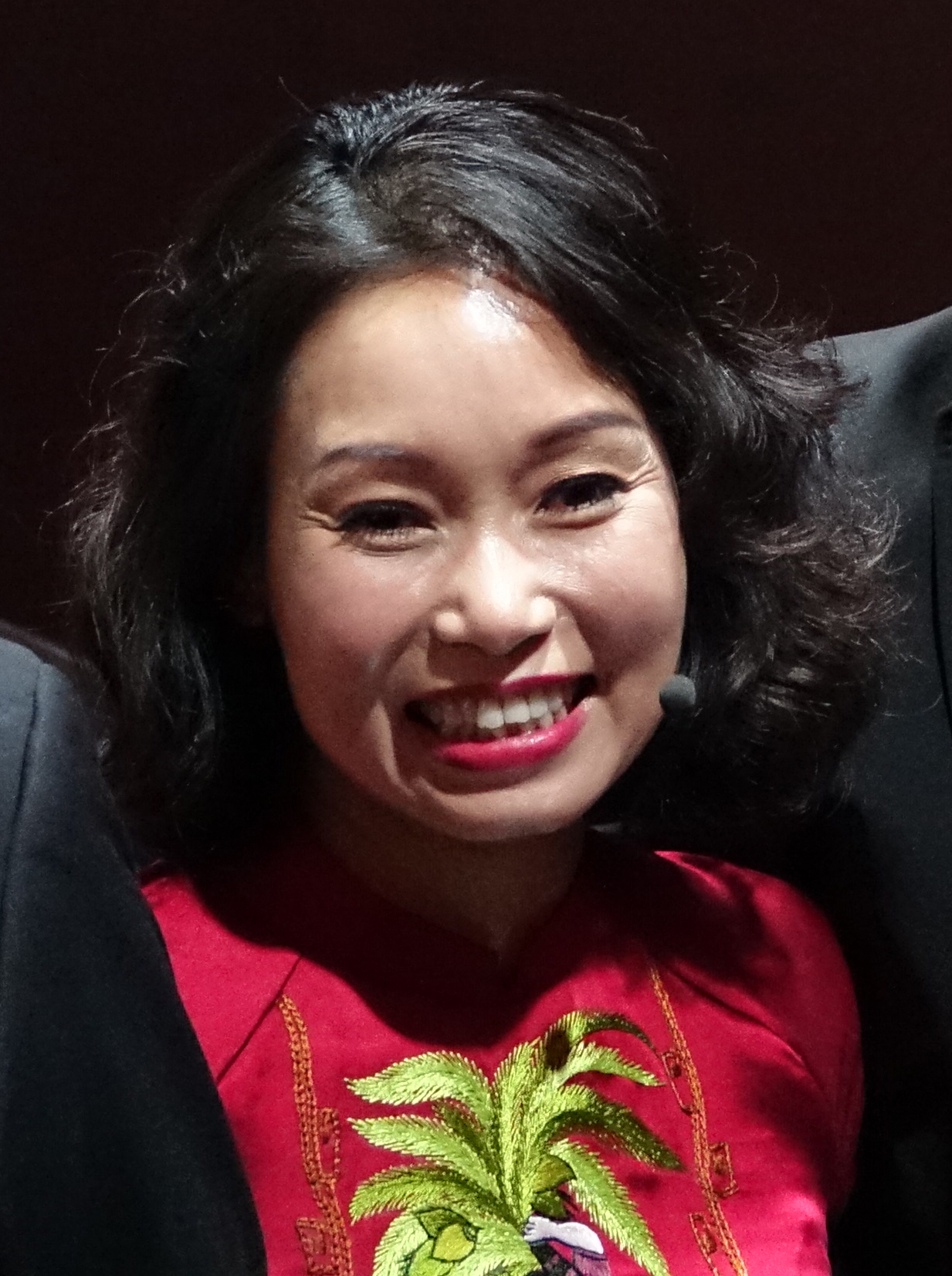
- Thủy in 2018
- Born: 1974 (age 51–52); Bình Định, Vietnam
- Other name: Madame Thủy
- Education: Bachelor, Hanoi Foreign Trade University
- Occupation: Vice-chair of Vingroup

Lê Thị Thu Thủy (born 1974), better known as Madame Thủy, is a Vietnamese businesswoman, vice-chairwoman of the conglomerate Vingroup and chief executive of its automotive wing VinFast.

== Career ==
Thủy was born in 1974 in Bình Định and graduated with a bachelor's degree in economics from Hanoi Foreign Trade University. She joined Vingroup in 2008 after a managerial role for human resources firm Navigos and played a role in VinFast's formation.

In 2021, Thủy was made Global CEO of VinFast, overseeing operations in the Vietnamese, North American and European markets as the brand transitioned to electric vehicle manufacturing. She stepped down from this position in 2024, with Phạm Nhật Vượng taking over.
