= Torino Design =

Italian car design studio

Torino Design is an Italian car design studio based in Turin, Italy. It was established in March 2006 by Roberto Piatti and Giuliano Biasio, who previously worked at Bertone where Piatti was managing director for ten years and Biasio was design director.

== Designs ==
- GAC A-HEV Concept (2007)
- Chery QQ3 Second Generation (2013)
- Maxus G10 (2014)
- Torino Design Super Sport Concept (2016)
- VinFast VF 6 (2022)
- VinFast VF 7 (2022)
- Vinfast VF 5 (2023)
