= VinFast VF e34 =

Electric compact crossover SUV

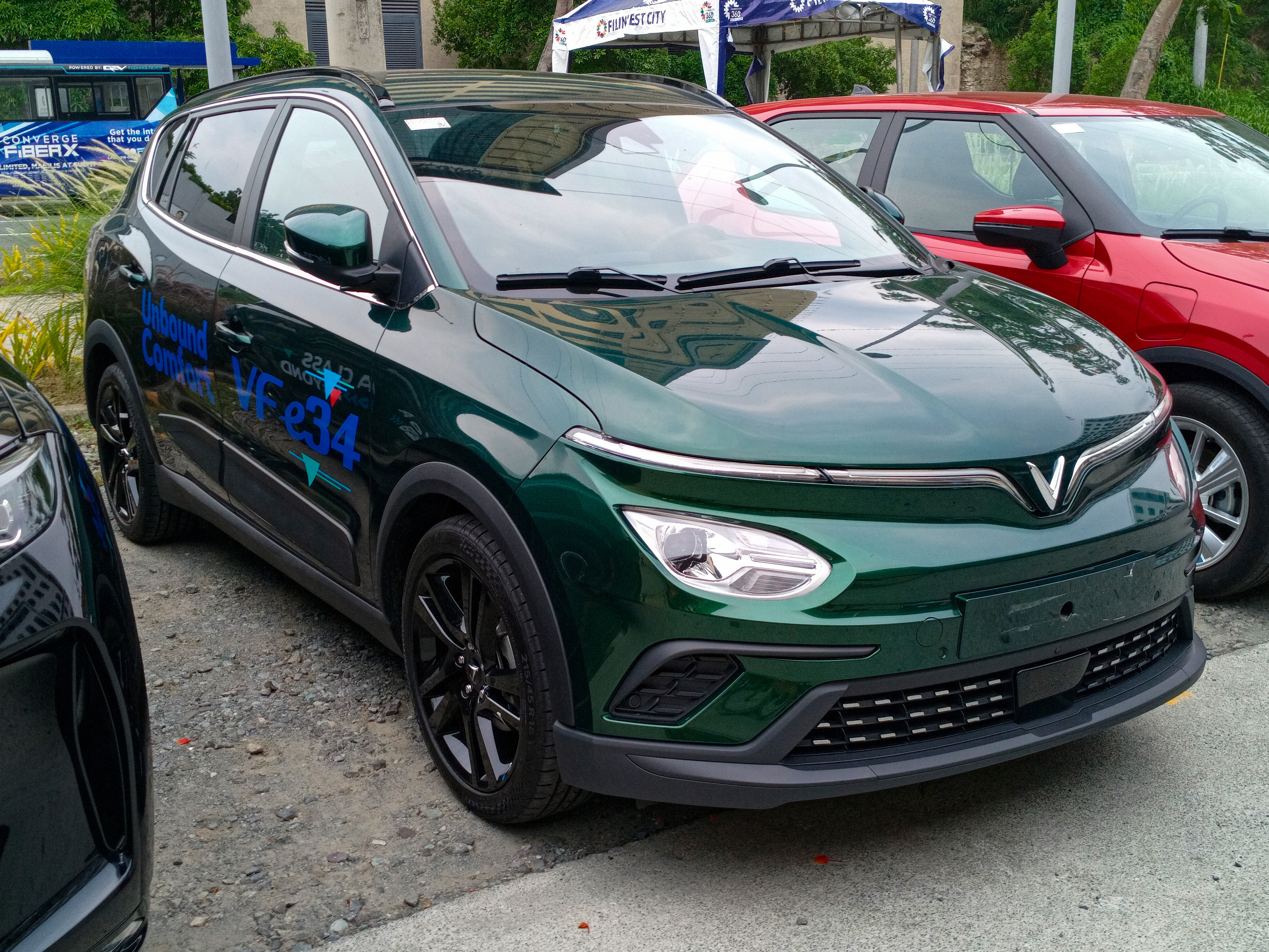

Overview
- Manufacturer: VinFast
- Also called: VinFast Nerio Green (2025–present); VinFast Limo Green (Indonesia, Green SM taxi version, 2024–2025)
- Production: 2021–present
- Assembly: Vietnam: Cát Hải, Haiphong

Body and chassis
- Class: Subcompact SUV (B-segment)
- Body style: 5-door crossover SUV
- Layout: Front-motor, front-wheel-drive

Powertrain
- Electric motor: 110 kW (148 hp; 150 PS) Permanent magnet
- Battery: 44.5 kWh lithium-ion
- Electric range: 300 km (186 mi) (claimed); 285 km (177 mi) (NEDC)
- Plug-in charging: 250 kW DC, 7.4 kW AC

Dimensions
- Wheelbase: 2,611 mm (102.8 in)
- Length: 4,300 mm (169.3 in)
- Width: 1,793 mm (70.6 in)
- Height: 1,613 mm (63.5 in)
- Curb weight: 1,490 kg (3,285 lb)

The VinFast VF e34, also known as VinFast Nerio Green, is a battery electric subcompact SUV (B-segment) manufactured by VinFast of Vingroup since 2021.

Since 2025, the model was renamed to VinFast Nerio Green in Vietnam and Indonesia to reflect its focus as a commercial, ride-sharing and taxi-oriented vehicle, however, it remains on sale to retail consumers. Prior to the renaming, the Green SM taxi version in Indonesia was badged as VinFast Limo Green. Since then, the Limo Green nameplate was transferred to an MPV/minivan model.

== Overview ==
In the second half of January 2021, VinFast officially introduced the range of its first electric cars, consisting of three crossovers of different sizes. The smallest of them was the subcompact model called VF e34.

Codenamed VinFast SCP during development, the model was developed by Chinese-based original design manufacturer (ODM) Shanghai Launch Automotive Technology Co., Ltd., which operates internationally as LS Auto, alongside the "VinFast VFe32" (released as the VinFast VF 5).

In December 2021, the first batch of 100 Vinfast VF e34s were delivered to Vietnamese customers, the VF e34 also marks VinFast's first battery electric vehicle model and the first ever electric vehicle to be manufactured and sold in Vietnam.

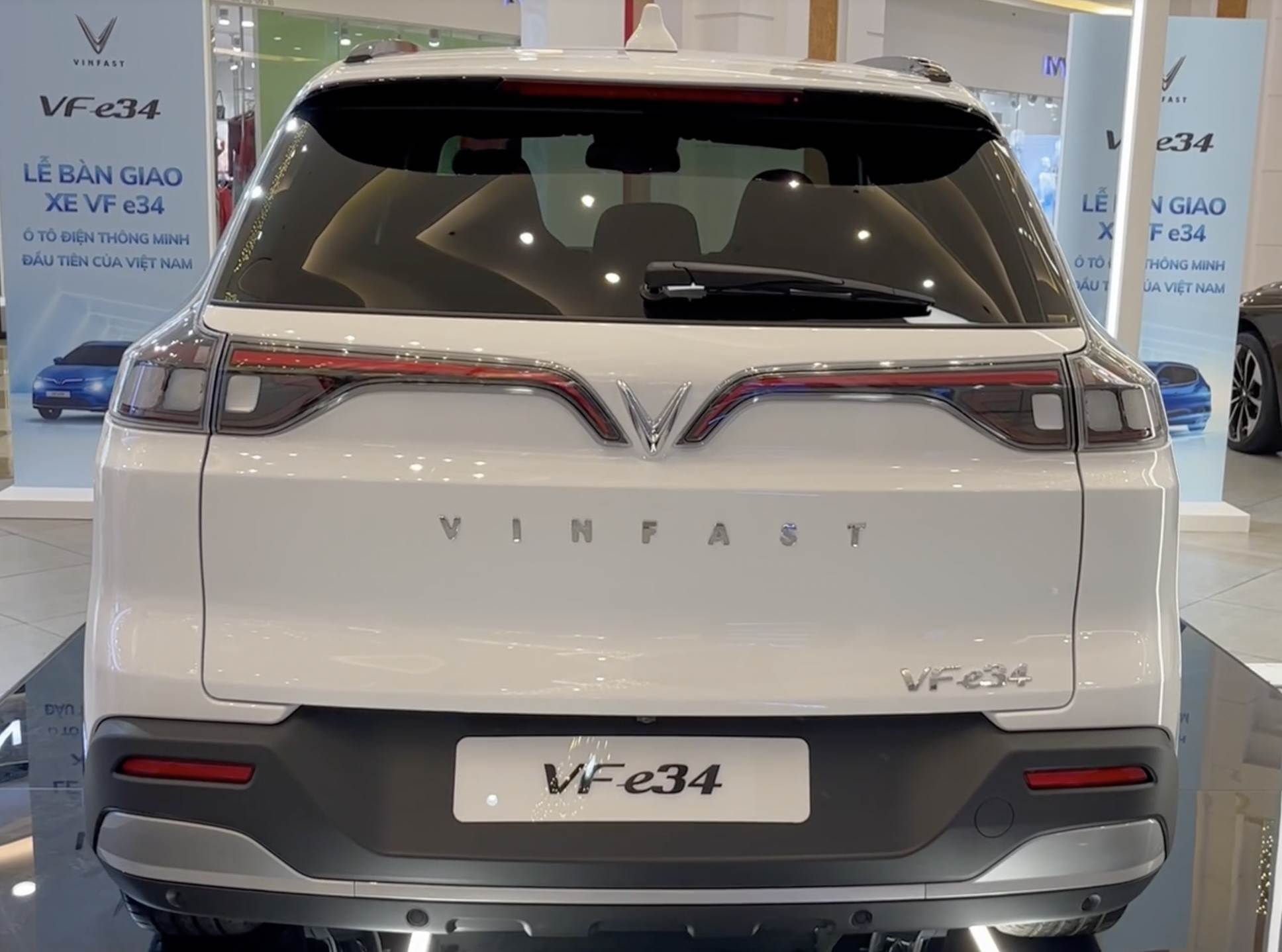
Rear view

In early 2025, VinFast renewed the e34 with the new Nerio Green nameplate, to configure it as a commercial, ride-sharing and taxi-oriented vehicle.

== Safety ==
ASEAN NCAP test results Vinfast VF e34 (2022)
Test	Points
Overall:	4 /5 stars
Adult occupant:	35.92
Child occupant:	17.71
Safety assist:	12.86
Motorcyclist Safety:	12.50
