= VinFast =

Vietnamese automotive company

VinFast Auto Ltd.

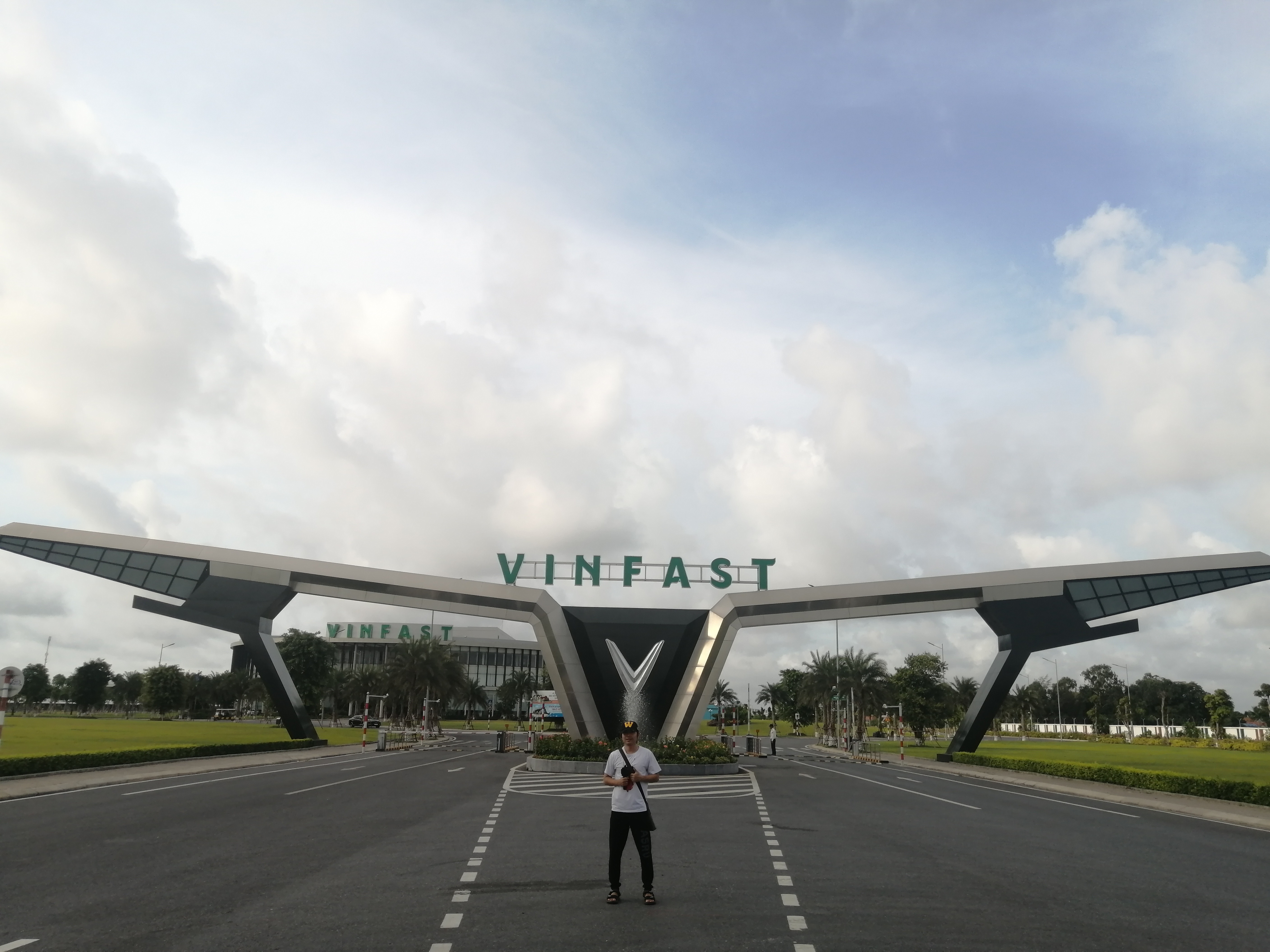
- VinFast’s factory gate
- Type: Public
- Traded as: Nasdaq: VFS
- Industry: Automotive
- Founded: June 2017; 9 years ago
- Founder: Phạm Nhật Vượng
- Headquarters: Đình Vũ – Cát Hải Economic Zone, Haiphong, Vietnam
- Area served: Vietnam; Indonesia; Philippines; India; Middle East; Europe; North America
- Key people: Pham Nhat Quan Anh (Chairman & Chief Executive Officer); Nguyen Thị Lan Anh (CFO)
- Products: Automobiles; Motorcycles; Commercial vehicles
- Revenue: ▲US$1.150 billion (2023)
- Operating income: ▲US$−1.667 billion (2023)
- Net income: ▲US$−2.366 billion (2023)
- Total assets: ▲US$5.487 billion (2023)
- Number of employees: 13,953 (2023)
- Parent: Vingroup
- Website: vinfast.com

VinFast Auto Ltd. is a Vietnamese multinational automotive manufacturer established in 2017 in Hải Phòng, Vietnam, as a subsidiary of Vingroup, one of the largest private conglomerates in Vietnam, founded by billionaire Phạm Nhật Vượng. It is the first Vietnamese automaker to sell passenger cars internationally and to manufacture electric vehicles, including electric cars and electric scooters.

VinFast was created as part of Vingroup's entry into the automotive industry, framed around Vietnam's national industrialization ambitions and intended to become the country's first globally competitive car brand. Its first two models, the LUX A2.0 sedan and LUX SA2.0 SUV, were petrol vehicles based on BMW platforms and unveiled at the 2018 Paris Motor Show. In 2022, the company announced it would cease production of internal combustion engine vehicles and transition exclusively to electric vehicles.

The company's legal and financial headquarters are registered in Singapore, while its operational headquarters and primary manufacturing remain in Vietnam. VinFast went public on the Nasdaq exchange on 15 August 2023 through a merger with a special-purpose acquisition company (SPAC), briefly reaching a market valuation higher than several established global automakers before its share price fell sharply.

VinFast pursued an aggressive international expansion across North America, Europe, and Asia, but the effort was marked by significant setbacks, including the indefinite delay of a planned factory in the United States, the cancellation of its UK market entry, and the suspension of its expansion into Thailand. The company has reported persistent net losses since its founding, prompting Vingroup and Phạm Nhật Vượng to commit billions of dollars in additional financing to sustain operations. In May 2026, VinFast announced a major corporate restructuring under which it would divest its Vietnamese manufacturing operations in a deal valued at approximately US$530 million, transitioning toward an asset-light model while retaining its research and development, intellectual property, and international sales functions.

== History ==
=== Founding and early development (2017–2021) ===
VinFast was established in 2017 as the automotive subsidiary of Vingroup, Vietnam's largest private conglomerate, chaired by the country's first US-dollar billionaire, Phạm Nhật Vượng. Vingroup, which had built its fortune in real estate, retail, hospitality, and other sectors, entered the automotive industry with the stated intention of creating Vietnam's first domestically engineered car brand and becoming a global player. The venture was closely associated with Vietnam's broader industrialisation ambitions: successive government strategies had sought to develop a domestic automotive industry, but most foreign manufacturers had found it more efficient to import vehicles assembled in Thailand and Indonesia rather than invest in local production, leaving the sector underdeveloped. VinFast set targets of an annual capacity of 500,000 units and a 60% localisation ratio by 2025.

The project was also framed around national pride. VinFast deliberately held the ground-breaking ceremony for its Hai Phong complex on 2 September 2017, Vietnam's National Day, and the company stated that its name stands for the Vietnamese words Việt Nam, Phong cách (style), An toàn (safety), Sáng tạo (creativity), and Tiên phong (pioneer), explicitly tying the brand to the rise of a developing and prosperous Vietnam and appealing to Vietnamese consumers' pride in a national car.

VinFast broke ground in September 2017 on an 828-acre (3,350,000 m^{2}) facility in an industrial park on Cat Hai Island near Hai Phong. The factory includes a paint shop, press shop, assembly shop, and engine shop, and was built in 21 months.

During the launch of the first phase of development in 2018, the company reported an initial investment of US$1.5 billion to manufacture cars and electric motorbikes at a greenfield factory. VinFast sourced European design, engineering, and production technology partners. In July 2017 the company had posted 20 car design sketches online from four studios, Italdesign Giugiaro, Pininfarina, Torino Design, and Zagato, and invited the Vietnamese public to vote; over 60,000 votes were cast. The two winning designs, the LUX A2.0 sedan and LUX SA 2.0 SUV, were shown at the Paris Motor Show in autumn 2018.

In 2018, General Motors announced a partnership under which VinFast would have exclusive rights to distribute the Chevrolet brand in Vietnam and would take ownership of the existing GM Korea factory in Hanoi (VIDAMCO), which was then to produce a GM-licensed small car sold under the VinFast name. VinFast also signed contracts with Siemens Vietnam for technology to manufacture electric buses in Southeast Asia.

The company was to have been the title sponsor of the inaugural Vietnamese Grand Prix during the 2020 season; the race was cancelled due to the COVID-19 pandemic. In Q1 2020, VinFast was the fifth best-selling car brand in Vietnam. On 20 September 2020, the company announced a loss of VND 6.6 trillion ($284 million) in the first half of the year.

In December 2020, VinFast released preliminary images of a pickup truck in development following the purchase of the Lang Lang Proving Ground in Australia. The pickup concept was later shown as the VF Wild at CES 2024 but had not entered production as of 2026. In October 2021, VinFast announced the sale of the Lang Lang proving ground; it had not found a buyer as of 2026.

In February 2020, VinFast opened an engineering office in Port Melbourne, staffed by former Holden, Ford Australia, and Toyota Australia engineers, becoming the company's first overseas engineering facility. The office was temporarily closed in May 2021 due to the COVID-19 pandemic and did not subsequently reopen as a permanent operation.

On 27 July 2021, Vingroup announced that Michael Lohscheller, former CEO of Opel, had been appointed CEO of VinFast Global. He resigned five months later on 27 December 2021.

On 25 December 2021, VinFast delivered the first batch of 100 VF e34 electric crossovers to Vietnamese customers at its Hai Phong facility, marking Vietnam's first domestically manufactured and sold electric vehicle.

=== Move to Singapore and Nasdaq listing (2022–2023) ===
VinFast announced in April 2022 that it planned an initial public offering (IPO) through a Singapore-based holding company, and simultaneously announced it would move its legal and financial headquarters to Singapore while Vietnam remained its operational base. The company stated that "We feel that Singapore is a jurisdiction that will give investors more confidence."

In July 2023, VinFast announced a merger with a special-purpose acquisition company (SPAC) operated by Black Spade Capital, valued at $23 billion. The transaction was completed on 14 August 2023, and VinFast began trading on Nasdaq on 15 August 2023 under the ticker symbol VFS. VinFast's share price surged dramatically on debut before falling sharply in subsequent weeks. Reuters reported that the company had made only 7,400 car sales in 2022, all in Vietnam, casting doubt on the implied valuation of tens of billions of dollars. VinFast set a sales target of 50,000 vehicles globally for 2023 but delivered approximately 35,000, missing the goal.

=== Financial difficulties and corporate restructuring (2024–2026) ===
In November 2024, Vingroup JSC pledged to loan VinFast as much as $1.38 billion to help the company break even by the end of 2026, with founder Phạm Nhật Vượng pledging an additional $1.97 billion personally. The break-even target was subsequently pushed back to after 2027, according to Reuters.

In May 2026, VinFast filed with the U.S. Securities and Exchange Commission a proposed corporate restructuring under which it would divest its Vietnamese manufacturing operations. Under the plan, VinFast's current Vietnamese manufacturing entity, VinFast Trading and Production JSC (VFTP), would be separated from the Singapore-registered holding company and sold to a buyer group led by Future Investment Research and Development JSC, which includes founder Pham Nhat Vuong, in a deal valued at approximately VND 13.3 trillion (US$530 million). The transaction would transfer approximately VND 182 trillion ($6.9 billion) in debt and obligations to VFTP, leaving VinFast Auto Ltd. effectively debt-free. A newly created entity, VinFast Vietnam JSC (VFVN), would retain global research and development, intellectual property, and sales operations, while VFTP would continue producing VinFast-branded vehicles under a cost-plus manufacturing agreement. The company described the restructuring as a move toward an "asset-light" model. Manufacturing facilities in India and Indonesia were stated to be unaffected. Completion was expected in the third quarter of 2026, subject to shareholder, creditor, and regulatory approvals.

=== Sales ===
Vinfast global car sales
Year	Q1	Q2	Q3	Q4	Total
2023			10,027	13,513	34,855
2024	9,689	13,712	21,912	53,139	97,399
2025	36,330	35,837	38,195	86,557	196,919
2026	58,577	70,085	82,580		

Vinfast global motorcycle sales
Year	Q1	Q2	Q3	Q4	Total
2023			28,220	24,309	72,468
2024				31,170	70,977
2025	44,904	69,580	120,052	171,962	406,498
2026	143,136	286,039	284,831		

== Overseas operations ==
=== North America ===
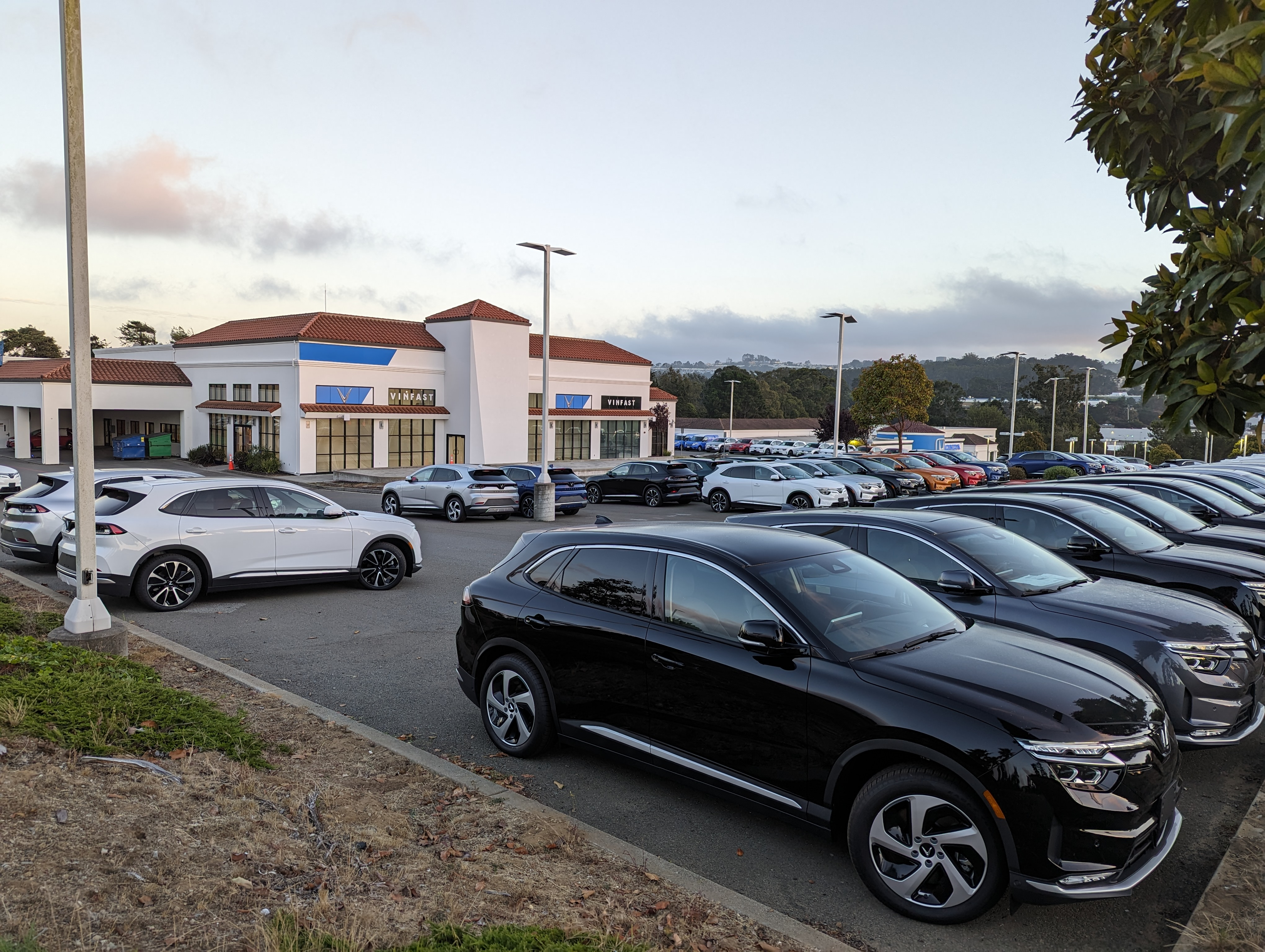
A VinFast dealership in Colma, California, United States

On 29 March 2022, VinFast announced it would build its first North American manufacturing plant in Chatham County, North Carolina, with a planned investment of $4 billion, annual production capacity of 150,000 vehicles, and a stated goal of creating 7,500 jobs. Ground was broken at the Moncure site in July 2023. The factory was originally targeted for completion in July 2024 but was delayed first to 2025 and then to 2028, as VinFast revised its site plans and struggled to attract buyers. Chatham County noted VinFast had twice revised the size of the factory's general assembly building, and no significant vertical construction had taken place as of mid-2024. The employment commitments remained unfulfilled as of 2026.

VinFast began selling the VF 8 in California in late 2022, initially under a direct-to-consumer model. Early reviews from automotive publications were mixed, with critics noting limited range, software issues, and pricing above comparable established rivals. In late 2023 the company pivoted to a franchised dealer model while retaining 15 company-owned California showrooms. By April 2025, VinFast announced the closure of all 15 California direct-to-consumer stores, leaving a single franchised dealership to cover the state. US vehicle registrations fell 57% through October 2025 compared with the same period the year prior. By December 2025, VinFast operated fewer than 22 US dealerships, far short of its original target of 125 by the end of 2024, with some locations reported to have no vehicles in stock. Chairwoman Lê Thị Thu Thủy told Automotive News that the company did not intend to open more US dealerships until the market stabilised.

VinFast launched in Canada in November 2022, opening its first showroom at Yorkdale Shopping Centre in Toronto, followed by locations in Vancouver, Laval, Quebec, and several other cities. The expansion fell far short of its target of over 30 corporate-owned stores. By May 2025, VinFast closed five of its ten Canadian locations, including all three of its mall-format boutique stores in Vancouver, Toronto, and Laval. At Vingroup's shareholders meeting in 2025, founder Phạm Nhật Vượng confirmed that VinFast would "temporarily pause its expansion plans into the US, Canada and Europe due to high logistics costs." VinFast Canada launched the Certified Pre-Owned (CPO) program

=== Europe ===
On 31 July 2018, VinFast GmbH was established in Frankfurt, Germany, as an early overseas presence handling parts distribution. VinFast began selling vehicles in France, Germany, and the Netherlands from 2022 using a direct-to-consumer model. The company also established plans to enter the United Kingdom, hiring former Polestar and Genesis UK executive Andrew Pilkington to set up a VinFast UK sales and marketing entity. By autumn 2024, VinFast postponed and subsequently cancelled its UK market entry entirely, closing VinFast UK with the majority of its sales staff made redundant.

In early 2025, VinFast closed all its European company-owned sales and service centres and transitioned to a franchised dealer model across France, Germany, and the Netherlands. In May 2025 the company signed its first official dealer partner in France and a second in Germany, selling the VF 6 and VF 8 models through the new network.

=== Southeast Asia ===
VinFast entered the Indonesian market in February 2024 with the VF e34, followed by the VF 5 in July 2024. Construction of a $200 million assembly plant in Subang, West Java, began in July 2024 with a planned annual capacity of 50,000 right-hand drive vehicles. The plant was inaugurated on 15 December 2025, completing construction in 17 months and establishing VinFast's first overseas production base in Southeast Asia. As of March 2025, VinFast operated 22 dealer stores in Indonesia.

VinFast announced its entry into Thailand at the Bangkok International Motor Show in March 2024, signing partnership agreements with 15 dealers and displaying the VF 5, VF e34, VF 6, VF 7, VF 8, and VF 9 in right-hand drive specification. By August 2024, just five months after the announcement, VinFast confirmed to Bloomberg that it was delaying its Thailand launch indefinitely, citing the ongoing price war in Southeast Asia's EV market and its inability to compete on price against established Chinese brands. Reports from Thai media indicated that VinFast Thailand had halted all local operations and that dealer partners were seeking compensation for their losses.

VinFast entered the Philippines in May 2024, signing agreements with its first four dealer partners at a brand launch event in Manila. Three dealerships opened in Manila in July 2024, and the VF 3, VF 5, VF 7, and VF 9 were launched between September and October 2024. At the 2025 Manila International Auto Show in April 2025, VinFast announced partnerships with six additional local distributors targeting over 60 new showrooms. As of March 2025, six dealer stores were in operation in the country.

=== India ===
In February 2024, VinFast broke ground on an integrated electric vehicle manufacturing facility in Thoothukudi (Tuticorin), Tamil Nadu, spanning 400 acres within a SIPCOT industrial estate, with a planned initial investment of US$500 million over five years and a total commitment of up to $2 billion. The plant has a design capacity of up to 150,000 vehicles per year and is expected to create approximately 3,000 to 3,500 local jobs. The facility was inaugurated on 4 August 2025 by Tamil Nadu Chief Minister M. K. Stalin, initially operating on a CKD assembly basis with a starting capacity of 50,000 units per year. Battery manufacturing had not commenced as of 2026.

In January 2025, VinFast presented the VF 6 and VF 7 at the Bharat Mobility Global Expo in New Delhi as its first models for the Indian market, both in right-hand drive configuration. VinFast also explored the possibility of a second manufacturing facility in Andhra Pradesh, for which an investment proposal of around ₹4,000 crore (US$480 million) was discussed, though no formal commitment had been announced as of 2026.

=== Central Asia ===
On December 2025, VinFast signed a strategic cooperation agreement, the Memorandum of Understanding (MOU) with Uzbekistan to enable the expansion of the company's vehicle brand to the region.

On June 2026, VinFast broke ground with the first entrance to Kazakhstan, with the first phase to be implemented in Almaty.

== Etymology ==
The name VinFast is an abbreviation of Vietnamese words:

- Việt Nam (Vietnam)
- Phong cách (Style, spelled Ph as F)
- An toàn (Safety)
- Sáng tạo (Creativity)
- Tiên phong (Pioneer)

== Corporate leadership ==
=== Current ===
- Lê Thị Thu Thủy (Chairwoman since 2017)
- Phạm Nhật Vượng (Chief Executive Officer since January 2024)

=== Previous CEO ===
- James DeLuca (2017–2021)
- Michael Lohscheller (2021)
- Lê Thị Thu Thủy (2021–2024)

== Products ==
=== Automobiles ===
In March 2026, VinFast restructured its vehicle lineup into three distinct brand lines: Lac Hong for ultra-luxury vehicles; VF for mass-market passenger electric vehicles; and Green for commercial and ride-hailing mobility products.

==== Internal combustion engine vehicles ====
VinFast announced its first two models, the LUX A2.0 and the LUX SA2.0, at the 2018 Paris Motor Show. Both models were based on previous-generation BMW platforms with chassis modifications and were powered under licence by the BMW N20 turbocharged petrol engine. Production of both models started in 2019 and ended in 2022, when VinFast announced it would cease production of all internal combustion engine vehicles and focus exclusively on battery electric vehicles.

Internal combustion engine vehicles
Image	Name	Introduced	Discontinued	Vehicle description
	LUX A2.0	2019	2022	Executive sedan, based on the F10 BMW 5 Series.
	LUX SA2.0	2019	2022	Mid-size luxury crossover, based on the F15 BMW X5.
	President	2019	2022	V8 variant of the LUX SA2.0 with additional luxury features.
	Fadil	2019	2022	City car produced under licence from General Motors as a rebadged variant of the Opel Karl.

==== VF and Green range (battery electric passenger vehicles) ====
VF and Green range
Model			Current generation			Vehicle description
Image	Name	Introduction (cal. year)	Introduction	Update (facelift)	Markets	Vehicle description
	VF 2 Minio Green	2025	2025	—	Vietnam	A-segment city car with two doors and four seats.
	VF e34 Nerio Green	2021	2021	—	Vietnam, Indonesia	B-segment subcompact crossover SUV. VinFast's first electric vehicle, launched in Vietnam in December 2021.
	VF 3	2024	2024	—	Vietnam, Indonesia, Philippines	A-segment two-door mini SUV with seating for four.
	VF 5 Herio Green	2023	2023	2026	Vietnam, Indonesia, Philippines	A-segment crossover city car.
	VF 6	2024	2024	—	Vietnam, Indonesia, Europe, India	B-segment subcompact crossover SUV for the global market.
	VF 7	2024	2024	—	Vietnam, Indonesia, Philippines, India	C-segment compact crossover SUV.
	VF MPV 7 Limo Green	2025	2025	—	Vietnam, Indonesia, Philippines, India	Mid-size MPV.
	VF 8	2022	2026	—	Vietnam, North America, Europe, Middle East	D-segment mid-size crossover SUV for the global market. VinFast's first model sold in the United States. Formerly known as the VF32 and VF e35.
	VF 9	2022	2022	—	Vietnam, North America	E-segment full-size crossover SUV. Formerly known as the VF33 and VF e36.
	VF Wild	2026	2026	—	Vietnam	Mid-size pickup truck.

==== Lac Hong range (ultra-luxury) ====
The Lac Hong brand line was established in 2025 as VinFast's ultra-luxury marque. The name references the Lạc Hồng legend from Vietnamese mythology. The range sits above the mainstream VF lineup and is produced in significantly lower volumes.

Lac Hong range
Image	Name	Introduced	Launched	Vehicle description
	Lac Hong 900 LX	2025	2025 (limited)	Full-size luxury electric SUV developed jointly with Canadian armoured vehicle manufacturer INKAS, built on the VF 9 platform and certified to VPAM VR ballistic and blast protection standards. A limited fleet was delivered to Vietnam's Ministry of Foreign Affairs in September 2025 to coincide with Vietnam's 80th National Day.
	Lac Hong 900S	2026	2027 (planned)	Full-size luxury electric sedan. Features a tri-motor powertrain producing 460 kW (625 hp), with one motor at the front axle and two at the rear. Rear-passenger focused interior with executive seating and a partition screen option.
	Lac Hong 800S	2026	2027 (planned)	Full-size luxury electric SUV. Shares the tri-motor 460 kW (625 hp) powertrain with the 900S.

==== Concepts ====
The VF Wild is a mid-size electric pickup truck concept unveiled at CES 2024 in Las Vegas in January 2024. Developed in collaboration with Australian design studio GoMotiv, the concept features suicide rear doors, a midgate expandable cargo bed, and all-wheel-drive assumed from its powertrain layout. VinFast had not confirmed production specifications, pricing, or a firm production start date as of May 2026; VinFast's Chairwoman stated the model could be ready for production "as early as 2026" at the time of its reveal, though no production announcement had followed. The production model was unveiled on 19 September 2026, and went on sale in Vietnam on 25 September 2026.

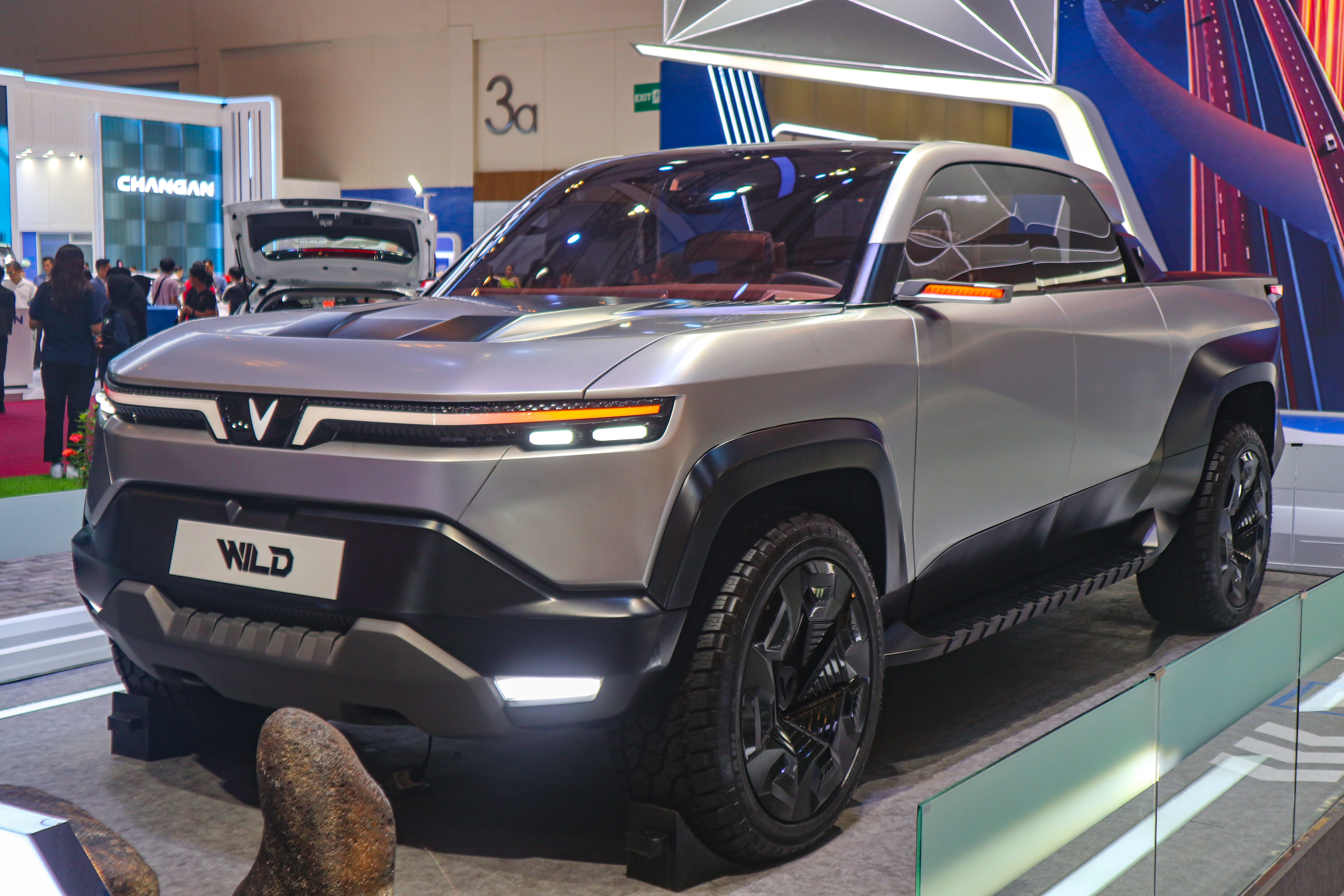
VF Wild concept at the Gaikindo Jakarta Auto Week 2025

=== Electric scooters ===
VinFast produces a range of electric scooters and motorcycles for the Vietnamese and export markets. It has signed agreements with state-owned petrol distributor PV Oil for charging stations at existing service stations.

The VinFast Klara, VinFast's first electric scooter, launched in November 2018 with a range of 80 kilometres (50 mi) and a maximum speed of 50 kilometres per hour (31 mph). Components were supplied by Bosch Vietnam and the batteries by a joint venture with LG Chem. The Klara is offered in two versions with lead-acid and lithium-ion batteries respectively, and includes 3G and Bluetooth connectivity for remote locking and tracking.

Other models in the electric scooter range include the Ludo, Impes, Klara S, Theon, Feliz, Tempest, Vento, and Evo200.

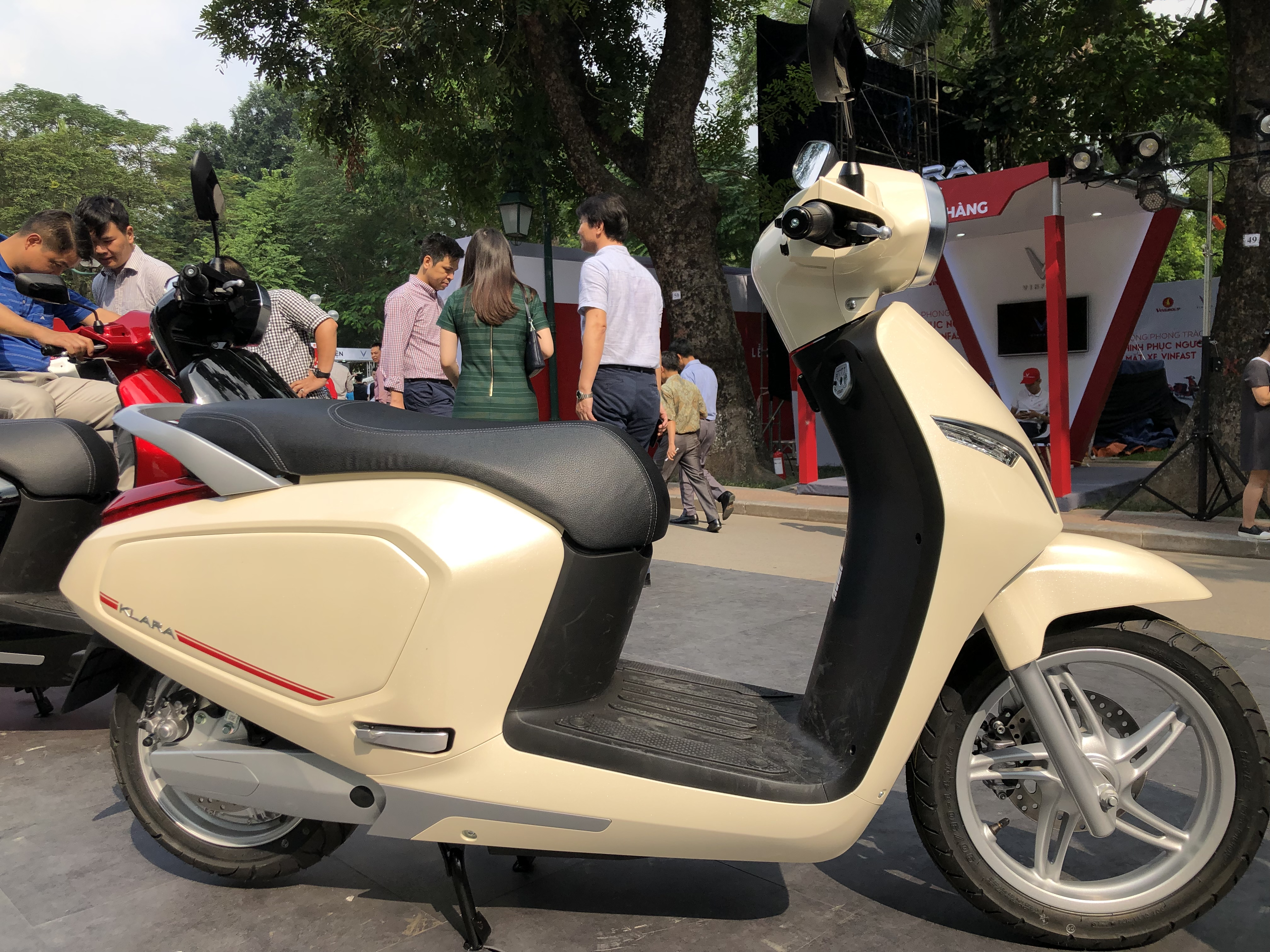
VinFast Klara

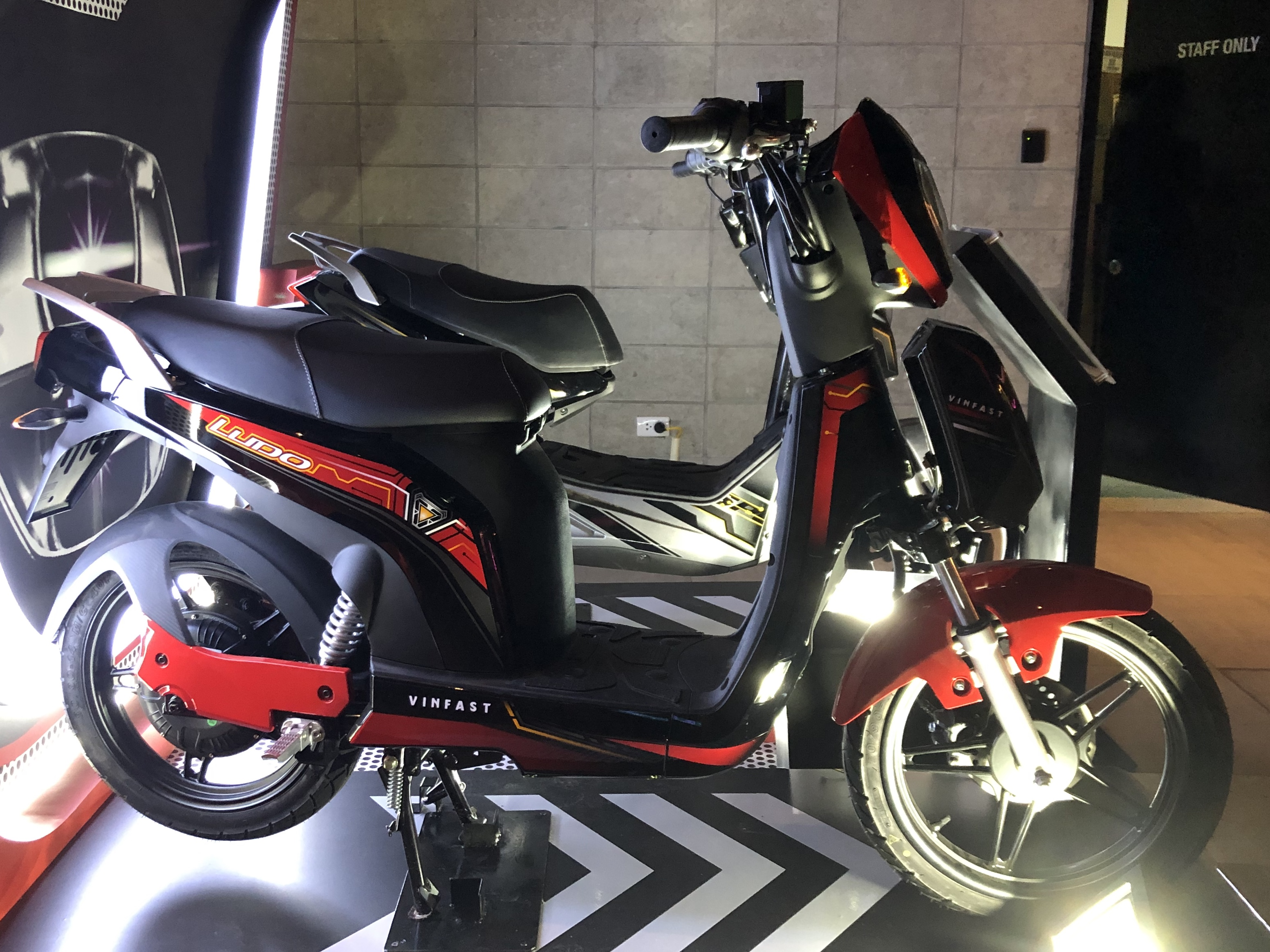
VinFast Ludo

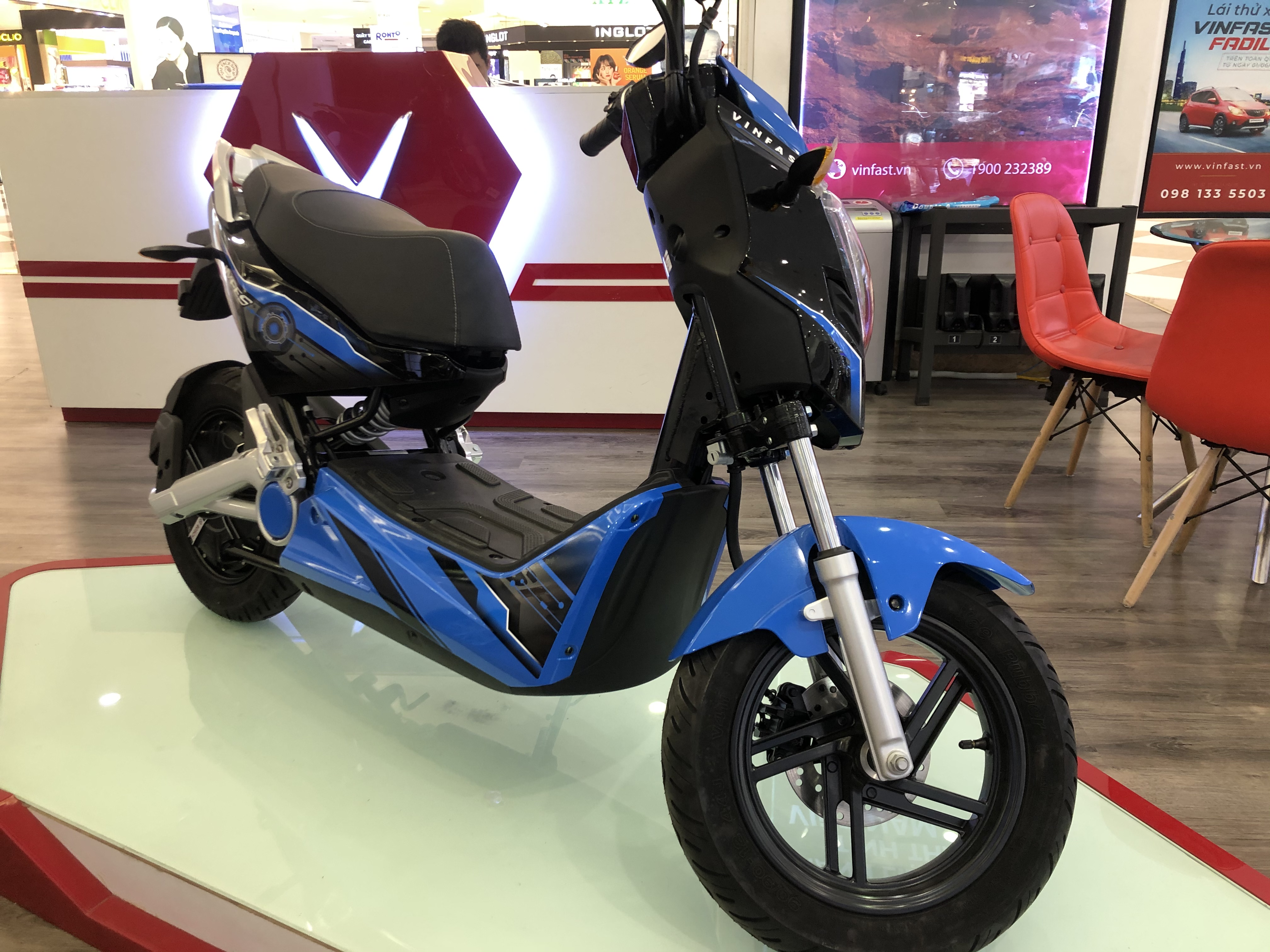
VinFast Impes

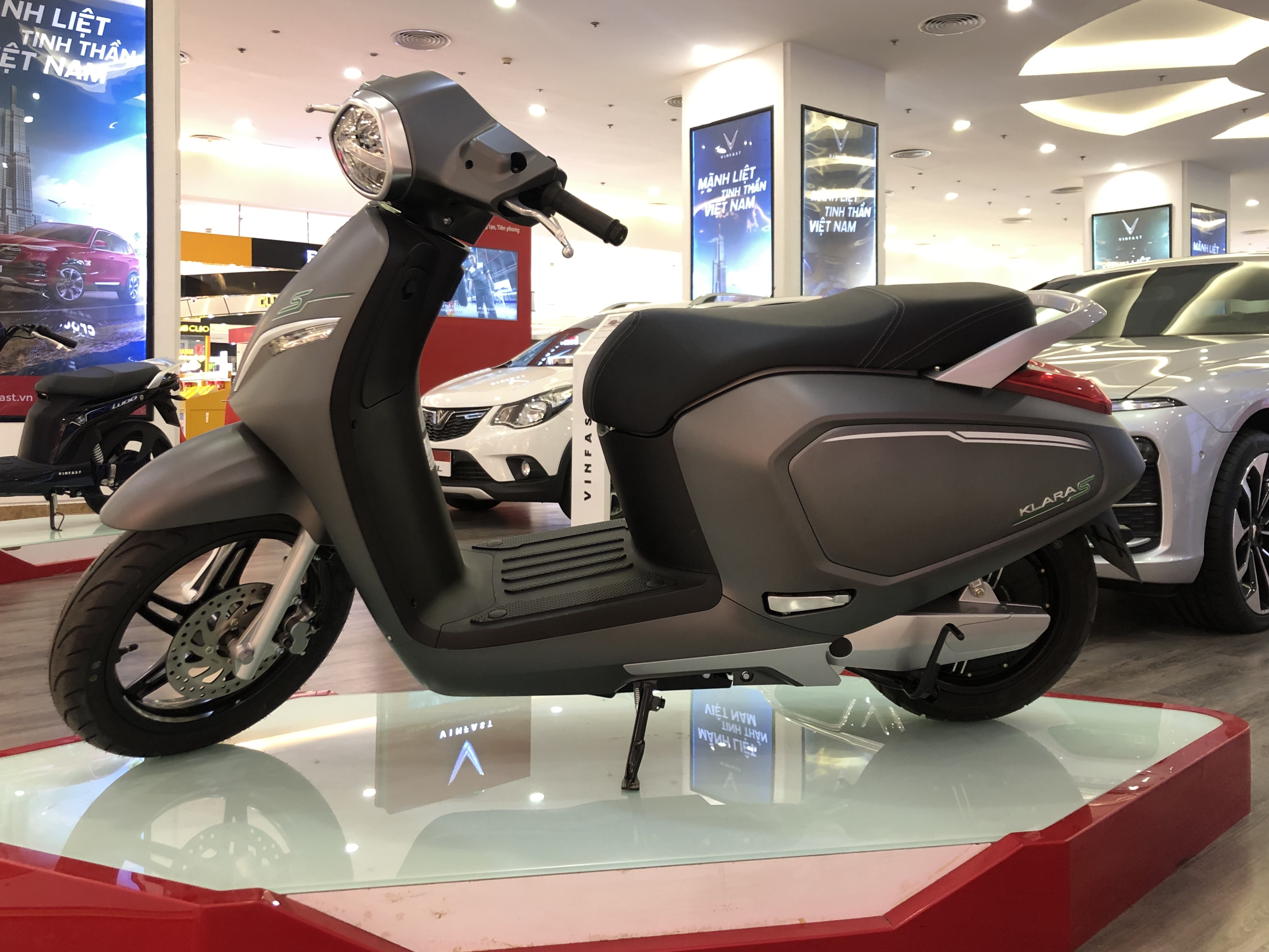
VinFast Klara S

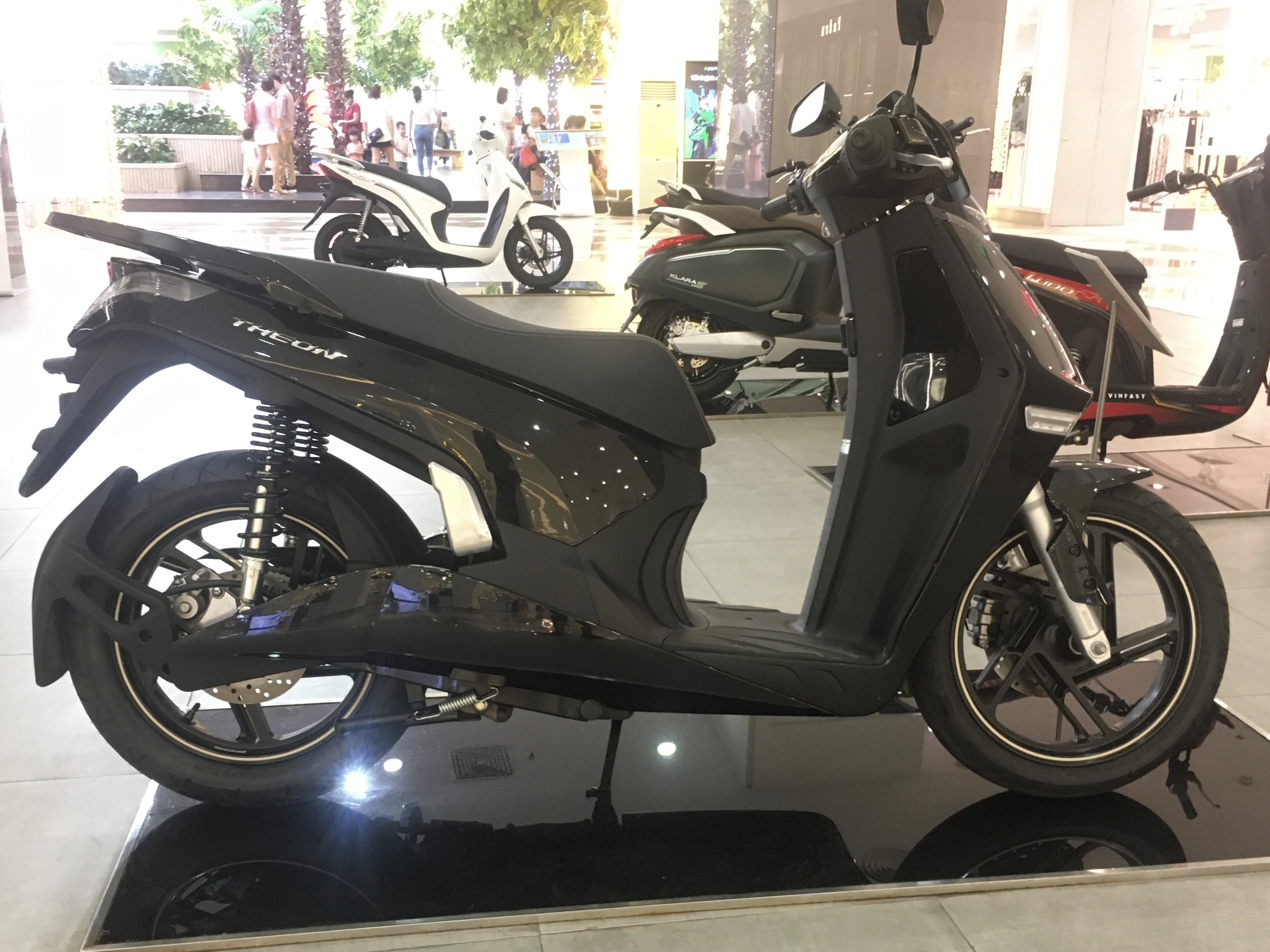
VinFast Theon

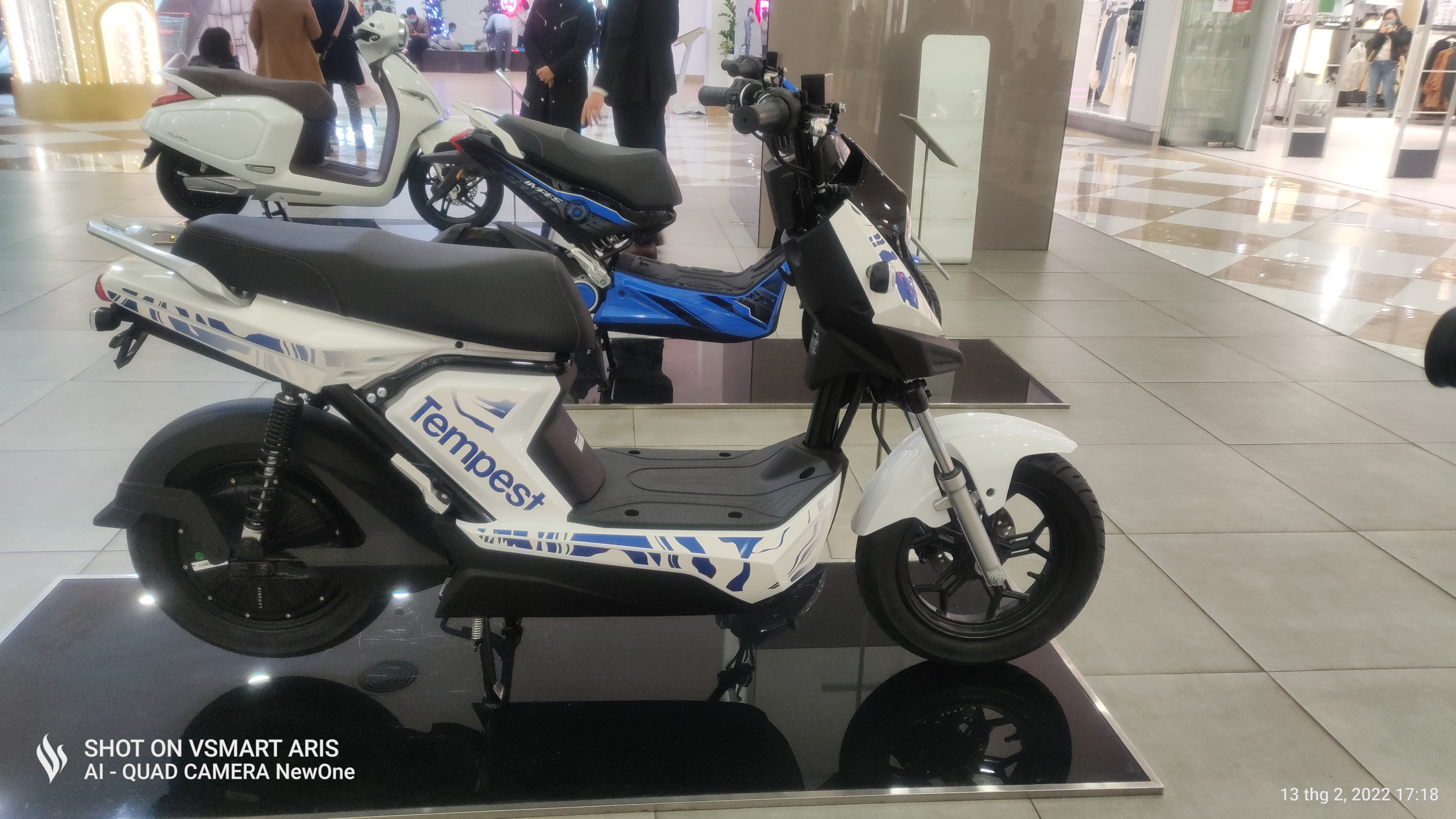
VinFast Tempest

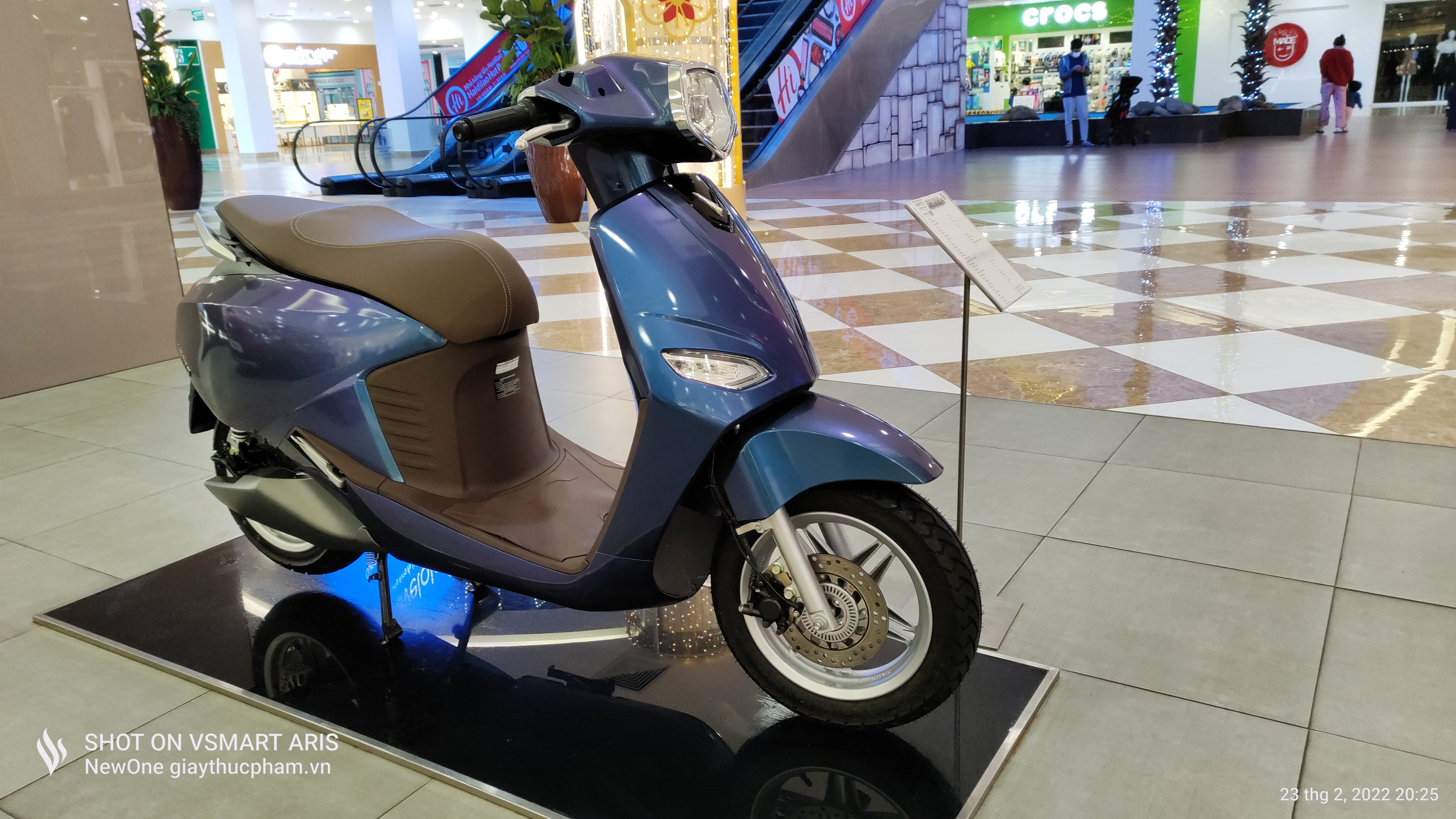
VinFast Vento

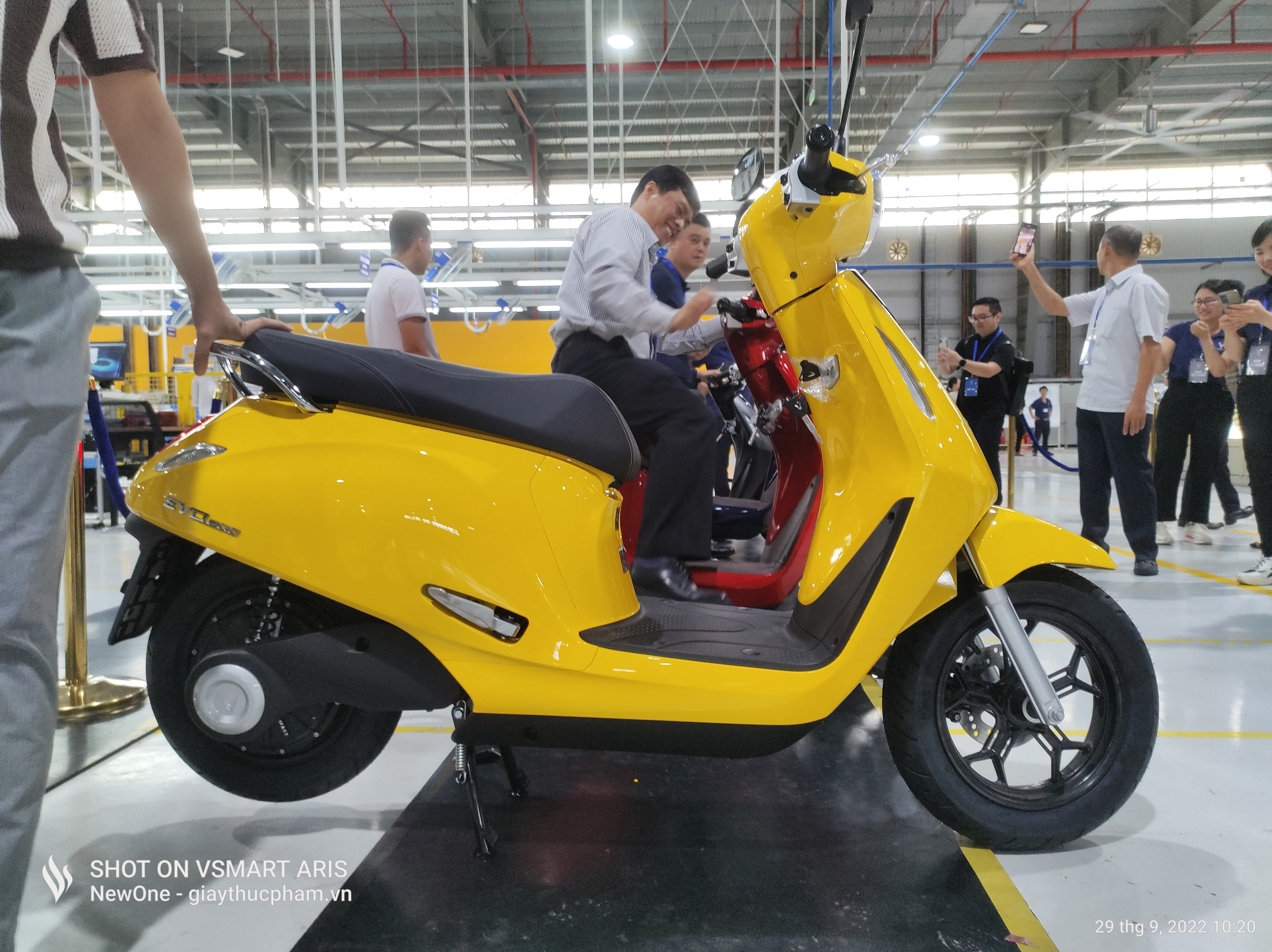
VinFast Evo200

=== Electric transit buses ===
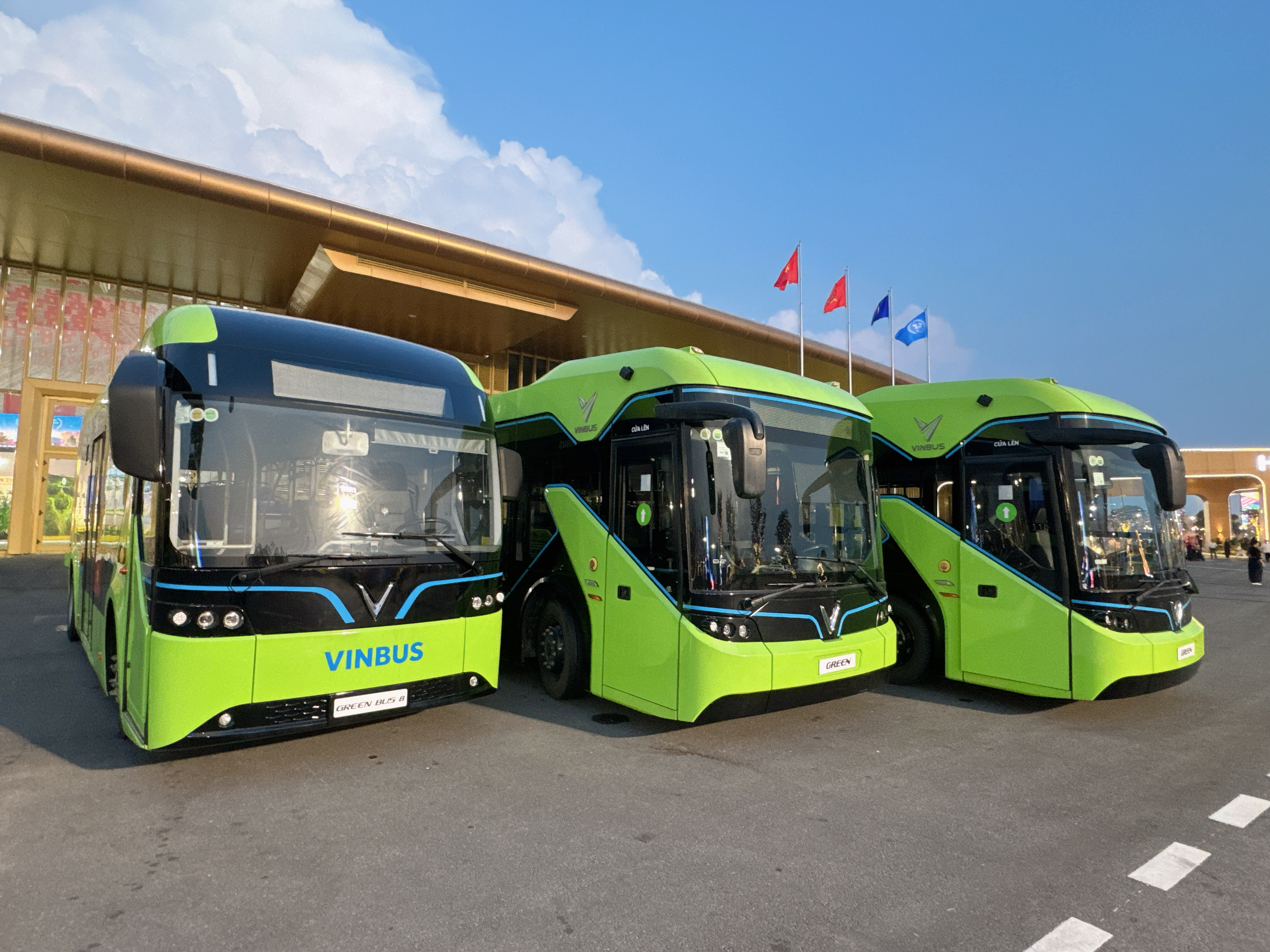
VinBus-branded models.

VinFast produces low-floor electric city buses ranging from 6 to 12 metres in length. The 8-metre (EB8) and 12-metre (EB12) models have been certified to European standards. VinFast displayed the EB8 and EB12 at Busworld Europe 2025, marking its first entry into the European bus market. The EB10 model has been in operation in Vietnamese cities since 2021 under the VinBus brand.

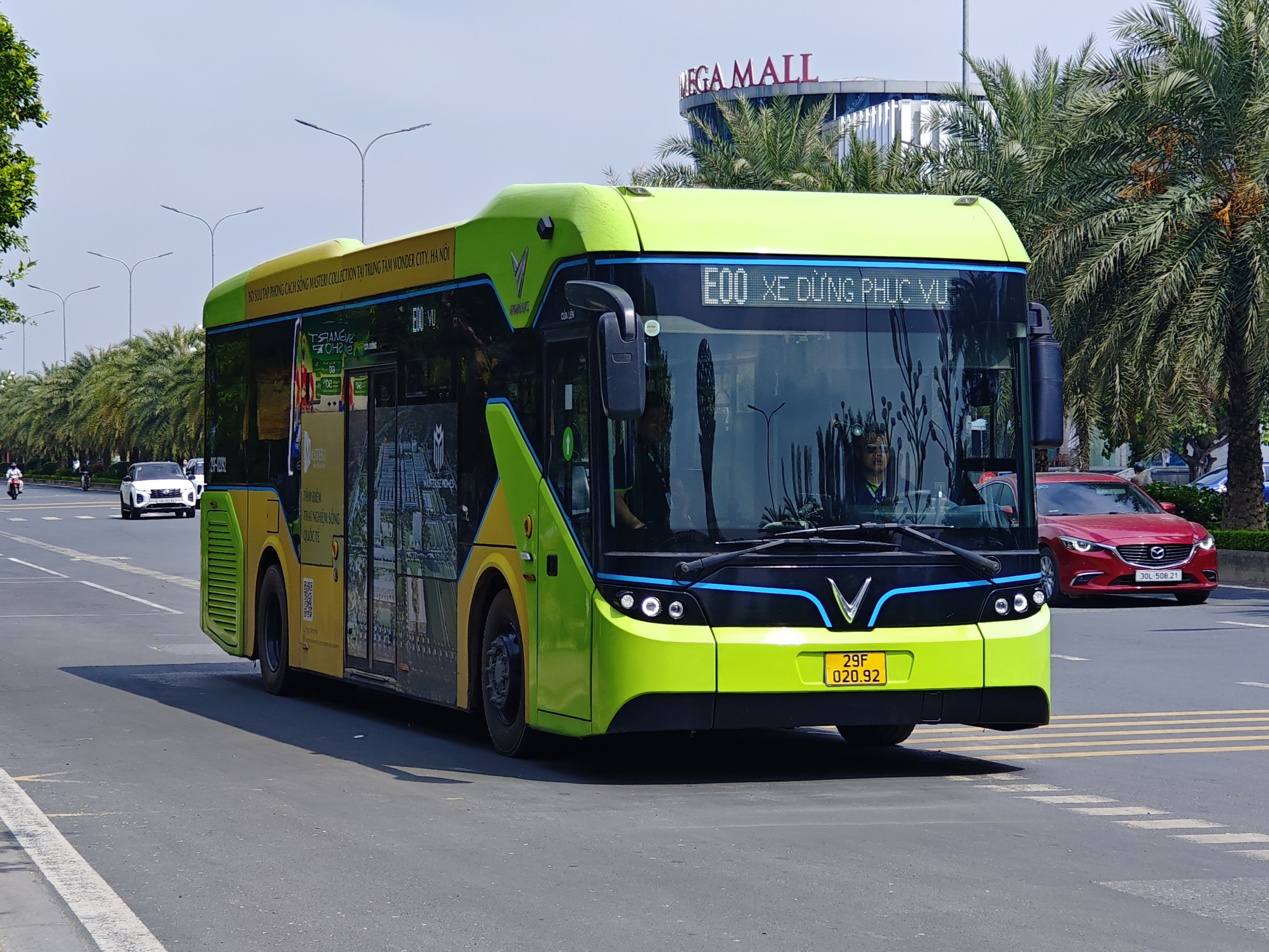
VinFast EB10

== Facilities ==
VinFast operates a 335 hectares (1.29 sq mi) greenfield factory at Cat Hai Island, Hai Phong. The factory produces cars and motorbikes and parts for both of them. In 2017, VinFast also acquired GM Vietnam's Hanoi factory (VIDAMCO).

In September 2020, VinFast purchased the Lang Lang Proving Ground in Australia from General Motors. VinFast purchased the former Holden proving ground for $30 million and settled on the purchase on 2 November. In October 2021, VinFast disbanded its local engineering operations and put the Lang Lang Proving Ground test track up for sale.

VinFast will build a plant in Indonesia, targeting production in 2025 with an output of 30,000 to 50,000 units each year.

== In the media ==
In August 2023, in tandem with its Nasdaq listing, VinFast launched an advertising campaign for the VF 8 featuring Joey Lawrence, reviving his catchphrase "Whoa!" from the TV series Blossom. The campaign amassed a million views on YouTube within a week and was produced by Anaheim Studios. A second installment of the campaign, again starring Lawrence, was released in December 2023.

== Controversy and reception ==
In May 2021, VinFast reported one of its customers, Tran Van Hoang, a Vietnamese YouTuber, to the police over comments that the customer made on his YouTube video about the quality of his VinFast Lux A2.0 car. VinFast claimed that the video contained "untrue content" that "affected the reputation" of the company to increase views and interactions for his YouTube channel. On the video, Hoang complained about faults in the tire pressure sensor, the windshield wipers, the wireless phone charger, and squeaking doors. Vinfast alleged that Hoang lied about the number of times he went to the dealership for repairs, though Hoang claims to have evidence to support his statements. Hoang claimed he hired lawyers and was ready to confront VinFast in the lawsuit. However, he suggested later, "The two sides should meet and share to have a common voice because the incident that happened was not expected by either side".

VinFast received The Rising Star award from Autobest in 2022 and named among world's 100 most influential companies in 2024 by Time.

In the US, the VinFast VF 8 has received negative reception after press cars became available to automotive journalists. A number of well-established and widely followed automotive journalists and car critics have given the VF8 poor reviews. In a May 2023 review, Motor Trend said the vehicle is "nowhere near ready for the customer deliveries" due to many software glitches. Car and Driver said the vehicle has "immediately obvious flaws" that would make it difficult for VinFast to find customers.

In Vietnam, on 15 May 2024, after VinFast opened deposits for VF3 cars, there were 27,649 orders after 66 hours, setting a new record in Vietnam.

On 21 May 2024, US regulators began an investigation into the crash of a VinFast VF 8 that resulted in the deaths of a family of four from Pleasanton, California. "The vehicle owner had complained about the performance of the SUV's automated steering, although it's not clear if that was a factor in the crash."

In December 2024, a chassis designer who worked on development of VinFast cars came public as a whistleblower, claiming that VinFast ignored his recommendations to redesign parts that suffered from premature failure during prototype testing. Reports indicate that engineers faced significant pressure to meet stringent deadlines, raising concerns about the safety and quality of VinFast vehicles. Allegations suggest that engineers were even locked in factories overnight to speed up production, potentially compromising vehicle safety.

== See also ==
- Vinaxuki
- StoreDot
