= VinFast VF 5 =

Vietnamese crossover city car

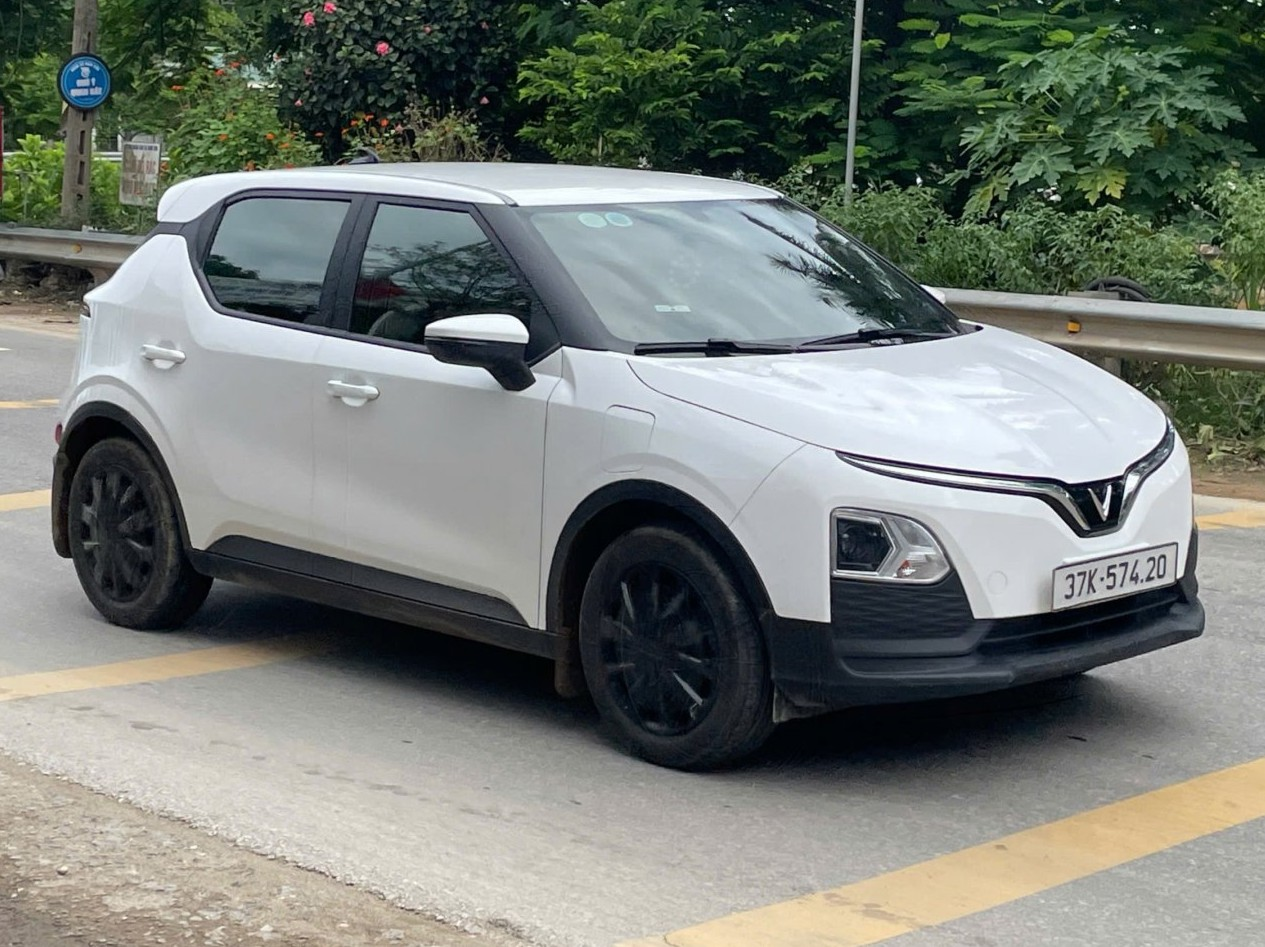

Overview
- Manufacturer: VinFast
- Also called: VinFast Herio Green
- Production: 2023–present
- Assembly: Vietnam: Cát Hải, Haiphong
- Designer: Pininfarina and Torino Design

Body and chassis
- Class: Crossover city car (A-segment)
- Body style: 5-door hatchback
- Layout: Front motor, front-wheel-drive

Powertrain
- Electric motor: 70 or 100 kW (94 or 134 hp) Permarnent Magnet Synchronous Motor
- Battery: 29.6 or 37.23 kWh LFP battery
- Range: 260–300 km (160–190 mi) (NEDC)

Dimensions
- Wheelbase: 2,513 mm (98.9 in)
- Length: 3,965 mm (156.1 in)
- Width: 1,720 mm (67.7 in)
- Height: 1,580 mm (62.2 in)

The VinFast VF 5, also known as VinFast Herio Green, is a battery electric crossover city car produced and marketed by VinFast since 2023. On January 6, 2022, the model was presented for the first time at the Consumer Electronics Show, and was shown in full at the 2022 Paris Motor Show.

== Overview ==
The VF 5 is an A-segment crossover city car forming the entry to the VinFast line-up. It was earlier known as the VinFast VF e32 during development.

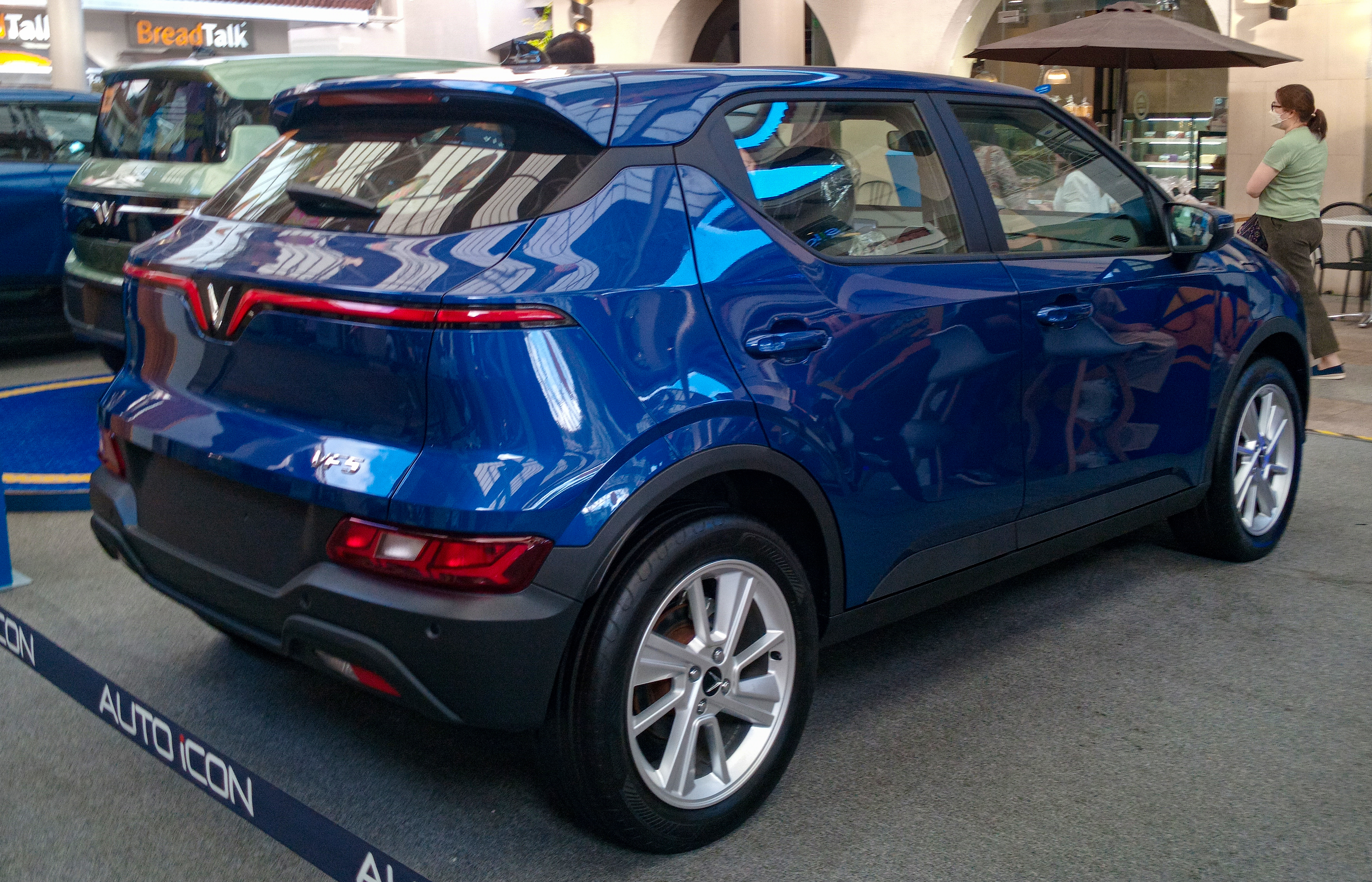
Rear view

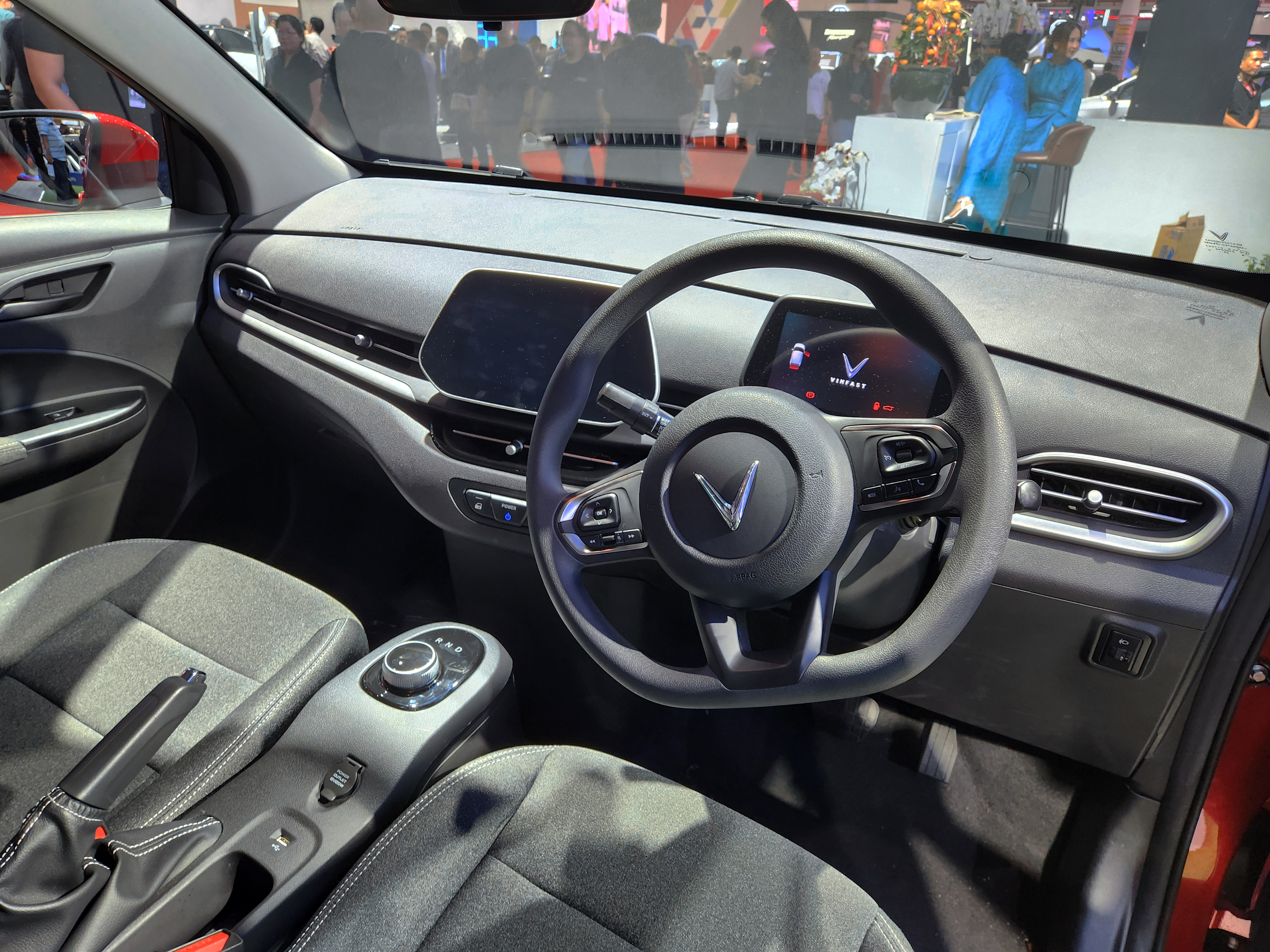
Interior

=== 2026 facelift ===
The facelift was unveiled on 17 November 2026.

== Sales ==
Year	Vietnam
2024	32,000
