= 2018 Paris Motor Show =

International auto show

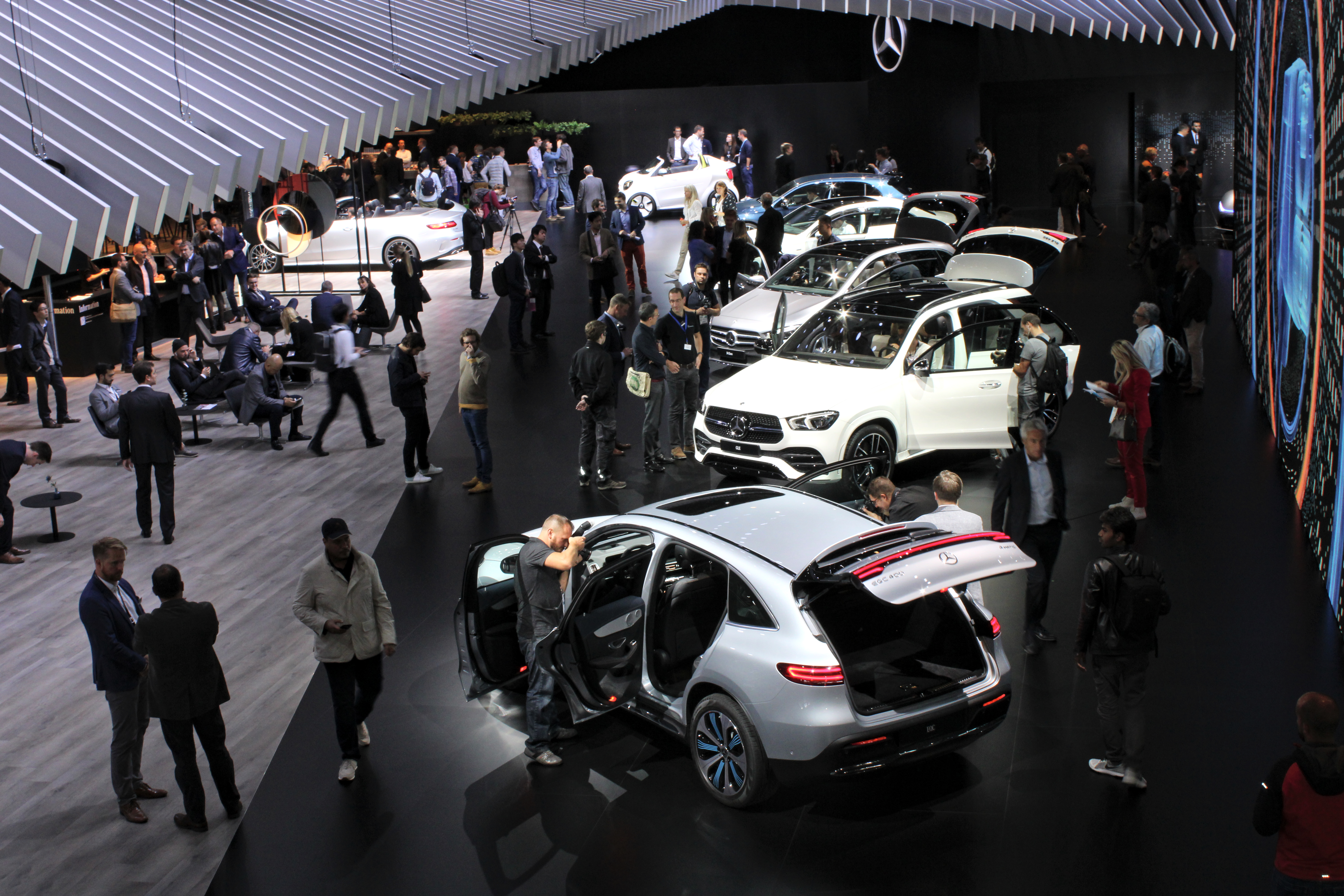
- Mercedes-Benz stand at the 2018 Paris Motor Show
- Genre: Auto show
- Begins: October 4, 2018
- Ends: October 14, 2018
- Venue: Paris Expo Porte de Versailles
- Location: Paris
- Country: France
- Previous event: 2016 Paris Motor Show
- Next event: 2022 Paris Motor Show

The 2018 Paris Motor Show took place from 4 to 14 October 2018. For the first time, it consisted of three shows dedicated to automobiles, motorcycles and new mobility.

== Introductions ==
=== Production cars ===
- Audi A1
- Audi E-tron EV
- Audi Q3
- Audi SQ2
- BMW 3 Series (G20)
- BMW X5 (G05)
- BMW Z4 (G29)
- DS 3 Crossback
- Ferrari Monza SP1/SP2
- Honda CR-V Hybrid
- Hyundai i30 Fastback N
- Hyundai i30 N Option
- Kia Ceed
- Kia Proceed
- Lexus RC (refresh)
- Mercedes-Benz GLE
- Mercedes-Benz EQC
- Mercedes-Benz B-Class
- Mercedes-AMG A35
- Peugeot 508 SW
- Peugeot 508 E-Tense
- Toyota Corolla Touring Sports (E210)
- Toyota Yaris GR Sport (European Debut)
- VinFast LUX A2.0 Saloon (European Debut)
- VinFast LUX SA2.0 SUV LUX (European Debut)
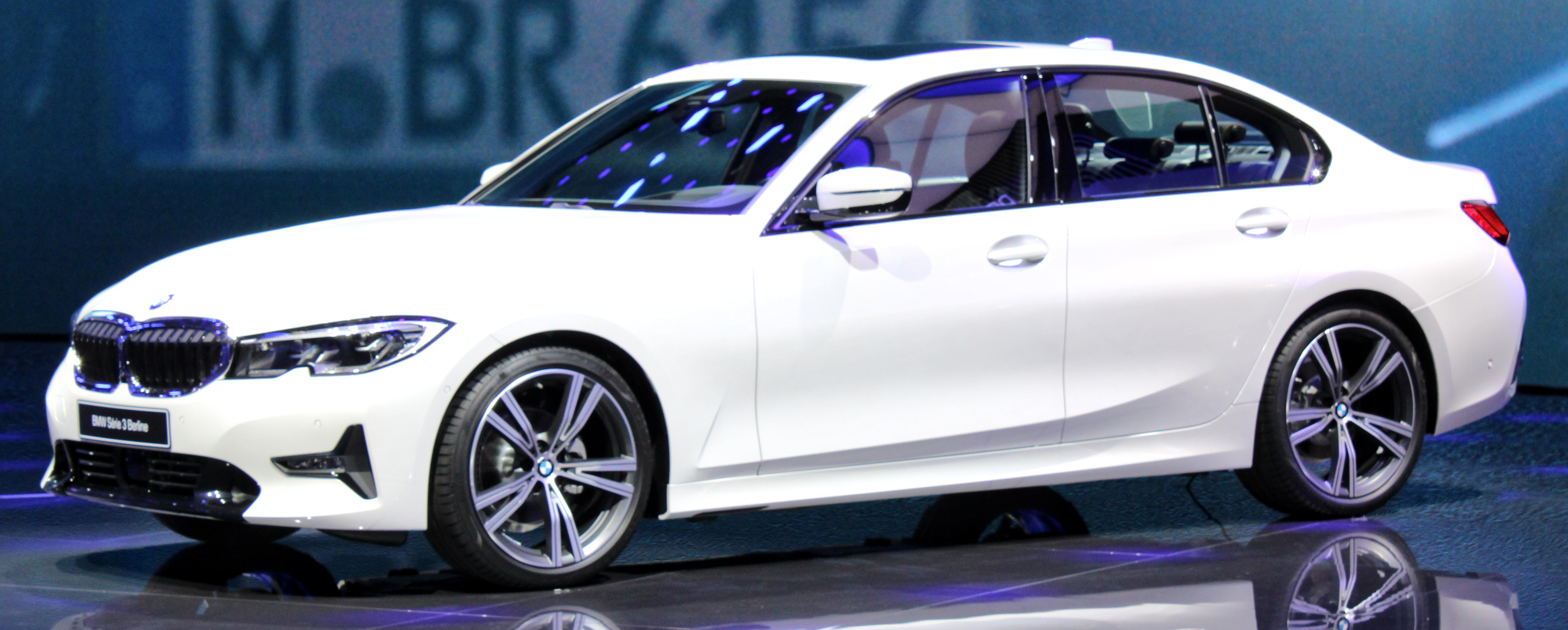
BMW 3 Series (G20)

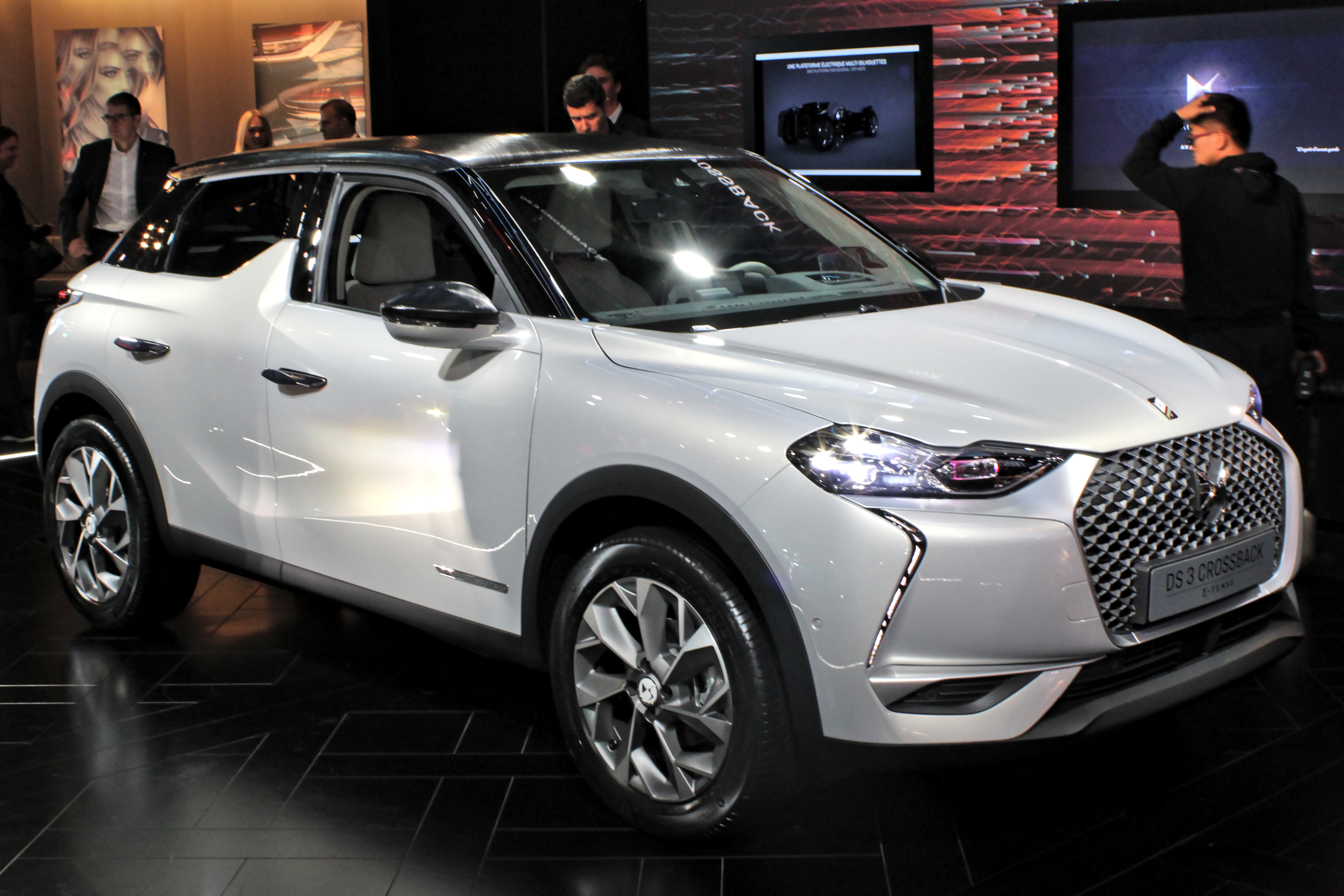
DS 3 Crossback

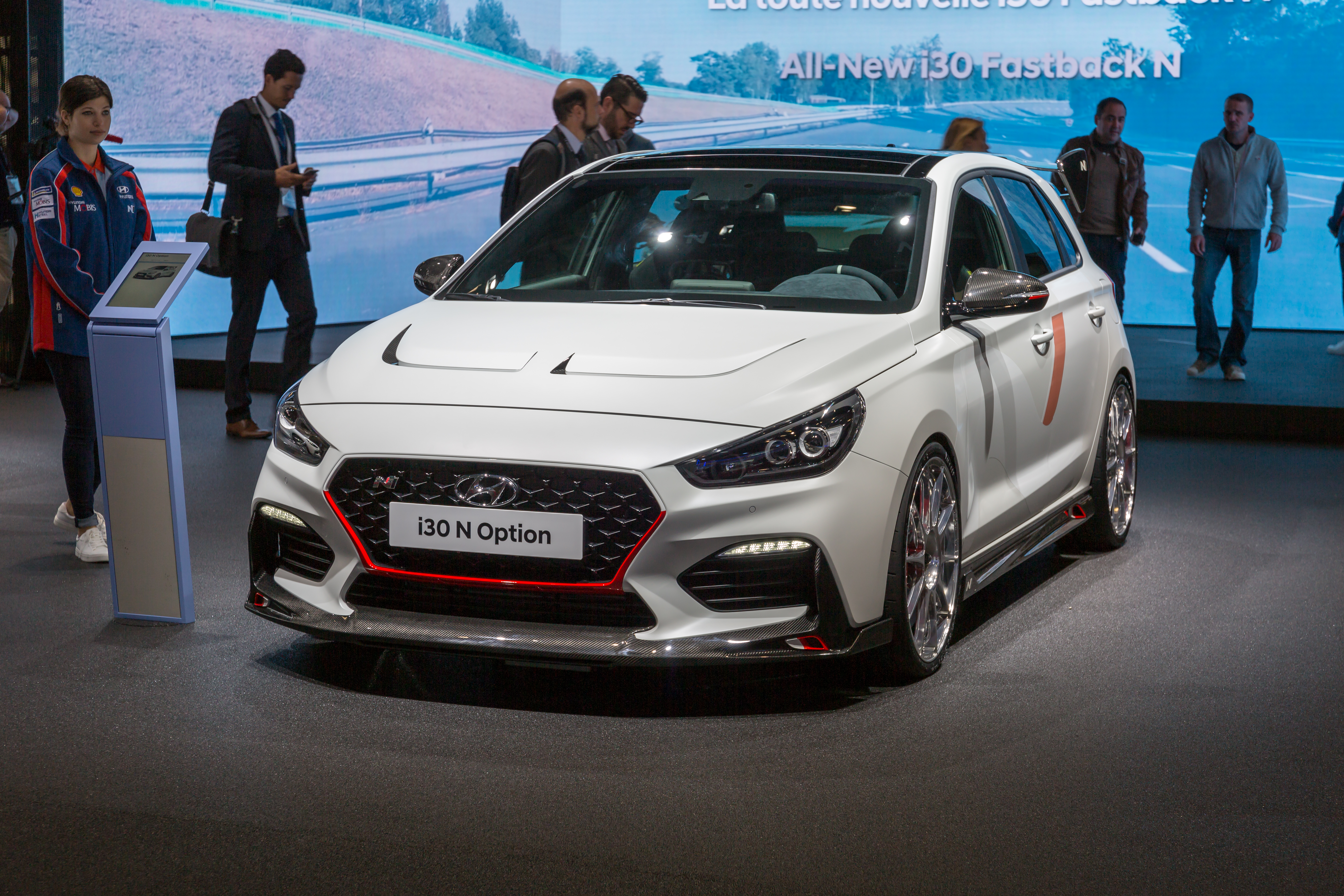
Hyundai i30 N Option

=== Concept cars ===
- Audi R8 LMS GT3 Evo
- Citroën C5 Aircross Hybrid Concept
- Peugeot e-Legend concept
- Renault EZ Ultimo

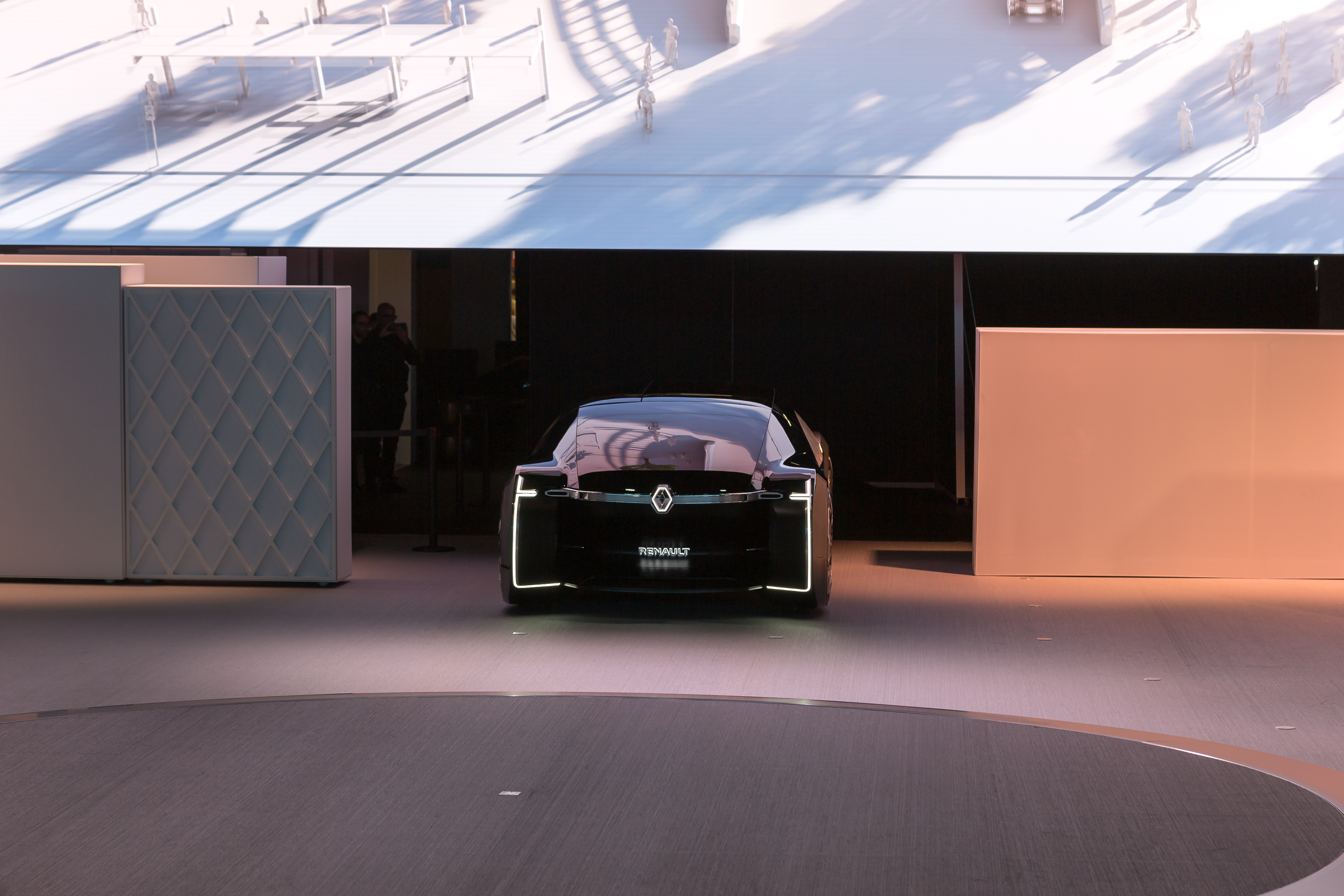
Renault EZ Ultimo concept

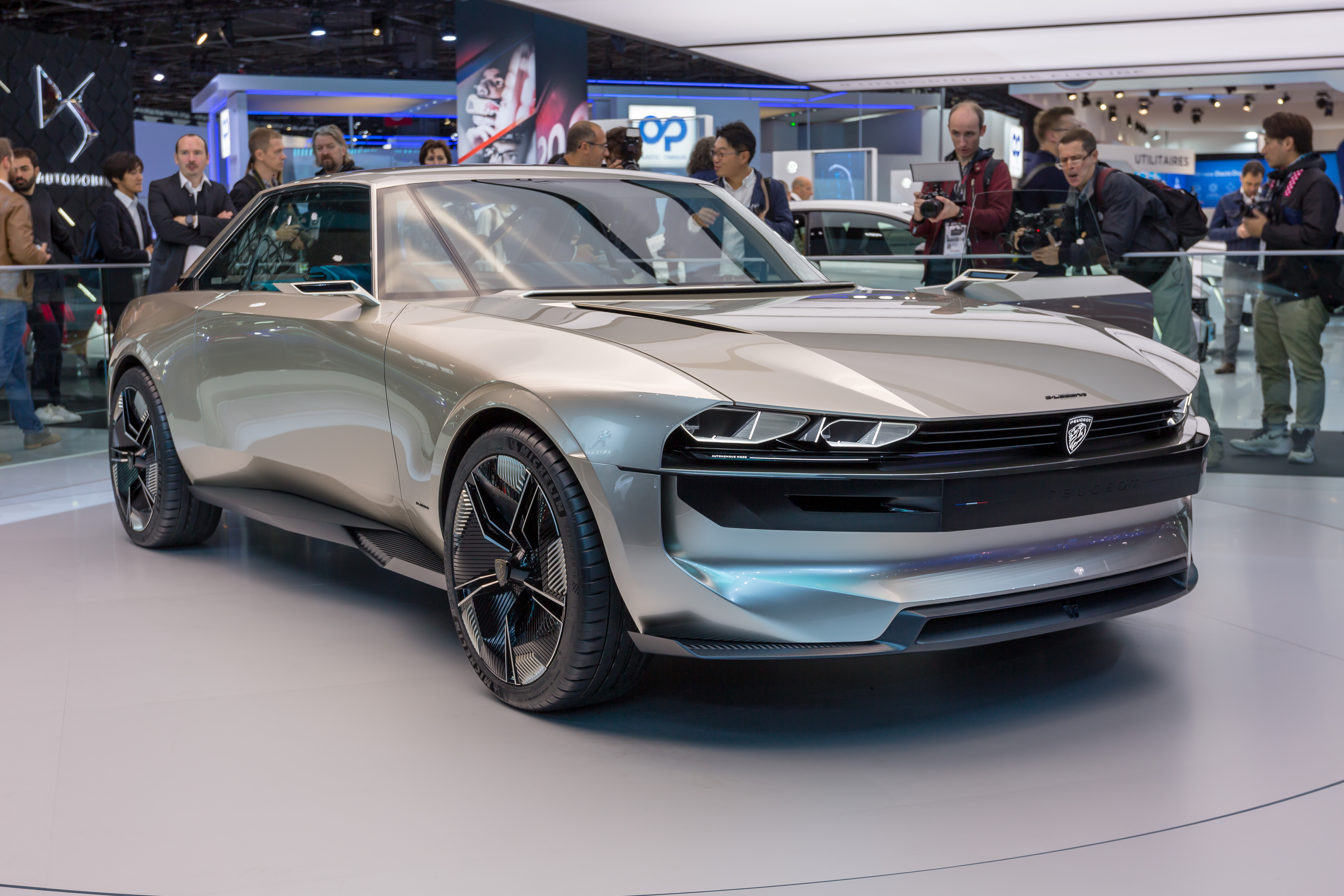
Peugeot e-Legend Concept

=== Motorsport cars ===
- Citroën C3 WRC (refresh)
- Hyundai i20 WRC (refresh)
- Hyundai i30 N TCR Touring Car (refresh)
- Peugeot 208 WRX FIA European Rallycross Championship
- Škoda Fabia R5 WRC-2
- Toyota Yaris WRC (refresh)

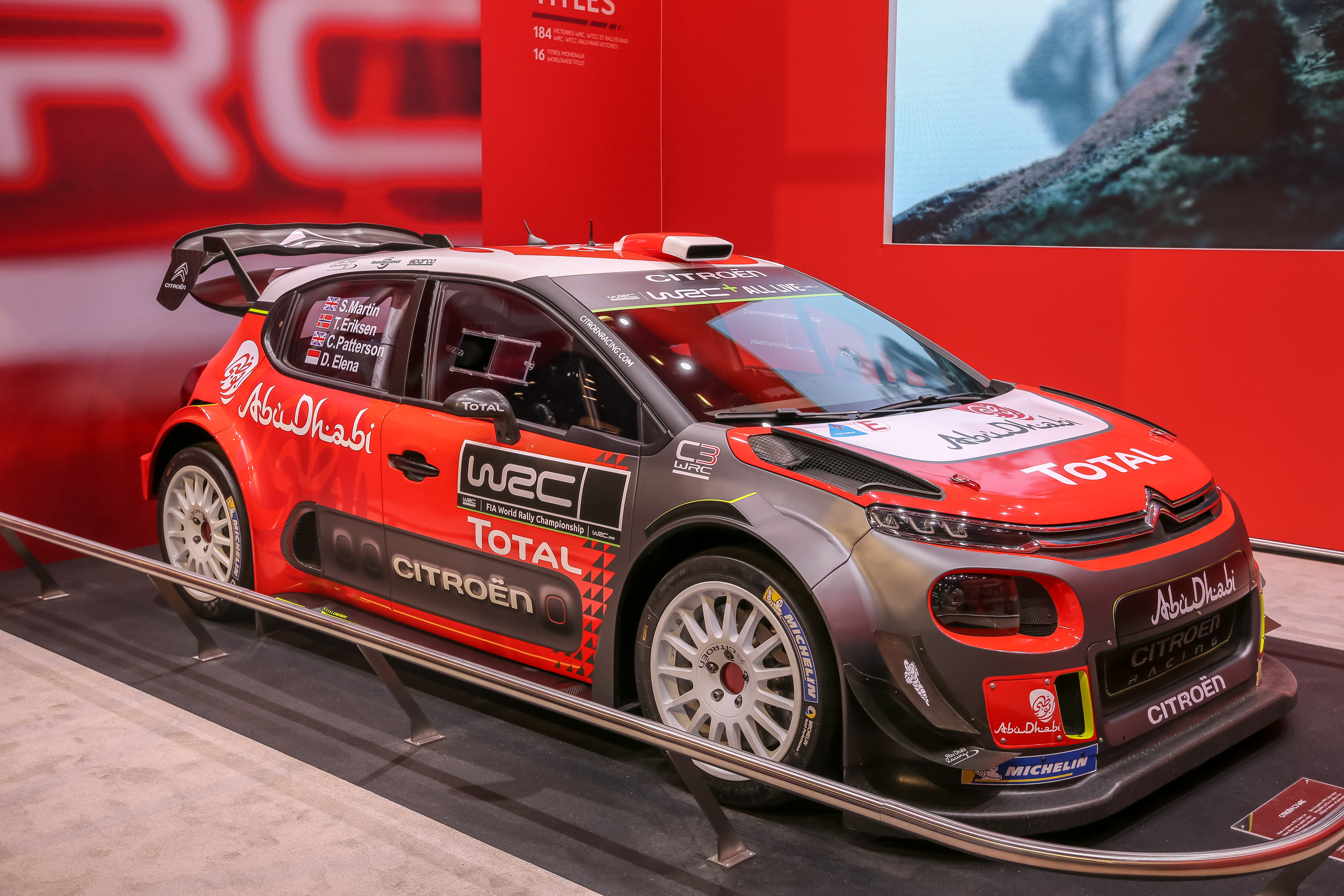
Citroën C3 WRC

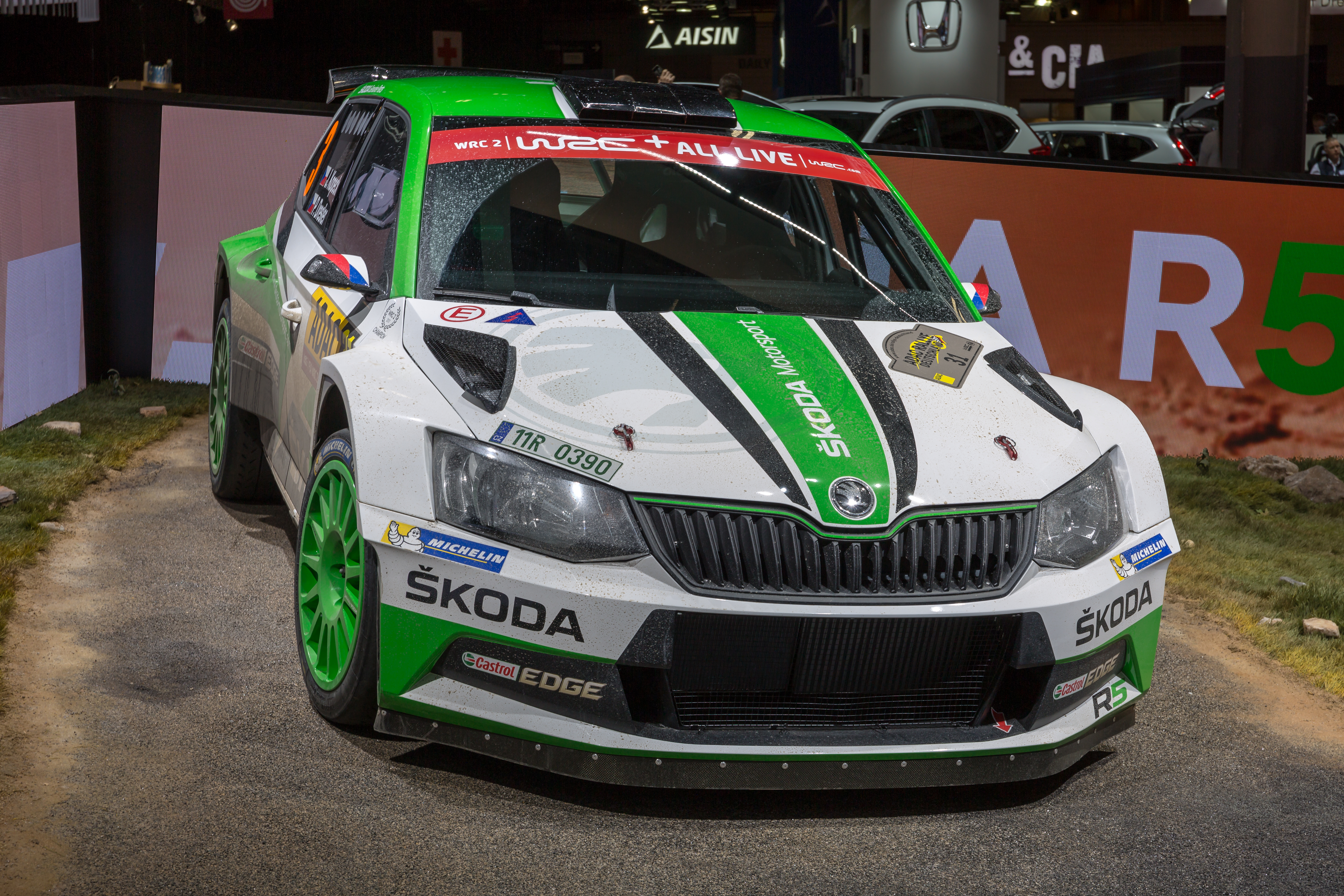
Skoda Fabia R5

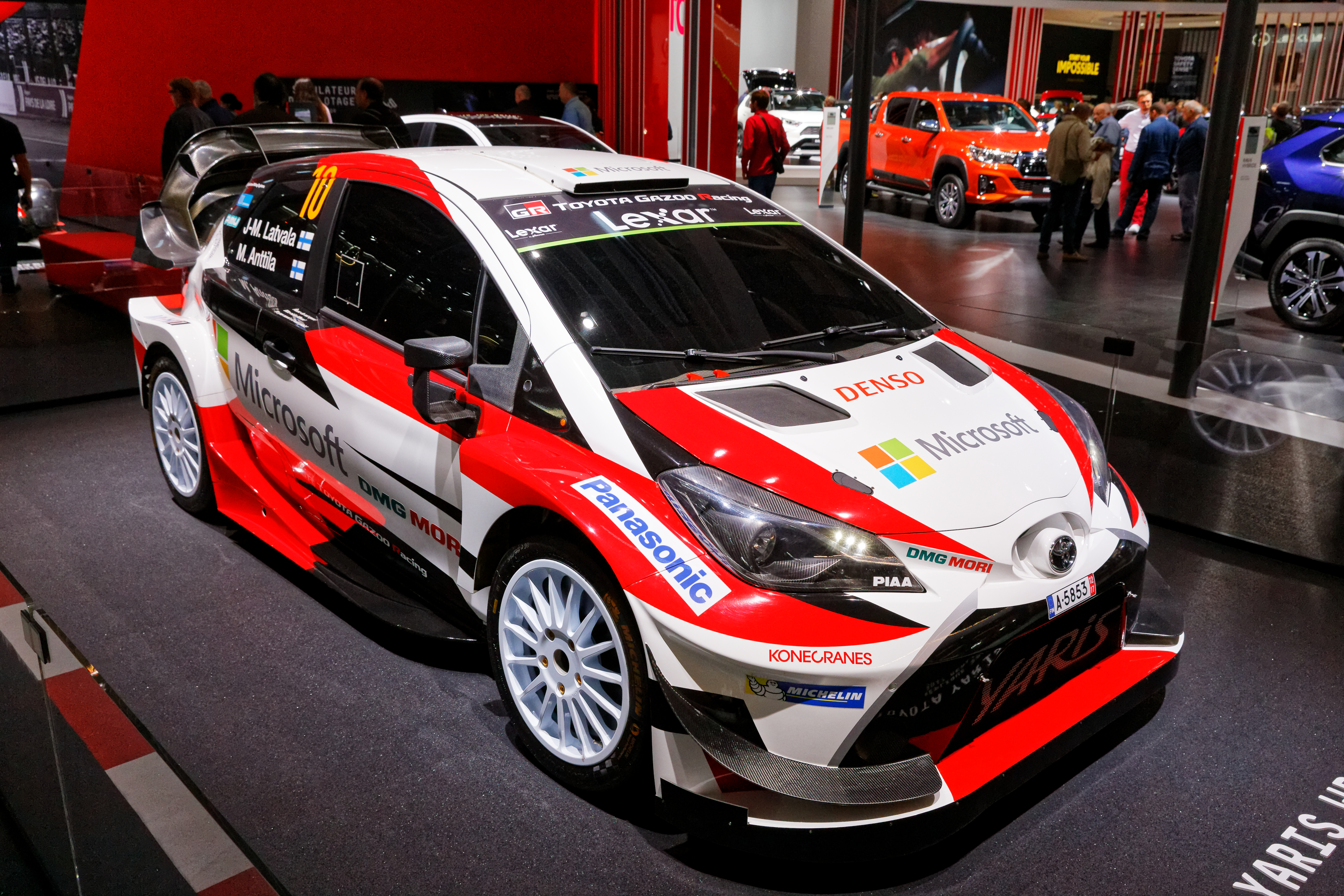
Toyota Yaris WRC

== Exhibitors ==
=== Company manufacturers ===
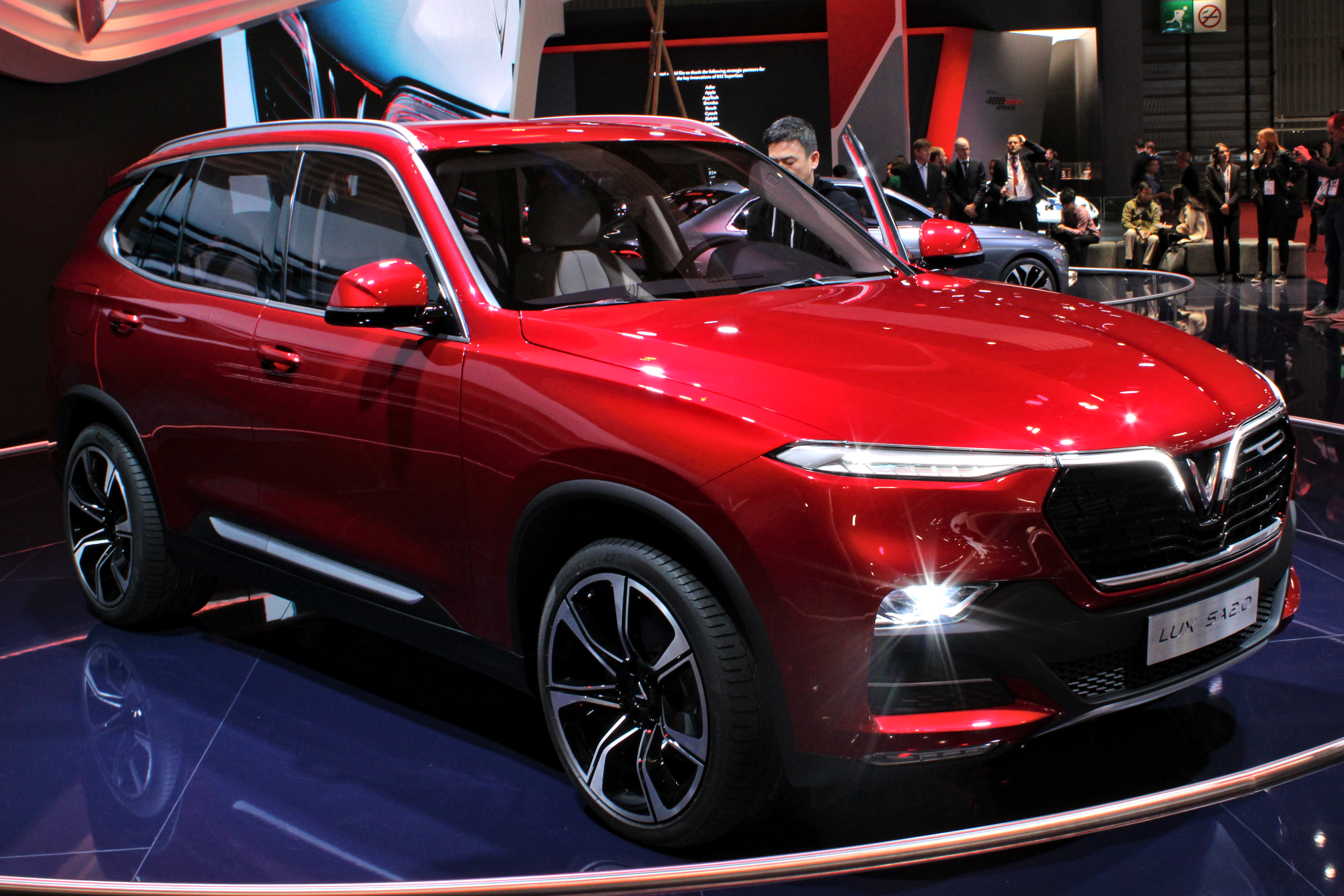
Vinfast Lux SA 2.0

- Aston Martin
- Audi
- BMW
- Citroën
- FLUTR
- Honda
- Hyundai
- Infiniti
- Isuzu
- Jaguar
- Kia
- Lamborghini
- Land Rover
- Lexus
- Mercedes-Benz
- Peugeot
- Porsche
- Škoda
- Tesla
- Toyota
- Vinfast

== See also ==
- Paris Motor Show
