= VinFast VF 8 =

Battery electric mid-size crossover SUV

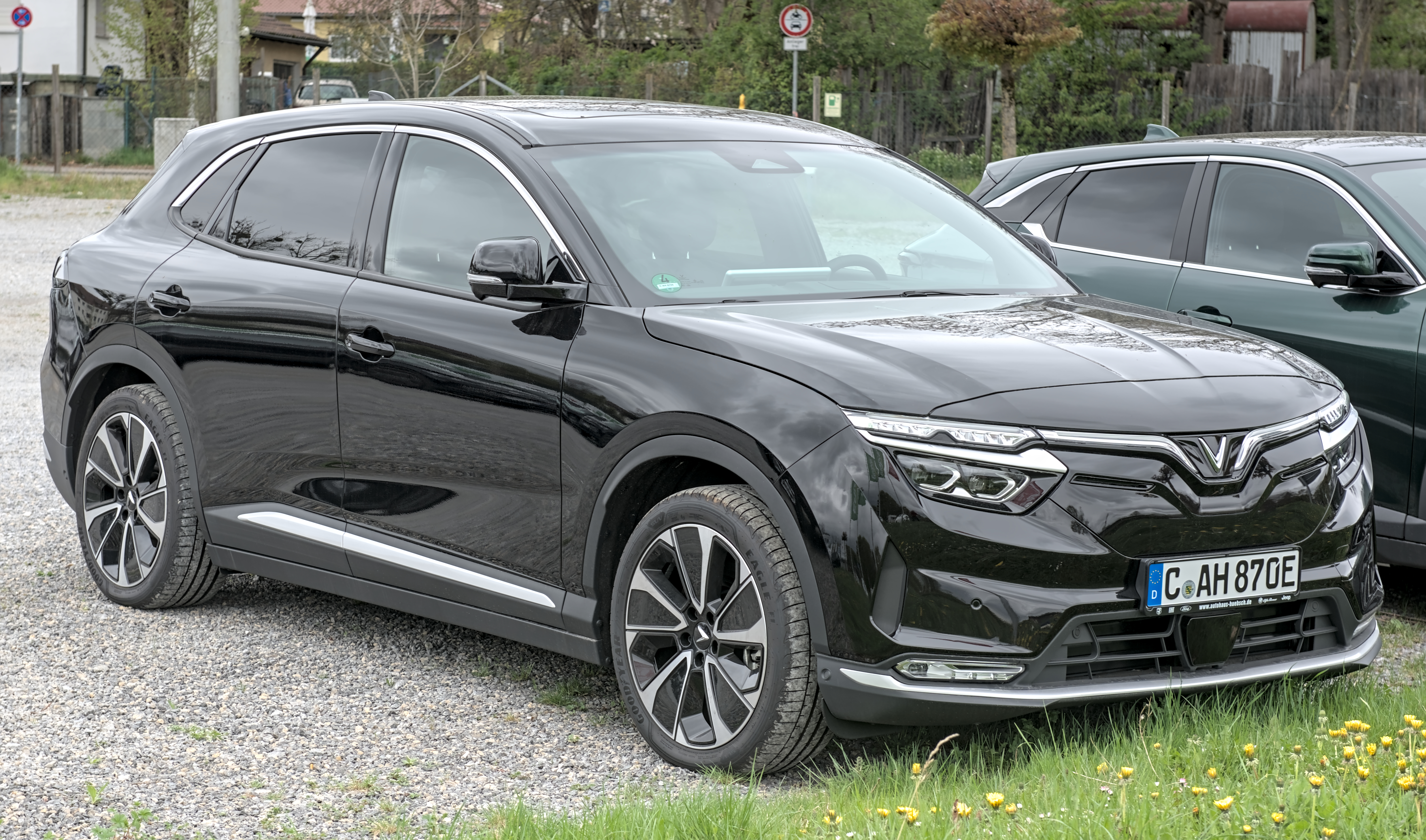
- VF 8 2025 in Stuttgart-Vaihingen

Overview
- Manufacturer: VinFast
- Production: 2022–present
- Model years: 2023–present

Body and chassis
- Class: Mid-size SUV (D-segment)
- Body style: 5-door crossover SUV

Chronology
- Predecessor: VinFast LUX SA2.0

The VinFast VF 8 is a battery electric mid-size SUV (D-segment) manufactured and marketed by VinFast of Vingroup from 2022. The model made its debut in the second half of January 2022, as one of the products to support the automaker's planned expansion to global markets.

== First generation (2022) ==
First generation
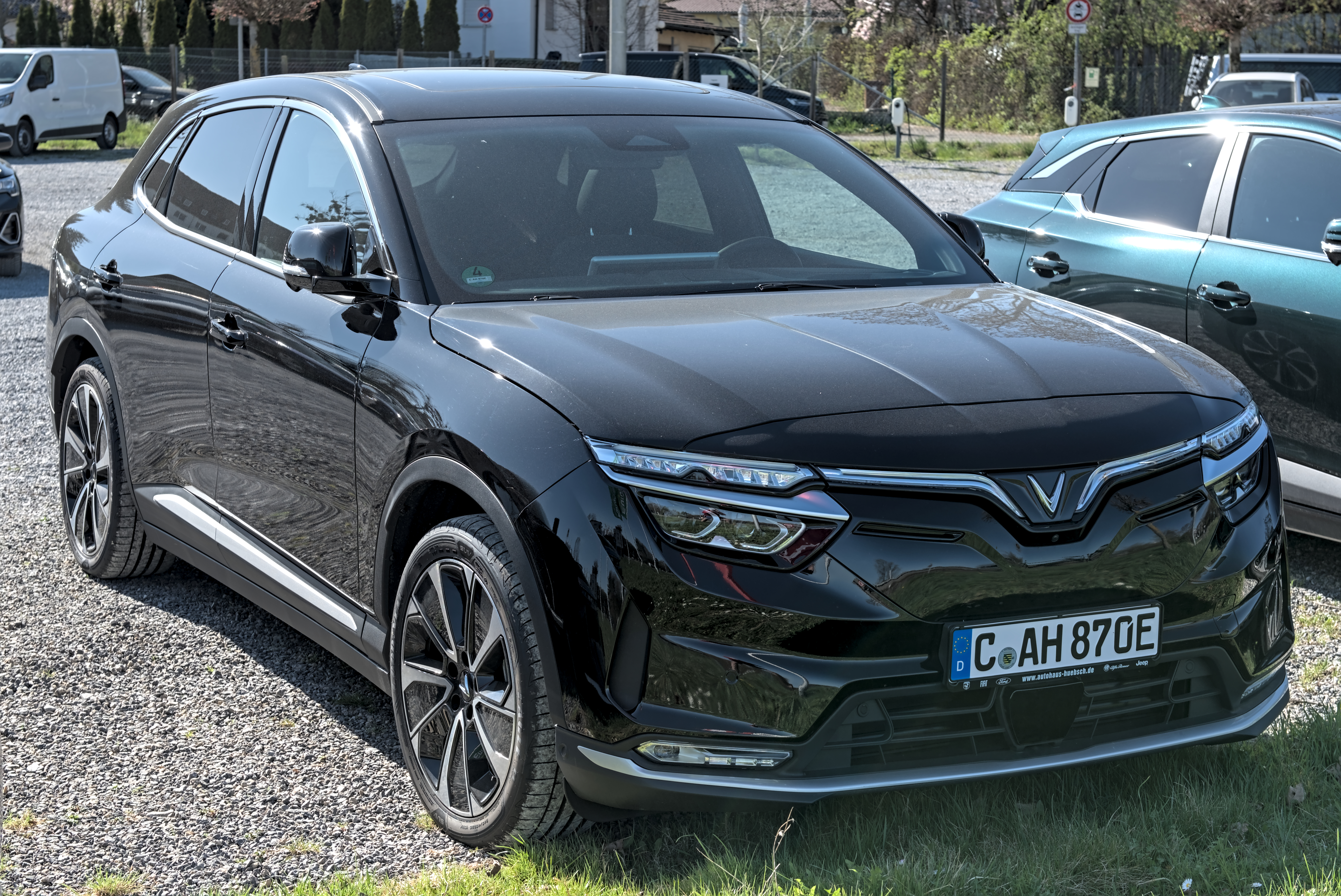
- VF 8 2025 in Stuttgart-Vaihingen

Overview
- Production: 2022–present
- Model years: 2023–present
- Assembly: Vietnam: Cát Hải (VinFast Trading and Production LLC, Hai Phong Plant)
- Designer: Pininfarina

Body and chassis
- Layout: Dual-motor, all-wheel drive
- Platform: VinFast VMG-C/D

Powertrain
- Electric motor: Permanent magnet
- Power output: 348 hp (260 kW) (Eco AWD); 402 hp (300 kW) (Plus AWD)
- Battery: 82 or 87.7 kWh Samsung SDI

Dimensions
- Wheelbase: 2,950 mm (116.1 in)
- Length: 4,750 mm (187.0 in)
- Width: 1,900 mm (74.8 in)
- Height: 1,660 mm (65.4 in)

The model was formerly known as the VinFast VF e35 and VinFast VF 32 during development. VinFast opened orders for the VF 8 in January 2022 in the domestic Vietnamese market, with the first deliveries to 100 Vietnamese customers commenced on September 10, 2022.

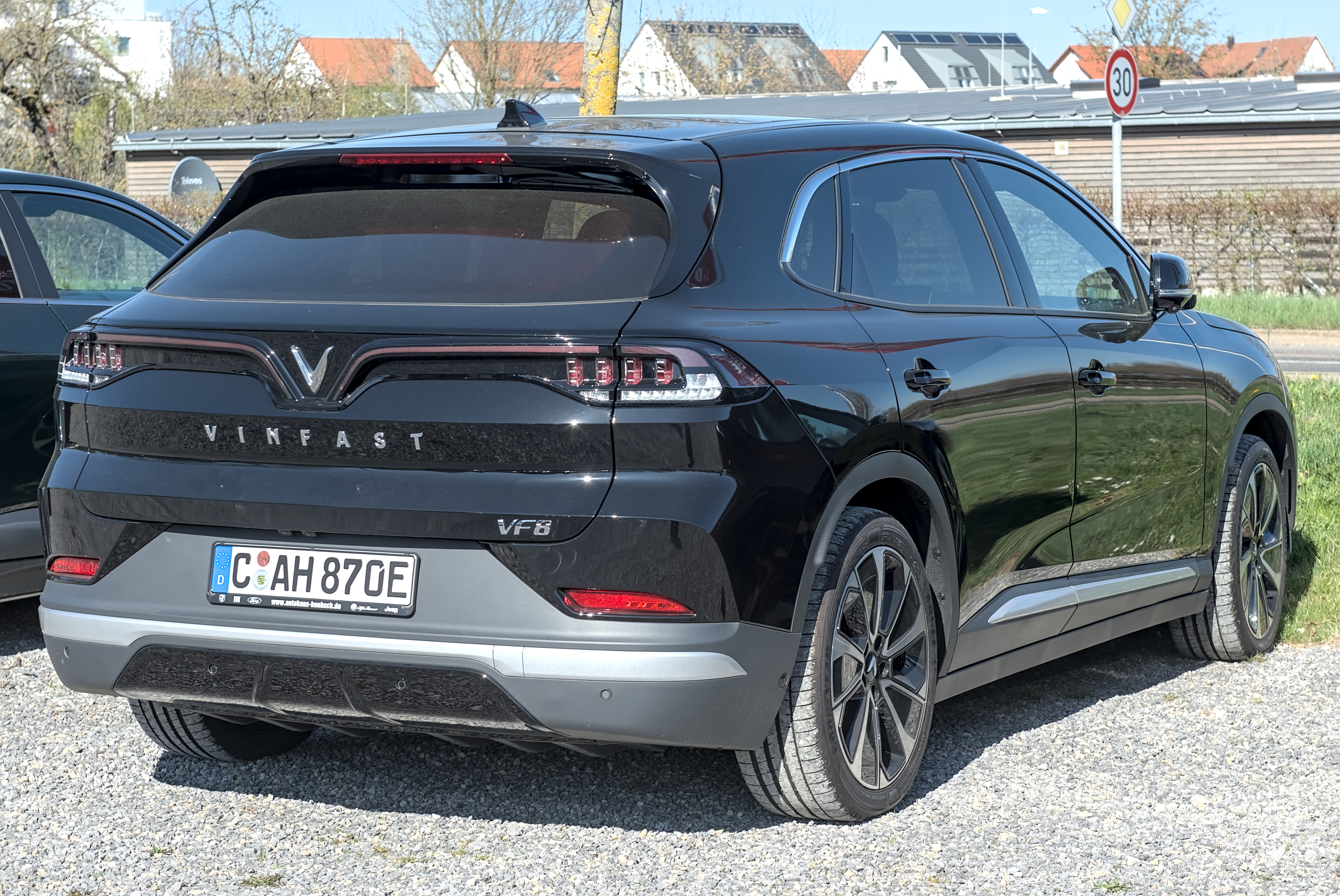
Rear

In the United States, VinFast opened six dealerships in California on July 14, 2022, showing both the VF 8 and VF 9, with deliveries planned for fall 2022. An assembly plant in Chatham County, North Carolina broke ground in summer 2023 with production of the VF 7, VF 8, and VF 9 slated to begin from 2028.

=== Design ===
The VF 8 is a crossover with round proportions combining chrome ornaments with a double strip of headlamps in the front of the body. Narrow LED daytime running lights are separated by a chrome bar, under which the rest of the headlamps are located. The car was styled by Pininfarina; VinFast's design team was led by director David Lyon.

==== Interior ====
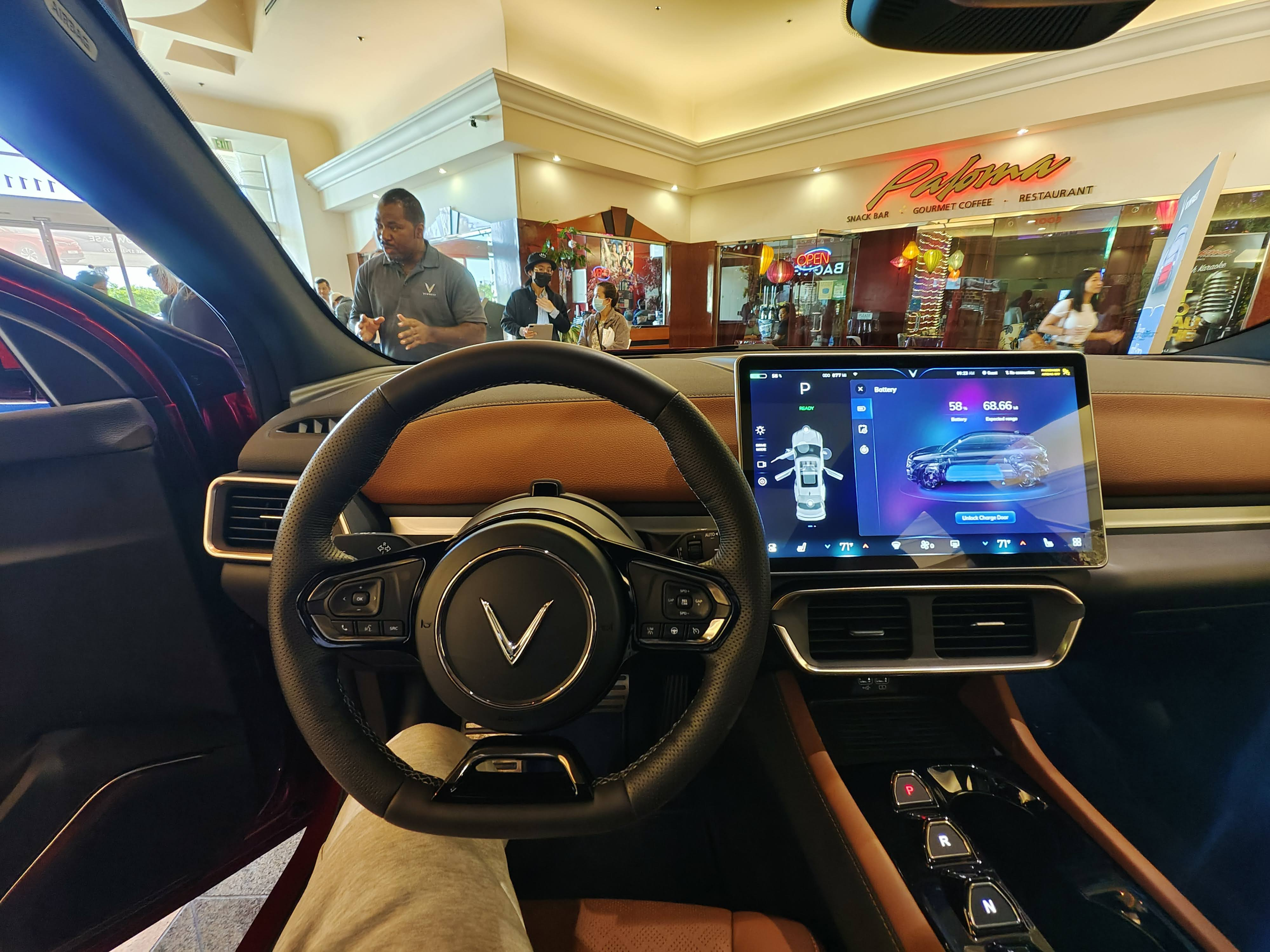
Interior

The dashboard has a two-colour aesthetic, with switches of driving modes in the centre tunnel, as well as a large multimedia system touch display. The traditional instrument panel has been replaced by the central multimedia screen and a head-up display projected on the windshield.

==== Drivetrain ====
The VF 8 is available with multiple traction motor arrangements. In the United States, the VF 8 has a dual-motor all-wheel-drive arrangement, with output of either 348 hp (260 kW; 353 PS) and 368 lb⋅ft (499 N⋅m) ("Eco" model) or 402 hp (300 kW; 408 PS) and 457 lb⋅ft (620 N⋅m) ("Plus"). In Vietnam, the VF 8 is also available in two versions: Eco and Plus. Both of them use dual-motor and all-wheel-drive configuration. The VF 8 Eco has 260 kW and 500 Nm, while the VF 8 Plus has 300 kW and 620 Nm.

The first batteries used in the VF 8 are from Samsung SDI. VinFast plans to add its own battery factory by August 2022. Both the Eco and Plus models are available with one of two traction battery options: "standard range", with 82 kW-hr usable, or "extended range", with 87.7 kW-hr usable (90 kW-hr gross). The estimated range depends on the powertrain and battery combination, ranging from 248 mi (399 km) ("Plus, standard range") to 292 mi (470 km) ("Eco, extended range") under the WLTP cycle. For the United States, the batteries are leased separately from the vehicle to reduce purchase costs and alleviate concerns regarding traction battery degradation. VinFast have stated they will replace a leased battery if it falls below 70% of initial capacity. Eventually, VinFast plans to offer the vehicle with a purchased battery.

=== Safety ===
On 18 September 2024, mechanical engineer Hazar Denli said he was sacked after raising safety concerns about VinFast testing. On 24 April 2024, a family of four was killed in a VinFast VF 8 crash in Pleasanton, California. Police reported the vehicle lost control, veered off the road, hit a pole, and caught fire.

In September 2024, the NHTSA's Office of Defects Investigation (ODI) initiated an investigation following 14 complaints regarding the VF 8's Lane Keeping Assistance (LKA) system. The complaints indicated that the system had difficulty accurately detecting lanes, provided incorrect steering inputs, and was challenging to override. The ODI cautioned that these problems could necessitate significant effort from drivers to maintain control, potentially raising the risk of accidents.

==== ASEAN NCAP ====
ASEAN NCAP test results Vinfast VF8 (2022)
| Test | Points |
|---|---|
| Overall: | 5 /5 stars |
| Adult occupant: | 35.44 |
| Child occupant: | 18.04 |
| Safety assist: | 17.14 |
| Motorcyclist Safety: | 13.75 |

==== Euro NCAP ====
Euro NCAP test results Vinfast VF 8 150 kW dual-motor Plus (LHD) (2023)
| Test | Points | % |
|---|---|---|
| Overall: | 4 /5 stars | |
| Adult occupant: | 30.6 | 76% |
| Child occupant: | 44 | 89% |
| Pedestrian: | 48.6 | 77% |
| Safety assist: | 14.4 | 79% |

=== Reception ===
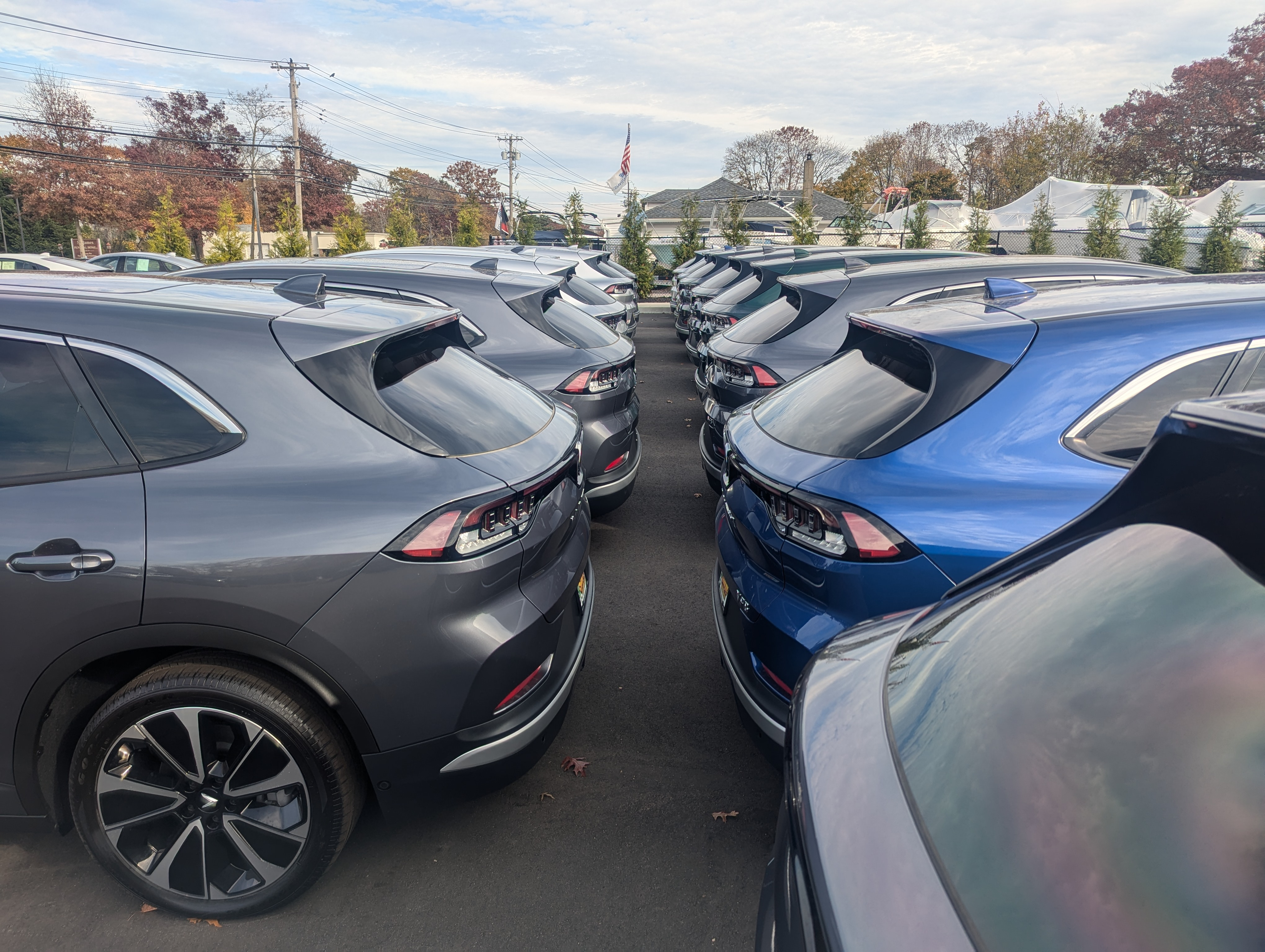
VinFast VF 8 lineup at Smith Haven Vinfast in Smithtown, New York

The VinFast VF 8 received a widely negative reception after press cars became available to automotive journalists in the United States. A number of well-established and broadly published automotive journalists and car critics have given the VF 8 poor reviews for virtually every metric.

Kevin Williams of Jalopnik test drove a pre-production model of the VF 8 which had at that time received Vietnamese sales approval. Williams remarked that the car "felt slow", with inconsistent performance between individual vehicles. He was highly critical of the vehicle's ride and handling, with visibly poor suspension control and unresponsive steering. He concluded that the VF 8 was an "underdeveloped, unfinished product that, quite frankly, would be an embarrassment in any market." Brian Wong of Green Car Reports also tested a pre-production model: he described the car as having noticeable body roll, poor braking performance, and poor throttle tuning.

Emme Hall of Green Car Reports later tested a production model and noted the car's poor build quality, and again described poor suspension and braking performance. However, Hall praised the VF 8's infotainment system as well-organized and responsive, and commended VinFast for its 10-year warranty. Hall concluded that if VinFast had taken a slower timeline to sort through the VF 8's issues, "it might actually have a decent car."

Road & Track's reviewer Mack Hogan also criticised the VF 8 for poor build quality, and claimed that the VF 8 had the worst ride quality and steering of any car he had reviewed. Hogan also complained of poor braking performance and constant alarms from the car's driver assist features.

Scott Evans, writing for MotorTrend, said largely the same, again complaining of poor performance and numerous malfunctioning systems and driver aids, while also describing inconsistent and poor build quality across his car and those of other journalists. Evans noted that most of the problems he experienced with the VF 8 could, in theory, be rectified with software upgrades, but issues such as the poor suspension, an uncomfortable interior, and poor build quality could only be fixed with changes at the factory. Evans did, however, praise the car's interior space, its adaptive cruise control and steering assistance, and said that the heads-up display and infotainment system were both impressive but could be better organized. In contrast to other reviewers, he said that the VF 8's braking performance was "shockingly good", and said that the car appeared to have much better range than advertised. Evans concluded that VinFast "have the right idea", but that he would "be embarrassed to look a customer in the eye when handing over the keys to this vehicle" in its current state.

Steven Ewing's review for InsideEVs likewise described poor build quality, criticised the organization of controls within the infotainment system, and complained of annoying and persistent driver assistance alerts. He also criticised the VF 8's suspension and steering.

Ezra Dyer of Car and Driver also noted that the VF 8 showed better range than advertised and commended VinFast's warranty, but likewise complained of sub-standard build and ride quality. Dyer concluded that the car's shortcomings could be forgiven if it had been "hilariously inexpensive", but were unacceptable given the asking price.

== Second generation (2026) ==
Second generation

Overview
- Production: 2026 (to commence)
- Model years: 2027

Body and chassis
- Layout: Front-motor, Front-wheel-drive (Vietnam market only)

Powertrain
- Power output: 228 hp (170 kW; 231 PS) (FWD, Vietnam)
- Battery: 60.13 kWh Samsung SDI NMC (FWD)

The second generation was revealed on 21 May 2026.
