= VinFast LUX A2.0 =

Vietnamese executive sedan

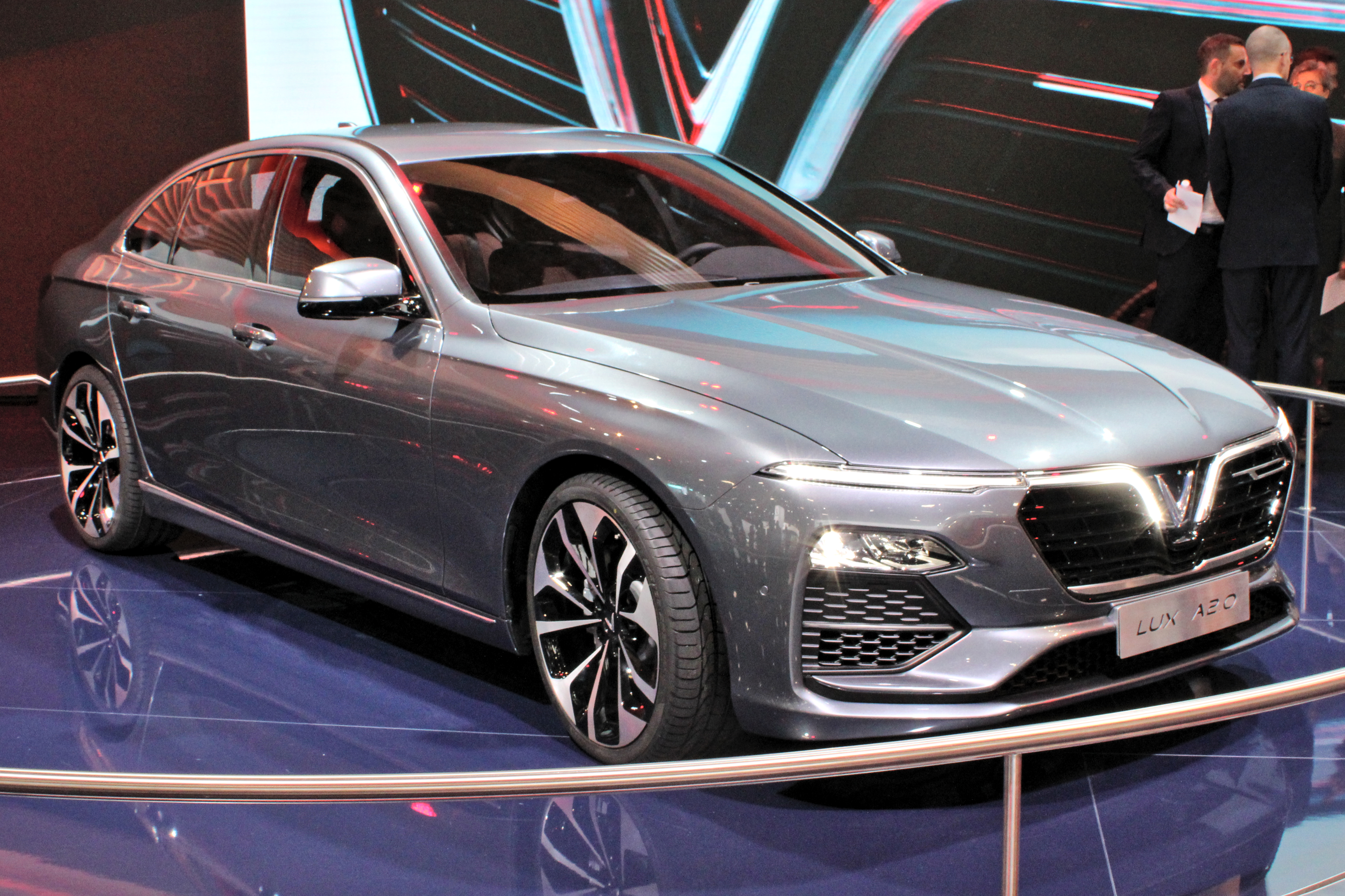
- Vinfast Lux A 2.0

Overview
- Manufacturer: VinFast
- Production: 2019–2022
- Assembly: Vietnam: Haiphong (VinFast Trading and Production LLC)
- Designer: Pininfarina

Body and chassis
- Class: Executive car (E)
- Body style: 4-door sedan
- Layout: Front-engine, rear-wheel-drive
- Platform: BMW L6
- Related: BMW 5 Series (F10)

Powertrain
- Engine: 2.0 L BMW N20B20 turbo I4 (petrol)
- Power output: 129.4–170 kW (174–228 hp; 176–231 PS)
- Transmission: 8-speed automatic

Dimensions
- Wheelbase: 2,968 mm (116.9 in)
- Length: 4,973 mm (195.8 in)
- Width: 1,900 mm (74.8 in)
- Height: 1,464 mm (57.6 in)

The VinFast LUX A2.0 is a four-door executive sedan produced by Vietnamese automaker VinFast between 2019 and 2022. The vehicle was built on a BMW 5 Series (F10) platform restyled by Pininfarina. It was revealed at the 2018 Paris Motor Show alongside the VinFast LUX SA2.0 crossover SUV.

== Overview ==
The LUX A2.0 is designed by Pininfarina, based on the F10 BMW 5 Series.

The LUX A2.0 was revealed at the 2018 Paris Motor Show alongside the VinFast LUX SA2.0. The production of LUX A2.0 started pilot production in March 2019 with full production in September 2019 at Vinfast's Haiphong factory. The LUX A2.0 was priced at VND990 million ($43,043) before the price change to VND1.5 billion ($65,217).

=== Engine ===
The LUX A2.0 is powered by a 2.0 L BMW N20B20 turbocharged four-cylinder petrol engine that is mated to an 8-speed automatic transmission.

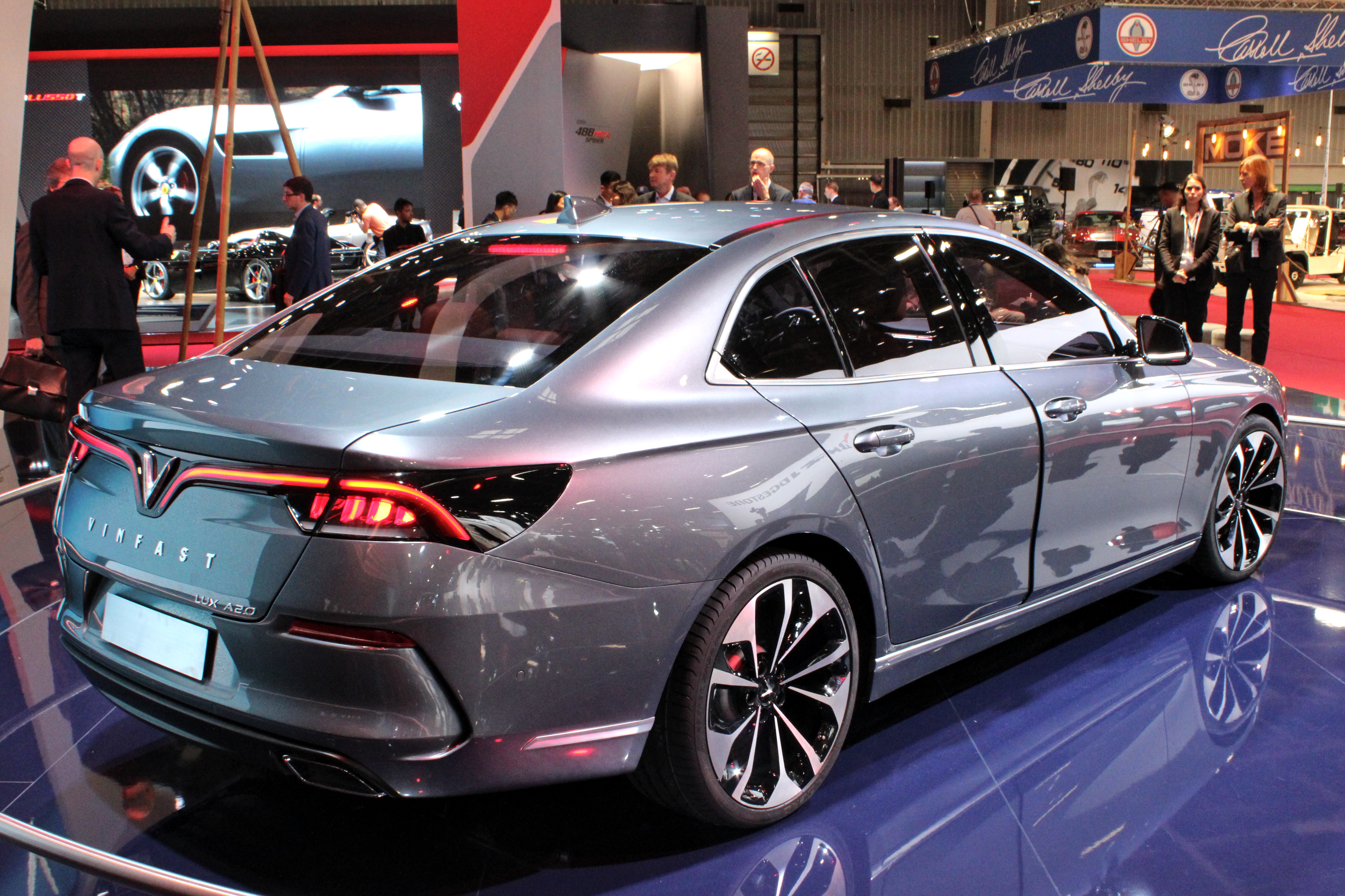
Rear view

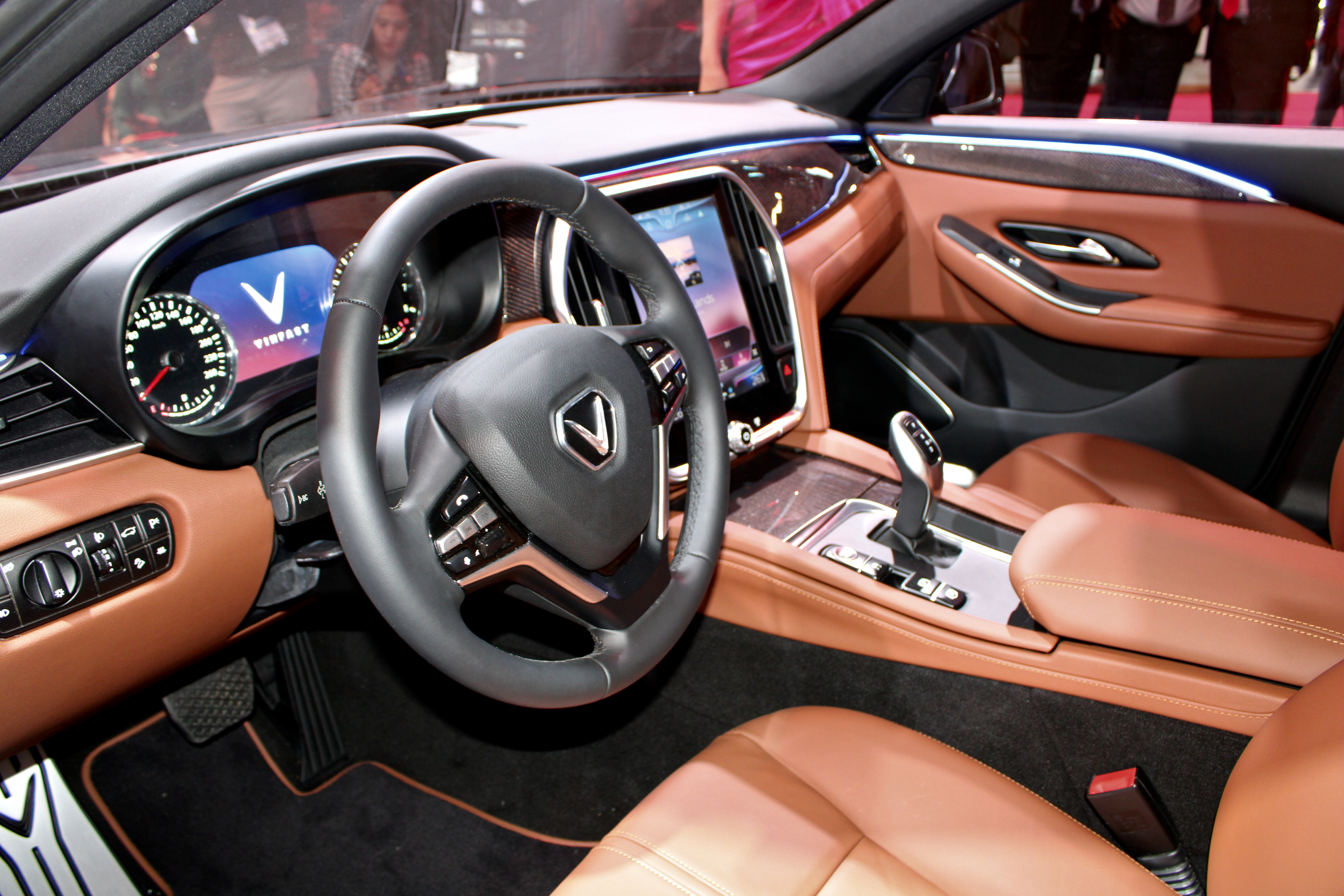
Interior

=== Safety ===
The LUX A2.0 received a five-star rating from the ASEAN NCAP from a crash test in September 2019.

ASEAN NCAP test results Vinfast LUX A2.0 (2019)
Test	Points
Overall:	5 /5 stars
Adult occupant:	46.89
Child occupant:	21.81
Safety assist:	19.44

== External link ==
- Official website
  - Brochure Sedan VinFast LUX A2.0
