= VinFast LUX SA2.0 =

Mid-size luxury crossover SUV

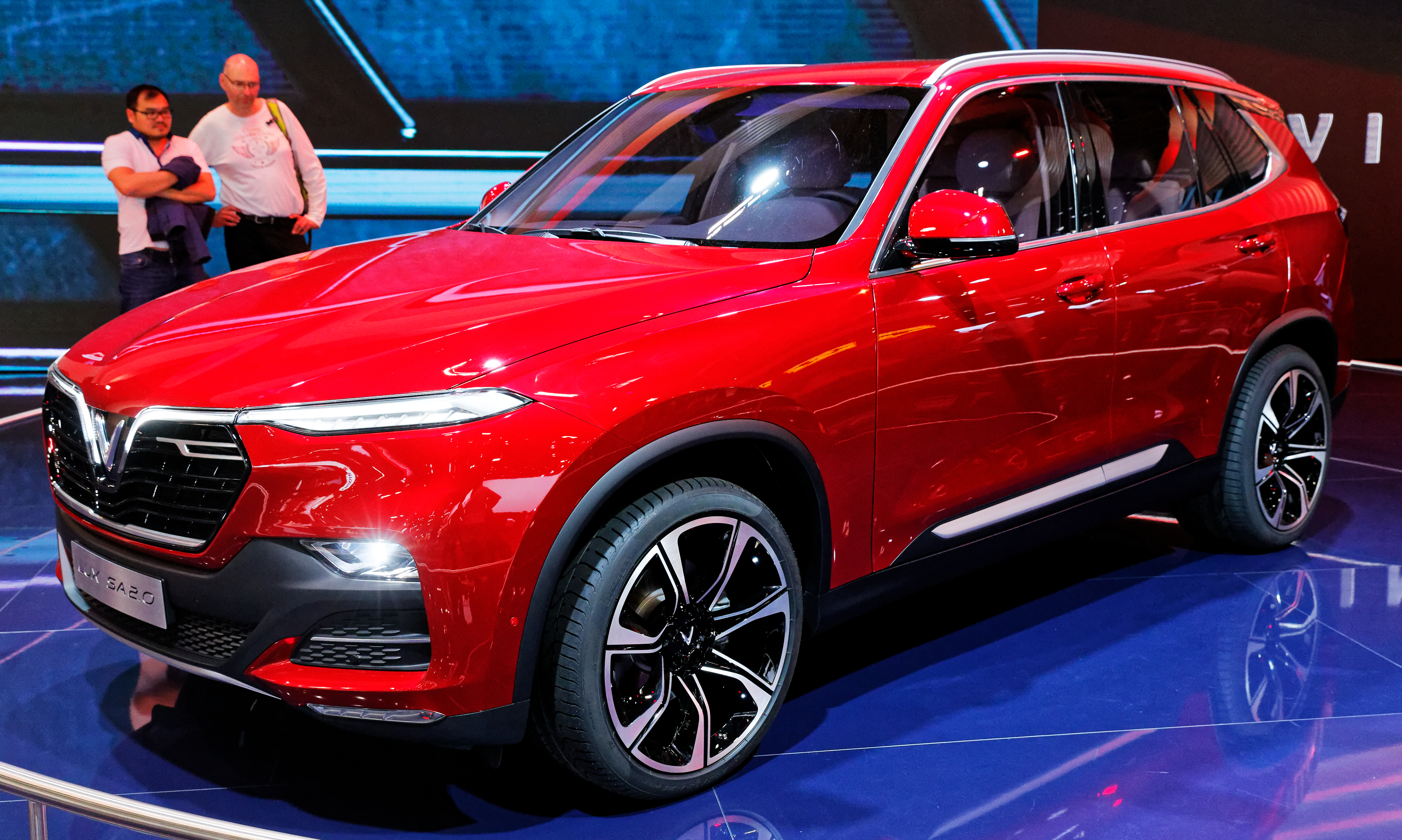
- VinFast LUX SA2.0

Overview
- Manufacturer: VinFast
- Production: 2019–2022
- Assembly: Vietnam: Haiphong (VinFast Trading and Production LLC)
- Designer: Pininfarina

Body and chassis
- Class: Mid-size luxury crossover SUV
- Body style: 5-door SUV
- Layout: Front-engine, rear-wheel-drive; Front-engine, all-wheel-drive
- Related: BMW X5 (F15)

Powertrain
- Engine: Petrol: 2.0 L BMW N20B20 turbo I4; 6.2 L GM LT1 V8 (President)
- Power output: 170 kW (228 hp; 231 PS)
- Transmission: 8-speed ZF 8HP automatic

Dimensions
- Wheelbase: 2,933 mm (115.5 in)
- Length: 4,940 mm (194.5 in)
- Width: 1,960 mm (77.2 in)
- Height: 1,773 mm (69.8 in)

Chronology
- Successor: VinFast VF 8

The VinFast LUX SA2.0 is a 5+2-seater mid-size luxury crossover SUV produced by Vietnamese automaker VinFast between 2019 and 2022. The vehicle was built on a BMW X5 (F15) platform restyled by Pininfarina. It was revealed at the 2018 Paris Motor Show alongside the VinFast LUX A2.0 sedan.

== Overview ==
The VinFast LUX SA2.0 is designed by Italian design company Pininfarina and is based on the F15-generation BMW X5.

The VinFast LUX SA2.0 was revealed at the 2018 Paris Motor Show alongside the VinFast LUX A2.0 sedan. It started in pilot production March 2019 with full production beginning in September 2019 at VinFast's Haiphong factory. The LUX SA2.0 was priced at VND1.415 billion (US$61,552) before the price change to VND2 billion ($86,956).

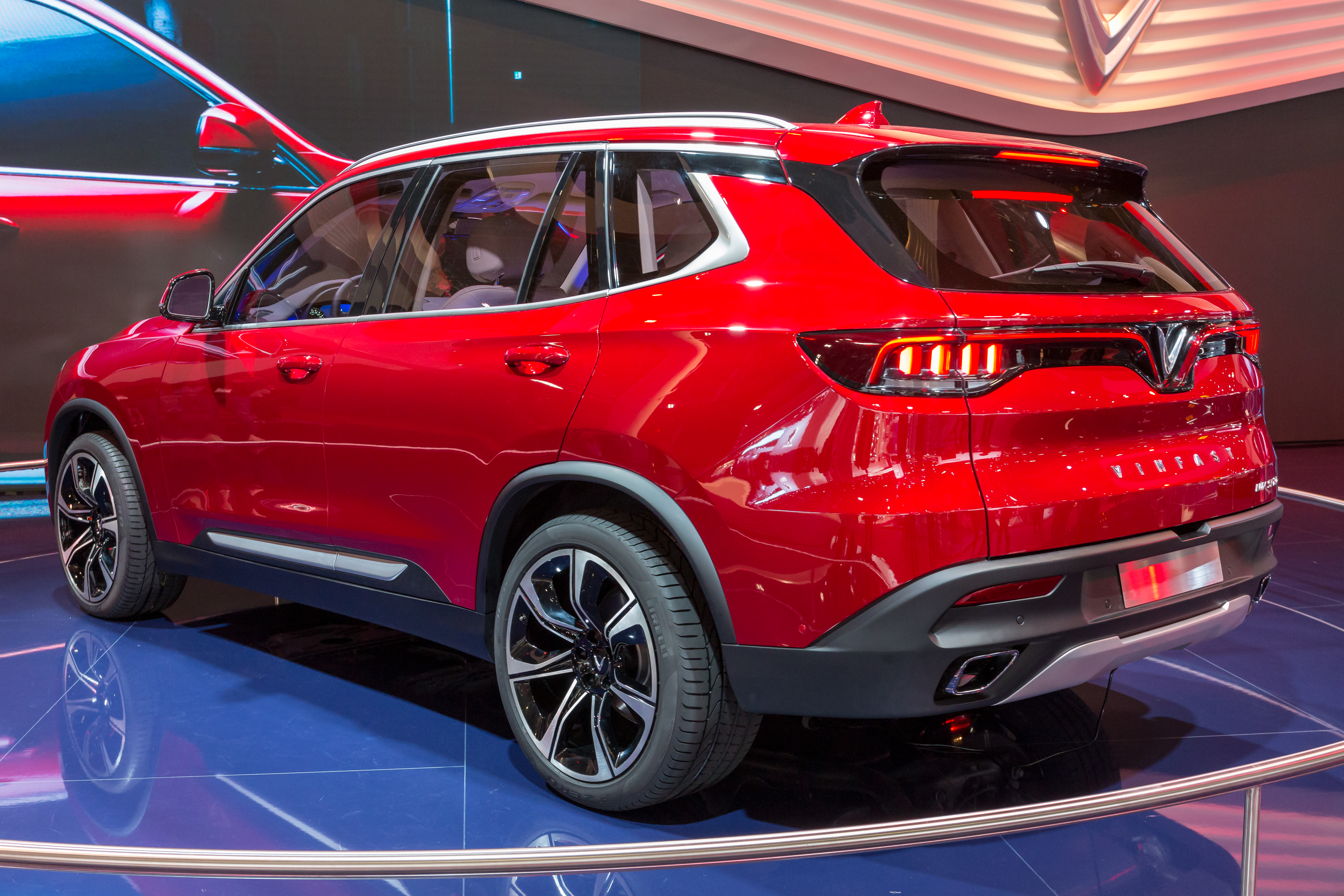
Rear view

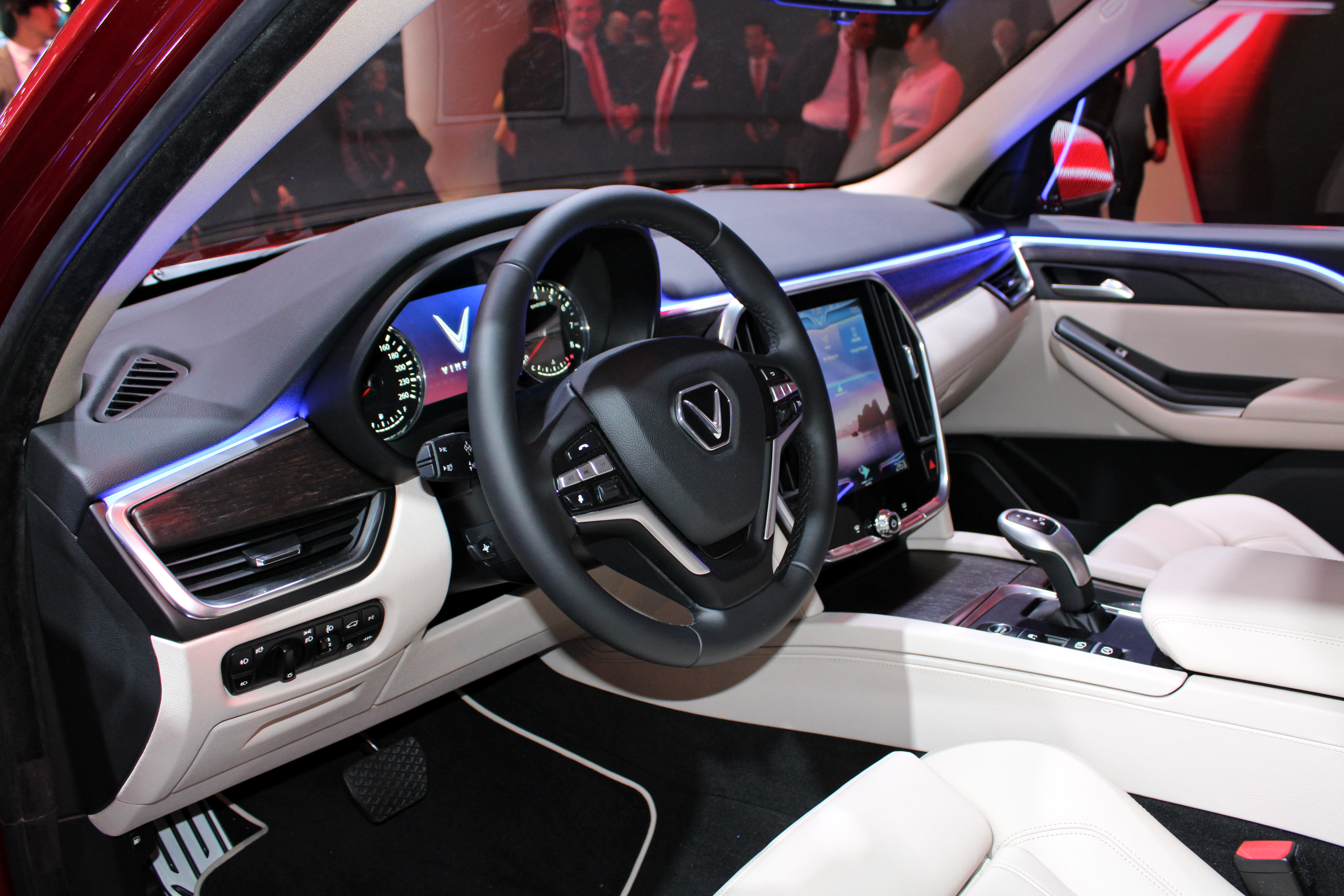
Interior

=== Engine ===
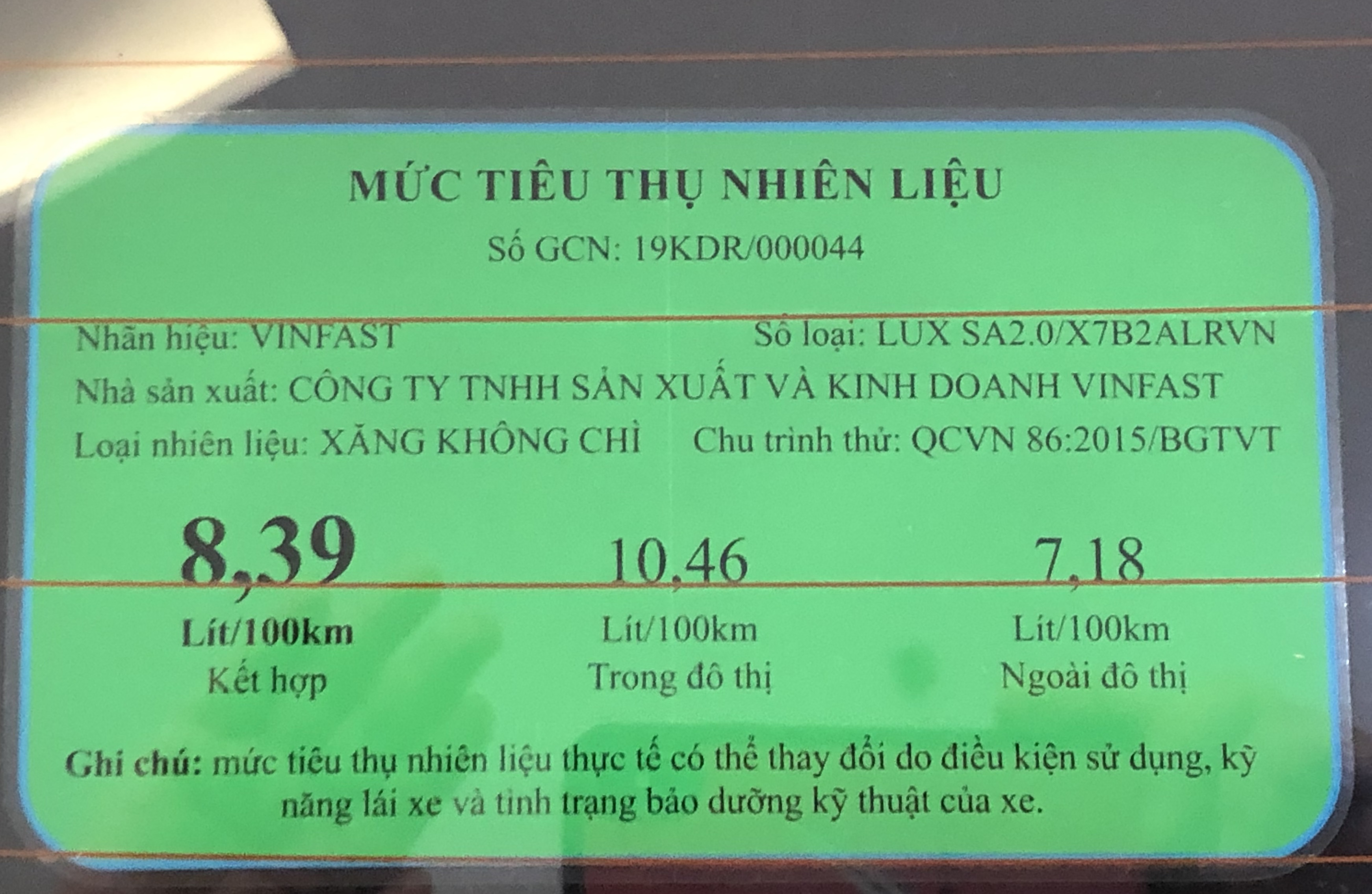
Fuel consumption label

The LUX SA2.0 is powered by a 2.0 L BMW N20B20 turbocharged four-cylinder petrol engine that is mated to an 8-speed ZF 8HP automatic transmission.

== VinFast President ==
The VinFast President is the finalized production variant of the LUX V8 concept and a limited edition variant of the LUX SA2.0 produced since September 7, 2020. It is powered by a 6.2-litre V8, generating 455 hp (339 kW; 461 PS) and 624 N⋅m (460 lb⋅ft; 64 kg⋅m) of torque. The engine model has not been disclosed officially, however is it generally believed to be a GM LS V8. Some have suggested that it has been sourced from FCA, possibly a Chrysler 6.2 Hemi block without supercharger.

It is reported that around 500 President units will be produced with a retail price of $164,000.

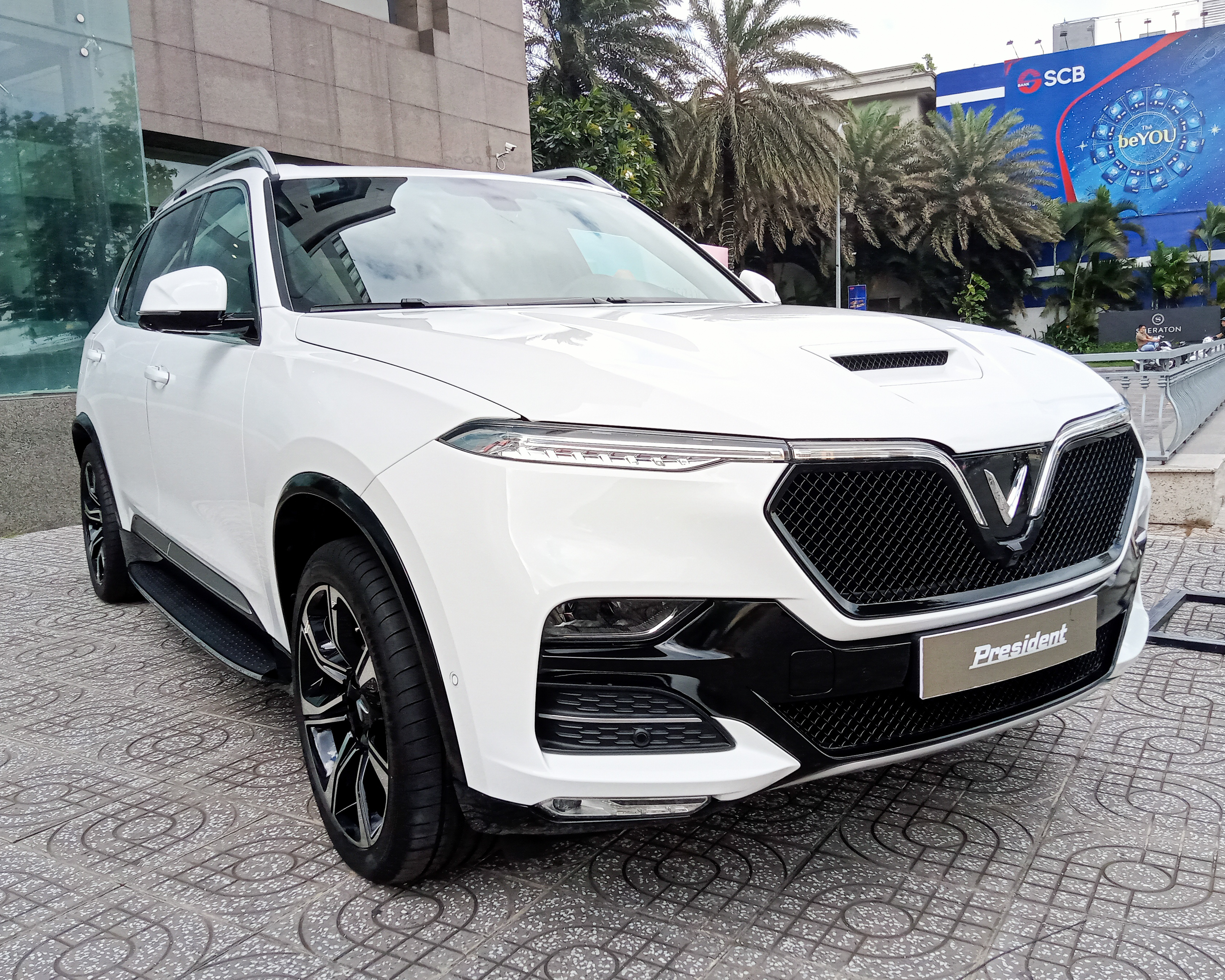
VinFast President front

VinFast President rear

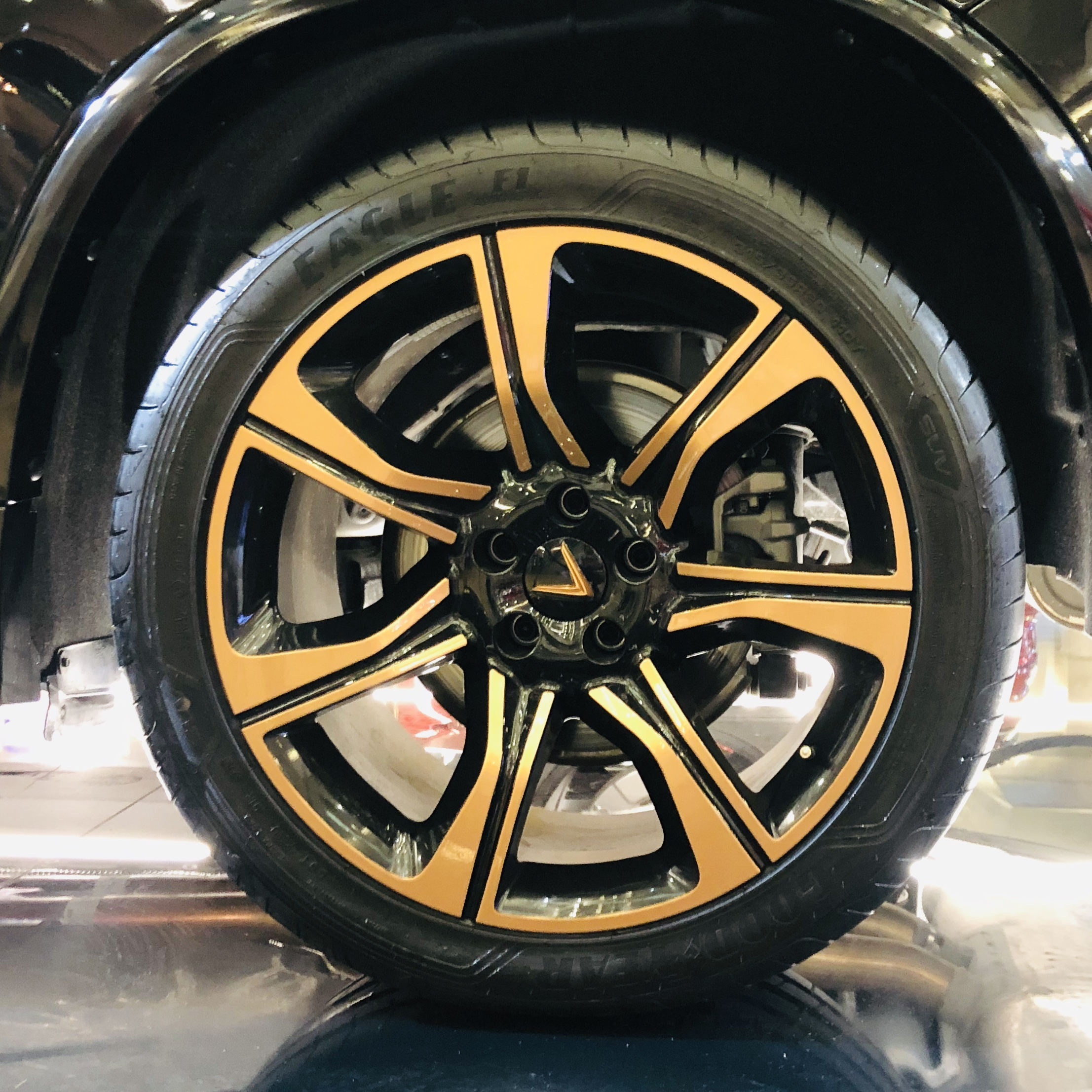
VinFast President wheel design

== Safety ==
The LUX SA2.0 received a five-star rating from the ASEAN NCAP from a crash test in September 2019.

ASEAN NCAP test results Vinfast LUX SA2.0 (2019)
| Test | Points |
|---|---|
| Overall: | 5 /5 stars |
| Adult occupant: | 46.45 |
| Child occupant: | 22.73 |
| Safety assist: | 15.28 |

== Sales ==
| Year | Vietnam |
|---|---|
| 2020 | 5,456 |
| 2021 | |
