= Automotive industry in Vietnam =

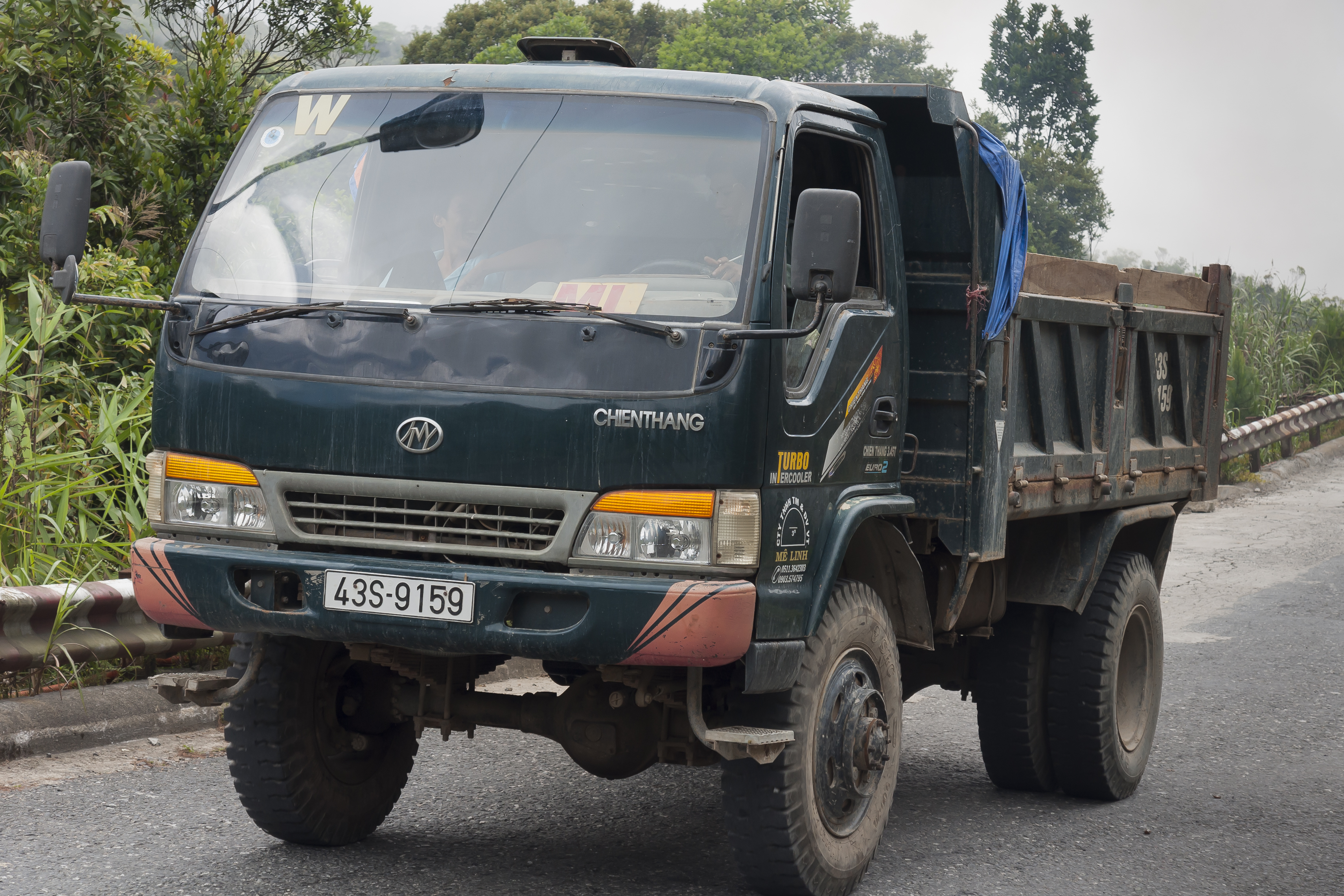
Chien Thang truck

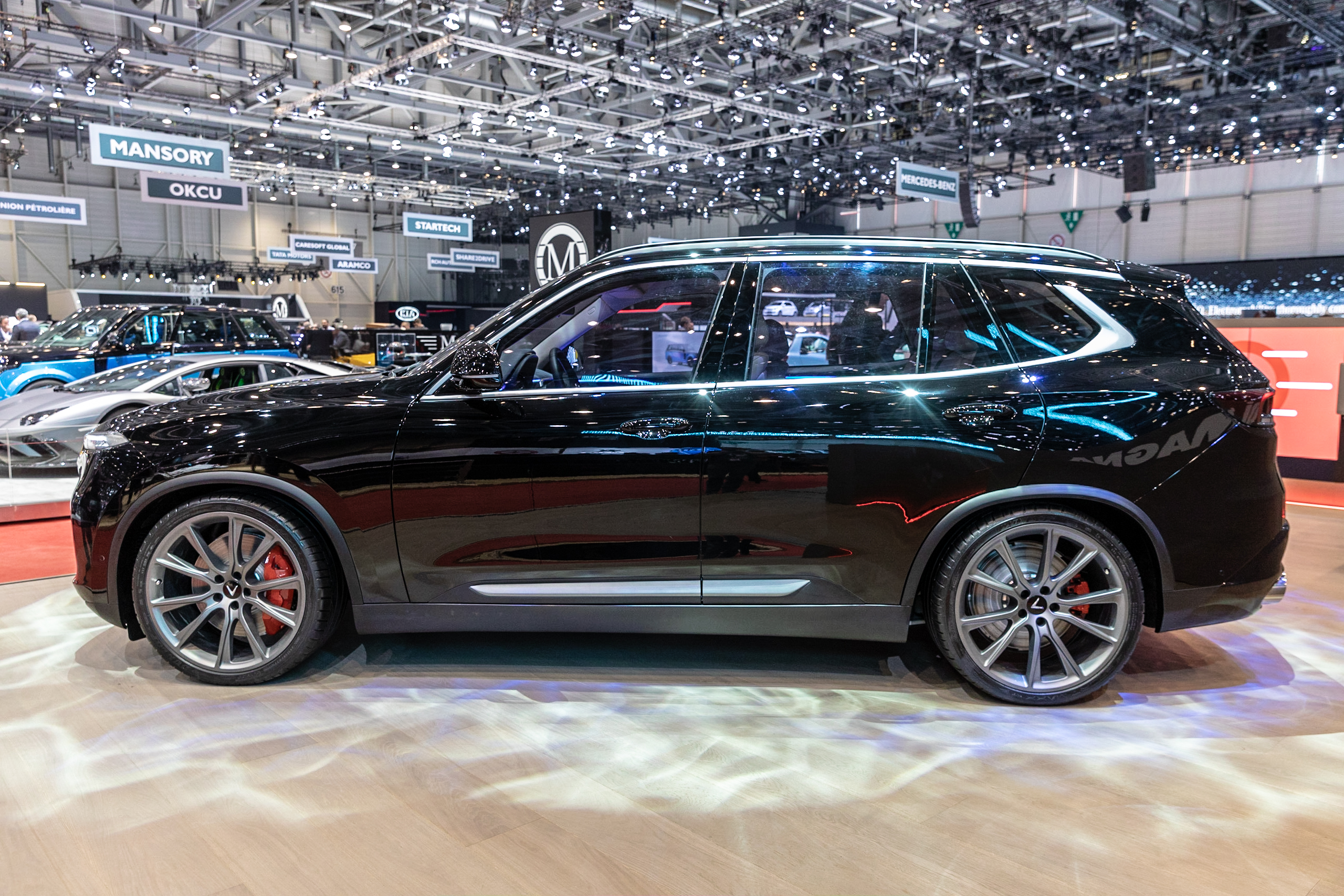
VinFast LUX SUV V8 at the 2019 Geneva Motor Show

The automotive industry in Vietnam is a fast-growing sector mainly reliant on domestic sales. All currently produced models are designed abroad by foreign brands, and many rely on knock-down kit production. Due to high import taxes on automobiles (83%), the Vietnamese government protects domestic manufacturing. Although Vietnam is a member of the ASEAN Free Trade Area, automobile imports fall under an exception. Since January 1, 2018, the 30% import tax has been discontinued as part of ASEAN agreements. Currently, the Vietnamese motor industry is not deemed competitive enough to make exports feasible. As of April 2018, 85% of car sales in Vietnam were produced domestically from knock-down kits.

Before Đổi Mới, automobile ownership in Vietnam was limited, and the vehicles present were imported from Second World countries that were more politically aligned with the government. In 1995, the first automobile factories were built, using knock-down kits to produce vehicles, starting with Mitsubishi, Toyota, and Isuzu. Between 2003 and 2006, the automobile sales tax increased from 5% to 50%, slowing down car sales.

The Vietnamese car market is relatively small, albeit the fastest growing in Southeast Asia.

Most automobile manufacturers in Vietnam are members of the (non-governmental) Vietnam Automobile Manufacturers' Association (VAMA).

== Auto parts ==
Vietnam has a US$900 million trade surplus in car parts, totaling US$4.4 billion of car part exports. Most of this production is by foreign owned businesses operating in Vietnam. In total the number of parts suppliers was 226 in 2018. In 2018, the share of locally produced parts in the Vietnamese automotive industry was just 10%, compared to up to 80% in Thailand and Indonesia. Due to most advanced parts having to be imported, locally produced vehicles are generally more expensive than foreign built vehicles.

THACO INDUSTRIES, a subsidiary of Truong Hai Group (THACO), operates several supporting-industry plants at the Chu Lai complex in Quang Nam, producing OEM automotive components and sub-assemblies for domestic and export markets. In addition to exporting semi-trailers to North America, the company has the manufacturing capability to supply other products to that market, including automotive springs, chassis, automotive components, and industrial equipment.

== Taxes on motor vehicles ==
Vietnam has a Special Consumption Tax that applies to cars. For small cars with less than nine seats and 1.5-litre engines or smaller, it adds an extra 35 percent to the price. However, this increases with every additional litre or so to 150 percent for cars with engines with a capacity of 6 litres or more. Despite this, Lamborghini, Porsche, and McLaren all have dealerships in Vietnam.

Furthermore, cars in Vietnam are also subject to Vietnam’s Value Added Tax–this is normally 10 percent, but, is currently sitting at 8 percent as part of a government stimulus package.

== Foreign brands ==
=== Chevrolet ===
GM owned a CKD-kit assembly plant in Hanoi, but the plant was sold to Vinfast in 2018.

=== Daihatsu ===
Daihatsu subsidiary Vindaco produced the Terios from CKDs in Vietnam. The company was dissolved after four years after sales proved too low.

=== Fiat ===
Mekong Auto Corporation was founded in 1991.

=== Ford ===
Ford Vietnam is a joint venture between Ford Motor Company (75%) and Song Cong Diesel Company (25%), with assembly taking place in Hải Dương province in the north of Vietnam.

=== Hino ===
Hino trucks are built in Vietnam in a joint venture with Vinamotor. Hino has been present in Vietnam since 1996.

=== Honda ===
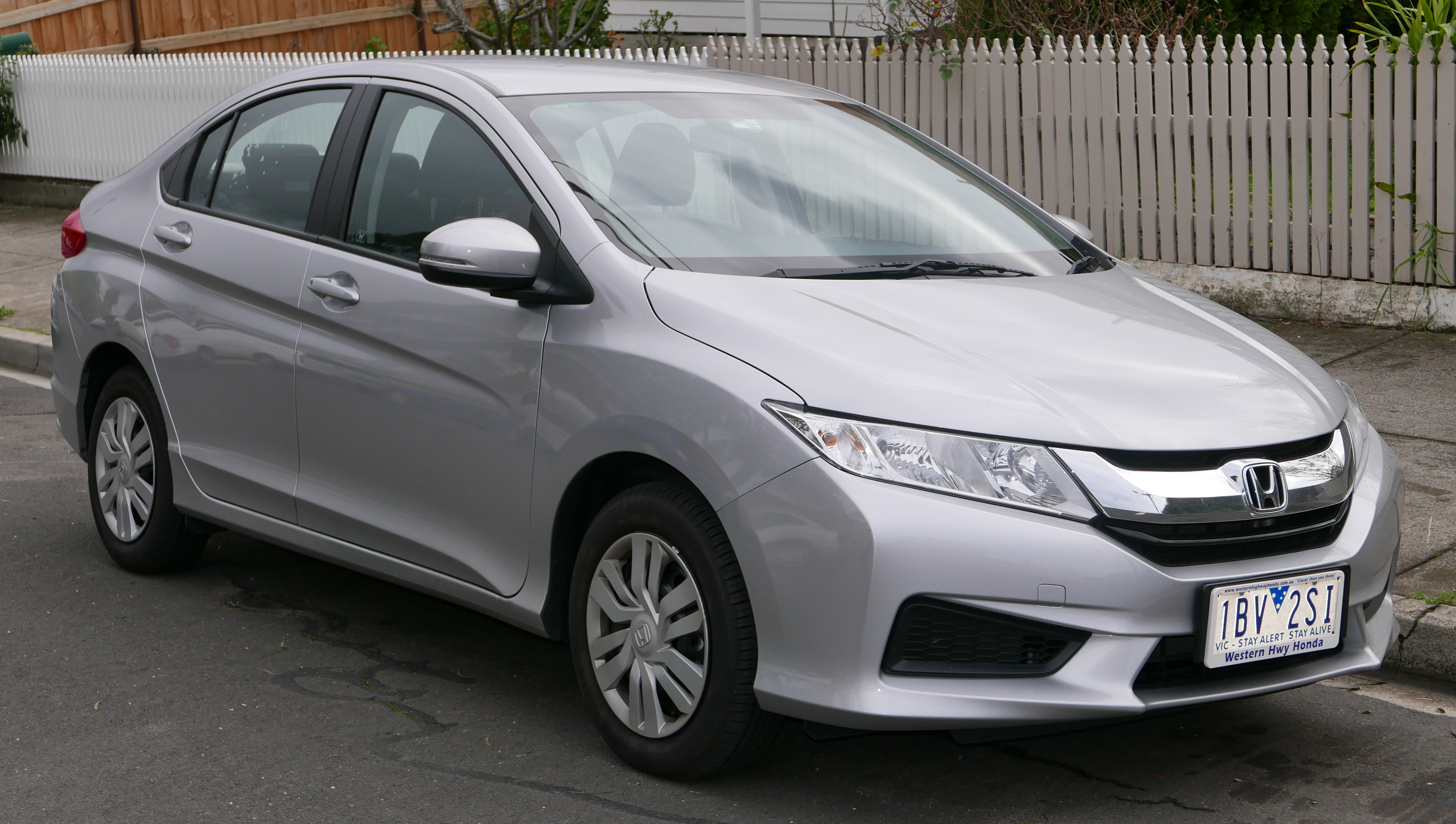
The Honda City is a fairly popular car in Vietnam.

Honda Vietnam is a joint venture of Honda and the Vietnam Engine and Agricultural Machinery Corporation (VEAM). It is the top selling motorcycle brand in Vietnam, and operates three motorcycle factories and one car factory in Vietnam.

=== Hyundai ===
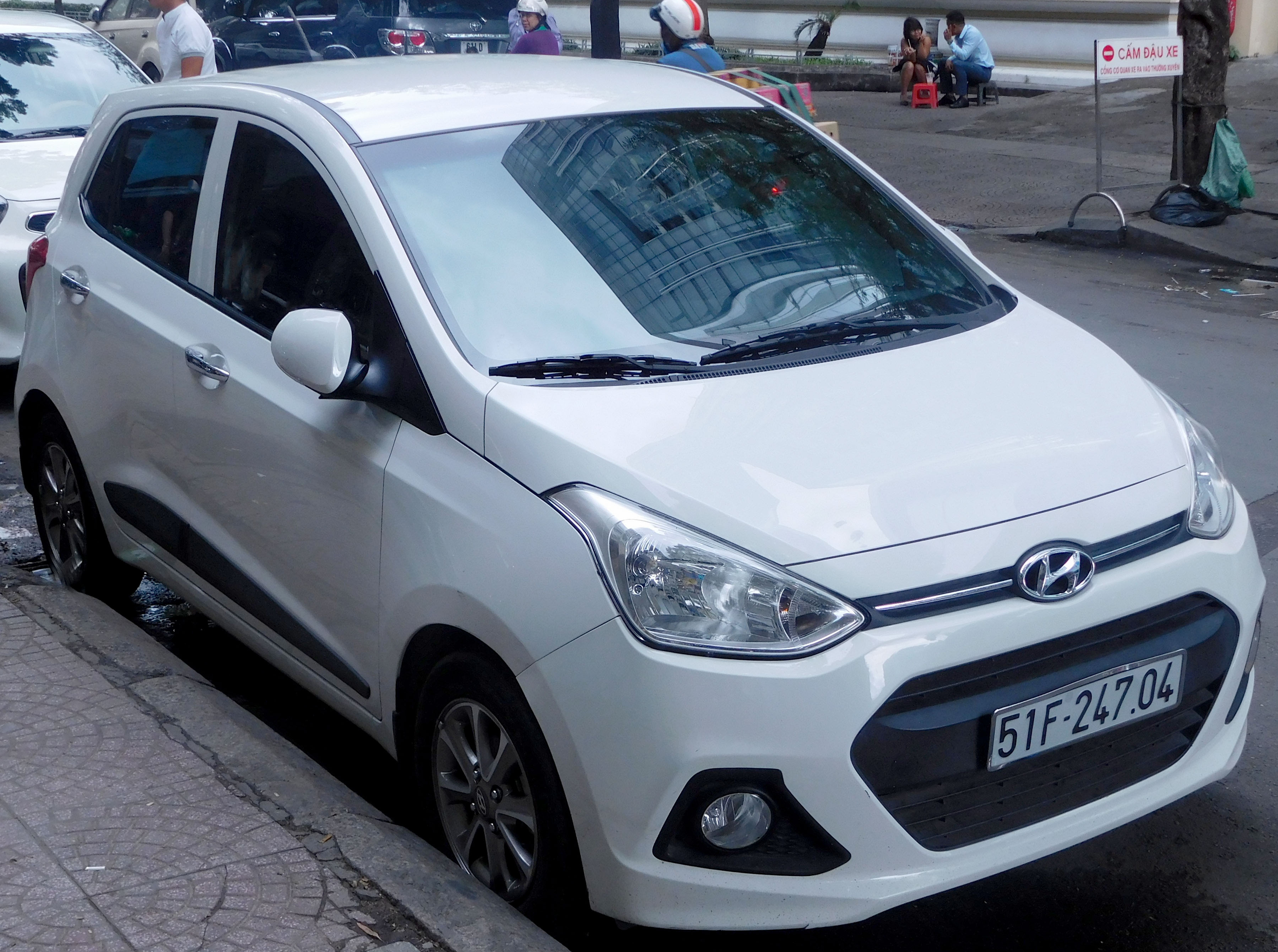
Vietnamese Hyundai i10

Hyundai models are manufactured from CKD kits by Hyundai Thanh Cong Auto, a joint venture between Hyundai and Vietnam's Thanh Cong Auto. Hyundai reportedly strongly considered building a manufacturing plant in Ninh Binh, to produce the Grand i10 model.

=== Kia ===
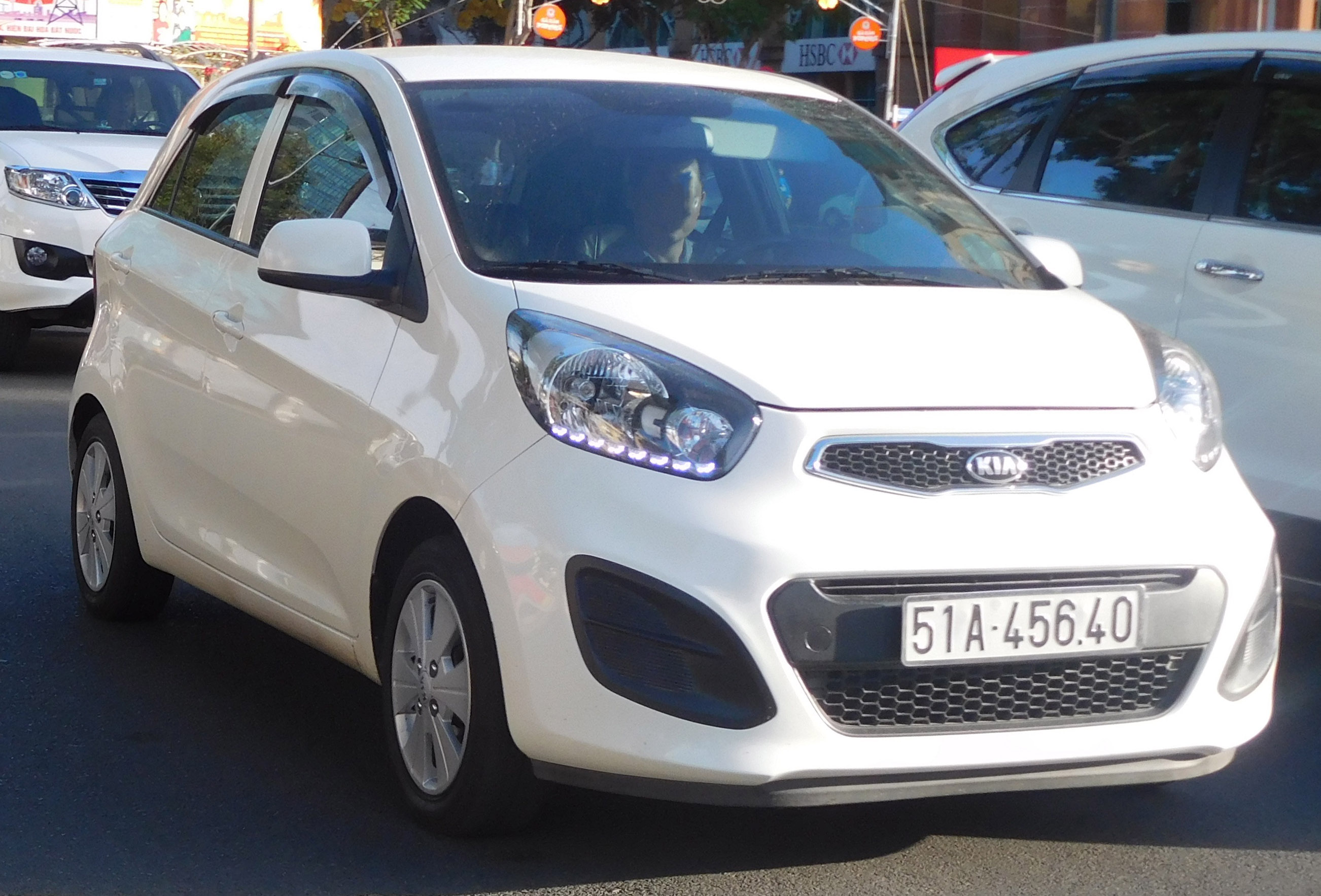
Vietnamese Kia Morning

Since 2008, Kia Motors vehicles are produced from CKD kits by THACO Kia, a joint venture with THACO, at a plant in Chu Lai. Models produced are the Kia Morning, Kia Sportage, Kia Sorento, Kia Carens.

=== Mazda ===
Through its joint venture with THACO, Vina Mazda Automobile Manufacturing, Mazda 2 models are produced at a plant in Nui Thanh. The plant has a production capacity of 10,000 vehicles per year and employs 300 workers.

=== Mitsubishi ===
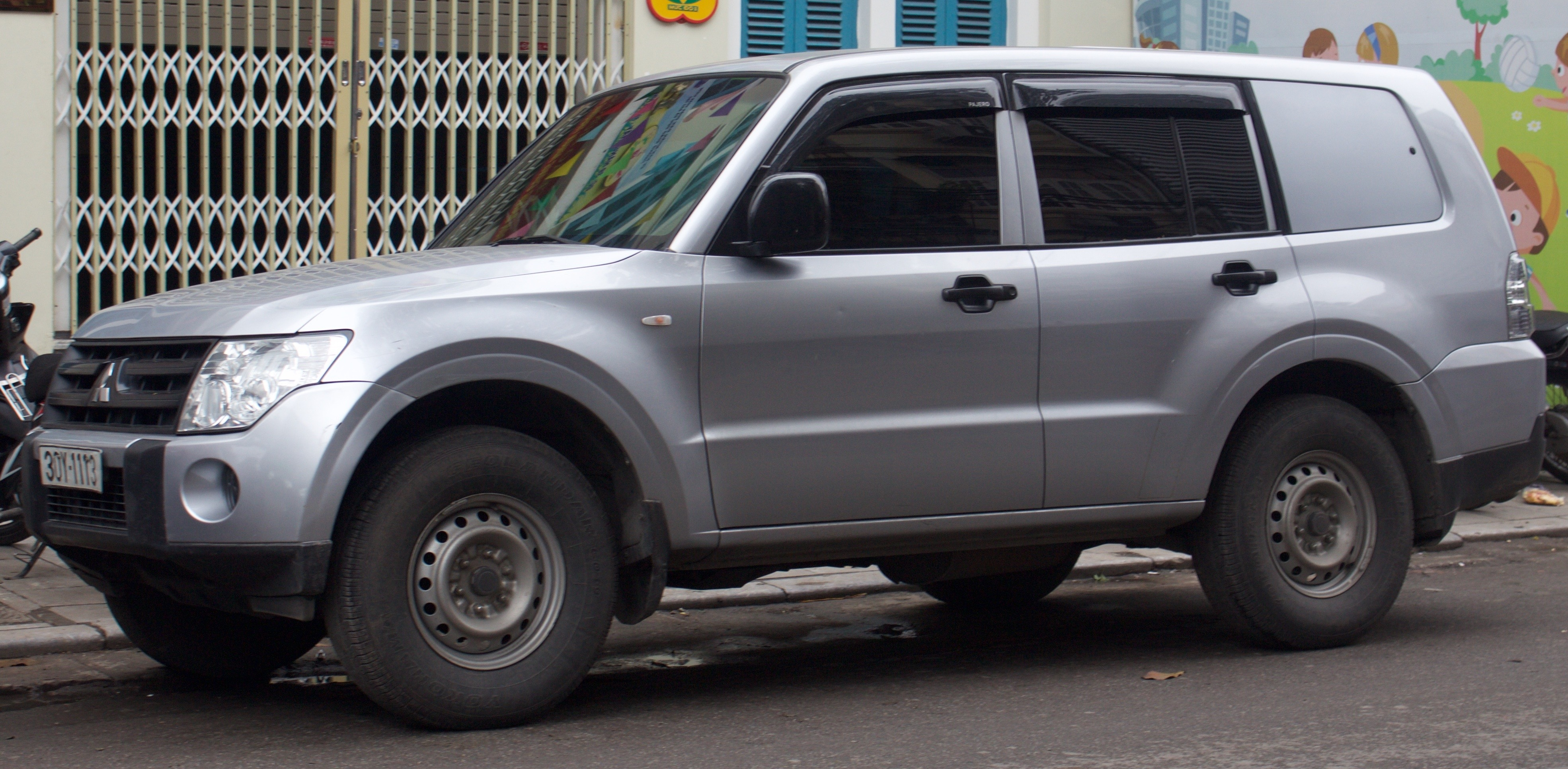
Vietnamese Mitsubishi Pajero security van

Mitsubishi Motors is active in Vietnam through its Vina Star Motors Corporation joint venture with Malaysian PROTON Holdings. In 1997 production of Mitsubishi vehicles was started with the Mitsubishi Delica van, with other vehicles being the Mitsubishi Pajero and Mitsubishi Canter.

=== Škoda ===
Škoda Auto started its operations in Vietnam since 2023, initially offering CBU models from Czech Republic like Karoq and Kodiaq only. In March 2025, Škoda Auto partnered with Thanh Cong Group to began local assembly of Slavia and Kushaq in their new plant in Quang Ninh province, using kits imported from India.

=== Suzuki ===
Suzuki builds cars in Vietnam through its Visuco subsidiary, operating in a factory in Bien Hoa, Dong Nai Province. The factory produces the Super Carry, Ertiga, Grand Vitara, Vitara and Swift, as well as the Impulse 125 Fi, Hayate 125, UA125-T, Viva 115 Fi, Raider 150 and Axelo 125 motorbikes. Annual production is 6000 motor vehicles and 100,000 motorbikes.

=== Toyota ===
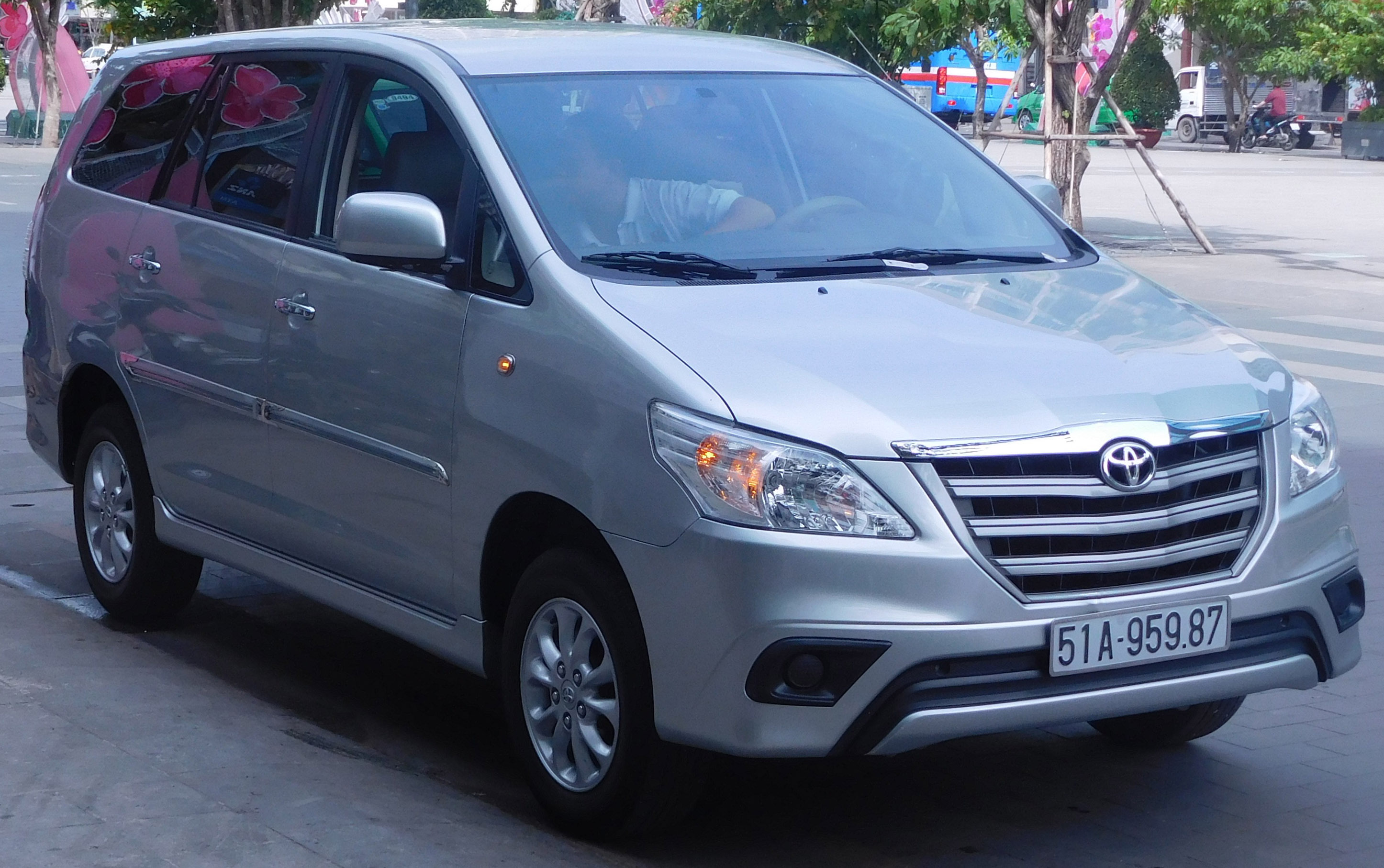
Toyota Innova

Toyota Motor Vietnam uses CKD kits to produce vehicles for the domestic market. Vehicles produced are the Vios, Avanza, Veloz, Fortuner and Innova. It produced 41,000 vehicles in 2017.

=== Mercedes-Benz ===
Daimler AG assembles various Mercedes-Benz models from CKD kits at its factory in Ho Chi Minh City. The first car assembled by Mercedes-Benz Vietnam was an E-Class in 1996. The factory is a joint venture with Sai Gon Mechanical Engineering Corporation. In 2017, the factory built 6,000 vehicles.

=== Peugeot ===
Peugeot opened a factory in 2019 at Quang Nam province to produce the Peugeot 3008 and Peugeot 5008 for domestic market through joint venture with THACO. Since 2020, the Peugeot 2008 is also assembled locally at THACO Chu Lai plant.

== Licensed production ==
SAMCO produces Hyundai buses under licence.

== Domestic brands ==
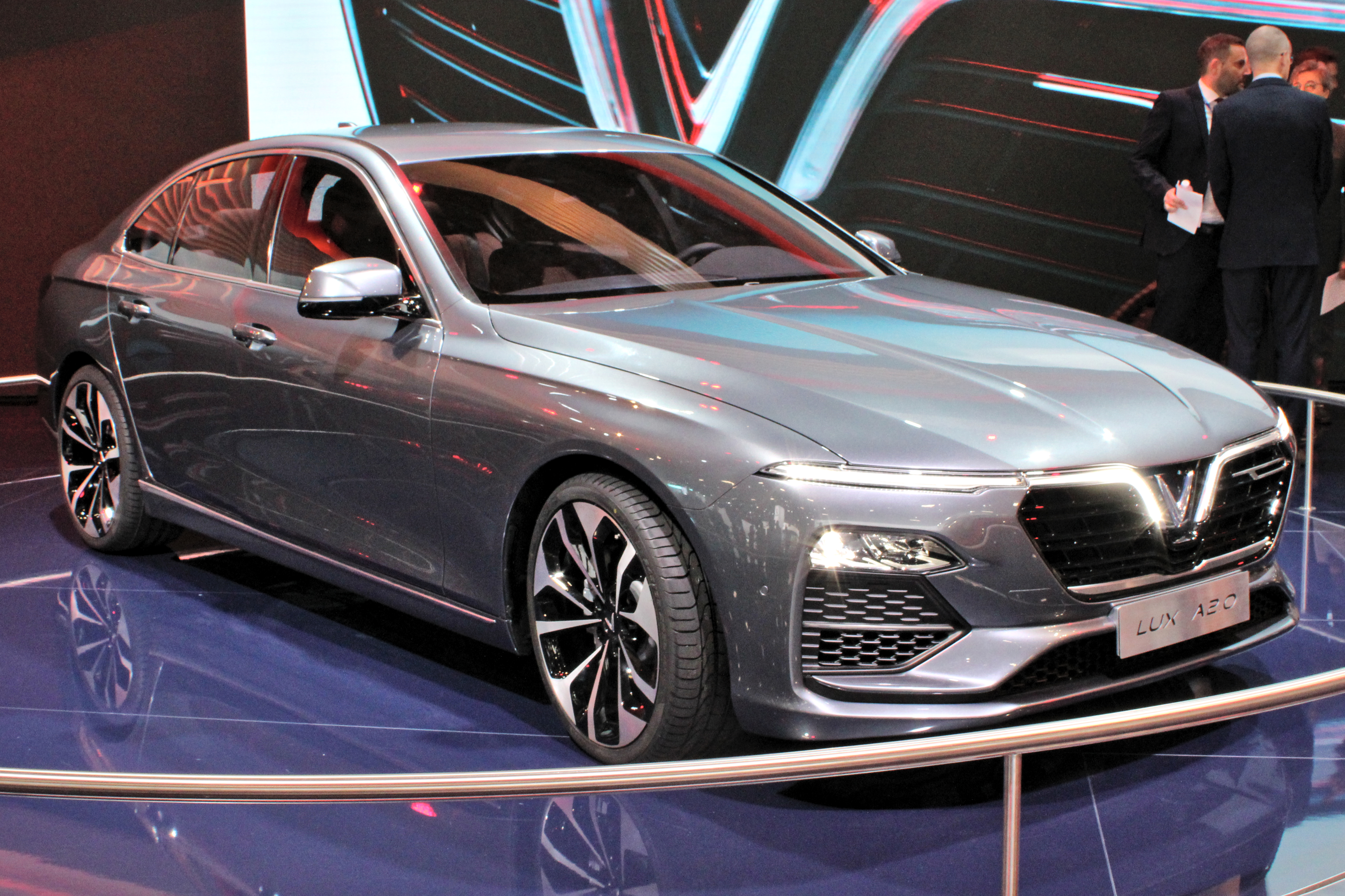
Vinfast Lux A2.0 Sedan at Paris Motor Show 2018

=== VinFast ===
VinFast is the first successful passenger vehicle brand in Vietnam. In August 2018, General Motors sold its Vietnamese operations to VinFast, granting the latter distribution rights of GM models in Vietnam, and transferring its Hanoi plant to VinFast. VinFast will use the plant to produce its own developed vehicles, in addition to the already planned plant in Haiphong. The current CEO of VinFast is Vingroup Founder and Chairman Phạm Nhật Vượng. VinFast also produce, electric cars and electric scooters.

Current VinFast product portfolio (car and buses only) includes

- VinFast VF e34/Nerio Green: B-segment (sub-compact) SUV for the Vietnamese market. The Nerio Green is a version of the VF e34 tailored to taxi companies and ride-hailing services.

- VinFast VF 3: Mini car for the Vietnamese market. 2-door with seatings for 5 people

- VinFast EC Van: blind small cargo van, based on the VF 3

- VinFast VF 5/Herio Green: A-segment (city car) SUV for the Vietnamese market. The Herio Green is a version of the VF5 tailored to taxi companies and ride-hailing services.

- VinFast VF 6: B-segment (sub-compact) SUV for the global market.

- VinFast VF 7: C-segment (compact) SUV for the global market

- VinFast VF 8: D-segment (mid-size) SUV for the global market

- VinFast VF 9: E-segment (full-size) SUV for the global market

- VinFast Minio Green: Mini car designed specifically for taxi companies and ride-hailing services.

- VinFast Limo Green: 7-seater mid-size MPV designed specifically for taxi companies and ride-hailing services.

- VinFast VF MPV 7: a version of the Limo Green more oriented towards normal consumers with more luxury than the Limo Green

- VinFast Lạc Hồng 900LX: a luxury version based on the VF 9, made in collaboration with INKAS. Comes in both armored (rated to German VPAM VR7 standards) and unarmored version.

- VinFast EB6: 6-meter city bus for the Vietnamese market

- VinFast EB8: 8-meter city bus for the Vietnamese and European market. Showed at Busworld 2025 and certified for sale in the European market

- VinFast Green/EB10: 10-meter city bus for the Vietnamese market. Currently operated by VinBus and other companies throughout Vietnam

- VinFast EB12: 12-meter city bus, first shown at Busworld 2025. Certified for sale in the European market

=== Kim Long Motor ===
Kim Long Motor, based in the Chan May-Lang Co Economic Zone in Hue, was founded in 2017 and specializes in commercial vehicles for the Vietnamese and export markets, in collaboration with Yuchai (technical transfer of engines), BYD (EV components) and Dongfeng DANA. Their first products, introduced in 2024 are the Kim Long 99 bus and the Kim Long X9 minibus. Now, the company has many products ranging from passenger buses, minivans, electric city bus, electric cargo van.

The current portfolio includes:

– Kim Long 99 full size bus, powered by Yuchai K11 engine (comes in 29-seat VIP seating, 47-seat normal seating, 22-cabin sleeper with lavatory, 24-cabin sleeper and 34-bed sleeper versions)

– Kim Long 99-G34 EV (34-bed sleeper) EV bus, with batteries and components from BYD

– Kim Long 29 29-seat mid-size bus, powered by Yuchai S07 engine

– Kim Long X9 minibus

– KIMAN 9 light trucks, powered by Yuchai YCY24110-58 engine (comes in 2-ton and 2.5-ton versions)

– Kim Long GK48 EV electric cargo van, with BYD batteries and EV components, up to 305 km range

== Former domestic brands ==
=== Vinaxuki ===
Vinaxuki produced light commercial vehicles. There were also plans for a small car which would have been Vietnam's first domestically developed passenger car, but the company went bankrupt and ceased operations in 2015. All efforts to revive the company and restart production have so far been unsuccessful.

=== La Dalat ===
La Dalat was a Citroën 2CV based car designed by French Citroën engineers based in Vietnam. 5,000 vehicles were produced between 1969 and 1975, making it the first car produced in Vietnam.

== Sales ==
In 2017, Toyota held the highest market share among passenger vehicle sales in Vietnam, at 23%.

Since 2013, the Toyota Vios is the bestselling car in Vietnam, followed by the Hyundai Accent and Hyundai Grand i10.

Year	Sales	Sales (passenger cars only)	Top selling brands	Reference
2016	271,833	159,500	1. Toyota (57,036); 2. Thaco Truck (43,787); 3. Thaco Kia (33,014)	
2017	250,619	146,994	1. Toyota (59,355); 2. Thaco Truck (38,023); 3. Ford (28,588)	
2018	276,817	229,706	1. Toyota (79,328); 2. Honda (33,102); 3. Thaco Mazda (32,731)	
2019	306,073	192,084	1. Toyota (65,856); 2. Thaco Mazda (32,728); 3. Thaco Kia (28,986)	
2020	283,983	215,908	1. Toyota (70,692); 2. Thaco Kia (39,180); 3. Thaco Mazda (32,224)	

^Note: Data from VAMA members only.

== See also ==
- Transport in Vietnam
- Automotive industry
- Automotive industry by country
- Motorcycle industry in Vietnam
- List of Asian automobile manufacturers
- List of countries by motor vehicle production
