= List of microcars by country of origin: V =

== List ==
Country	Automobile Name	Manufacturer	Engine Make/Capacity	Seats	Year	Other information
South Vietnam	La Dalat	Citroën Xe-Hoi Cong Ty, Saigon	Citroën 602 cc	2	1971–1975	Based on Citroën Méhari and using various Citroën mechanical elements
Vietnam	VinFast VF 3	VinFast	Electric motor	5	2024 -	
