= Motorcycle industry in Vietnam =

Part of Vietnam's automotive industry

Motorcycles, scooters, and mopeds are synonymous in Vietnam (in Vietnamese: xe máy). The motorcycle industry in Vietnam has been boosted in the 1990s due largely to foreign investment. Currently, Vietnam is considered the center of the motorcycle industry in Asia, with average annual sales of motorcycles in Vietnam reach 3 million units. The key players in the motorcycle industry include foreign brands: Honda, Yamaha, Piaggio, Suzuki, and SYM, and local producers of e-motorbikes: VinFast.

In recent years, the domestic motorcycle industry in Vietnam has faced challenges from the government's intention to reduce the number of motorcycles on the streets, the growing market of environmentally-friendly e-motorbikes, and expanding car ownership. The slowdown trends in the local motorcycle market growth have appeared. Under this trend, many motorcycle manufacturers turn to use Vietnam as a base of motorcycle production for exporting to other countries in and beyond the Asian region. In turn, the export industry has been particularly vulnerable to the COVID-19 induced lockdown and global economic decline.

At the same time, the motorcycle industry in Vietnam has drawn concerns from the public, the authority, and the academia. The most common worry is that motorcycle emission can worsen air quality and accelerate climate change. Studies have also shown that the persisting motorcycle dominance in transport could slow down the upgrading of urban facilities in accommodating four-wheel vehicles. Finally, the motorcycle taxi, one of the many occupations associating with the motorcycle industry, is seen as incompatible with the state's vision of urban modernity.

== History ==
While motorcycles were very much present in the roads of Vietnam since colonial times, the current motorcycle dominance on Vietnam's street is a relatively recent phenomenon. The motorcycle industry in Vietnam started to develop only after Vietnam embarked on the market reforms known as doi moi in 1986. Doi moi, therefore, marks a turning point in the development of motorcycle industry in Vietnam.

=== Pre Doi Moi ===
Up until the 1980s, bicycles remained the dominant form of transport on Vietnam's street. In those days, motorcycles were prohibitively expensive for the average person due to the shipping fee and import tariffs. A majority of these early motorcycles were European products.

==== 1950s ====
During the 1950s, most of the motorcycles in both the Democratic Republic of Vietnam ("North Vietnam") and the Republic of Vietnam ("South Vietnam") were imported from France.

One of the popular motorcycle brands in Vietnam during this period was the French-made Mobylette (also known as Moby) by the French manufacturer Motobecane. It had the highest speed of 64 km/h. Mobylette's cute exterior won many fans that Moby enthusiasts still remember it to this day.

==== 1960s and 1970s ====
The 1960s was called the Italian era, or the era of the European wave, with most of the motorcycles from Europe, particularly Italy. The Italian-made Lambrettas and Vespas ruled the streets of the Republic of Vietnam. These were typically European-style classy and functional designs.

The 1960s also saw the rising of Japan-made motorcycles in the Republic of Vietnam. In this period, the importation of Japan-made Honda motorcycles was subsidized by U.S. dollars to aid in the "nation-building efforts" of the Saigon-led government. Honda 67 and Honda Cubs were the most famous modes. These stylish Japanese motorcycles became popular among civil servants due to its affordability. In Saigon back then, Honda motorcycle was a sign of social status.

==== 1980s ====
After the end of the Second Indochina War and the Socialist Republic of Vietnam's increasing integration into the COMECON Eastern Economic Bloc, motorcycles from Italy and Japan were joined by motorcycles from the USSR (Minsk), GDR (Simson), and Czechoslovakia (Babetta)/JAWA).

Vietnamese who went abroad to the Eastern Bloc as part of the COMECON labour exchange scheme often arranged for the shipment of motorcycles back to Vietnam. For example, after 1977, the Democratic Republic of Vietnam started to dispatched workers to Czechoslovakia under the Vietnam -Czechoslovakia labor exchange scheme. After 3- to 5- year stays in Czechoslovakia, receiving training on industrial skills ranging from heavy industry to Chemical to food productions, these trainees would return to Vietnam as skilled workers. Along with their stays in Czechoslovakia, many of them saved money to buy the Babetta/JAWA mopeds. They shipped it back home since it was one of the best-selling motorcycles on the then Vietnamese market. In the 1980s, one can purchase a house in Vietnam by selling three Czechoslovakia-made Babetta mopeds.

=== Post Doi Moi ===
==== 1990s ====
The motorcycle industry in Vietnam started to develop in the early to mid-1990s when the government launched an import substitution policy of motorcycles by erecting trade barriers and providing incentives for foreign direct investment. During the period, both motorcycle production and motor parts production experienced a rise. Foreign companies and joint ventures were the major players at this stage, while local suppliers' participation was limited.

Foreign direct investment from Taiwan and Japan was the major booster behind the motorcycle industry's growth in Vietnam in this period. By the late 1990s, the major motorcycle companies in Vietnam included one Taiwanese transnational corporate (VMEP, a subsidiary of Taiwan's Sanyang Motors) and three Japanese transnational corporates (Suzuki, Honda, and Yamaha). These four brands have remained as the key players in Vietnam's motorcycle industry till today.

Besides foreign direct investment in motorcycle production, motor parts production in Vietnam was boosted in the 1990s by the influx of investments from Taiwan and Japan. These parts manufacturers followed the motorcycle companies to invest in Vietnam, producing parts including tires, batteries, electric parts, brakes, and plastic parts. There were 13 Taiwanese suppliers initially following Sanyang's entry to the Vietnamese market, while the number of Japanese parts suppliers was smaller.

In contrast, local suppliers' participation at this time was rather limited. Although there were numerous local companies producing replacement parts, they were outside the procurement networks of foreign motorcycle companies for two reasons. First, the foreign motorcycle companies were not compelled to increase the local content ratio at this stage. Second, the parts produced by local companies did not meet the quality standards of transnational corporates. Except for a limited number of state-owned machinery companies that started to produce parts for Honda Vietnam in the late 1990s, no local parts suppliers participated in the transnational corporates' procurement network. Throughout the 1990s, Japanese motorcycle companies in Vietnam depended primarily on parts produced in-house and imported from outside Vietnam, especially Thailand. As a result, the hoped-for promotion of local industrialization largely failed to materialize.

==== 2000s ====
Into the 2000s, the motorcycle industry in Vietnam experienced a big jump in both production and market scale. Honda was the leading brand in this trend and it still enjoys the largest market share in Vietnam today.

This sudden surge of motorcycles in Vietnam was the result of rapid economic expansion that happened in the country after Doi Moi. According to the National Traffic Safety Committee, the number of motor vehicles in Vietnam grew from half a million in the 1990s to almost 14 million at the end of 2004. Motorcycles played an essential role in Vietnamese daily life due to its mobility to transfer people and goods. People drove motorcycles to travel around the city from door to door.

In this period, Honda motorcycles could be found in every street of Vietnam. Three typical Honda modes of from this period were Honda Spacy, Honda Win, and Honda Dream.

- The Honda Dream was a reproduction and upgrade of the Honda Cub that was popular in the South during the 1960s.
- The Honda Win was sturdier and more durable that it was a popular choice for riding up the mountainous region in the North. However, its market was challenged by the Chinese-made imitations in a lower price.
- The Honda Spacy was particularly popular among young females because it had storage space for a handbag. It was the only motorcycle at that time which had this function. Thus, Honda Spacy was considered to provide mobility to women who otherwise would be confined to domestic affairs.

== Domestic industry ==
Vietnam is regarded as the centre of the motorcycle industry in Asia. Since 2010, the average annual sales of motorcycles in Vietnam have reached 3 million units. Although motorcycle sales have remained a significant part of the market, a trend of slowdown has already emerged. The leader in this segment, the local brand VinFast, is now the third-largest player in the market, with annual sales exceeding 100,000 units.

Notably, while they have struggled to gain a foothold in the emerging e-scooter market, Japanese motorcycle manufacturers still dominate the landscape.

At least three factors contribute to this new dynamic in the motorcycle industry in Vietnam: 1) the government's intention to reduce the number of motorcycles on the streets; 2) the growing market for environmentally friendly e-motorbikes; and 3) the increasing rates of car ownership in the country.

=== Government's intention to reduce motorcycles on streets ===
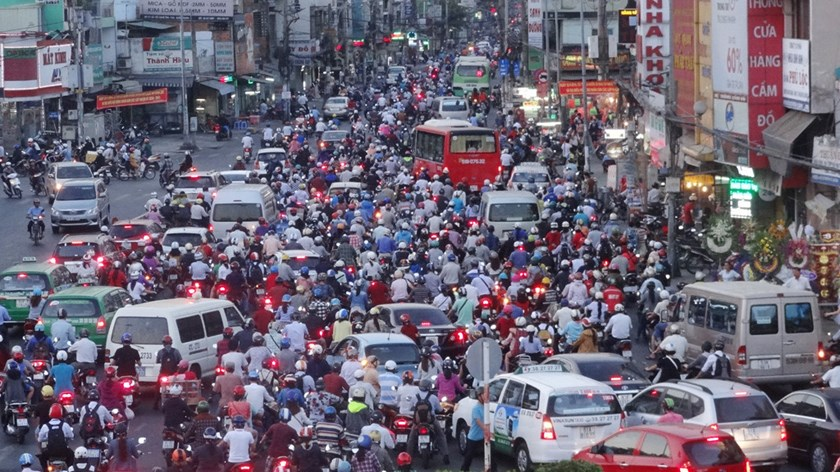
Motorcycles on Vietnam's street

One reason for the drop in motorcycle sales is the government's attempt to clear motorcycles on the streets. This is because the numerous motorcycles, resulting in traffic congestion, air pollution, fatal accidents, and other significant consequences.

Following the line, in 2017, Hanoi city authority approved a plan to ban the motorcycles that swarm its streets by 2030 in an attempt to reduce traffic jams and pollution. Ho Chi Minh city authority, though decided not to ban motorcycles, approved a project "Strengthening public transport in combination with controlling motor vehicles in Ho Chi Minh City" in 2018 to restrict motorcycles from entering the central districts of the city.[2]

=== Government's preference for e-motorbikes ===
Besides, the government presents a preference towards the environmental-friendly e-motorbikes. However, no serious efforts have been enabled toward this end before the arrival of the COVID-19 pandemic.

Nevertheless, the sales of e-motorbikes perform relatively well in recent years.

VinFast is the champion in the local e-motorbike market. It is a sub-corporate of VinGroup, which was founded in 2017. The company produces only electric vehicles in the two and four-wheelers. With only two-year existence, VinFast has doubled its sales from 2019 to 2020 and is building a new plant.

=== Impacts of the COVID-19 pandemic ===
Furthermore, in 2020, the pandemic has hit the motorcycle industry. The lockdown and the consequent economic decline have impacted motorcycles' sales.

=== Expanding car ownership ===
In recent years, the growing car ownership in Vietnam is also viewed to have post challenges on the motorcycle industry. Studies have concluded that the increasing car market results from economic development and the weakened role of motorcycles as a sign of social distinction.

In the late 1970s and 1980s, the motorcycle was a sign of social status in Vietnam because it was expensive and exclusive for those wealthy and resourceful families. However, more than three decades after the economic reform, Vietnam has been through a steady economic growth that significantly enhances the affordability of motorcycles among ordinary people. Meanwhile, the expansion of the motorcycle industry in the 1990s under inflows of foreign investment resulting in a larger availability of motorcycles in the market. In nowadays Vietnam, almost every household owns at least one motorbike. The massive ownership represents a normalization of motorcycles in Vietnamese society. As a result, motorbikes have changed from an aspirational and positional good to a mere mode of transport.

In contrast, cars are now a new sign of social status due to its exclusiveness. Since the late 2000s, cars have been increasingly available in the market thanks to the state development strategy promoting automobiles as a spearhead industry. Unlike motorbikes, which can be made cheaper to win a price war, car sales have to uphold a much higher price to recover the production costs. The increasing availability yet high price allows the middle-class to purchase cars while restricting this accessibility to this class and those in above. These two characteristics enable cars to be interpreted as a new symbol of the middle class.

Under this assumption of cars as a new symbol of social status, many relatively well-off Vietnamese now have greater interests to purchase a car. In particular, they tend to use cars instead of motorcycles on informal occasions to demonstrate their identity as a successful person.

== Export industry ==
Vietnam is not only a significant motorcycle producer but also a major motorcycle exporter in the region. In 2020, as the COVID-19 pandemic caused the economic decline globally, the export sales of Vietnam-made motorcycles also fell.

VinFast, the local e-motorbikes producer, has also followed the lead with its initiative to go global by 2022.

== Local and foreign motorcycle brands ==
=== Local brands ===
VinFast

VinFast was founded in 2017 as a member of VinGroup. It is the largest Vietnamese producer of electric vehicles, including e-motorbikes.

=== Foreign brands ===
Vietnam has been an attractive destination for foreign motorcycle manufacturers.

Japan

- Honda

Honda set up its first plant in Phuc Thang, Vinh Phuc Province in 1998. The second one in the same area in 2008. The latest one was built in 2014 in Ha Nam Province.

- Suzuki
- Yamaha

Its plant locates in the Thang Long industrial area of Hanoi, responsible for engine components production.

Taiwan

- San Yang Motor (SYM)

SYM established its subsidiary in Vietnam in 1993, called Vietnam Manufacturing & Export Processing (VMEP). SYM also has a plant in the Bien Hoa area.

Germany

- BMW

Belarus

- Minsk

South Korea

- Daelim (DMC)

Italy

- Piaggio/Vespa

== Concerns regarding the motorcycle industry ==
=== Air pollution ===
The motorcycle industry in Vietnam has often been blamed for causing air pollution. Since 2012, many studies have connected the worsened air condition in Vietnam with its constantly increasing number of motorcycles. In the flowing years, the central government, as well as the city authorities of the two most populated cities in Vietnam – Hanoi and Ho Chi Minh promulgated a series of policies aiming to reduce the number of motorcycles or to restrict the emission of motor vehicles.

In 2015, the Vietnamese government announced the target to shift 100% motorized two-wheelers park from internal combustion engines (ICEs) to electric vehicles (EVs) by 2030. It was a part of the government's attempt to combat air pollution and reduce Green House Gas Pollution caused by the horning motorcycles on the streets.

Despite all these new regulations and schemes, changes have yet to come. Into 2021, the air pollution index in Ho Chi Minh City continues to be at the Unhealthy Level according to the ASEAN standard.

=== Infrastructure construction ===
Another concern on the motorcycle industry stems from its precise influences on city infrastructures and urban planning. In large cities, the chronic lack of transport infrastructure, such as inadequate road space, limited numbers of traffic lights, have caused severe traffic congestion. Studies have indicated that this road design has to do with the dominance of motorcycle transport in Vietnam.

Research shows that two conditions significantly stimulate motorbike use in transport: 1) high population density nearby home; 2) immigrants new to the location. Both Hanoi and Ho Chi Minh are highly populated cities, with the population per square mile at 5,900 and 10,610. Meanwhile, both cities absorb a large number of migrants. According to the 2015 National Internal Migration Survey, respective 0.4 and 0.5 percent of the population aged 15–59 had arrived in the city less than 12 months prior to the survey, ranking the 1st and 2nd as single city figures.[3]

Studies discovered that this dominance of motorcycles on streets had sunk the eagerness to upgrade road conditions in coping with the increasing car presence on the street. One reason is that though car ownership is rising, many people use cars or motorcycles depending on occasions instead of completely getting rid of motorcycles. The built infrastructure was designed to suit motorcycle transport and thus, has reduced the necessity to make a change.[9] Besides, a bulk of efforts are needed to accommodate cars due to the differences in space required. For example, the street space required cars are much larger than that of motorcycles. Thus, cars cannot travel through numerous narrow alleys around the cities. In addition, the parking lots for motorcycles are significantly smaller than that of cars. The former motorcycle parking areas are not enough to accommodate car parking.

=== Urban modernity ===
Urban modernity is also a concern around the motorcycle industry. Favoring the four-wheel vehicles, the government sees the motorcycle as a slow-mobility and less-productive form of transport. They consider motorcycles to detract from the state's vision of a clean, organized, modern urban space. This preference towards cars has impacted the considerable number of motorcycle taxis (in Vietnamese: xe ôm) in the cities. Many studies have examined the interaction between the state and motorcycle taxi drivers, representing the conflict of interest to beautify the urban scene and defend one's livelihood.

While the state tries to enforce regulations and fines to clear motorcycle taxis on streets, motorcycle taxi drivers develop tactics to avoid being caught or fined by the traffic policies. For example, immediate information about the new police stops is shared among drivers to help each other reroute and avoid being pulled over by the traffic police. Moreover, motorcycle taxi drivers learn to perform a particular identity, such as too poor to pay the fine or a retired soldier who struggles for life. In doing so, they increase the chance to avoid fines when being pulled over by traffic police.

== See also ==
- Transport in Vietnam
- Automotive industry in Vietnam

== Notes ==
- [1] In 2014, there were more than 43 million registered motorcycles in Vietnam.
- [2] The level of restriction on motorcycles in Ho Chi Minh city is ambiguous. In March 2019, the city authority announced not to ban motorcycles on streets but to restrict its entrance to certain districts. However, in April 2019, local editorial inclined to see that this restriction would turn into a banning regulation.
- [3] National Internal Migration Survey is conducted by the General Statistics Office of Vietnam every five years since 2015. The latest one is supposed to conduct in 2020, but the findings have not yet been released online.
- [4] Compare to cars and other vehicles, motorbikes typically have lower upfront costs and require less maintenance. This is the main reason why there are still so many motorbikes in Vietnam.
