= VinFast EC Van =

Overview
- Manufacturer: VinFast
- Production: 2025–present
- Assembly: Vietnam: Cát Hải, Haiphong

Body and chassis
- Class: Light commercial vehicle
- Body style: 3-door van
- Layout: Rear-motor, rear-wheel drive
- Related: VinFast VF 3

Powertrain
- Power output: 40 hp (30 kW; 41 PS)
- Battery: 17 kWh (usable capacity)

Dimensions
- Wheelbase: 2,520 mm (99.2 in)
- Length: 3,767 mm (148.3 in)
- Width: 1,680 mm (66.1 in)
- Height: 1,790 mm (70.5 in)

The VinFast EC Van (E-City Van) is a mini 2 seats electric cargo van for urban deliveries produced and introduced by VinFast (member of Vingroup) introduced in 2025.

== Specifications ==
The VinFast EC Van had sizes 3,767 x 1,680 x 1,790 mm, wheelbase 2,520 mm.

- ABS
- EBD
- TCS
- ESS

== Receptions ==
The VinFast EC Van is arrangring to deliver to end user in November 2025.

== Gallery ==
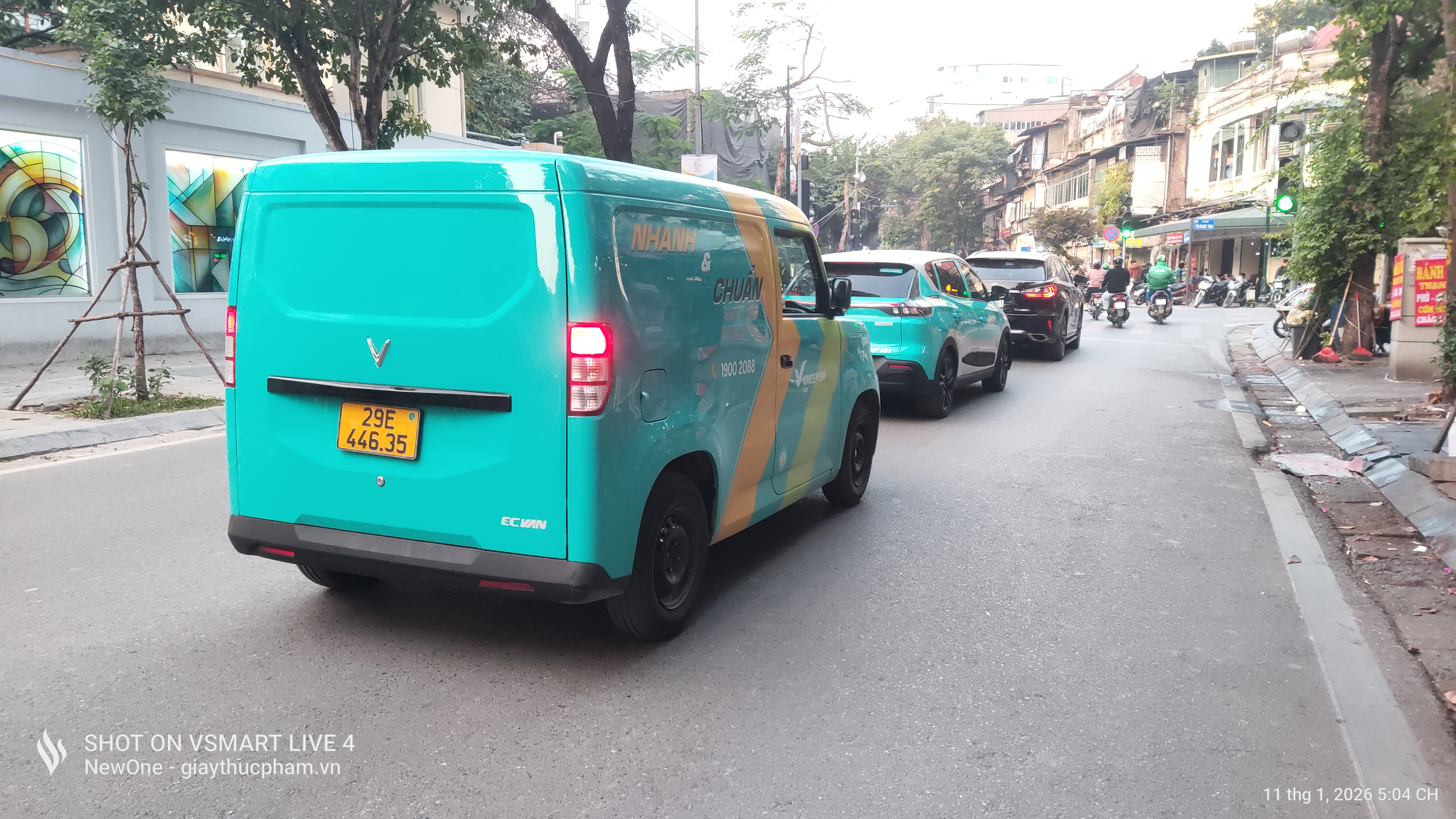
Xanh SM's VinFast EC Van in Hanoi, 2026

== See also ==
- BYD M3
- BYD E-Vali
- Chevrolet BrightDrop
- Dongfeng EV400
- Hyundai ST1
- Kia PV5
- Tesla Robovan
- Renault FlexEVan
- Rivian EDV
- Wuling E10 EV
- Wuling Yangguang
