= Babetta =

Slovak moped

Babetta 207

Babetta 210

The Babetta or Jawa Babetta was a series of mopeds built in Czechoslovakia / Slovakia and commonly marketed under the Jawa name in other countries. It had a 50cc two-stroke engine, a 1-speed or a 2-speed automatic transmission and reached 25–50 km/h (15–30 mph) depending on the model and year. They were produced in Považská Bystrica and later in Kolárovo, Rajec and Veľký Meder.

Originally the Babetta was conceived as a lightweight moped to compete with the VéloSoleX (Solex) moped which was popular during the 1960s. The first Babetta mopeds type 28 (later called the type 228) to see the light of day featured large 19-inch wheels, but these would be swapped out in favour of smaller 16-inch wheels in future models. The model 28 was mass-produced from 1971 until 1973 with an initial batch of 100 units in 1970. The Babetta was notable for its electronic ignition – the first time a transistorized contactless ignition had been used in a moped.

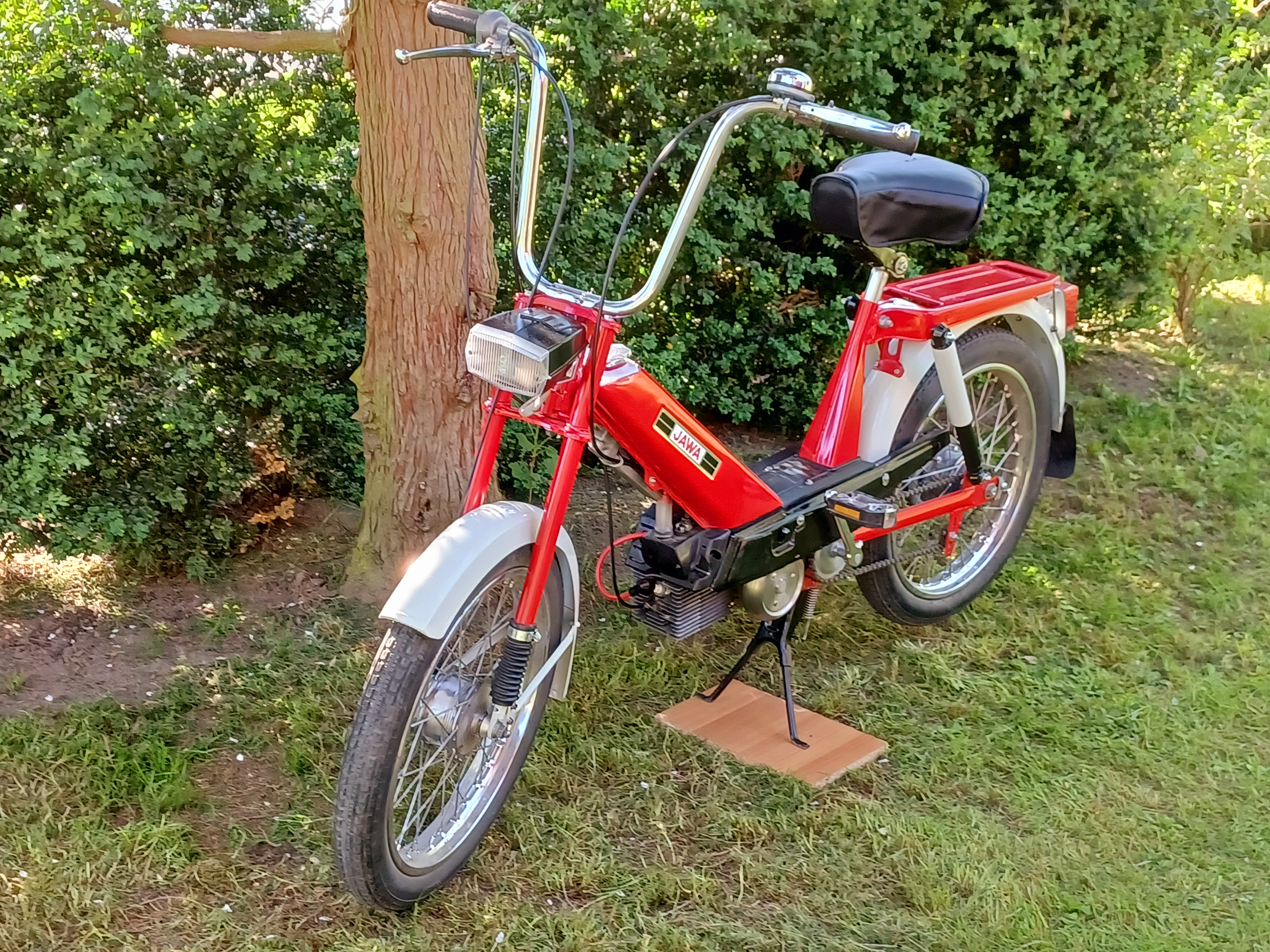
Babetta 207

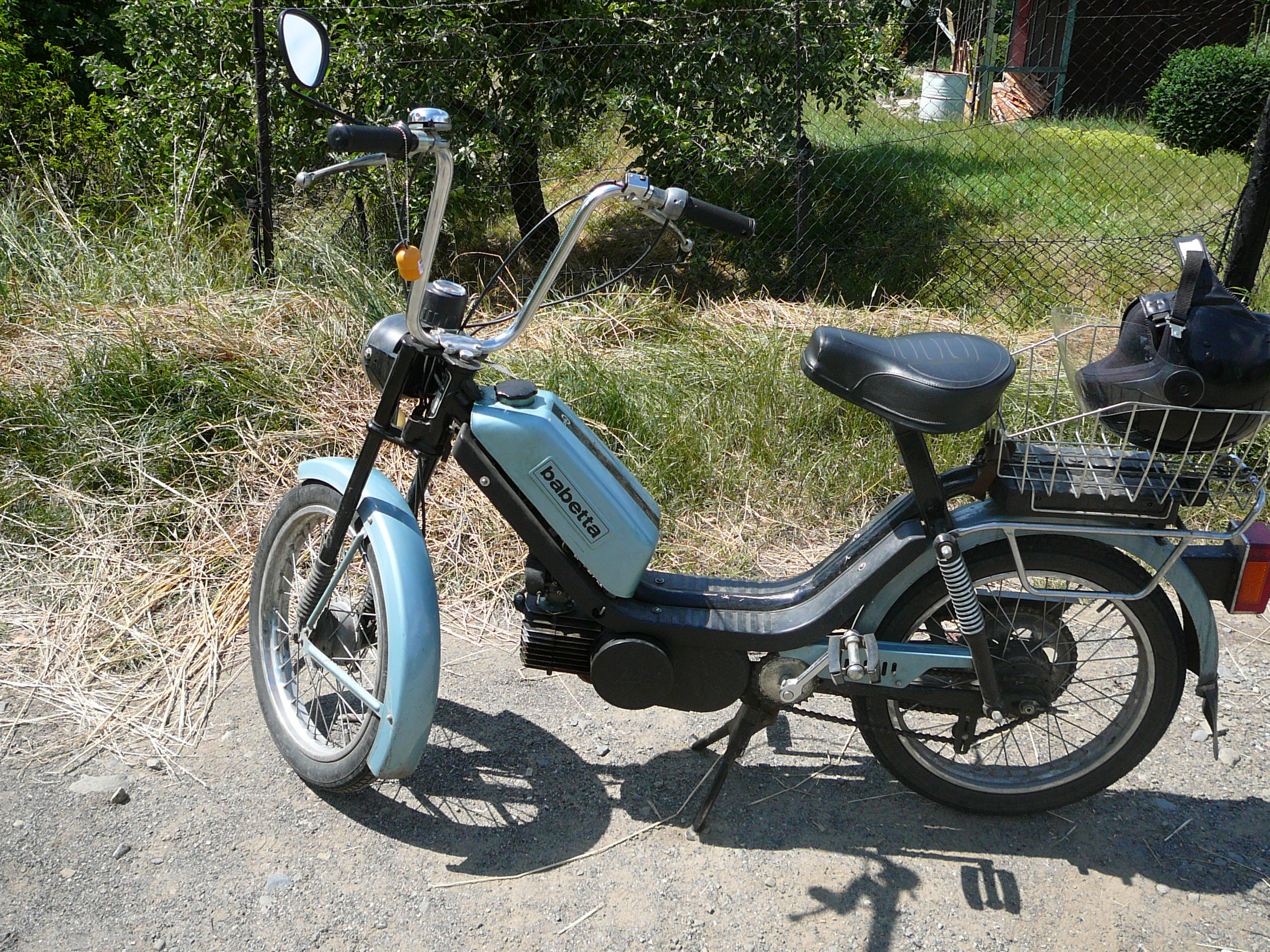
Babetta 210

The type 206 was a modified type 28 with smaller 16 inch wheels produced in the years 1971–1972, mainly for Germany. Engine power was reduced to 1 kW and top speed was limited to 25 km/h and at the time no driver's license was required for this Babetta.

A new model: the Babetta 207 was presented in 1972. The type 207 had a more powerful engine on some models, but it otherwise it had the same general design as the type 206. In 1975 the Babetta 207 received an updated tail design with rear suspension along with other minor tweaks.

In 1983 the original models were replaced by the new model 210. It featured a new engine and a 2-speed transmission, which was later swapped in favour of a 1-speed because of its unreliability. There were later many models based on the Babetta 210, some of which were produced until 1997.

In the first half of the 1990s, sales and exports gradually began to decline. By cooperation with a moped production plant in Latvia, originated Babetta 134 Stella (1989–1997). The Latvian company later went bankrupt and Babetta produced all components for the Stella. The last sold model was the Babetta 193 Sting, which was produced in 1999. Only 100 of these mopeds were made.

By 1999, the production of all Babetta models were discontinued. On the remains of the company in Kolárovo was founded a new company: Sting 2000 s.r.o., it has all production documentation for the babetta mopeds and produces spare parts for the Babetta mopeds.
