= BYD E-Vali =

Battery electric light commercial vehicle

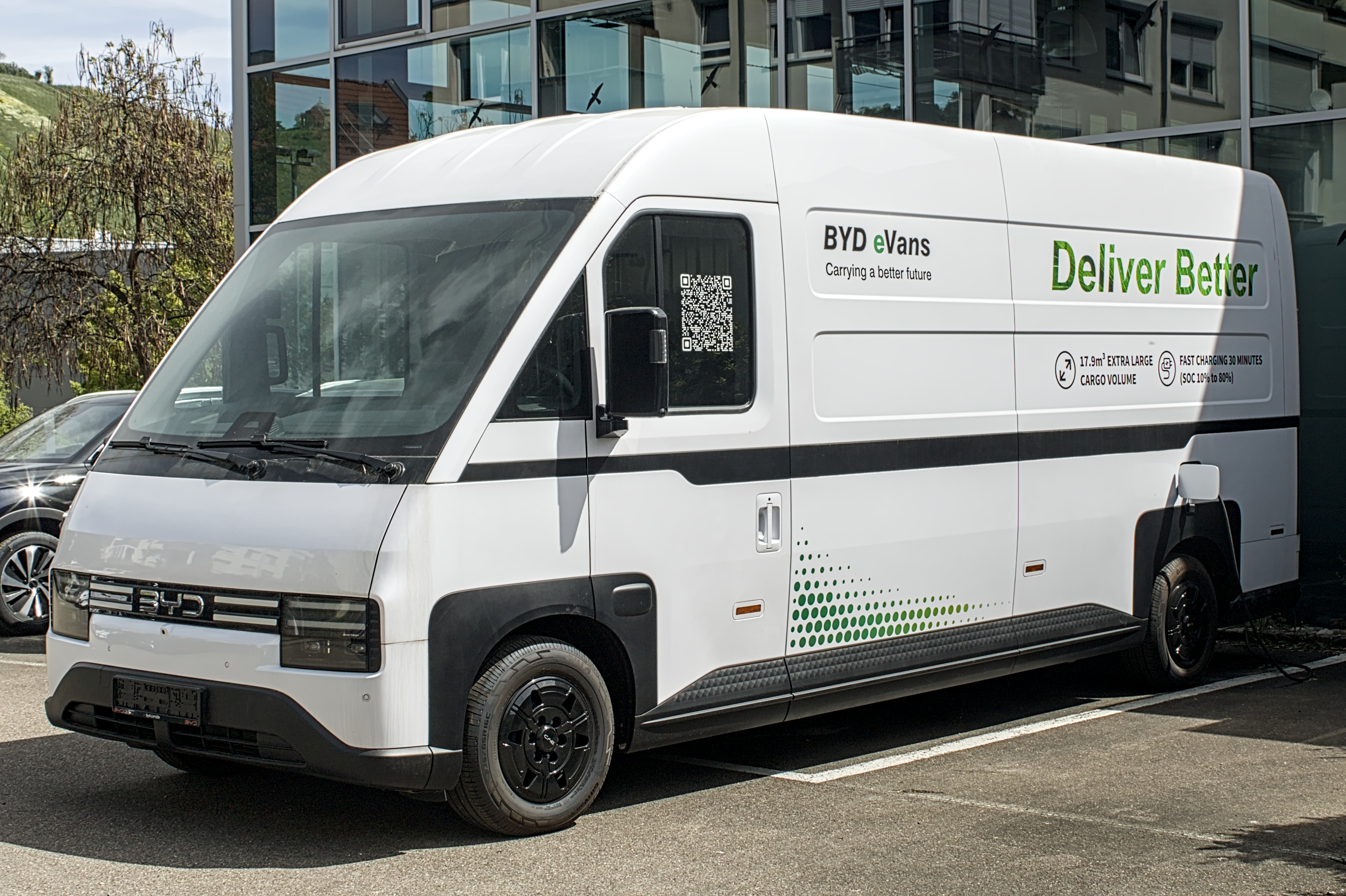

Overview
- Manufacturer: BYD Auto
- Production: 2025–present
- Assembly: China: Zhengzhou; Xi'an
- Designer: Under the lead of Wolfgang Egger

Body and chassis
- Class: Light commercial vehicle
- Body style: 4-door van
- Layout: Rear motor, rear-wheel drive; Dual-motor, all-wheel drive

Powertrain
- Electric motor: Permanent magnet synchronous

Dimensions
- Wheelbase: 3,865–4,550 mm (152.2–179.1 in)
- Length: 5,995–6,995 mm (236.0–275.4 in)
- Width: 2,096 mm (82.5 in)
- Height: 2,780 mm (109.4 in)
- Kerb weight: 3,500–4,200 kg (7,716.2–9,259.4 lb)

The BYD E-Vali is a battery electric light commercial vehicle manufactured by BYD Auto.

== History ==
The BYD E-Vali made its debut at the IAA Motor Show in Hanover, Germany, in September 2024. It is a large delivery van designed specifically for the European market. Sales will start in early 2025 in selected countries in Europe.

The E-Vali took the form of a large, single-body van with a large front window and a large glazed passenger compartment. The front fascia gained characteristic, low-set lighting. In the interior, the vehicle is equipped with two displays: a digital instrument cluster and a central touchscreen multimedia system display.

The E-Vali is offered with two length variants. The shorter one, with a body length of less than 6 meters, gained a load capacity of 700 kg (1,543 lb) and 13.9 m^{3} (491 cu ft) of transport space. The larger, 7-meter-long model gained a 1,450 kg (3,197 lb) payload and 17.9 m^{3} (632 cu ft) of cargo space.

== Specifications ==
The BYD E-Vali is available with a fully electric drive system in two variants. The basic 203 hp has rear-wheel drive, and the top 340 hp offers AWD. The 80.64 kWh battery has an electric range of approximately 220–240 kilometres (137–149 mi) on a single charge. The model supports up to 188 kW of DC fast charging, allowing it to replenish from 10 to 80% of the battery state in 30 minutes.

== Safety ==
Euro NCAP test results BYD E-Vali (2025)
Test	Score
Overall:	5 /5 stars
Safe driving	75%
Crash avoidance	91%
Post crash	80%

== See also ==
- List of BYD Auto vehicles
