= Sai Gon Mechanical Engineering Corporation =

Samco
- Industry: automobiles
- Founded: 1975; 50 years ago in Ho Chi Minh City, Vietnam
- Headquarters: Ho Chi Minh City, Vietnam
- Area served: Vietnam
- Revenue: 26,490,723 million VND
- Owner: State-owned by Vietnamese government
- Number of employees: 7,213
- Website: www.samco.com.vn

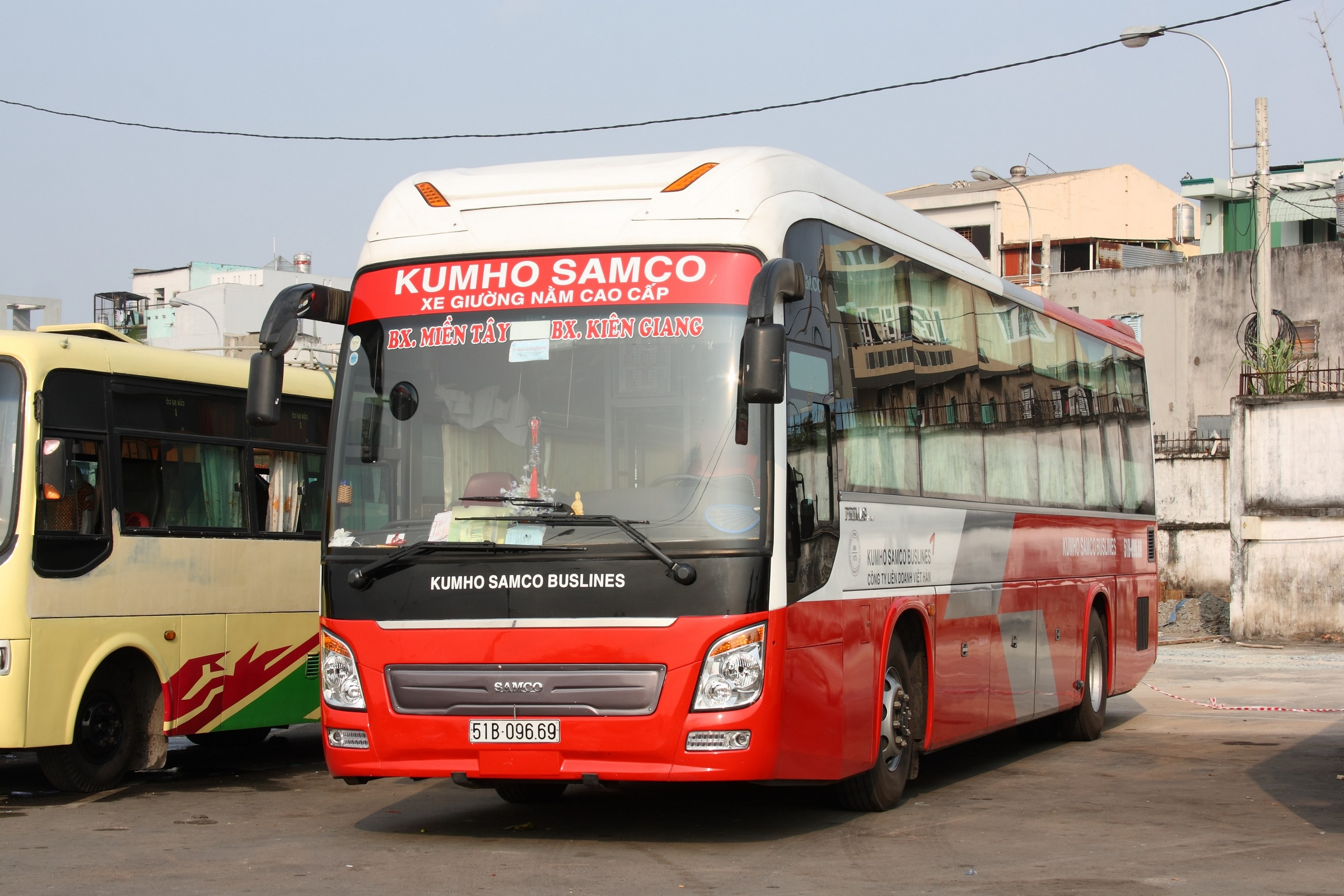
Samco sleeper bus in Vietnam

Samco (Sai Gon Mechanical Engineering Corporation, Vietnamese: Tổng công ty Cơ khí Giao thông vận tải Sài Gòn) is a Vietnamese state-owned manufacturer of automobiles, buses and automobile spare parts, as well as a builder of commercial and emergency vehicle bodies. The company was established in 1975 as the Đô Thành factory, to produce parts for transportation vehicles.

== Subsidiaries ==
- Kumho Samco lines, providing bus services in southern Vietnam
