= VinFast VF 7 =

Electric compact crossover SUV

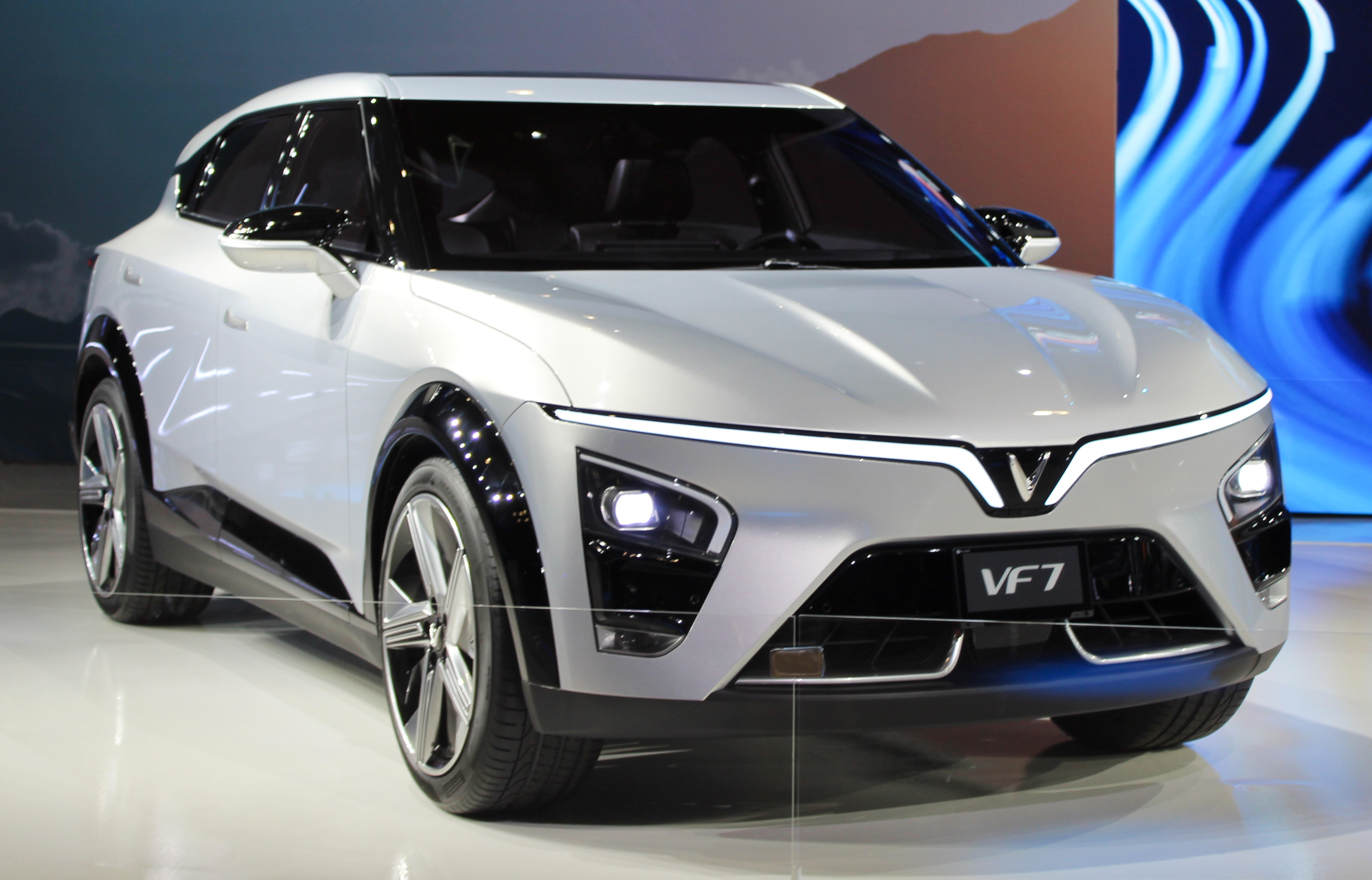
- VinFast VF7

Overview
- Manufacturer: VinFast
- Production: 2024-present
- Assembly: Vietnam: Cát Hải (VinFast Trading and Production LLC, Hai Phong Plant); India: Thoothukudi, Tamil Nadu (VinFast India)
- Designer: Lee Jae Hoon & Torino Design

Body and chassis
- Class: Compact SUV (C-segment)
- Body style: 5-door crossover SUV
- Layout: Front-motor, front-wheel-drive (VF 7 Eco); Dual-motors, all-wheel drive (VF 7 Plus)
- Platform: VinFast VMG-C/D

Powertrain
- Electric motor: single or dual Permanent magnet Motor(s)
- Power output: 150 kW (201 hp; 204 PS) (Eco FWD); 260 kW (349 hp; 354 PS) (Plus AWD)
- Battery: 75.3 kWh lithium ion (EV)

Dimensions
- Wheelbase: 2,840 mm (111.8 in)
- Length: 4,545 mm (178.9 in)
- Width: 1,890 mm (74.4 in)
- Height: 1,636 mm (64.4 in)

The VinFast VF 7 is an electric compact SUV (C-segment) manufactured and marketed by VinFast of Vingroup.

== Overview ==
The VF 7 was first introduced to the public in January 2022 along with the VF 5 and VF 6 at the Consumer Electronics Show (CES). It was designed by Lee Jae Hoon, a senior exterior designer for General Motors. VinFast launched a pre-order campaign for the VF 7 from 2–30 December 2022 in the local Vietnamese market, with the first deliveries to domestic customers on March 30, 2024.

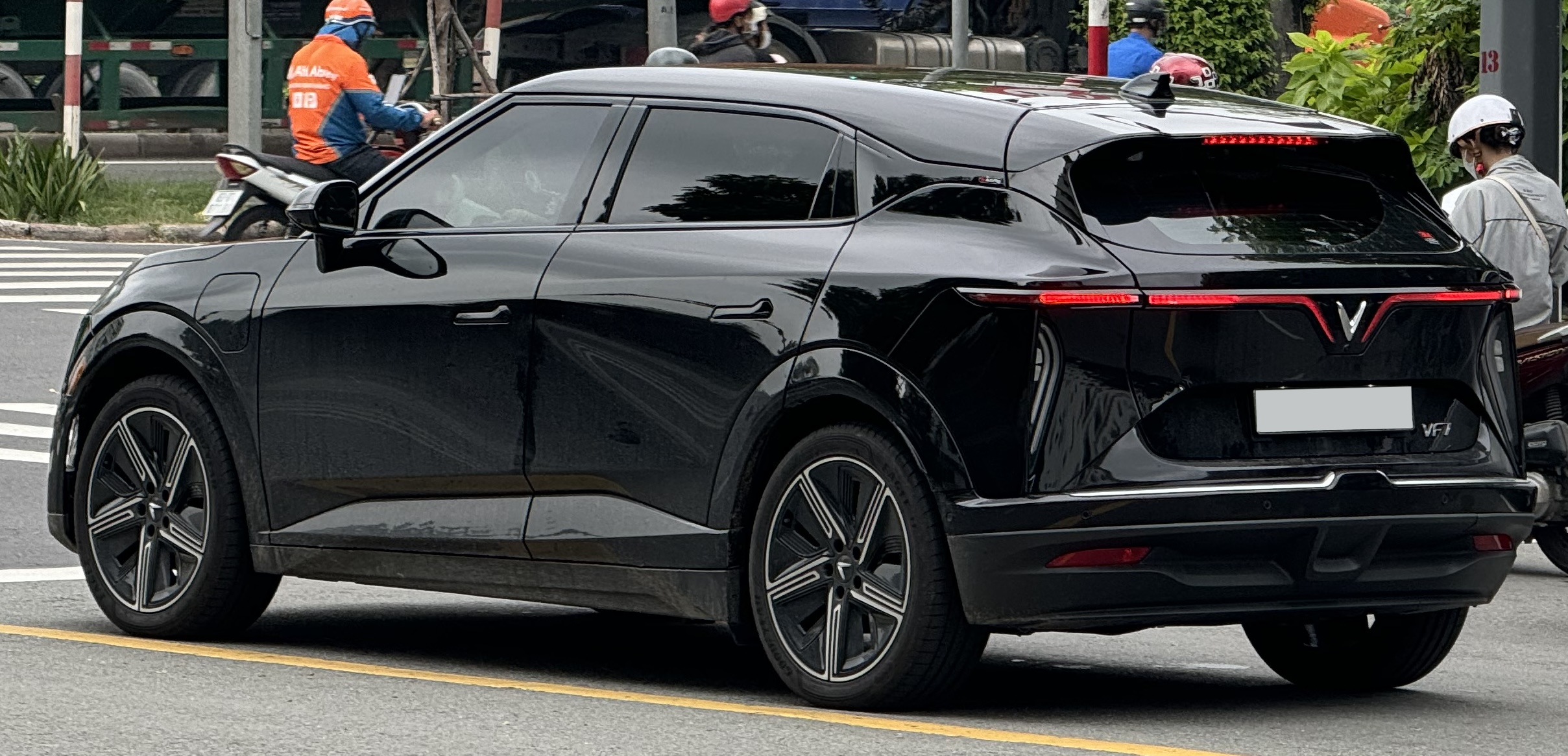
Rear view

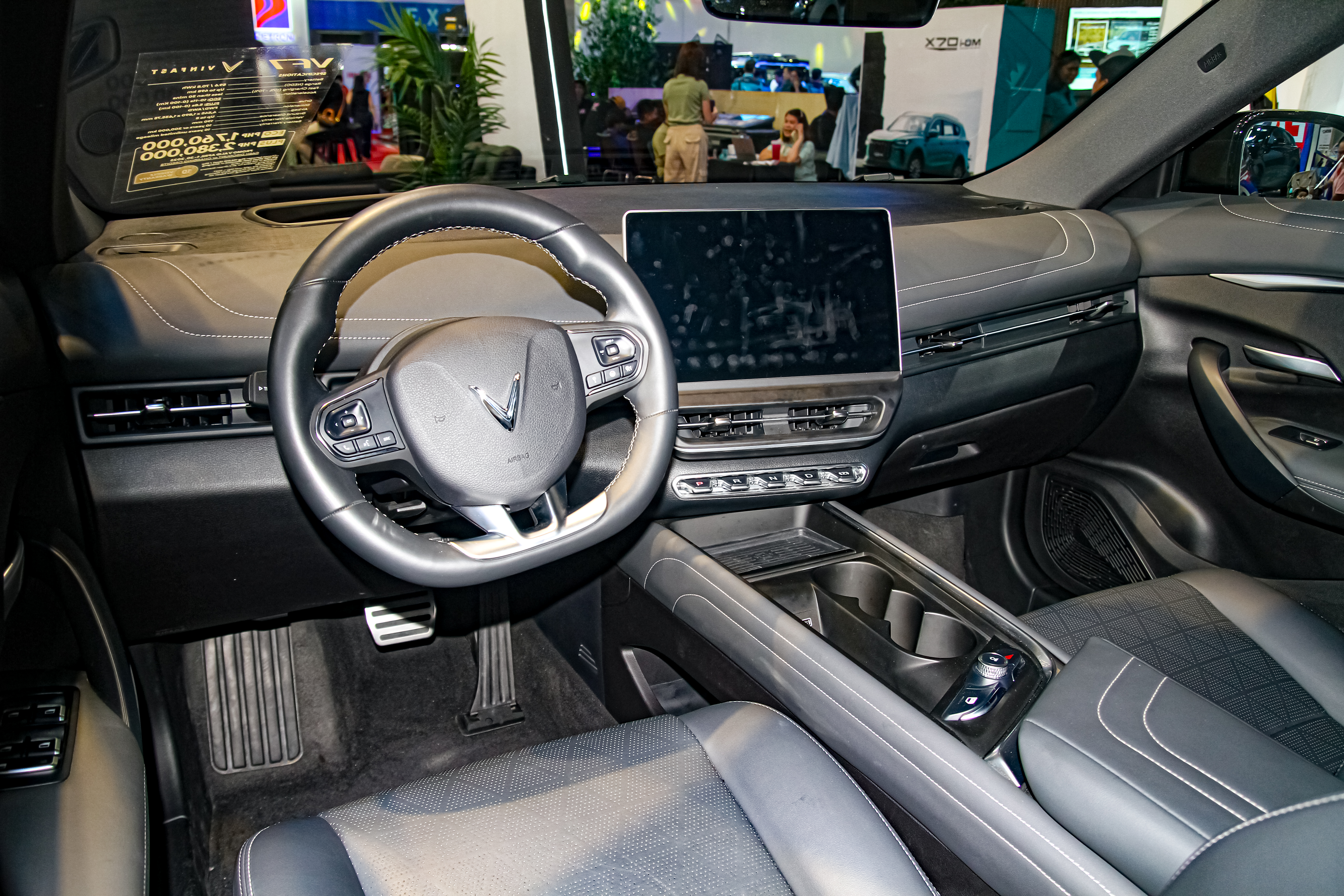
Interior

=== India launch ===
In early 2025, VinFast announced the VF 7 as its debut model for the Indian market. The electric SUV was showcased at the Bharat Mobility Global Expo in New Delhi, alongside other upcoming models such as the VF 3 and VF 9. The company plans to begin local assembly of the VF 7 in Tamil Nadu at a new 400-acre facility with an initial production capacity of 50,000 units per year.

== Equipment ==
The VF 7 is equipped a 15-inch touchscreen infotainment system, a heads-up display, wireless smartphone charging, ambient lighting, leatherette upholstery, and a panoramic sunroof. Safety and driver-assistance technologies include Level 2 ADAS, adaptive cruise control, lane departure warning, blind spot detection, and a 360-degree camera system. The vehicle comes standard with eight airbags and electronic stability control.

== Variants and specifications ==
The VinFast VF 7 is offered in two primary trims: a front-wheel-drive (FWD) variant with a single electric motor, and an all-wheel-drive (AWD) version with dual motors. Both variants are powered by a Lithium Iron Phosphate (LFP) battery, with capacity slightly varying by market.

VinFast VF 7 Variants
Feature	FWD Variant	AWD Variant
Power	201 PS (150 kW)	354 PS (260 kW)
Torque	310 Nm	500 Nm
0–100 km/h Acceleration	9.5 seconds	5.8 seconds
Battery Capacity	70.8 / 75.3 kWh	70.8 / 75.3 kWh
Claimed Range (WLTP)	450 km	431 km
DC Fast Charging	Up to 150 kW	Up to 150 kW
Boot Space	537 litres	537 litres
Safety	8 airbags, Level 2 ADAS	8 airbags, Level 2 ADAS

== Safety ==
Bharat NCAP test results Vinfast VF7 (2026, based on Latin NCAP 2016)
Test	Score	Stars
Adult occupant protection	28.54/32.00	5 /5 stars
Child occupant protection	45.25/49.00	5 /5 stars
