= VinFast VF 3 =

Battery electric city car

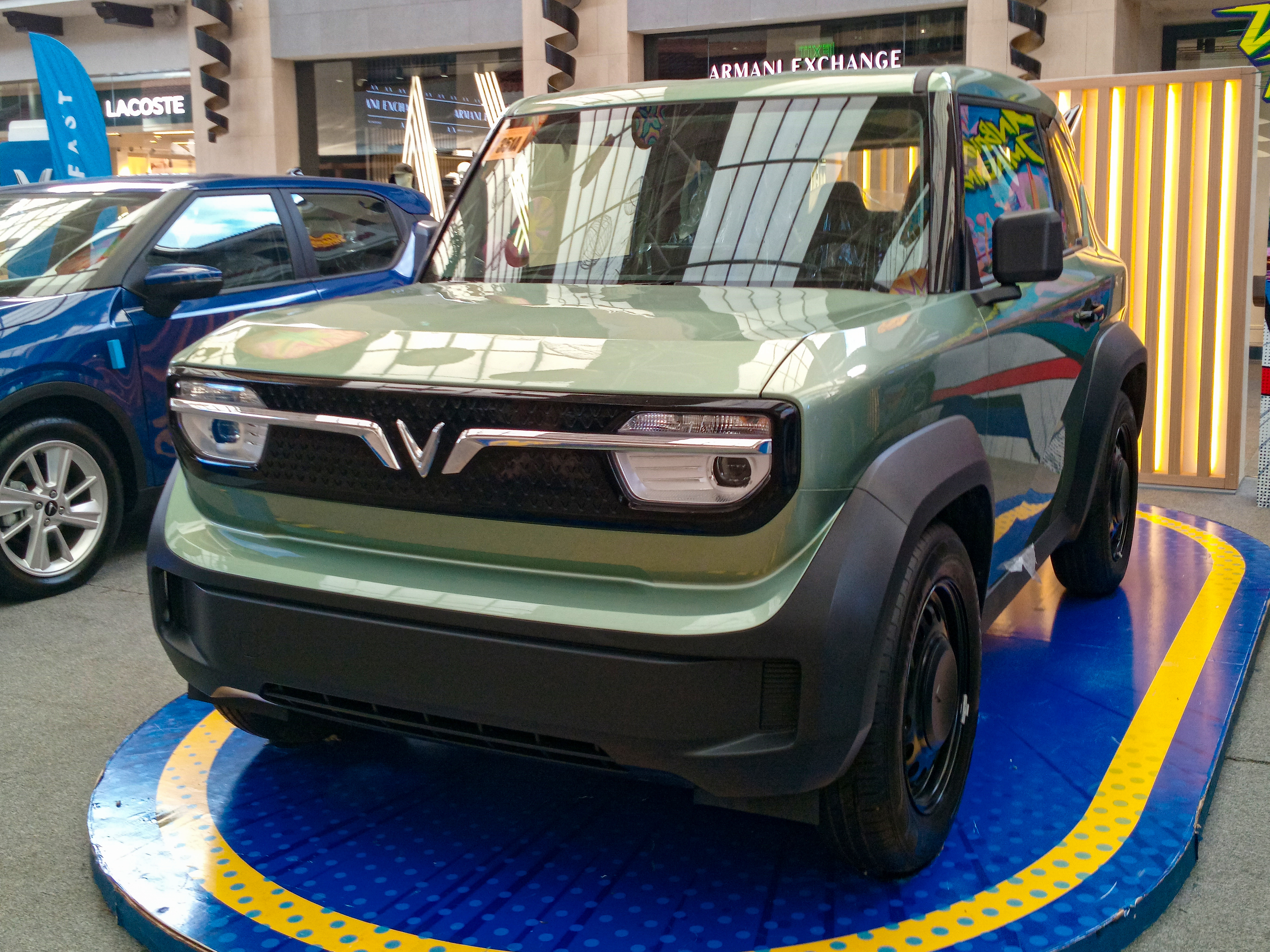

Overview
- Manufacturer: VinFast
- Production: 2024–present
- Assembly: Vietnam: Cát Hải, Haiphong; Indonesia: Subang, West Java (VinFast Indonesia)
- Designer: Gomotiv

Body and chassis
- Class: Mini SUV
- Body style: 3-door SUV
- Layout: Rear-motor, rear-wheel drive
- Related: VinFast EC Van

Powertrain
- Electric motor: Permanent magnet
- Power output: 32 kW (43 hp)
- Battery: 18.64 kWh lithium iron phosphate battery
- Range: 130 miles (NEDC)

Dimensions
- Wheelbase: 2,075 mm (81.7 in)
- Length: 3,190 mm (125.6 in)
- Width: 1,679 mm (66.1 in)
- Height: 1,622 mm (63.9 in)

The VinFast VF 3 is a battery electric city car manufactured and marketed by VinFast of Vingroup from 2023.

== Overview ==
The VinFast VF 3 was unveiled in 2023 in Vietnam. The VF 3 was designed for VinFast by Gomotiv Design Studio, which has studios in Melbourne, Australia and San Diego, California. Three VinFast models, VF 7, VF 3, and VF Wild, were designed by Gomotiv.

The VF 3 has two doors and four seats. It was first sold in Vietnam, then Philippines in 2024, then in Indonesia in 2025. The VF 3 is reported to have a range of 130 miles based on the NEDC cycle.

In August 2024, VinFast delivered the first batch of VF3s to customers who made the earliest deposits after the opening for sale without disclosing the exact figures.

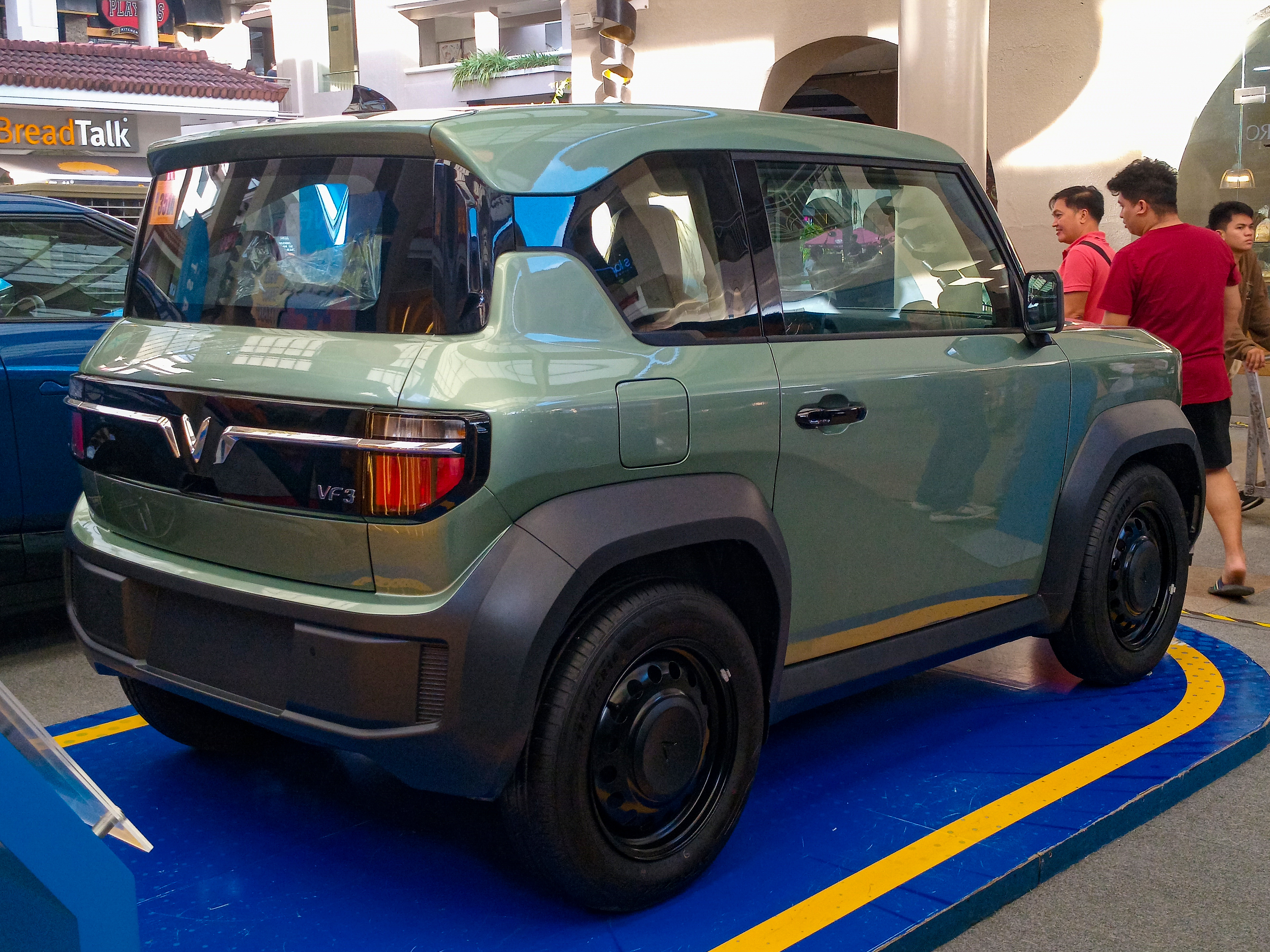
Rear view

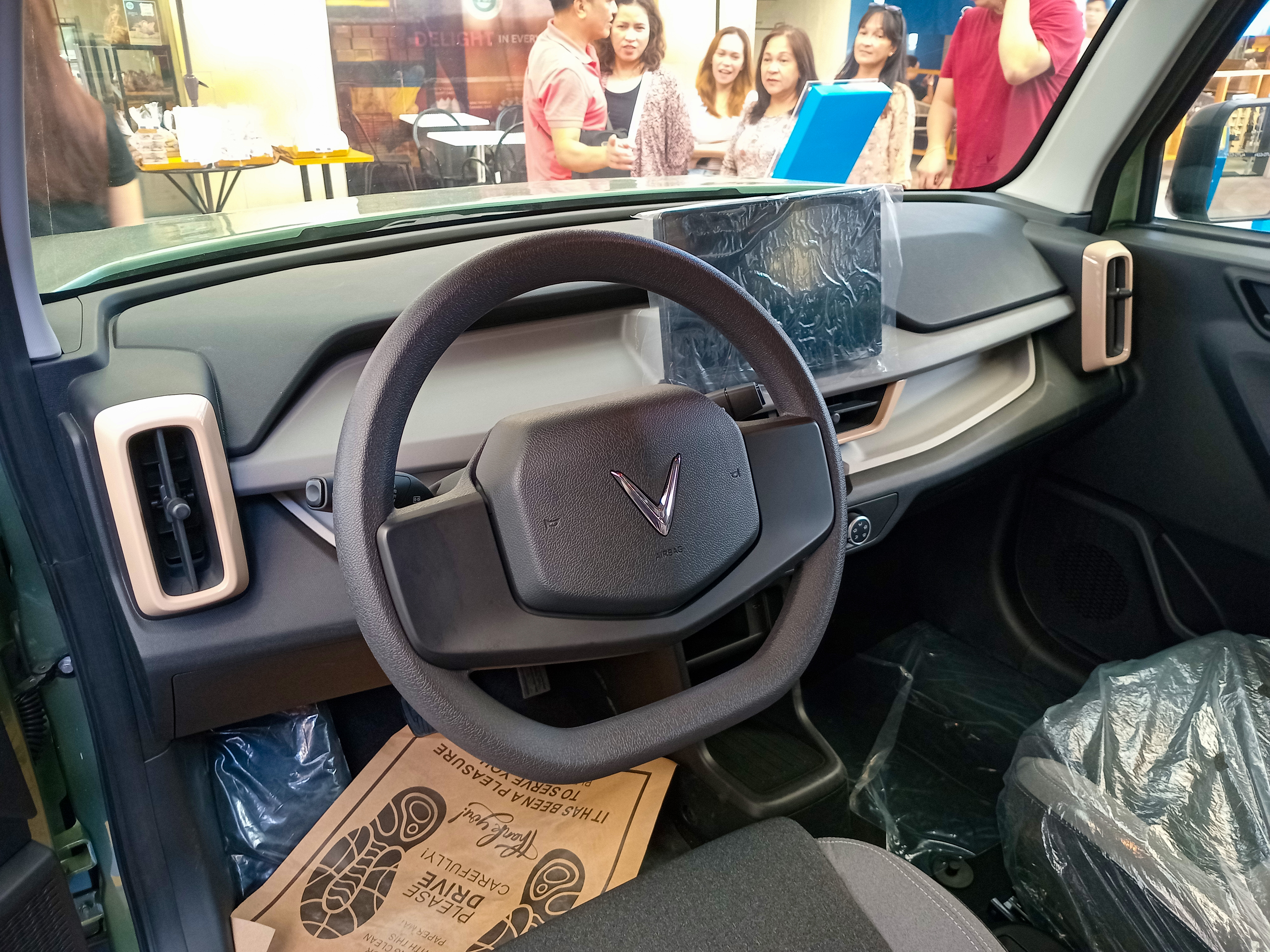
Interior

== Reception ==
The VF 3 went on sale and began accepting deposits on May 13, 2024. After 66 hours, it received 27,649 deposits. On August 1, 2024, VinFast delivered the first batch of VF 3 cars to Vietnamese customers at Vinhomes Riverside.

== Sales ==
Year	Vietnam
2024	25,000
