= Thunder Power =

Chinese automobile manufacturer

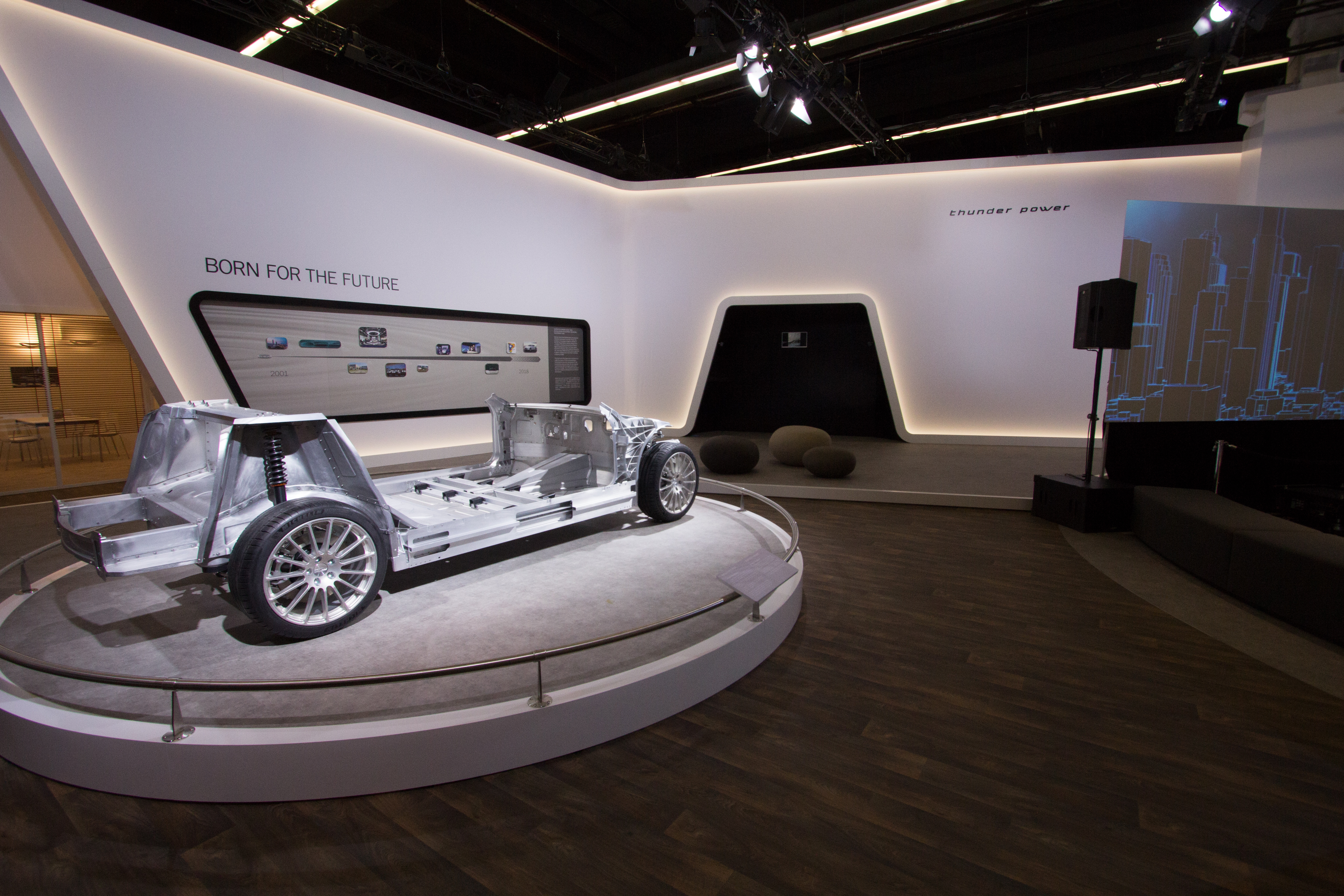
- Type: Private
- Traded as: TWSE: 4529
- Industry: Automotive
- Founded: 2011; 15 years ago
- Founder: Wellen Shen
- Headquarters: Hong Kong
- Key people: Christopher Nicoll (Director and CEO); Mr. Pok Man Ho (Simon) (Interim CFO)
- Website: www.tpev.com/en www.aiev.ai

Thunder Power (Chinese: 昶洧) is a Taiwanese automobile manufacturer that specializes in producing electric vehicles.

== History ==
Thunder Power was founded in 2011, and originally started out in Taiwan. they are currently based in Hong Kong. In 2017, they finished their production plant in Guangzhou. They also have plants built in Catalonia, Spain, Hangzhou, China, and Ganzhou City, China. The design of Thunder Power's vehicles was penned by noted Italian design firm Zagato, and they have won the German Design Award in 2019.

Their first production vehicle was the EV, also called the TP. A Limited Edition of the vehicle was launched, and only 488 were produced. The car was designed by Dallara in Italy. Its dimensions are 4967 mm/1920 mm/1458 mm, a wheelbase is 2994 mm, and a weight of 1900 kg. It has a top charging speed of (three hundred seventy five) 375 miles per hour at a fast station, and will cost ¥1,298,000.

The Chloe is their second production vehicle. It has an 80 kWh battery, and dimensions of 2850 mm/1550 mm. It costs ¥100,000 in China and €13,000 in Europe. After a long break, at the end of November 2021, Thunder Power has announced extensive plans to launch another car factory in another Chinese city, Ganzhou.

== Vehicles ==
=== Current models ===
ThunderPower currently has 2 production vehicles.

Model	Photo	Specifications
ThunderPower EV/TP		Body style: Sedan Class: Doors: 4 Seats: 5 Battery: 125 kWh Production: 2019–present Revealed: 2015 Frankfurt Auto Show
ThunderPower Chloe		Body style: hatchback Class: Doors: 3 Seats: 2 Battery: 85 kWh Production: 2020–present Revealed: 2020

=== Concept Vehicles ===
Model	Photo	Specifications
ThunderPower Racer		Body style: Race car Class: S Doors: 2 Seats: 2 Battery: 320 kW Revealed: 2015 Frankfurt Auto Show
ThunderPower SUV		Body style: SUV Class: Doors: 5 Seats: 5 Battery: 125 kWh Revealed: 2017 Frankfurt Auto Show
ThunderPower City		Body Style: Compact City Car Class: Doors: 2 Seats: 2 Battery: Revealed: 2026 (Official Site)

== See also ==
- ChangJiang
- Dial EV
- GreenWheel EV
- Qingyuan Auto
- Suda
