= Suda (disambiguation) =

Suda may refer to:

- The Suda, a 10th-century Byzantine dictionary and encyclopedia
- Suda (surname)
- Somnath Urban Development Authority (SUDA), an urban planning authority in Gujarat, India
- Suda, Nepal, a village development committee in Kanchanpur District in the Mahakali Zone of south-western Nepal
- Suda (river), a river in Vologda Oblast in Russia
- Suda Station, a train station in Hashimoto, Wakayama Prefecture, Japan
- Naka-Suda Station, a former railway station in Kaminokuni, Hokkaido, Japan
- Suda Bay Passage, a channel through reef off the western coast of Australia
- Suda Bay (ship), a 14.3 ton Australian motor boat
- As Suda', a village in south-western Yemen
- Suda Hachiman Shrine Mirror, a National Treasure of Japan
- Hasaki Ya Suda, a 2011 Burkina Faso film
- Scopula suda, a moth of the family Geometridae
- Suda (marque), a Chinese car maker

== See also ==
- Souda (disambiguation)
- Suddha (disambiguation)
