= Souda (disambiguation) =

Souda, alternative spelling Suda (Greek: Σοῦδα), can refer to:

- Souda, a town on the coast of Crete, Greece
  - Souda Bay, a bay and natural harbour in Crete, near the town of the same name
  - Souda Bay Naval Base, a naval base in Crete in the bay of the same name
  - Souda Island, an island in the bay of the same name
  - Chania International Airport, an airport on the Akrotiri peninsula near Souda Bay
- Souda, Senegal, a village in Senegal
- Souda (company), an American design studio that specializes in furniture, lighting, and home decor
- The Suda, a 10th-century Byzantine dictionary and encyclopedia
- Goichi Suda, "Suda51"; video game director
- Sudas, ancient Indian king

== See also ==
- Suda (disambiguation)
- Soda
