= Sudha (disambiguation) =

Sudha is a Hindu/Sanskrit Indian feminine given name.

Sudha may also refer to:

- Sudha (actress), Indian actress
- Sudha (magazine), a Kannada-language Indian magazine
- Suda or Souda, a 10th-century Byzantine encyclopedia
- Bihar State Milk Co-operative Federation, a milk cooperative selling with the brand name Sudha Dairy
