= Huali Dafa =

Chinese microvan

Huali
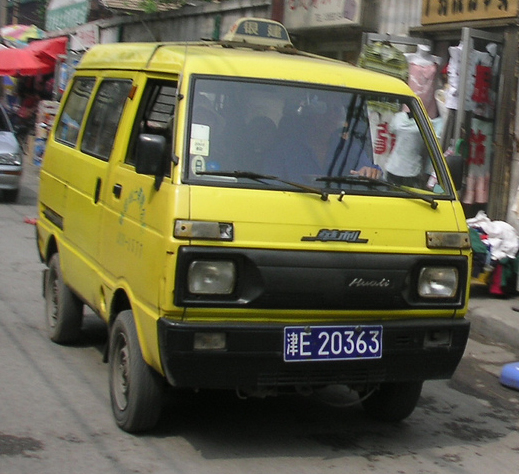
- Huali Dafa

Overview
- Also called: Daihatsu Hijet
- Production: 1984–2002
- Assembly: Tianjin, China

Body and chassis
- Body style: 5-door van 4-door Pickup truck 2-door Pickup truck

Powertrain
- Engine: 843 cc CD I3
- Transmission: 4-speed manual

Dimensions
- Wheelbase: 1,819.9 mm (71.65 in)
- Length: 3,195.3 mm (125.8 in)
- Width: 1,395.0 mm (54.92 in)
- Height: 1,659.9 mm (65.35 in)
- Curb weight: 740–760 kg (1,630–1,680 lb)

The Huali Dafa is a three-cylinder microvan and Pickup truck under the Huali product series produced by FAW Tianjin, a member of First Automotive Works Group in the People's Republic of China since being introduced in 1984. Dafa translates to Daihatsu in Chinese which means that it is a rebadged Daihatsu model.

== Overview ==
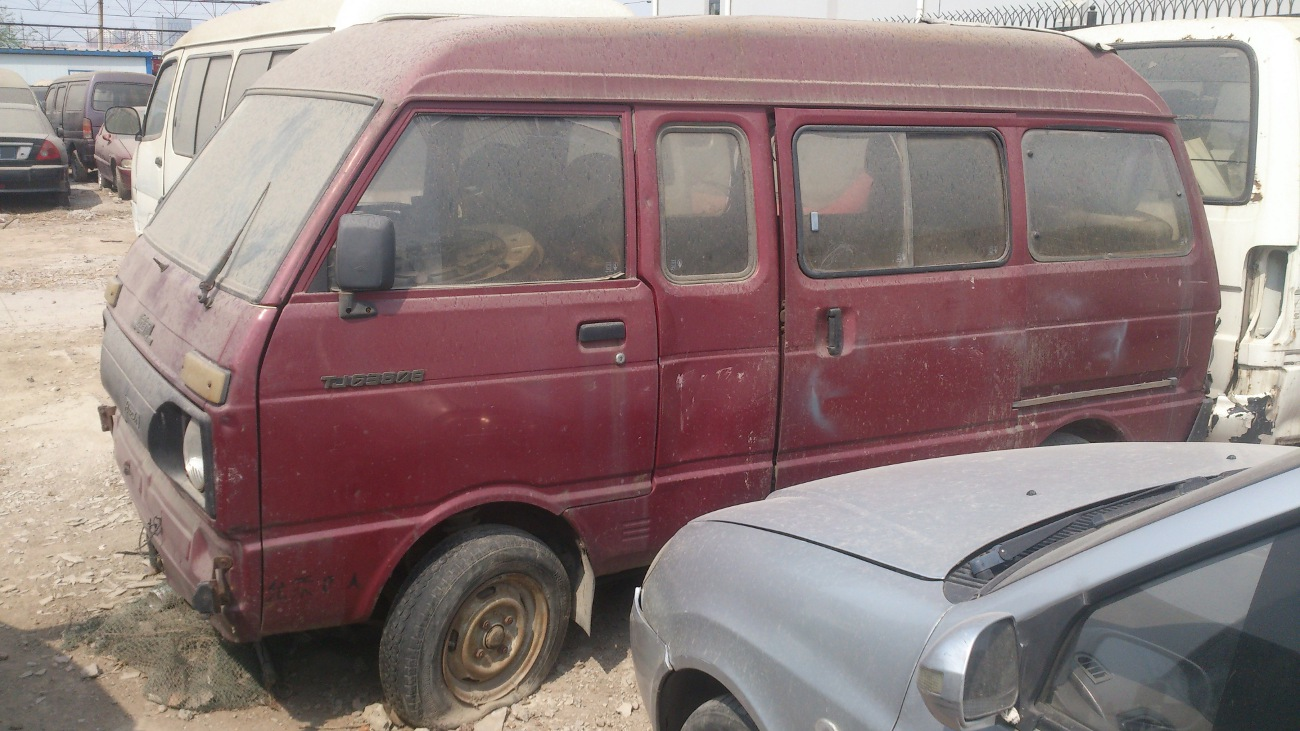
A Huali Dafa TJ6350B

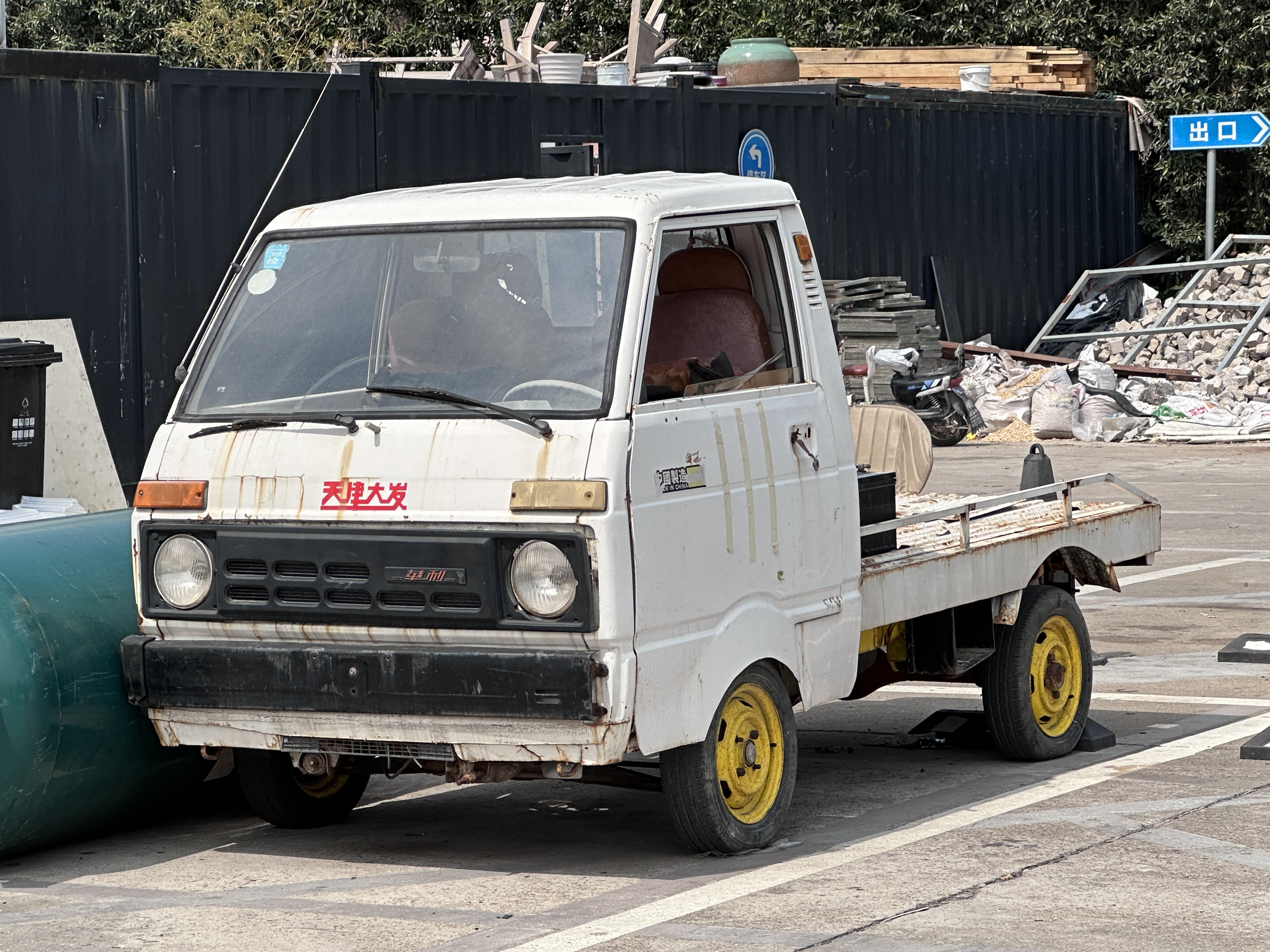
A Huali Dafa TJ1010A

The Huali Dafa is well known for its low cost and reliability. Because of its tall shape with a rounded top it is commonly nicknamed the "bread car" in China. Production of the Huali Dafa was discontinued some time ago, but hundreds of thousands remain on the roads of China. By far, its most common color is maroon, followed by silver. The Huali Dafa was used as a taxicab in the 1980s until it was replaced by Xiali and Volkswagen cars in the 1990s.

The first Dafas looked very similar to the 1981 Daihatsu Hijet, but two major facelifts left late versions looking quite different, with body-colored bumpers and grille accompanying a slightly elongated nose. Originally, the Dafa's internal code was TJ110 (1984–1989). After 1989 model codes switched to TJ6320 and TJ6350 for minivans, while trucks were called TJ 1010SL, TJ 1010A, and TJ 1013F. These were built alongside the facelifted TJ6330 and TJ 1010FL/FLA (introduced in 1998 for the 1999 model year) until production of all versions ended in 2002.

Huali went on to produce two rebadged versions of the first-generation Daihatsu Terios known as the Huali Dario and the first-generation Daihatsu Move known as the Huali TJ5015XFY or Happy Messenger sold from 2003 to 2008. The Huali TJ5015XFY forms the basis for an electrical version, sold in the United States as the Miles ZX40.
