= Suda (marque) =

Chinese automobile manufacturer

- Type: Private
- Industry: Automotive
- Founded: September 2010; 16 years ago
- Headquarters: 34.7692°N 111.2489°E Sanmenxia
- Website: www.sudacar.cn

Suda (Chinese: 速达), also known as Henan Suda EV (Chinese: 河南速达电动汽车) and in short, SD EV, is a Chinese electric vehicle manufacturer.

== History ==
Suda was founded in 2010, by Li Fuhuo (李复活), an engineer from Weinan, Shaanxi, who previously founded a company producing gasoline engine parts. The company is based in Sanmenxia, Henan. In May, they built a 2.6 billion yuan 100,000 unit annual production factory that was completed in August 2018.

Their first production vehicle was the SA01, also called the Lanse. It is powered by a 45 kWh battery that gives 107 horsepower. Its dimensions are 4046 mm/1737 mm/1606 mm, a wheelbase of 2500 mm, and a kerb weight of 1390 kg.

The SD01 was Suda's second vehicle, also called the Yinse. It also has a 45 kWh and 107 horsepower. It is 4417 mm/1737 mm/1576 mm, and has a wheelbase of 2500 mm, and a weight of 1390 kg. It was marketed under Yema.

== Controversies ==
The Sanmenxia city government has supported the company as part of a transition to a high-tech and renewable energy economy. The company attracted controversy, with local media calling it a 'zombie-company', as it appeared dormant for 5 years, with only some prototypes built, and eventually starting mass-production in 2019. In 2015, the company failed to pay out wages to employees. According to revenue numbers it was estimated that the company produced just 240 vehicles in 2019, most of them purchased by Henan government agencies and its own employees.

The SA01 was exported to Germany in 2020, according to a Chinese reporter, this was just for show, as the company hadn't even made any sales to Chinese consumers yet at the time. The SA01 has subsequently been criticized and avoided because of its bad crash test results.

== Vehicles ==
Suda currently has 2 production vehicles.

Model	Photo	Specifications
Suda SA01/Lanse		Body style: Sedan Class: Electric vehicle Doors: 5 Seats: 5 Battery: 45 kWh Production: 2020-present Revealed: 2017
Suda SD01/Yinse		Body style: hatchback Class: Electric vehicle Doors: 4 Seats: 5 Battery: 45 kWh Production: 2020-present Revealed: 2017

== See also ==
- Landwind X6, also attracted controversy after failing European crash test
- Dial EV
- GreenWheel EV
- Qingyuan Auto
