= Suda (surname) =

Suda is a surname. It is most seen in Japanese name associated with a village in Shinano Province. It is most commonly found in northeastern and west-central Japan, and on Okinawa Island. Some bearers descend from the Minamoto clan through the Inuoe family.

- Akari Suda (born 1991), Japanese pop singer
- Anna Suda (born 1997), Japanese performer and actress
- Brian Suda (born 1979), American informatician
- Friedrich Suda (born 1939), Austrian swimmer
- Goichi Suda (born 1968), Japanese video game designer
- Hubert Suda (born 1969), Maltese football player
- Issei Suda (born 1940), Japanese photographer
- Izumi Suda (born 1943, Newell, CA USA IT Manager
- Kenji Suda (born 1966), Japanese ski jumper
- Kosuke Suda (born 1980), Japanese football player
- Kota Suda (born 1986), Japanese baseball player
- Masaki Suda (born 1993), Japanese actor and singer
- Masanori Suda (born 1973), Japanese mixed martial artist
- Mohammed al-Tawudi ibn Suda (1700–1795), Arabic scholar
- Orhan Suda (1916–?), Turkish cyclist
- Peeter Süda (1883–1920), Estonian organist and composer
- Sucharit Suda (1895–1982), Thai royalty
- Tetsuo Suda (born 1948), Japanese TV presenter
- Yoshimasa Suda (born 1967), Japanese football player

== See also ==
- Suda Chaleephay (born 1987), Thai weightlifter
- Suda (disambiguation)
- Sudha, given name
- ja:須田, ja:菅田
