= Sundararaman =

Sundararaman is a surname and given name. People with the surname include:

- Lavanya Sundararaman
- Sudha Sundararaman
- Sundararaman ramanan
