= Sudi =

Sudi may refer to:

== Given name ==
- Sudi Abdallah (born 2000), Burundian footballer
- Sudi Devanesen (born 1943), Canadian physician and educator
- Sudi Nangoli, Ugandan academic and businessman
- Sudi Özkan (1939–2026), Turkish businessman
- Sudi Silalahi (1949–2021), Indonesian politician

== Middle name ==
- Abdullahi Sudi Arale (born 1964), Somali Guantanamo detainee
- Musa Sudi Yalahow, Somali politician

== Surname ==
- Ahmed Sudi (died 1598), Bosnian-Ottoman commentator
- Haji Sudi (1858–1920), Somali Dervish leader
- Oscar Sudi, Kenyan politician

== Places ==
- Sudi, India, panchayat town in the Gadag District of Karnataka, India
- Sudi or Mulukbu, Kenya

== See also ==
- Shuddhi (disambiguation)
