= EV Valley =

Themed city and tourist destination in China

EV Valley (Chinese: 电动车谷) is an electric vehicle themed city and tourist attraction built by the Chinese low-speed electric vehicle company GreenWheel EV.

== History ==
EV Valley's design was first shown at the International New Energy Auto Show of Hong Kong in 2015. It was planned to create an all-electric miniature city that would house entertainment and GreenWheel EV's production plant. The city was finished in 2017, and was the company's main production center.

== Buildings ==
Name	Details	Completion
National all-electric vehicle production center	GreenWheel EV's production plant, largest all-electric vehicle production plant in China	2015
National Electric Vehicle Research, Development, and Detection Center	Parts production workshop, produces and manufactures parts	2015
National Electric Vehicle Parts Integration Center	Integrate the parts, improve parts, connect parts	2015
National Electric Vehicle Conference & Exchange Center	Conference hall, vehicle exhibition hall	2015
National All-electric Vehicle Education and Training Center	Vehicle technology training school	2015
World All-electric Vehicle Theme Park	All-electric vehicle playground, vehicle landscape, vehicle test drive track, vehicles in the food district, first all-electric vehicle theme park in the world	2017
World all-electric vehicle race course	Vehicle racing track, auditorium, uses all-electric formula car	2017
National New Energy Popularization Museum	Pavilion, vehicle museum	2017
National Resort Hotel	Star Hotels, Business Hotels	2017
National All-electric Vehicle Demonstration & Operation Center	Charging station, parking lot, model of all-electric vehicle operation	2017

== See also ==
- GreenWheel EV
