= Huali Happy Messenger =

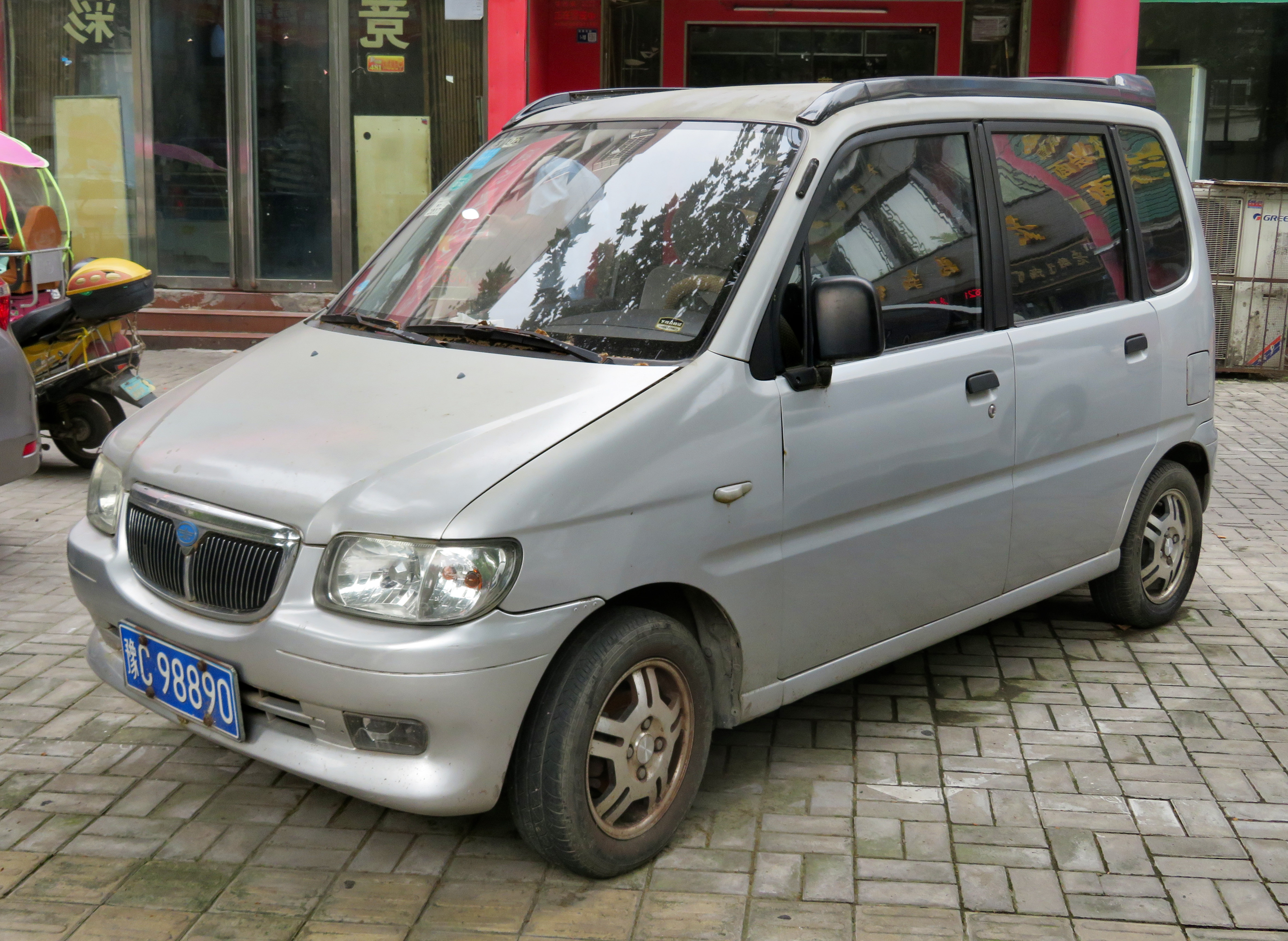

Overview
- Also called: Miles ZX40/ZX40S (United States)
- Production: 2003 – 2008 (Huali); 2006 – 2013 (Miles)

Body and chassis
- Related: Daihatsu Move (L900); Daihatsu Mira (L700)

Powertrain
- Engine: 1.0L inline-4 (petrol)
- Power output: 55 kW (74 hp; 75 PS)
- Transmission: 5-speed manual

Dimensions
- Wheelbase: 2,360 mm (92.9 in)
- Length: 3,395 mm (133.7 in)
- Width: 1,475 mm (58.1 in)
- Height: 1,695 mm (66.7 in); 1,670 mm (65.7 in) (Custom); 1,650 mm (65.0 in) (Aero Down Custom)
- Kerb weight: 780–890 kg (1,720–1,962 lb)

The Huali Happy Messenger is a city car manufactured by the Chinese automaker Huali from 2003 to 2008 and from 2006 to 2013 for American market electric vehicles startup Miles Electric Vehicle.

== Overview ==
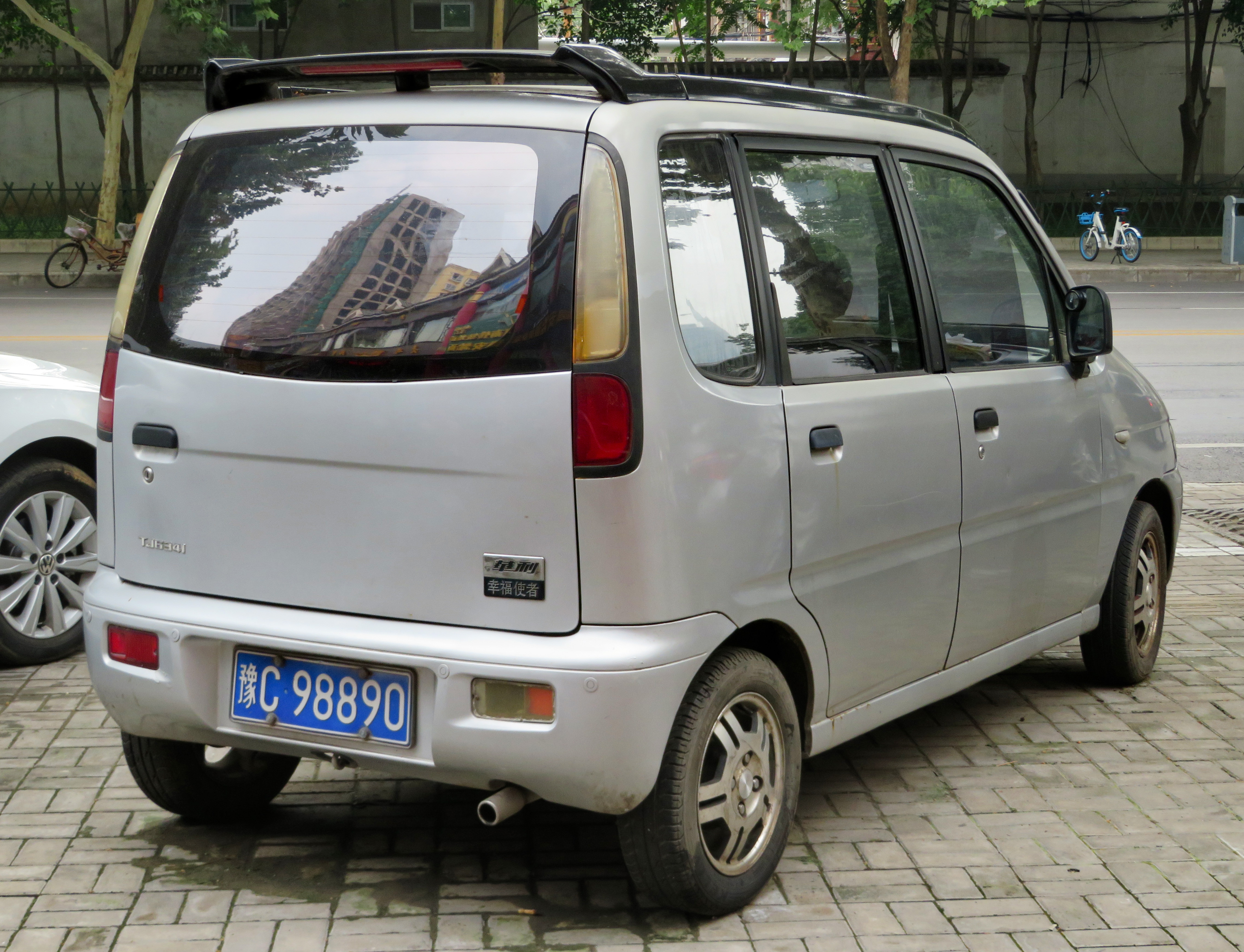
2005 FAW-Huali(Jiaxing) Happy Messenger TJ6341, rear

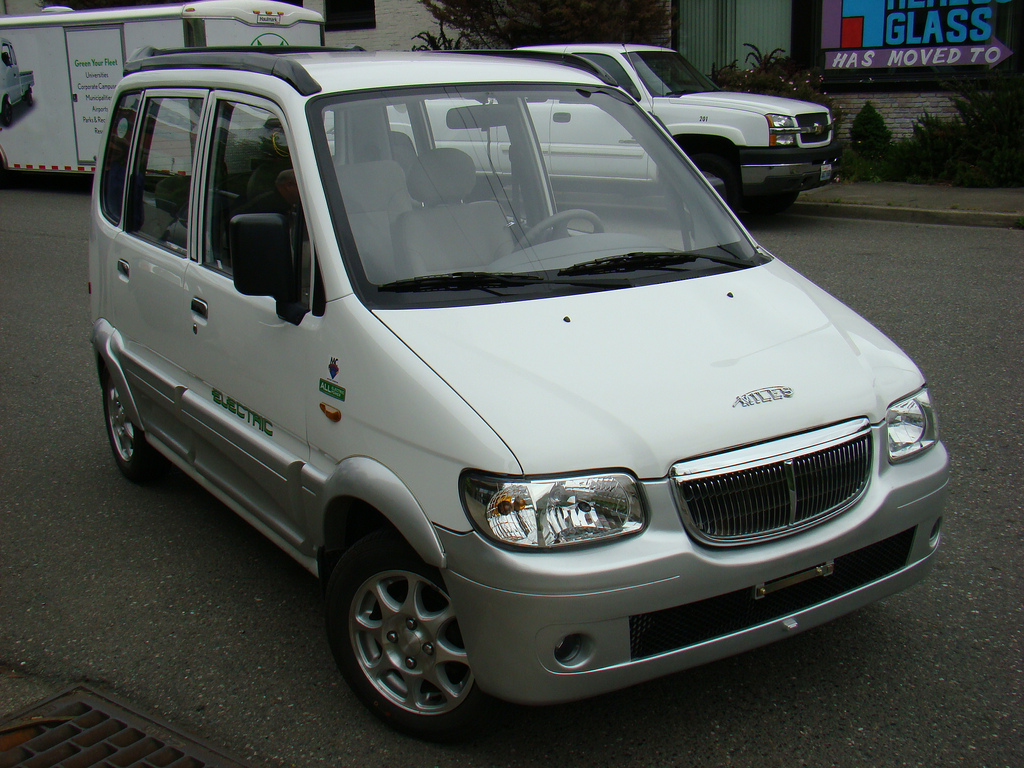
Miles ZX40 electric car for United States

The Huali Happy Messenger was manufactured by the Huali brand which was later renamed as FAW-Jiaxing.

The Huali Happy Messenger was introduced in 2003 and shares the same platform as the second generation Daihatsu Move which is built upon the chassis of the Mira but with a taller body.

The Happy Messenger by Huali was powered by a 1.0 4-cylinder engine producing 55 hp and mated to a 5-speed manual gearbox. The Happy Messenger was exported to many foreign countries including Egypt and several Eastern European countries, and was marketed mostly under the name FAW Angel. An electric variant was also offered in the US as the Miles ZX40.
