= Batavia Road (boat) =

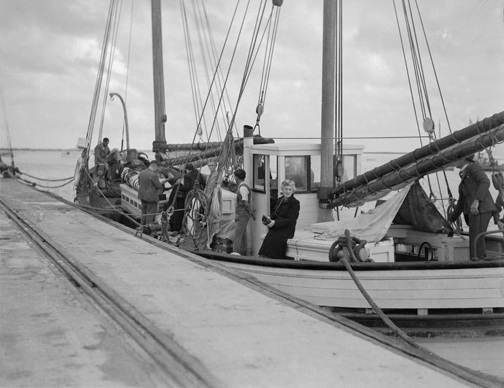
- Batavia Road taking on passengers, circa 1947

History

Australia
- Name: Batavia Road
- Owner: 1947-1948 Dal Gaze and Alan Fox; 1948-1951 Dal Gaze
- Port of registry: Fremantle
- Completed: 1946
- Identification: Official number 140199
- Fate: Wrecked 1974

General characteristics
- Type: Auxiliary motor boat
- Tonnage: 37grt
- Length: 60.6 ft (18.5 m)
- Beam: 18.5 ft (5.6 m)
- Depth: 10.5 ft (3.2 m)
- Sail plan: Ketch

Batavia Road was a passenger boat used from 1946 for commercial tourist operation in the Houtman Abrolhos, a group of islands off the coast of Western Australia.

== History ==
The 37grt ketch-rigged wooden motor boat Batavia Road was launched and completed in December 1946 by H Willmott & Co in Fremantle, Western Australia, from whom it had been ordered by the Australian Army during World War II. The boat had a registered length of 60.6 ft (18.5 m), length overall of 66.0 ft (20.1 m), beam of 18.5 ft (5.6 m) and depth of 10.5 ft (3.2 m). The boat was powered by a Gray marine diesel of 225 bhp, giving a speed of 8 knots. It was registered at Fremantle in 1947 with official number 140199.

In order to promote tourism to the Houtman Abrolhos, the Western Australia State Government obtained the boat from the Australian Army for purchase by Archdale "Dal" Gaze and Alan Fox. Batavia Road made its first sailing from Geraldton on Christmas Day 1946 and until 1948, together with their another boat, Suda Bay, Gaze and Fox transported tourists to and from the Houtman Abrolhos, especially Pelsaert Island. This was the first known commercial tourist operation in the Houtman Abrolhos. After the partnership split in 1948, Gaze continued using Batavia Road for tourism, as well as transporting stores and their catch for lobster fishermen based on the islands. On 13 June 1948 a cyclone struck the Houtman Abrolhos and the Batavia Road was blown ashore at Wreck Point, near the Half Moon Reef and was nearly sunk. Tourists assisted the crew in salving the boat and fabricating a replacement rudder and, after help from fishermen, they were able to make the passage back to Geraldton. Repairs were extensive and the boat returned to service in August 1948.

Gaze eventually wound up his tourist operation in 1951.

Later, Batavia Road passed to other owners, and foundered on rocks 20 miles (32 km) north of Geraldton on 25 January 1974.

An anchorage at Pelsaert Island is named Batavia Road.
