= Shuddhi =

Shuddhi or Suddhi (lit. 'purity/purification') may refer to:

- Shuddhi (Hinduism), type of conversion to Hinduism or Sikhism
- Purity in Buddhism
- Shuddhi (2015 film), an unrealized Indian film by Karan Malhotra
- Shuddhi (2017 film), a 2017 Indian Kannada-language film
- Shuddhi (2023 film), a film about leprosy patients in India

== See also ==
- Suddha (disambiguation)
- Sudi (disambiguation)
