= Changhe Beidouxing =

Chinese mini MPV

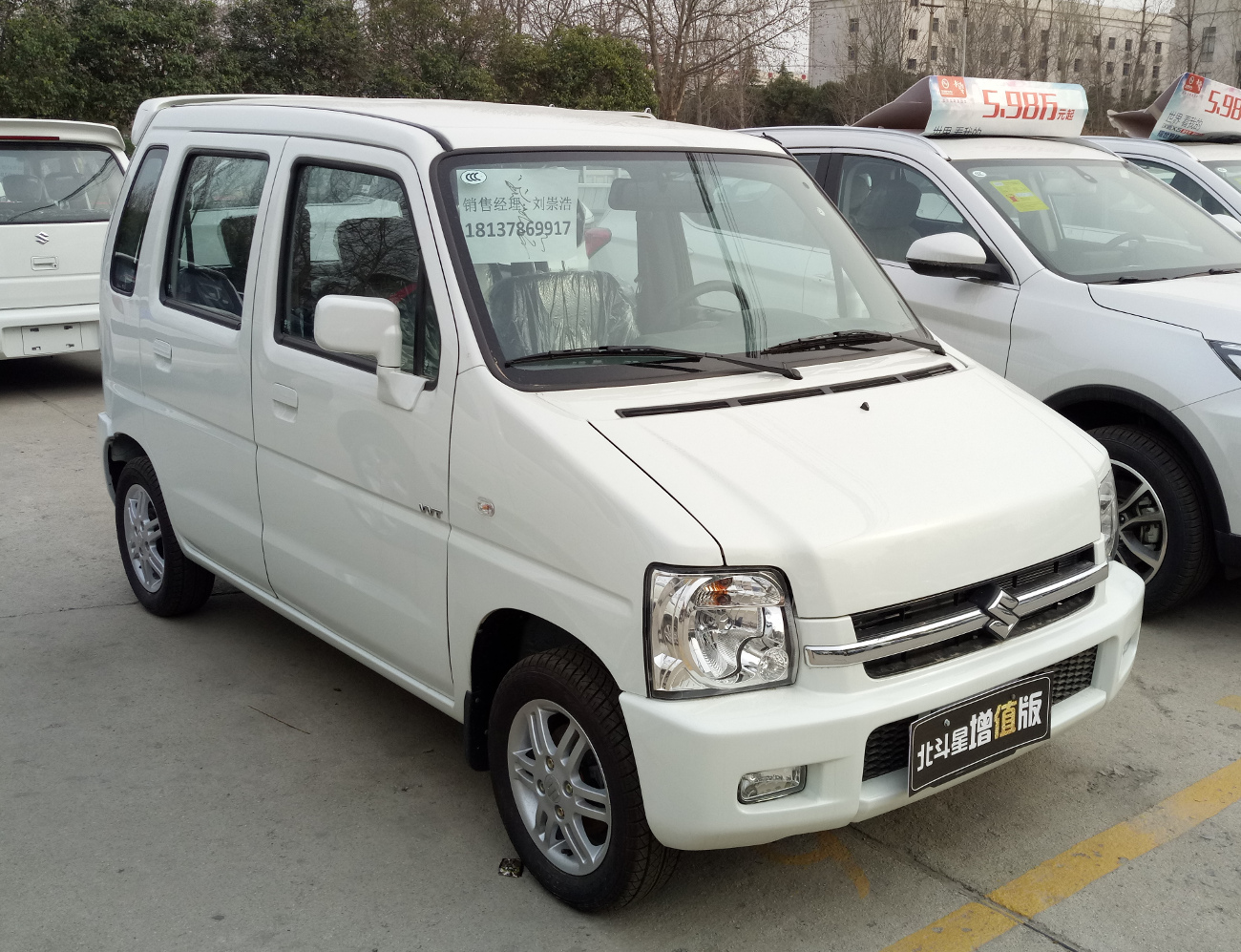
- Changhe Beidouxing

Overview
- Manufacturer: Changhe
- Production: 2004–2022

Body and chassis
- Class: MPV

The Changhe Beidouxing (北斗星) or Changhe Big Dipper is an MPV produced by BAIC under the Changhe marque from 2004 until 2022.

== First generation (2004) ==
Changhe Beidouxing
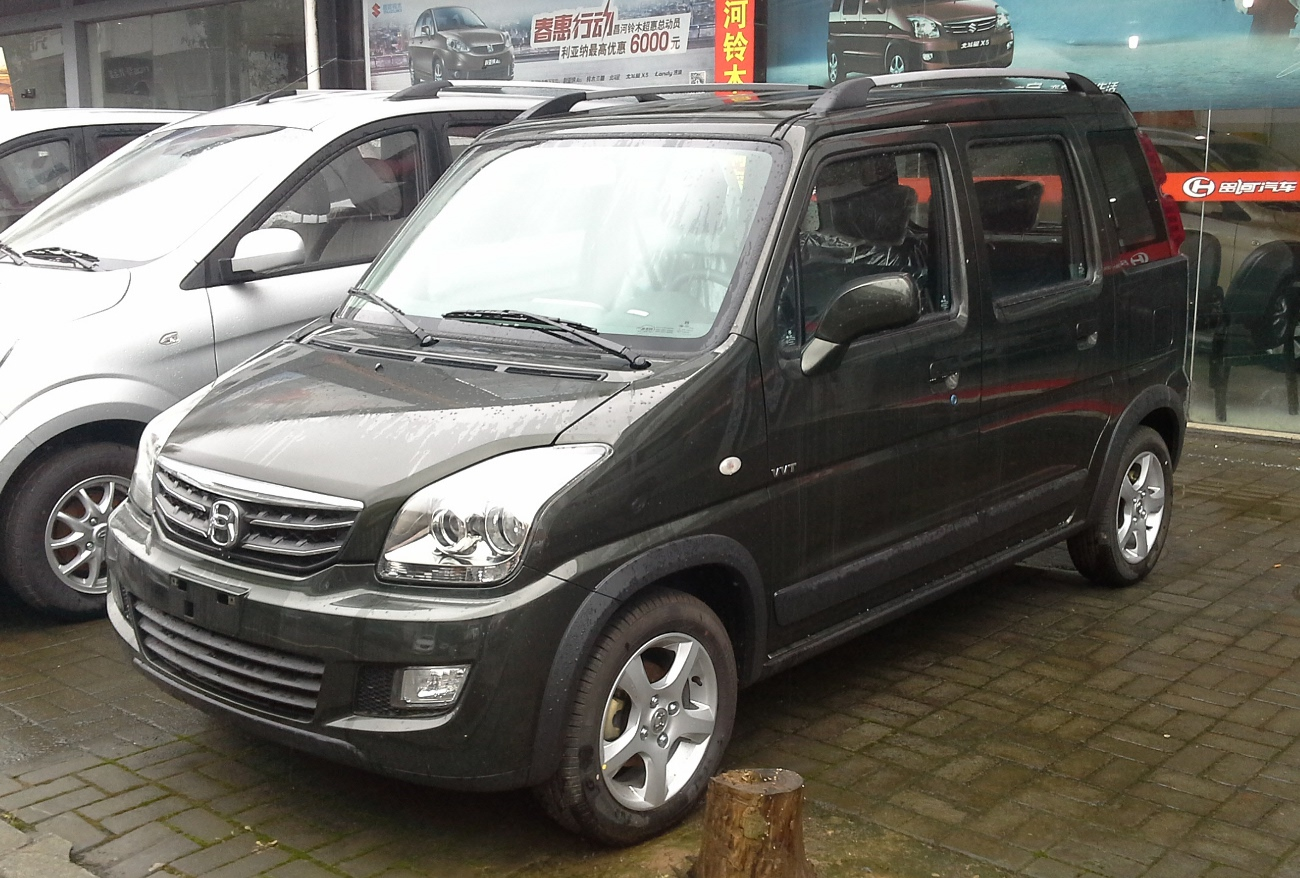
- Changhe Beidouxing X5

Overview
- Manufacturer: Changhe
- Also called: Changhe Big Dipper; Changhe Beidouxing X5; Qingyuan Baoqi; Changhe CoolCar (Guatemala); Cenntro Logistar 100 (Europe, Electric commercial version)
- Production: 2004–2022

Body and chassis
- Class: Mini MPV
- Related: Suzuki Wagon R+

Powertrain
- Engine: 1.4 L K14B I4 (petrol)
- Transmission: 5-speed manual

Dimensions
- Wheelbase: 2,335 mm (91.9 in); 2,485 mm (97.8 in) (Beidouxing X5)
- Length: 3,400 mm (133.9 in); 3,664 mm (144.3 in) (Beidouxing X5)
- Width: 1,575 mm (62.0 in); 1,610 mm (63.4 in) (Beidouxing X5)
- Height: 1,670 mm (65.7 in); 1,722 mm (67.8 in) (Beidouxing X5)

The Changhe Beidouxing was based on the same platform as the first generation Suzuki Wagon R+, and was originally an extended licensed production that turned into a rebadged model. The model is powered by a 97 hp 1.4-liter petrol engine sourced from Suzuki.

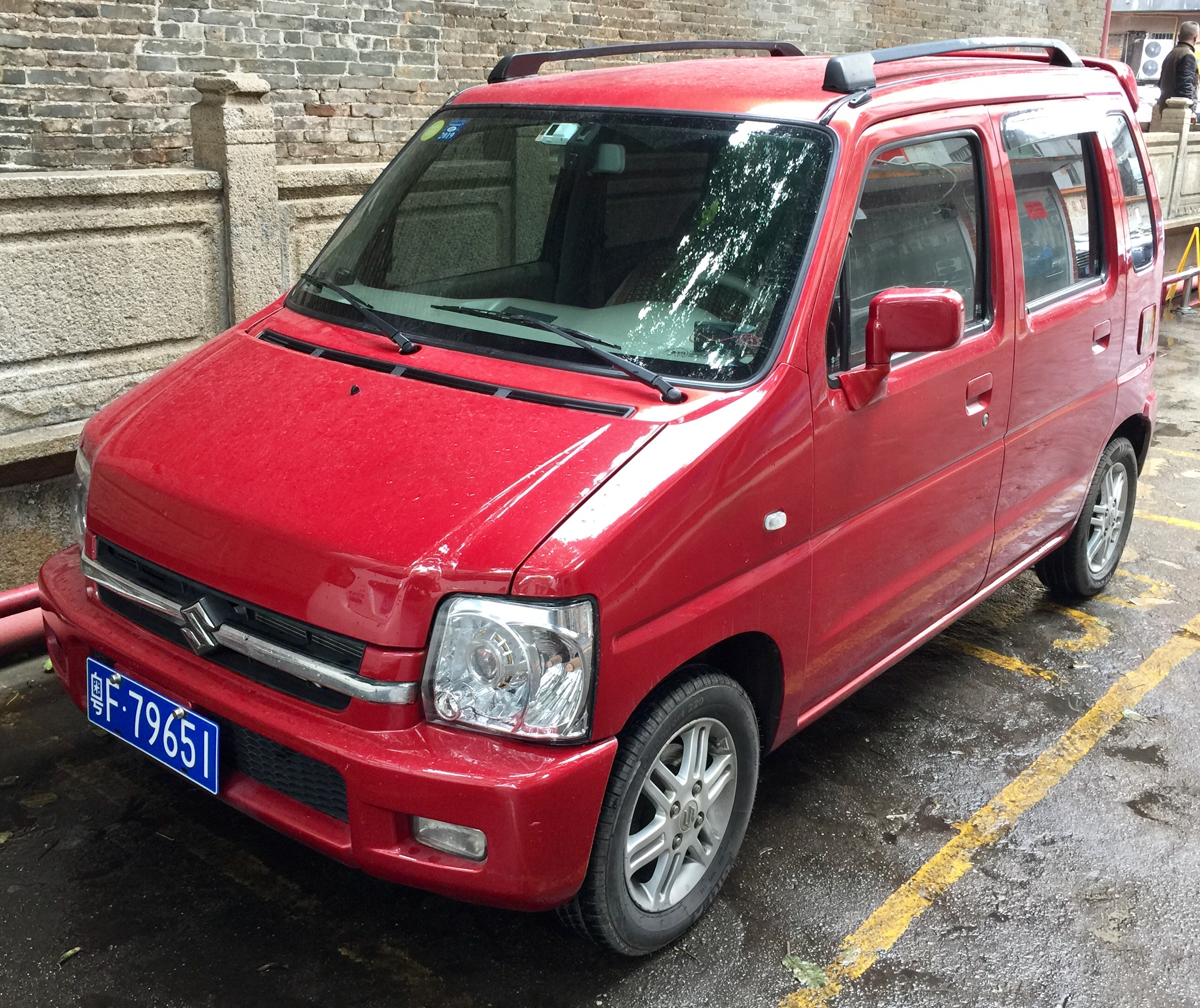
Changhe-Suzuki Beidouxing (front)

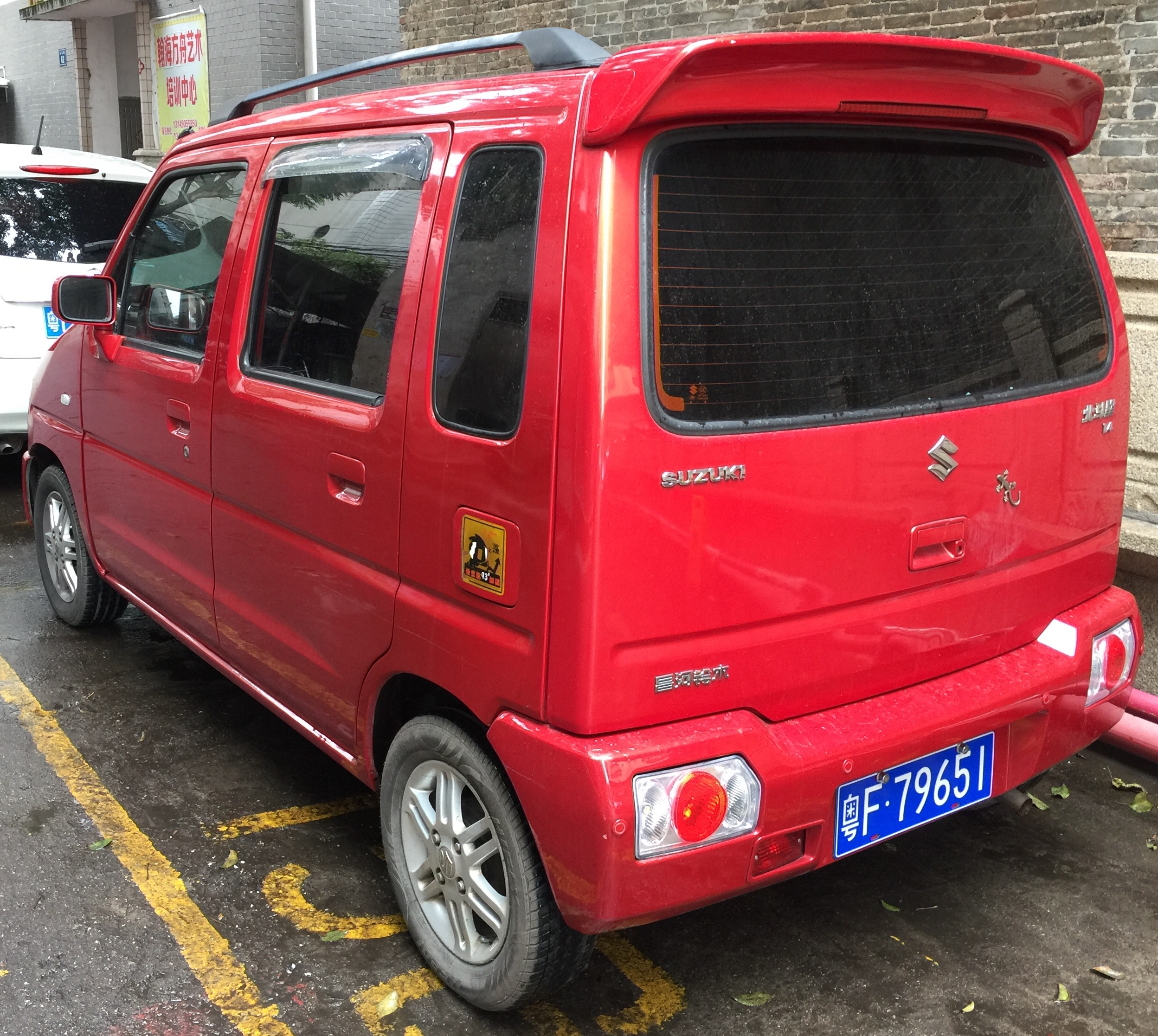
Changhe-Suzuki Beidouxing (rear)

Changhe Beidouxing (front)

Changhe Beidouxing (rear)

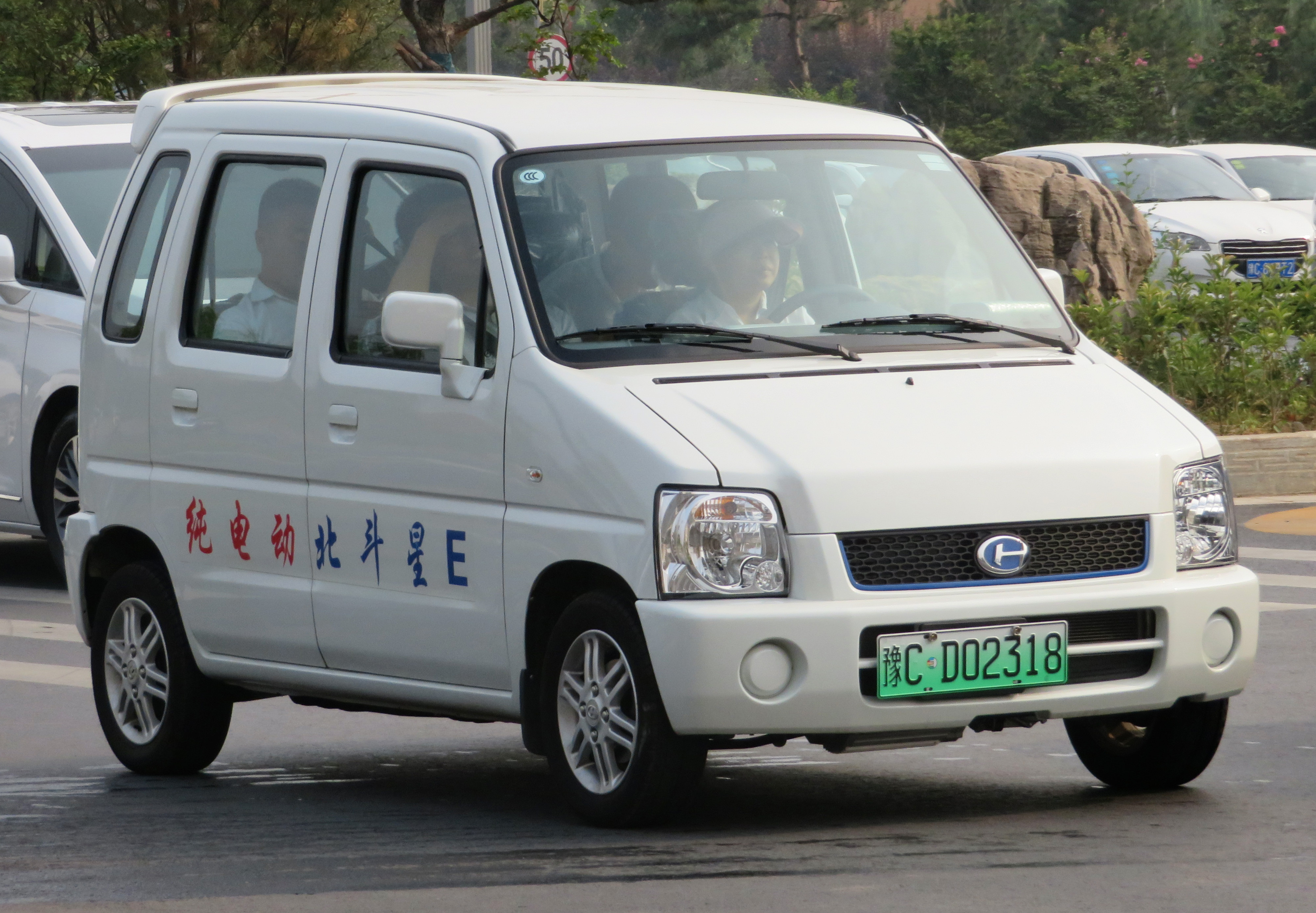
Changhe Beidouxing E

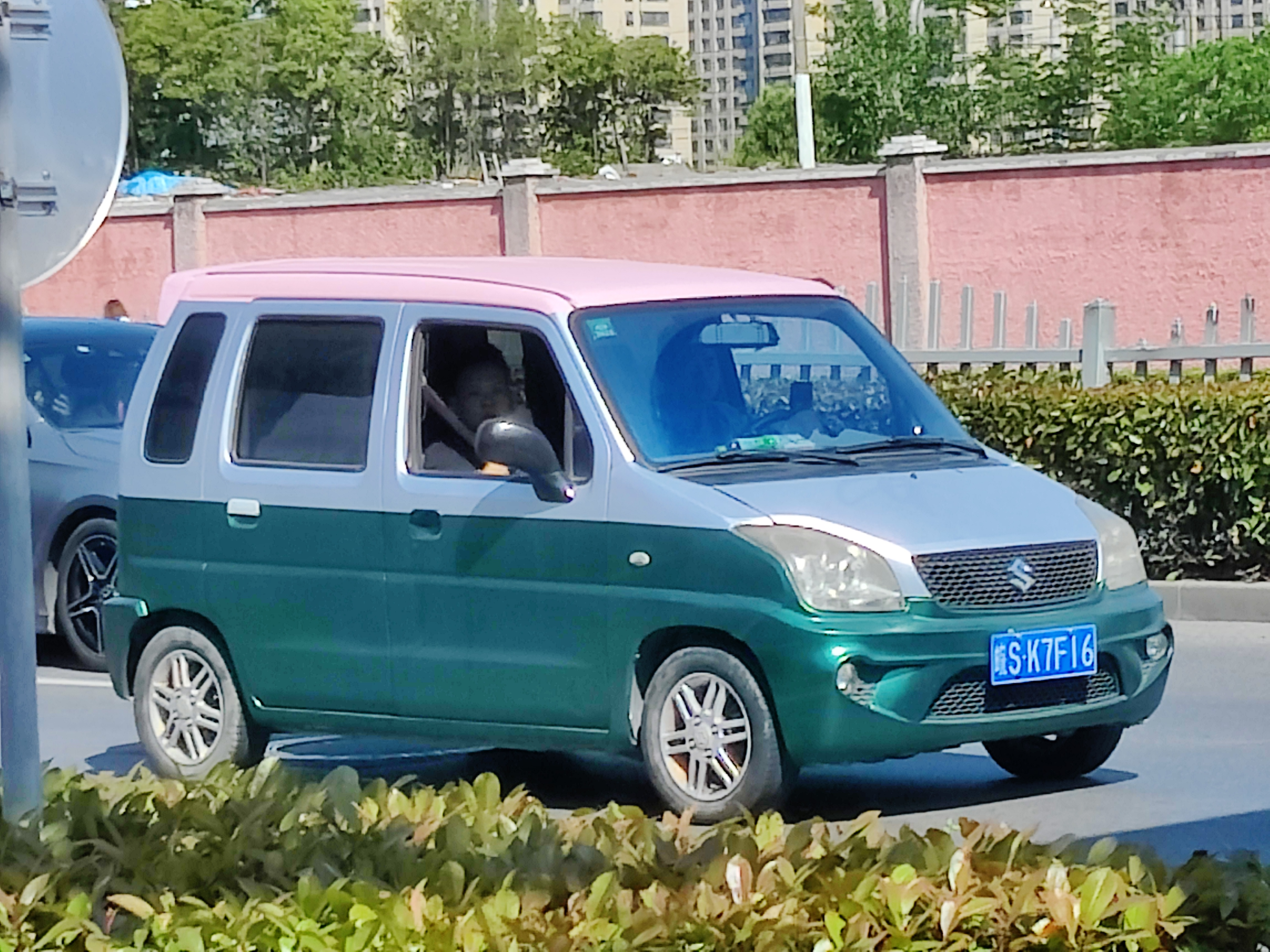
Suzuki Beidouxing E+ (front)

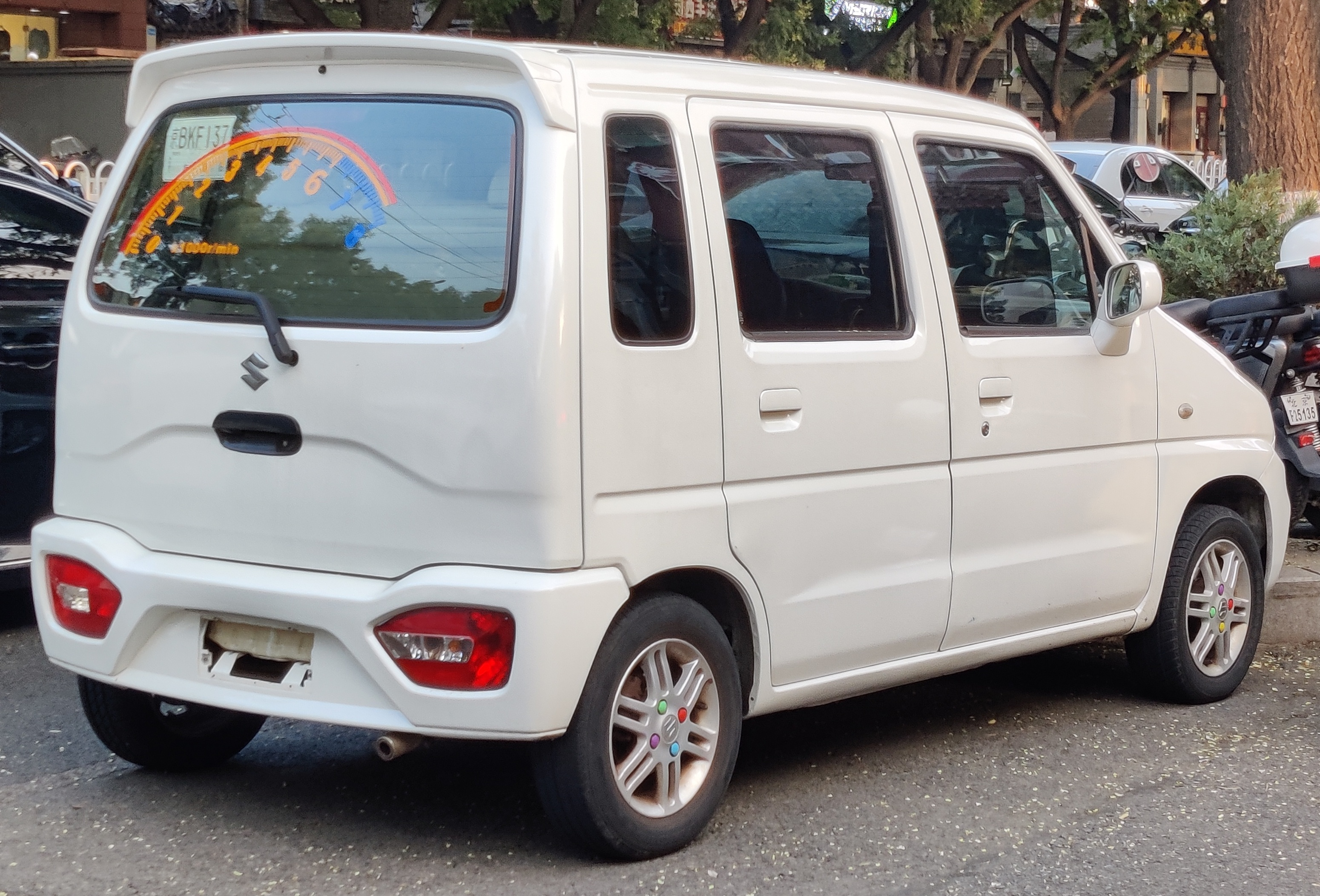
Suzuki Beidouxing E+ (rear)

=== Changhe Beidouxing X5 ===
The Changhe Beidouxing X5 is the long wheelbase version of the Changhe Beidouxing, featuring the second facelift front end of the Changhe Beidouxing, and a revised rear end with tail lamps on the D pillars. Prices of the Changhe Beidouxing X5 ranges from 41,900 yuan to 51,900 yuan. An electric version called the Beidouxing X5E was available as of 2016, featuring an electric motor with 41 hp.

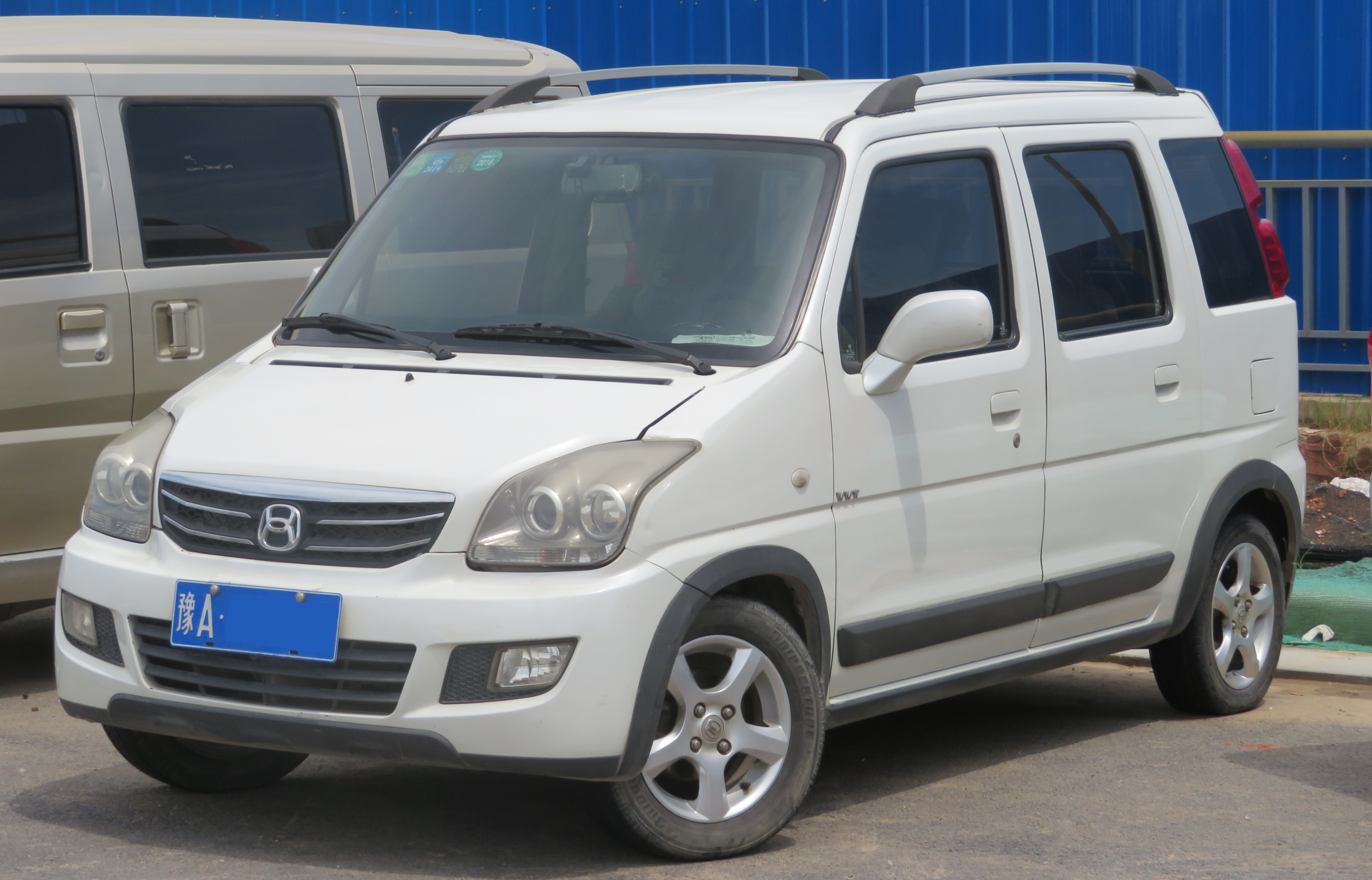
Changhe Beidouxing X5 (front)

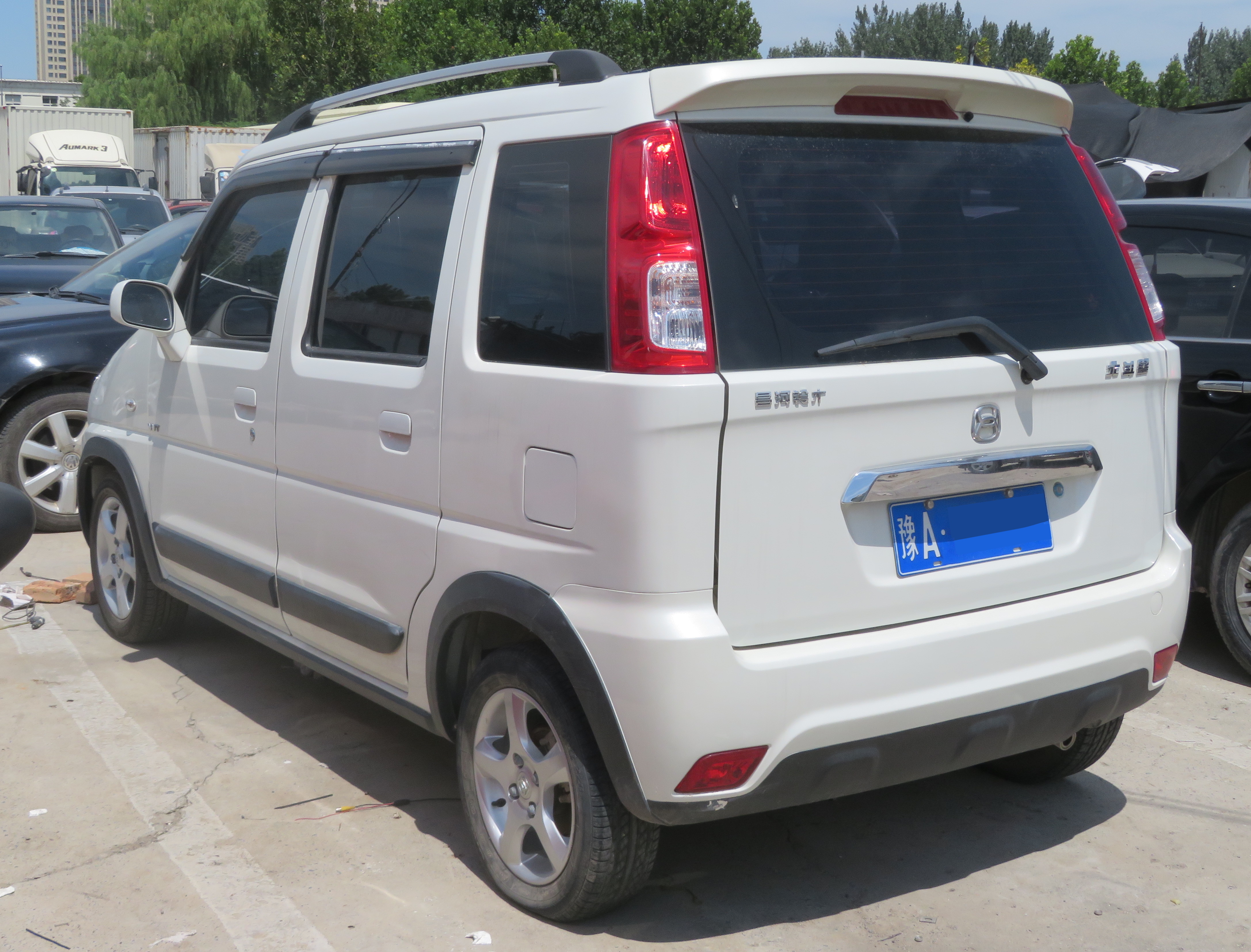
Changhe Beidouxing X5 (rear)

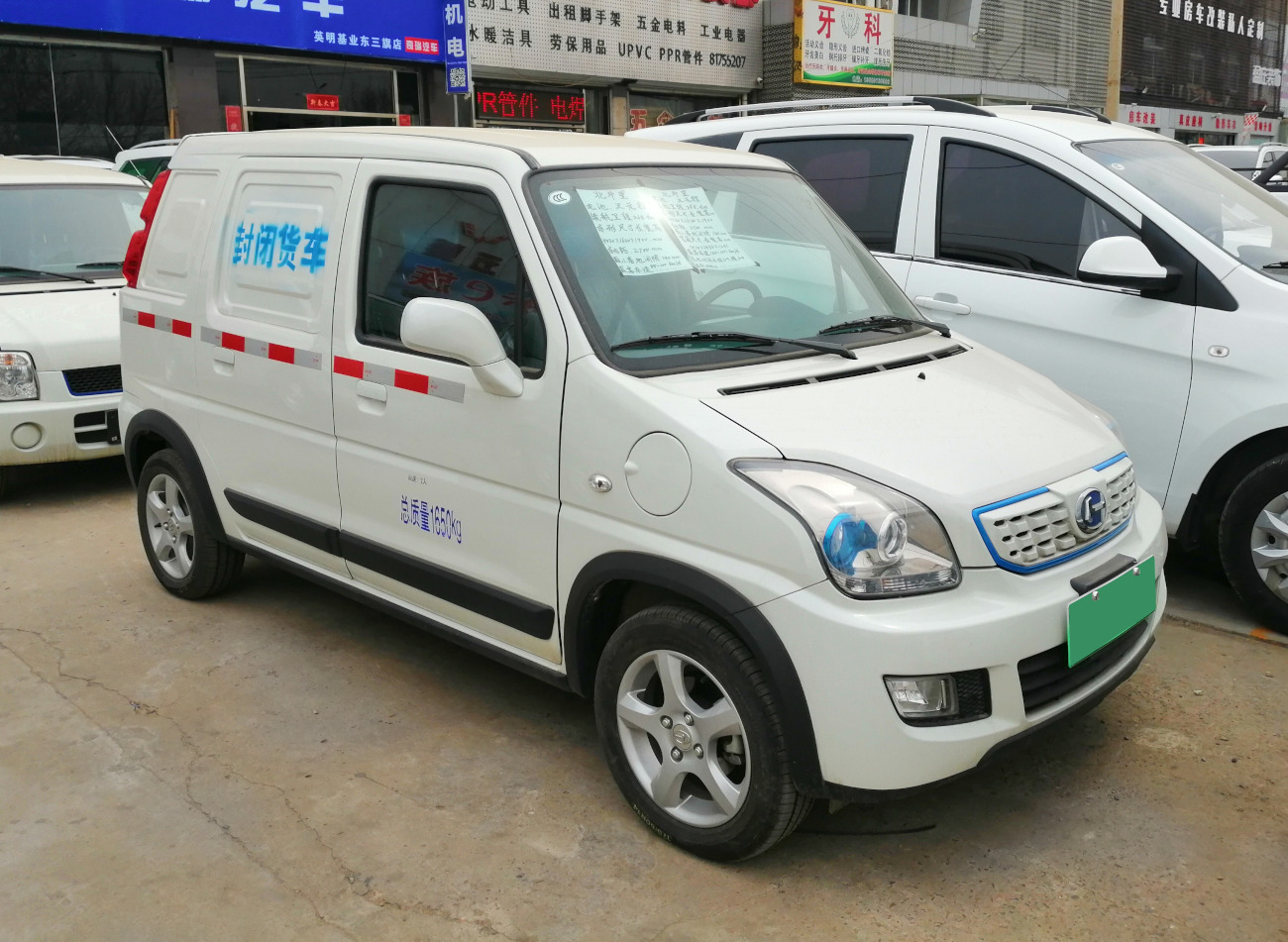
Changhe Beidouxing X5E (front)

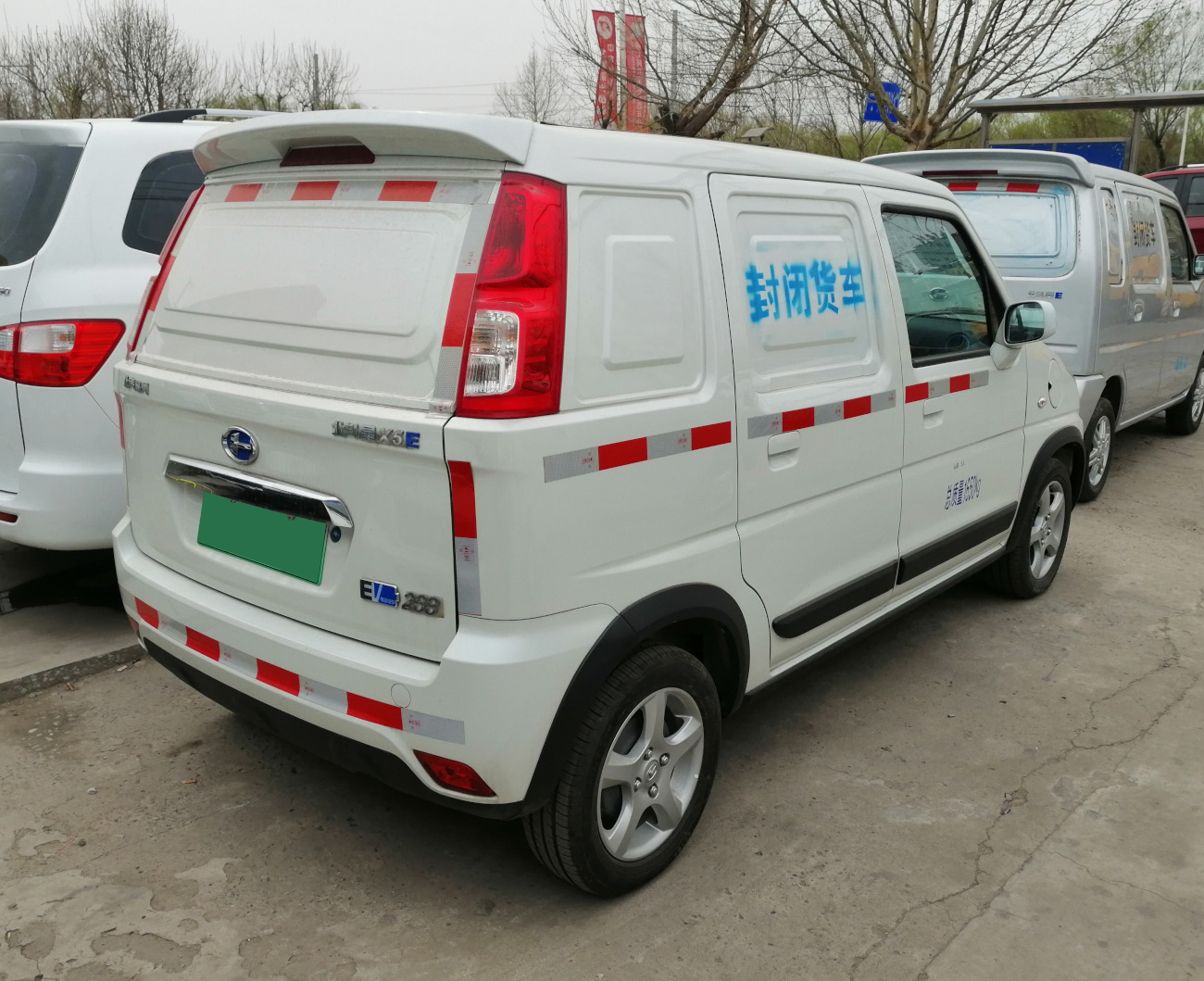
Changhe Beidouxing X5E (rear)

== Second generation (2019) ==
Changhe Beidouxing II
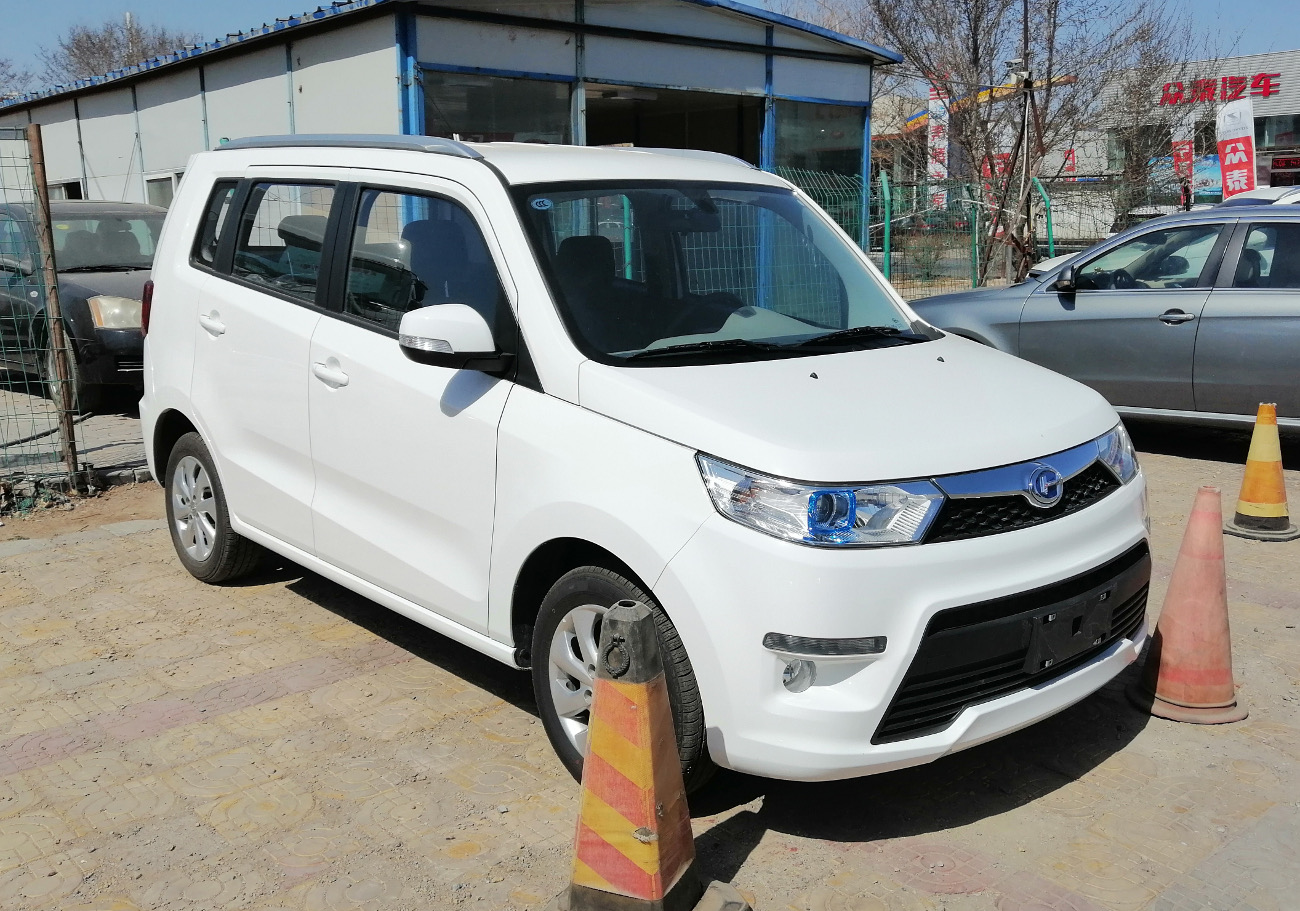

Overview
- Manufacturer: Changhe
- Also called: Changhe Big Dipper; Changhe Beidouxing X5
- Production: 2019–2022

Body and chassis
- Class: Mini MPV
- Related: Suzuki Wagon R

Powertrain
- Engine: 1.4 L K14B I4 (petrol)
- Transmission: 5-speed manual

Dimensions
- Wheelbase: 2,530 mm (99.6 in)
- Length: 3,950 mm (155.5 in)
- Width: 1,740 mm (68.5 in)
- Height: 1,690 mm (66.5 in)

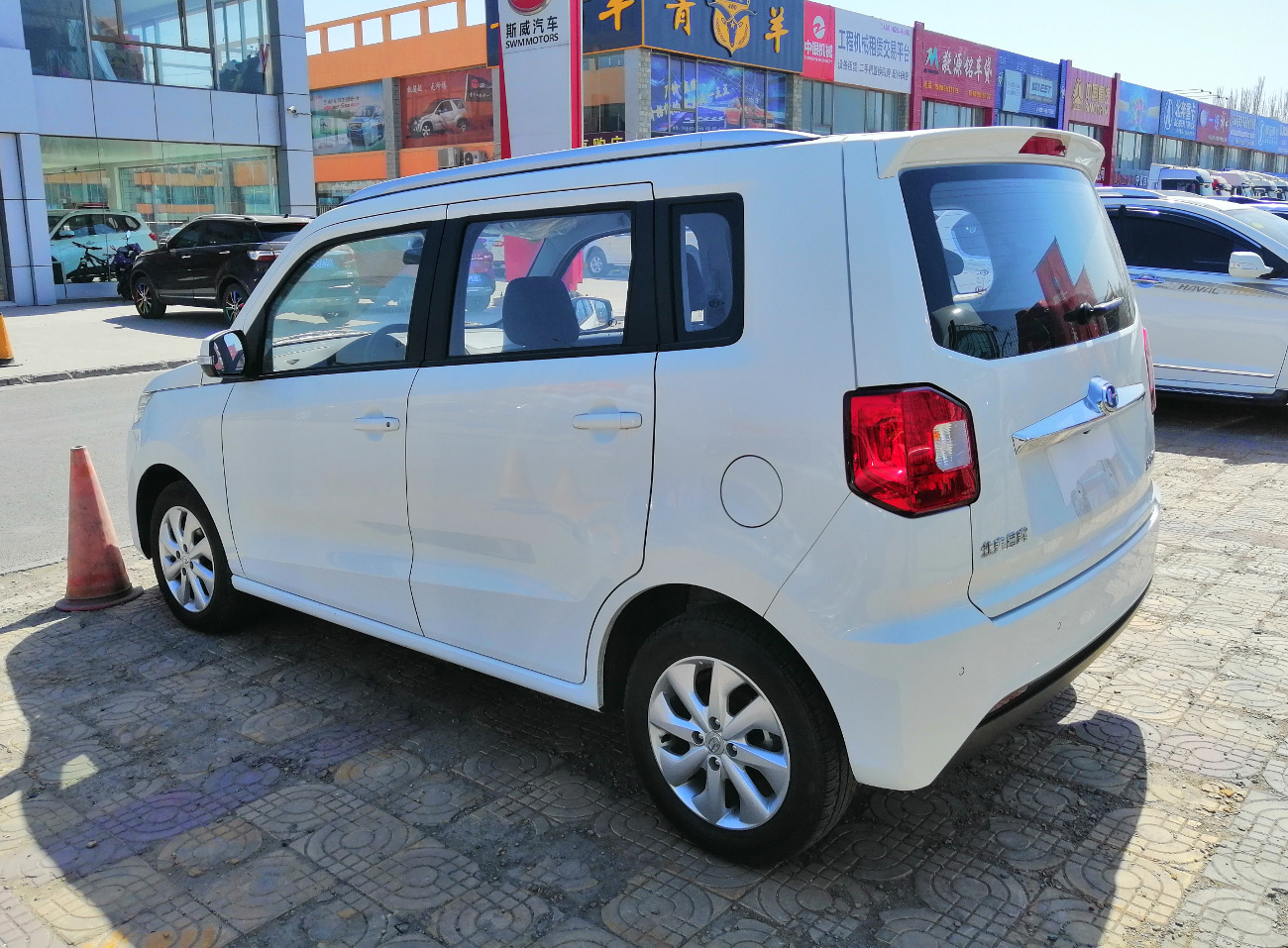
Changhe Beidouxing (rear)

The Changhe Beidouxing II was seen in 2017, with the underpinnings still being the Suzuki Wagon R. The second generation Changhe Beidouxing is powered by the Suzuki-derived 1.4-liter engine shared with the first generation model, with the engine now tuned up to 101 horsepower. However, the actual production car was not revealed until 2019.
