= Suddha =

Suddha (lit. 'pure' in Sanskrit) can refer to:

- Suddha (film), a 2005 Indian film
- Śuddha, a Sanskrit term referring to purity in Buddhism
- Śuddha, pure tattvas in Śaivism
- Suddha medicine, in Ayurveda
- Shuddha Hindi, a form of the Hindi language

== See also ==
- Shuddhi (disambiguation)
- Suda (disambiguation)
- Suddha Dhanyasi, a raga (musical mode) of Carnatic music (South Indian classical music)
- Shuddha Saveri, a raga (musical mode) of Carnatic music (South Indian classical music)
