= Huali =

- Industry: Automotive
- Founded: 1983; 43 years ago
- Defunct: 2002
- Headquarters: Tianjin, China
- Owner: FAW Group
- Parent: FAW Tianjin
- Website: huali.com.cn

Huali (華利) was a car brand of FAW Tianjin, a member of First Automotive Works Group, which specialised in compact vehicles. Huali's first vehicle was a minibus named Dafa (see under products). Huali licensed Daihatsu models from 2003 onwards including the Happy Messenger based on the Daihatsu Move and the Dario Terios based on the Daihatsu Terios (it was later called the Zotye Nomad as well) . All products were sold under the FAW-Jiaxing brand from 2008.

== Products ==
- Huali Dafa
- Huali Happy Messenger
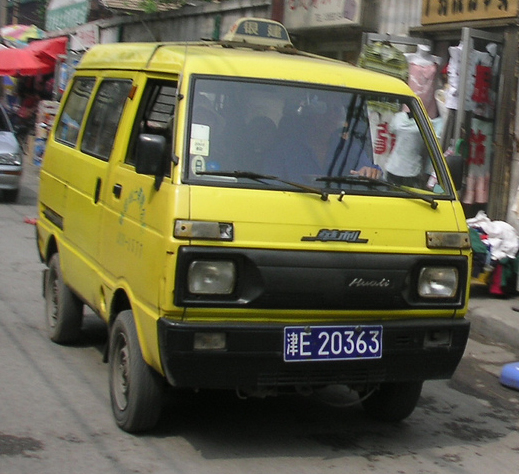
  Huali Dufa
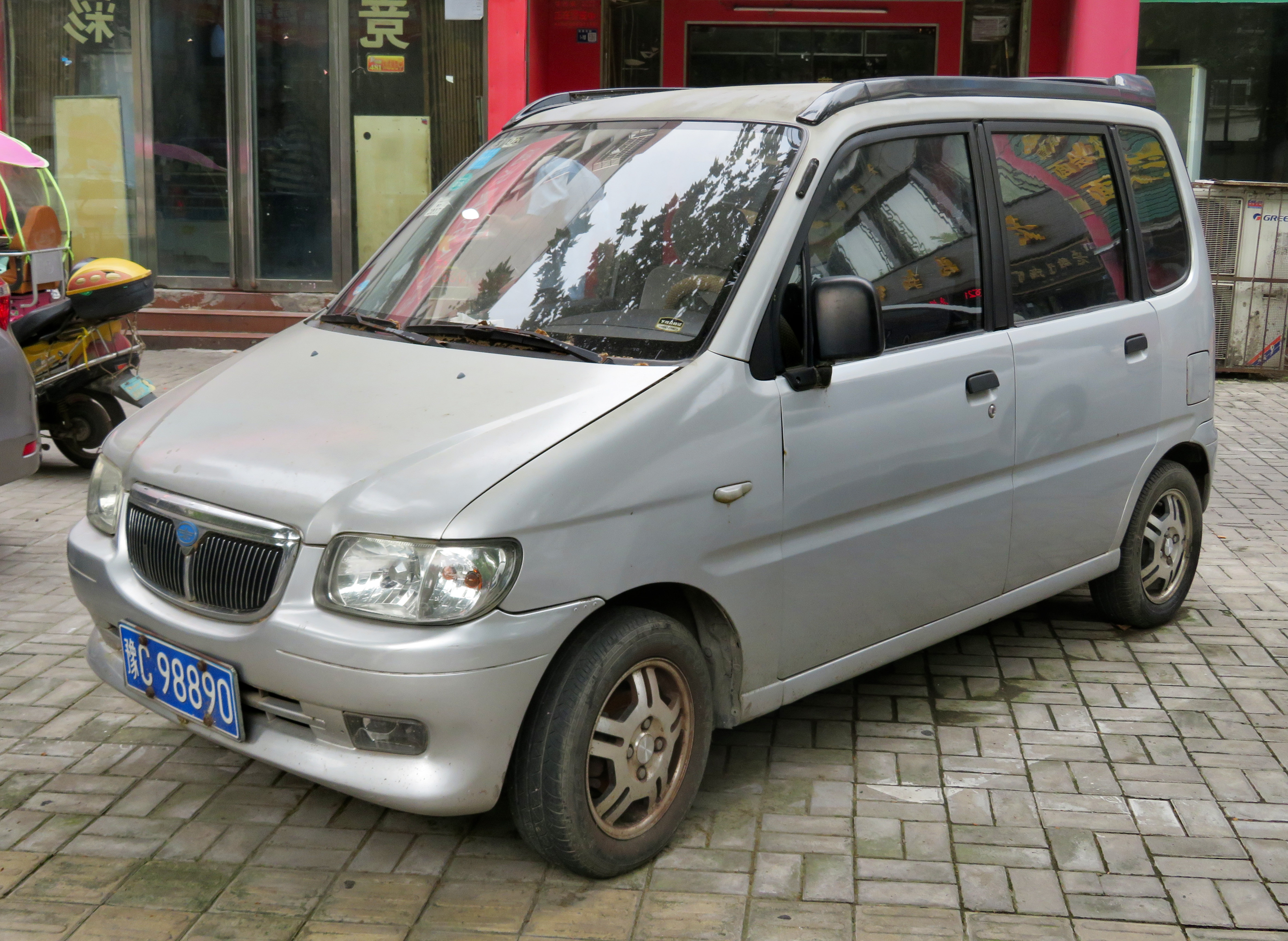
  Huali Happy Messenger
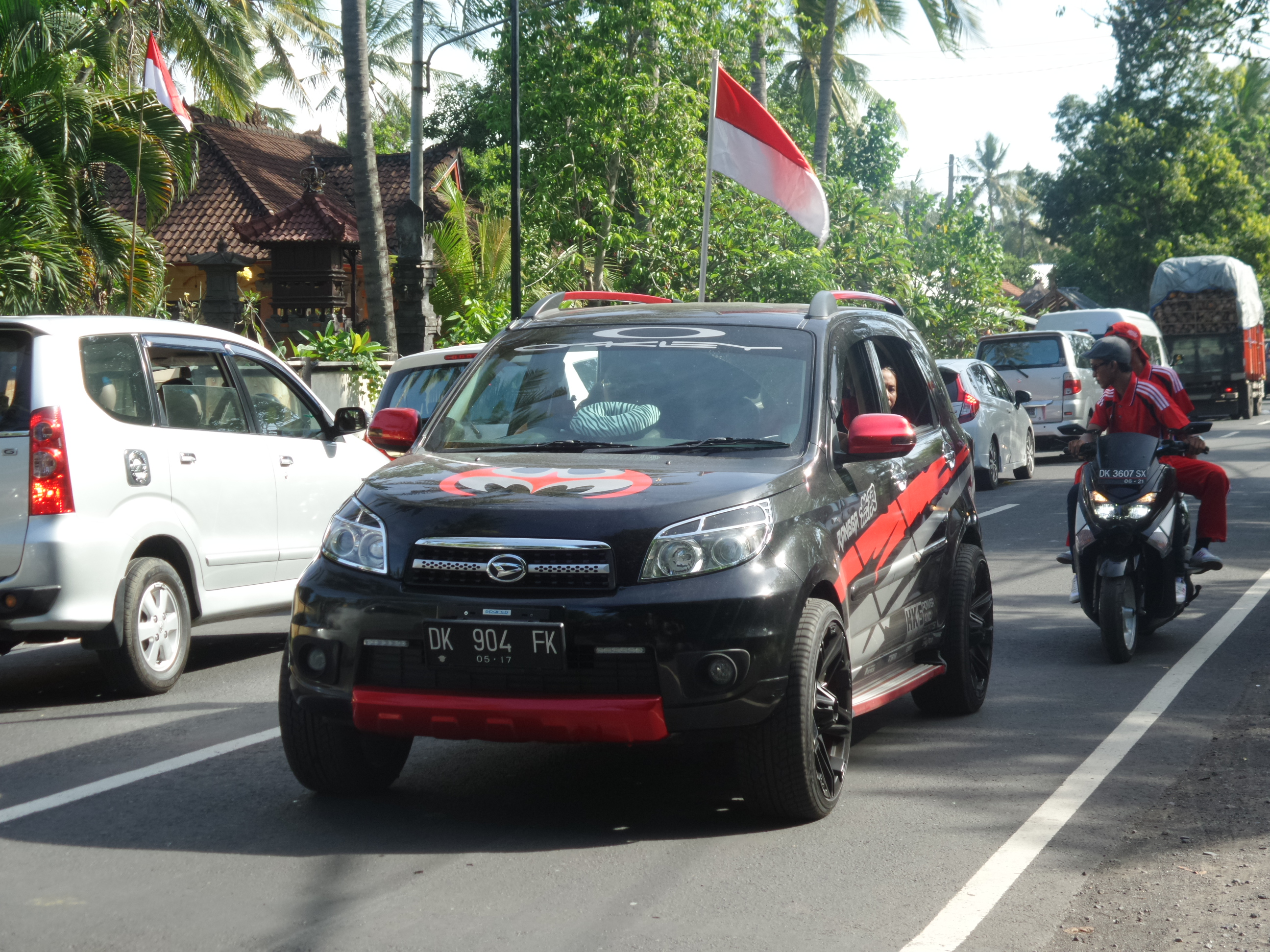
  Huali Terios
