= Sudha =

- Gender: Female
- Language: Indic languages Sanskrit

Origin
- Meaning: "living water"
- Region of origin: India

Sudha (Sanskrit : सुधा) is a Hindu/ Sanskrit Indian feminine given name meaning living water and also, in other variations, nectar.

== Notable people named Sudha ==
- Sudha (actress), Telugu actress
- Sudha Bhattacharya (born 1952), Indian academic, scientist and writer
- Sudha Chandran (born 1964), Indian actress and dancer
- Sudha Kheterpal, British-Indian musician
- Sudha Malhotra (born 1936), Indian actress and singer
- Sudha Murty (born 1950), Indian social worker and writer
- Sudha Pennathur, Indian jewellery designer and entrepreneur
- Sudha Rani (born 1973), Indian actress
- Sudha Shah (born 1958), Indian cricketer
- Sudha Shivpuri (1937–2015), Indian actress
- Sudha Singh (born 1986), Indian athlete runner
- Sudha Sundararaman (born 1958), Indian politician, activist and the central committee member of Communist Party of India
- Sudha Varghese (born 1949), Indian social worker and Catholic nun
- Sudha Yadav (born 1965), Indian politician and former member of the lower house of India's parliament Lok Sabha

== See also ==
- Suda (surname)
