= Suda Bay (ship) =

14.3 ton Australian motor boat

General characteristics
- Type: Motor boat
- Tonnage: 14.3 tons

Suda Bay was a 14.3 ton motor boat that was one of the first boats used for a commercial tourist operation in the Houtman Abrolhos.

Between 1946 and 1948, Suda Bay and Batavia Road were used by Dal Gaze and Alan Fox to transport tourists to and from the Houtman Abrolhos, especially Pelsaert Island. This represents the first known commercial tourist operation in the Houtman Abrolhos.

In 1948, the partnership between Gaze and Fox broke up, and thereafter Fox used Suda Bay for lobster fishing in the vicinity of North Island. A channel through the reefs just north of the island is today named Suda Bay Passage.
