= Brian Suda =

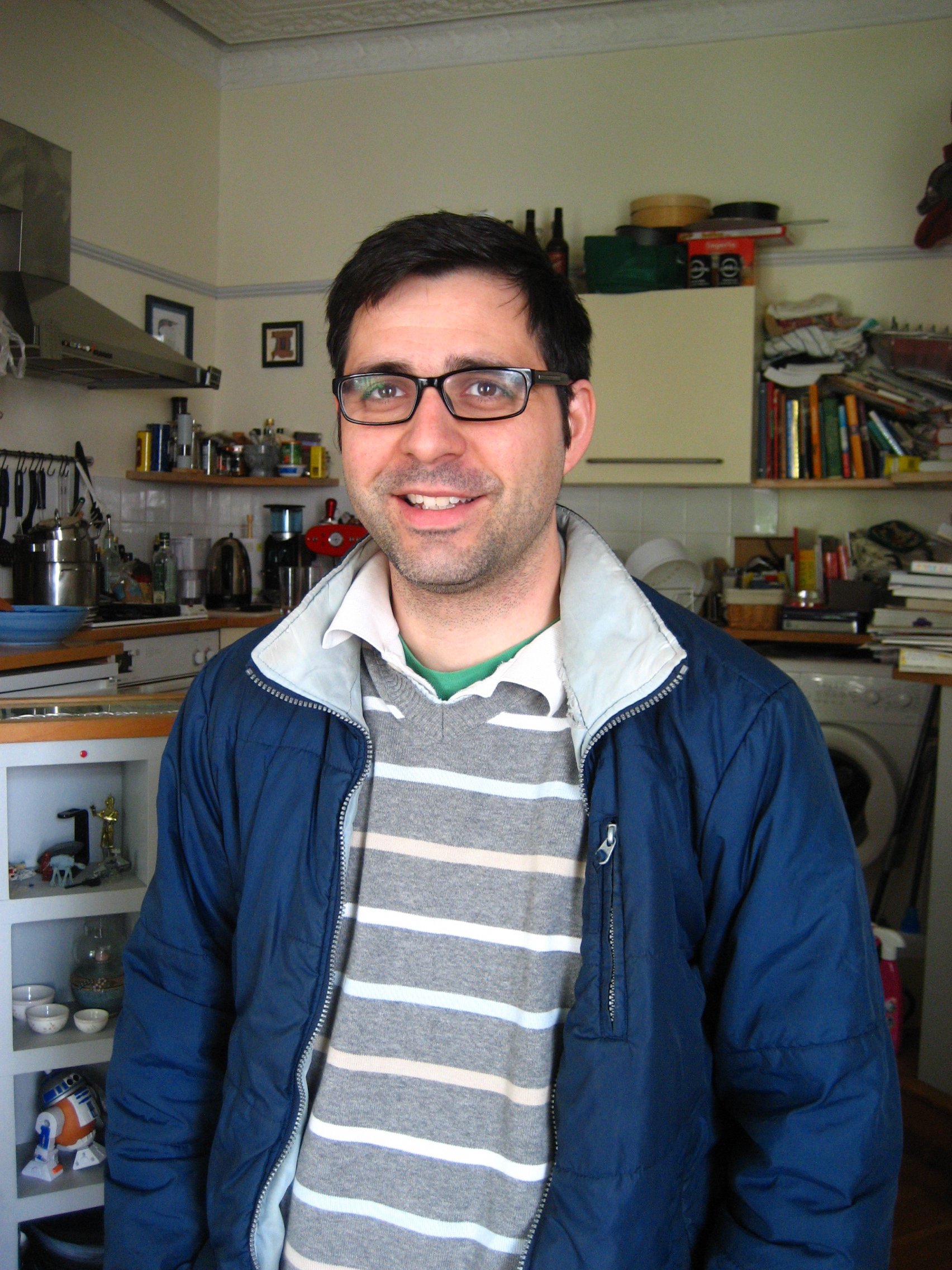
- Suda, May 2009
- Born: 29 May 1979 (age 47); St. Louis, Missouri, United States
- Education: University of Edinburgh (Informatics); Saint Louis University (Computer Science)
- Occupations: Informatician; Author

Brian Suda (born 29 May 1979 in St. Louis, Missouri) is an American informatician living in Reykjavík, Iceland.

Suda received a bachelor's degree in computer science from St. Louis University in 2001 and a master's degree in informatics from the University of Edinburgh in 2003. Much of his adult life has been spent abroad, first in Scotland and then in Iceland, where in 2008 he was one of three founders of Skólapúlsinn, a company that helps Icelandic schools measure the engagement, academic ability, and well-being of students.

Suda was an invited expert in the W3C's GRDDL working group in 2008, co-author of the hCard microformat specification, and in 2010 wrote a book, A Practical Guide to Designing with Data, published by Five Simple Steps. He has written for many online and print publications including A List Apart, Linux Format, Viðskiptablaðið, and SitePoint.
