= GreenWheel EV =

Chinese electric vehicle manufacturer

- Type: Private
- Industry: Automotive
- Founded: January 1, 2000; 26 years ago
- Founder: Liu Churui
- Headquarters: Guangdong, China
- Website: www.greenwheel.com.cn

GreenWheel EV (Chinese: 陆地方舟), full name Shenzhen Greenwheel Electric Vehicle Group Co., Ltd (深圳市陆地方舟新能源电动车集团有限公司) is a Chinese automobile manufacturer headquartered in Guangdong, China, that specializes in developing electric buses and low-speed electric vehicle or Neighborhood Electric Vehicles.

== History ==
GreenWheel EV was founded in January 2000 and is based in Guangdong, China. They started out making neighborhood electric vehicles. In May 2017, they got a permit to start selling and building highway legal vehicles. They built a 50,000 unit plant in Mingcheng Industrial Park, which costed $267 million. GreenWheel EV built a mini city called EV Valley. It includes their factory, research factory, parts integration center, a conference center, education and training center, vehicle theme park, race track, new energy museum, hotel, and electric vehicle demonstration center.

Their first vehicle was the J0 small hatchback. It was based on the Renault Zoe. It was shown in 2012, but failed to make production.

The company's second vehicle was the V5, an electric crossover. It uses a 16 kWh battery and has 47 horsepower. Its dimensions are 4045 mm/1737 mm/1643 mm, a wheelbase of 2500 mm, and a weight of 1,380 kg.

The GreenWheel EV Jummer, also called the Jimma, convertible was first shown in 2010. It was not street legal, and was mainly on golf courts. It was remade in 2014 at the China Hi-Tech Fair in Shenzhen. It was made into a Cabriolet in 2011 and a Hard Top in 2013. Its dimensions measure 3660 mm/1600 mm/1700 mm, and has a wheelbase of 2335 mm.

The JEV is a compact hatchback with 5 doors and 4 seats. Its dimensions are 4631 mm/1789 mm/1470 mm. It comes in a Basic Type, Comfortable Type, and Luxurious Type. The JEV has a 18.5 kW lead-acid battery.

== Vehicles ==
=== Current models ===
GreenWheel EV currently has 3 production vehicles.

Model	Photo	Specifications
GreenWheel EV V5		Body style: Crossover Class: M Doors: 5 Seats: 5 Battery: 16 kWh battery Production: 2017 Revealed: 2015
GreenWheel EV Jummer (GreenWheel EV Jimma)		Body style: Compact SUV Class: J Doors: 2, 3 Seats: 2 Battery: lead-acid Production: 2010 Revealed: 2010, 2014 China Hi-Tech Fair
GreenWheel EV JEV		Body style: hatchback Class: A Doors: 5 Seats: 4 Battery: 18.5 kW lead-acid Production: Revealed:

=== Commercial Use ===
GreenWheel EV has 5 public-use commercial vehicles.

Model	Specifications
GreenWheel EV 12M	Body style: Bus Usage: Bus Dimensions: 11980 mm/2530 mm/3190 mm Seats: 34 Battery: Iron phosphate lithium
GreenWheel EV Z35	Body style: Van Usage: Cargo van Dimensions: 4500 mm/1680 mm/2000 mm Seats: 2-3 Battery: 44.8 lithium
GreenWheel EV Z80	Body style: Van Usage: Cargo van Dimensions: 4405 mm/1685 mm/1910 mm Seats: 2 Battery: 42.5 lithium
GreenWheel EV 7M	Body style: Bus Usage: Bus Dimensions: 6995 mm/2160 mm/2730 mm Seats: 26 Battery: Iron phosphate lithium
GreenWheel EV Comforte	Body style: Minibus Usage: Bus Dimensions: Seats: 8 Battery:

=== Private Use ===
- GreenWheel EV RQ6700XQQ40
- GreenWheel EV RQ6100GNH5P0
- GreenWheel EV RQ6810GCH4P0
- GreenWheel EV RQ6100GCH4P0
- GreenWheel EV RQ6120GNH5P0
- GreenWheel EV RQ6900GNH5P0
- GreenWheel EV RQ6850GNH5P0
- GreenWheel EV RQ6700XCQ4P0
- GreenWheel EV RQ6120GHEVH5P0
- GreenWheel EV RQ6100GPHEVH4
- GreenWheel EV RQ5060XXYCQ40
- GreenWheel EV RQ5060XQCI-DA
- GreenWheel EV RQ5020ZXXQQ40
- GreenWheel EV RQ5020CTYBEV0
- GreenWheel EV RQ6110YEVH1
- GreenWheel EV RQ6830YEVH11
- GreenWheel EV RQ6600XEVQA
- GreenWheel EV RQ6830YEVH10
- GreenWheel EV RQ6830YEVH9
- GreenWheel EV RQ6830YEVH13
- GreenWheel EV RQ6830YEVH12
- GreenWheel EV RQ6830YEVH8
- GreenWheel EV RQ6830GEVH3
- GreenWheel EV RQ6830GEVH2
- GreenWheel EV RQ6830GEVH1
- GreenWheel EV RQ6101GEVH1
- GreenWheel EV RQ6120GEVH8
- GreenWheel EV RQ6120GEVH9
- GreenWheel EV RQ6101GEVH0
- GreenWheel EV RQ6101GEVH2
- GreenWheel EV RQ5041XXYEVZ0
- GreenWheel EV RQ5041XXYEVZ2
- GreenWheel EV RQ5041XXYEVZ1
- GreenWheel EV RQ5022XXYEVZ3
- GreenWheel EV RQ5026XXYEVH0
- GreenWheel EV RQ5022XXYEVH9
- GreenWheel EV RQ5022XXYEVHE
- GreenWheel EV RQ5022XXYEVHD

== Awards ==
- "The Best Green Controlling Prize"
- "The Best Space Award"
- "Qinghai Lake International Electric Car Challenge"
- "Shenzhen Major Project"
- "China funding support project"
- "Guangdong enterprise workstation for academician and expert"
- "Guangdong strategic emerging industry base"
- "Jiangsu new energy vehicle industry base"
- "Jiangsu workstation of business graduate student"
- "Innovative Enterprises"
- "Excellent Technology Achievements Transformation Projects"
- "Excellent Products"
- "Excellent enterprise for productivity"
- "2011 Shenzhen innovation enterprise of the culture construction"
- "2011 Shenzhen meritorious enterprise of the culture construction"
- "Boao prize, 2012 industry demonstration unit"
- "Guangdong excellent independent brand"
- "Chinese famous brand"
- "Asia famous brand"
- "2001 brand spectrum gold award"
- "The consistent quality brand"
- "The annual top ten innovative bus company"
- "The best energy saving prize of 2014 Qinghai lake international electric car challenge"

== See also ==
- ChangJiang
- Dial EV
- EV Valley
