= Qingyuan Auto =

Chinese automobile manufacturer

Qingyuan
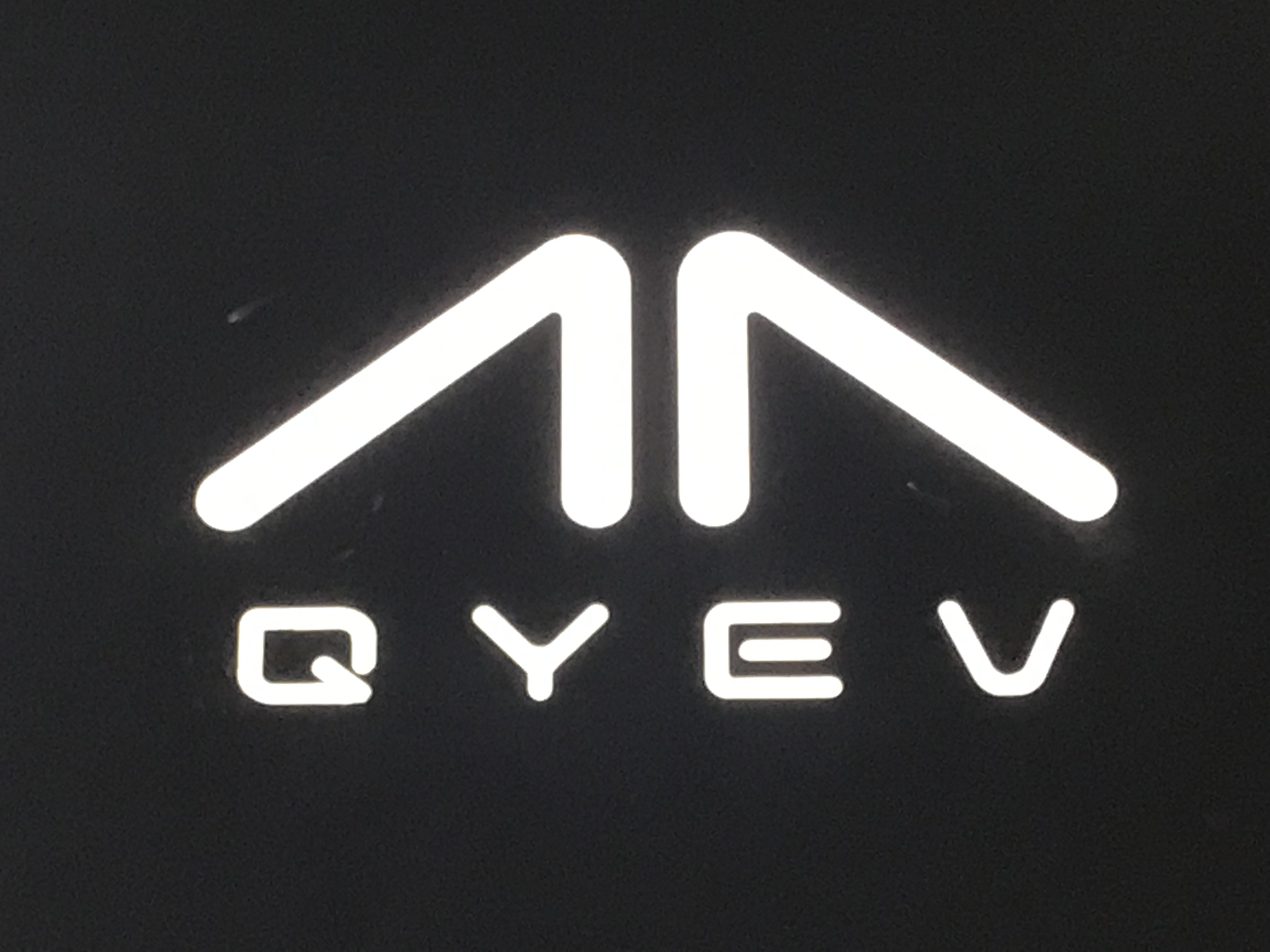
- Type: Private
- Industry: Automotive
- Founded: 2001; 25 years ago
- Headquarters: Tianjin
- Key people: Zhu Gang, Wang Xu, Bai Wenli
- Website: en.qyev.com

Qingyuan (Chinese: 清源), also called QYEV (Chinese: 电动汽车), is a Chinese automobile manufacturer headquartered in Tianjin, China, that specializes in producing electric vehicles.

== History ==
Qingyuan was founded in 2001, and is based in Tianjian. It was the first Chinese automotive brand to export vehicles. They built their first production line factory in 2008. In 2006, they created the world's first electric vehicle crash test. They have a total of 100 city service centers and 200 dealerships in Tianjin, Hebei, Shandong, Henan, Jiangsu, Hubei, Hunan, Shanxi, and Chongqing. They have exported vehicles to other Asian countries and Britain.

Qingyuan's first car was the Bende in 2001. It is a rebadged licensed production of the Chrysler Neon LS. Its second vehicle was the Qingyuan S60 created in 2005, essentially a rebadged Miles ZS40S. They attempted to produce more vehicles with licensed rebadges of Hafei models from 2006 to 2014, all of which unsuccessful. They made the B6 based on the Hafei Saibao), T5 (also a rebadged Hafei), and the A0 (rebadged Miles Electric Vehicles product). The Qingyuan Y01A SUV went in production from 2018 to 2019.

They have also attempted to create many self-driving vehicles, including a minibus, tour bus, shuttle bus, sterilizing vehicle, distribution vehicle, and street sweeper.

The company's first successful vehicle was the Xiaozun. It is a small hatchback, and was shown at the 2019 Auto Shanghai. It uses a lithium-ion battery and has a range of 400 km. It includes driver-assist features such as low-speed pedestrian warning, driver fatigue warning, and a TMPS tire pressure detection system. Its dimensions are 3400 mm/1695 mm/1560 mm, and a wheelbase of 2250 mm.

The Qingyuan Zun was introduced at the 2019 Shanghai Auto Show, as a concept vehicle. The Zun is also called the Qingyuan Zunzhe. It has a Level 4 self driving system. The car has a wheelbase of 3500 mm, and dimensions measuring 5500 mm/2150 mm/1650 mm.

The W01 is a compact self-driving hatchback. It has no steering wheel, pedals, and shifting. It has an autonomous level of L4.

== Vehicles ==
=== Current models ===
Qingyaun currently has 1 production vehicles.

| Model | Photo | Specifications |
|---|---|---|
| Qingyuan Xiaozun | | Body style: Hatchback Class: A Doors: 3 Seats: 4 Battery: Lithium-ion Production: 2020–present Revealed: 2019 Auto Shanghai |

=== Concept Vehicles ===
| Model | Photo | Specifications |
|---|---|---|
| Qingyuan Zun/Zunzhe | | Body style: fastback crossover Class: Doors: 4 Seats: 4 Battery: lithium battery Revealed: 2019 Shanghai Auto Show |
| Qingyuan W01 | | Body style: Hatchback Class: A Doors: 3 Seats: 2 Battery: Revealed: Still in workshop |

=== Commercial Use ===
| Model | Specifications |
|---|---|
| Qingyuan Tongrui | Body style: Box truck Usage: Cargo van Dimensions: 18m³ body Seats: 2 Battery: lithium iron phosphate |
| Qingyuan QY35 | Body style: Van Usage: Cargo van Dimensions: 2.3m³ body Seats: 2 Battery: 30kwh lithium manganate |
| Qingyuan Armored Spherical Cabin | Body style: Police car Usage: Anti-riot police work Dimensions: Seats: 1-2 Battery: 15 kWh |
| Qingyuan Baoqi | Body style: Van Usage: Cargo van Dimensions: 3480 mm/1455 mm/1670 mm Seats: 2 Battery: 5 kW |

=== Private Use ===
==== Van ====
- Qingyuan QY5030XXYBEVYL
- Qingyuan QY5022XXYBEVYL
- Qingyuan QY5020XXYBEVYL
- Qingyuan QY5020XXYBEVEL
- Qingyuan QY5021XXYBEVYL
- Qingyuan QY5021XXYBEVYC
- Qingyuan QY5020XXYBEVYC
- Qingyuan QY5020XFWBEVEL
- Qingyuan QY5020XFWBEVEC
- Qingyuan QY5020XYZBEVEL
- Qingyuan QY5020XYZBEVEC
- Qingyuan QY5021XYZBEVEL

==== Garbage Truck ====
- Qingyuan QY5020ZLJBEVYL
- Qingyuan QY5021ZLJBEVYL
- Qingyuan QY5021ZLJBEVYC
- Qingyuan QY5020ZLJBEVYC
- Qingyuan QY5030ZZZBEVYL
- Qingyuan QY5022ZLJBEVYL

==== Maintenance Truck ====
- Qingyuan QY5031TYHBEVYL
- Qingyuan QY5030TYHBEVYL
- Qingyuan QY5030TSLBEVYL
- Qingyuan QY5020JGK
- Qingyuan QY5020GKC-08BEVA

== See also ==
- Techrules
- Levdeo
- Aoxin
