= Souda (company) =

Design studio based in Brooklyn, New York

- Industry: Design
- Founded: 2012
- Founder: Luft Tanaka, Shaun Kasperbauer, Isaac Friedman-Helman
- Headquarters: Brooklyn, New York
- Products: Furniture, lighting and accessories
- Website: https://soudasouda.com/

Souda (pronounced “soh-duh”) is a design studio based in Brooklyn, New York, specializing in modern furniture, lighting and accessories. The studio was named as one of the “coolest design companies” at the International Contemporary Furniture Fair (ICFF) 2013 by Complex Magazine, and was awarded the Editors Choice Award for Best New Design Studio in 2014 at the ICFF.

== History ==
Souda was founded in 2012 by Parsons School of Design graduates Luft Tanaka, Shaun Kasperbauer, and Isaac Friedman-Helman, who later became the creative director at the design startup WorkOf. Since its founding, the studio has been housed in a former nightclub they found via Craiglist, located in Bushwick, Brooklyn.

Named for a Japanese word that loosely translates to mean "oh, yeah” or "aha!", the design studio's name sounds like "the carbonated soft drink", as written in Brooklyn Magazine.

== Products ==
Souda's products include the Bubble Chandelier, a light made from recycled plastic bottles, the Kreten Side Tables and Candelabra, an “industrial, organic, and sculptural” series made from a unique concrete casting method, the Strut Shelves, the Kawa (a Japanese word for "skin" or "leather") pendant lights, and the Ettore Sottsass-inspired ‘Sass Series’ made from wooden bases and marble tops.

In the 2014 Architectural Digest Home Design Show, the studio presented porcelain bowls, pendant lights slipcasted in recyclable leather molds, and a shelving unit inspired by the construction of initial aircraft carriers and the Manhattan Bridge.
