= Suda Bay Passage =

Suda Bay Passage is a channel through reef just north of North Island in the Houtman Abrolhos. Located at 28°17′29″S 113°36′35″E, it is named after the Suda Bay, which was used for lobster fishing around North Island in the late 1940s.
