= Sudha Sundararaman =

Indian politician (born 1958)

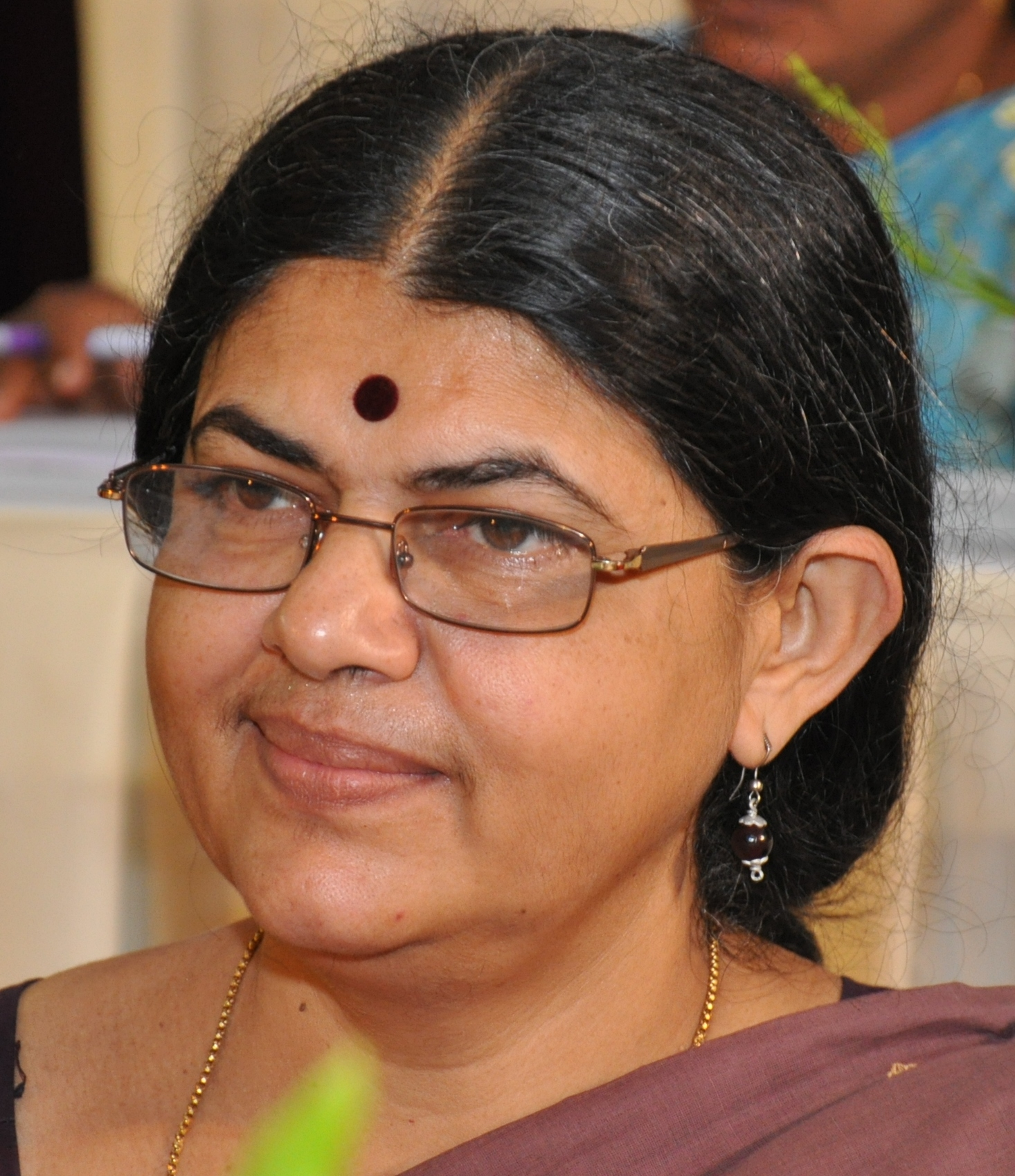
- Sudha Sundararaman

General Secretary, All India Democratic Women's Association

Personal details
- Born: 1958 (age 67–68)
- Party: Communist Party of India (Marxist)
- As of 27 January, 2007

Sudha Sundararaman (born 1958) is an Indian politician and the central committee member of Communist Party of India (Marxist). As of 2014, she is the general secretary of All India Democratic Women's Association.

== Biography ==
Sundararaman became interested in the Students' Federation of India, a student wing of Communist Party of India (Marxist), while she was a student of English literature at Ethiraj College for Women, Chennai. After her graduation, she completed a Master of Philosophy and started her career as a school teacher. Sundararaman married one of her friends. During this time, she involved herself in activities such as saving women victims from violence against them. Following that, she quit her teaching job and joined All India Democratic Women's Association (AIDWA), the women's wing of the Communist Party of India (Marxist). In 1995, Sundararaman was appointed the general secretary of AIDWA Tamil Nadu and continued to hold the position till 2001.

Sundararaman challenged the opposition to passing the Women's Reservation Bill which proposes to amend the Constitution of India to reserve 1/3 of all seats in the lower house of Parliament of India and in all state legislative assemblies for women.
