= Miles Electric Vehicles =

All-electric vehicle manufacturer and distributor

- Type: Privately held company
- Industry: Automotive industry
- Founded: 2004
- Founder: Miles Rubin
- Defunct: June 11, 2013
- Headquarters: Santa Monica, California, United States
- Key people: Kevin Czinger, Kevin Kiley
- Parent: Miles Automotive Group, Ltd.
- Website: www.milesev.com

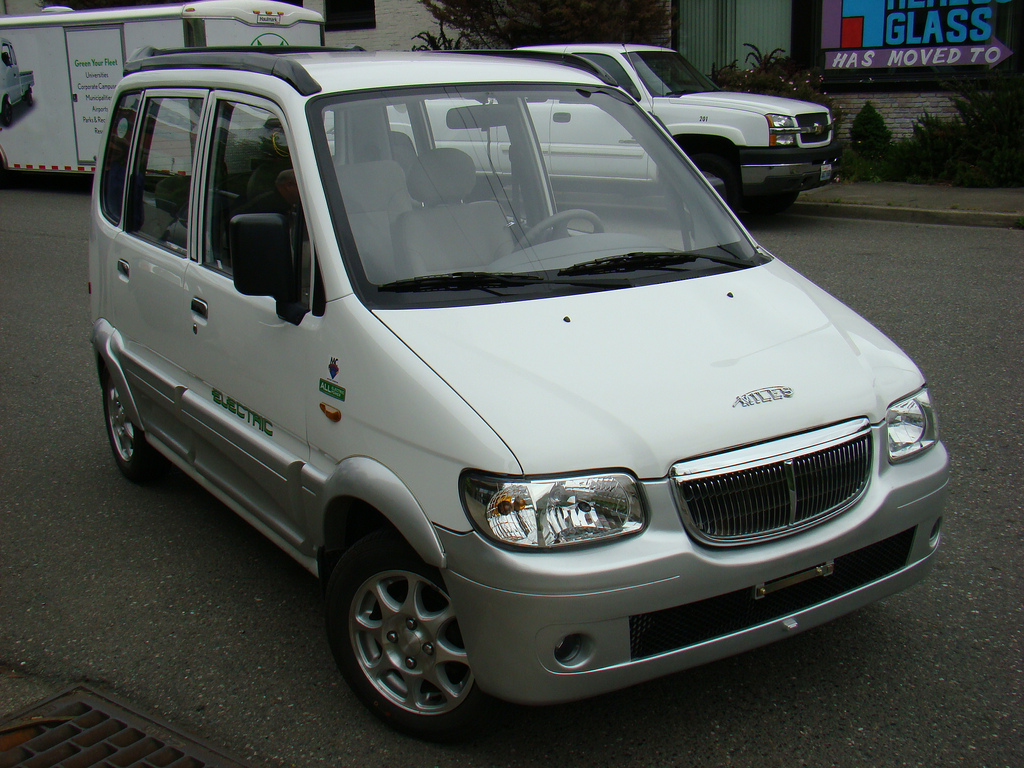
Miles ZX40S electric car

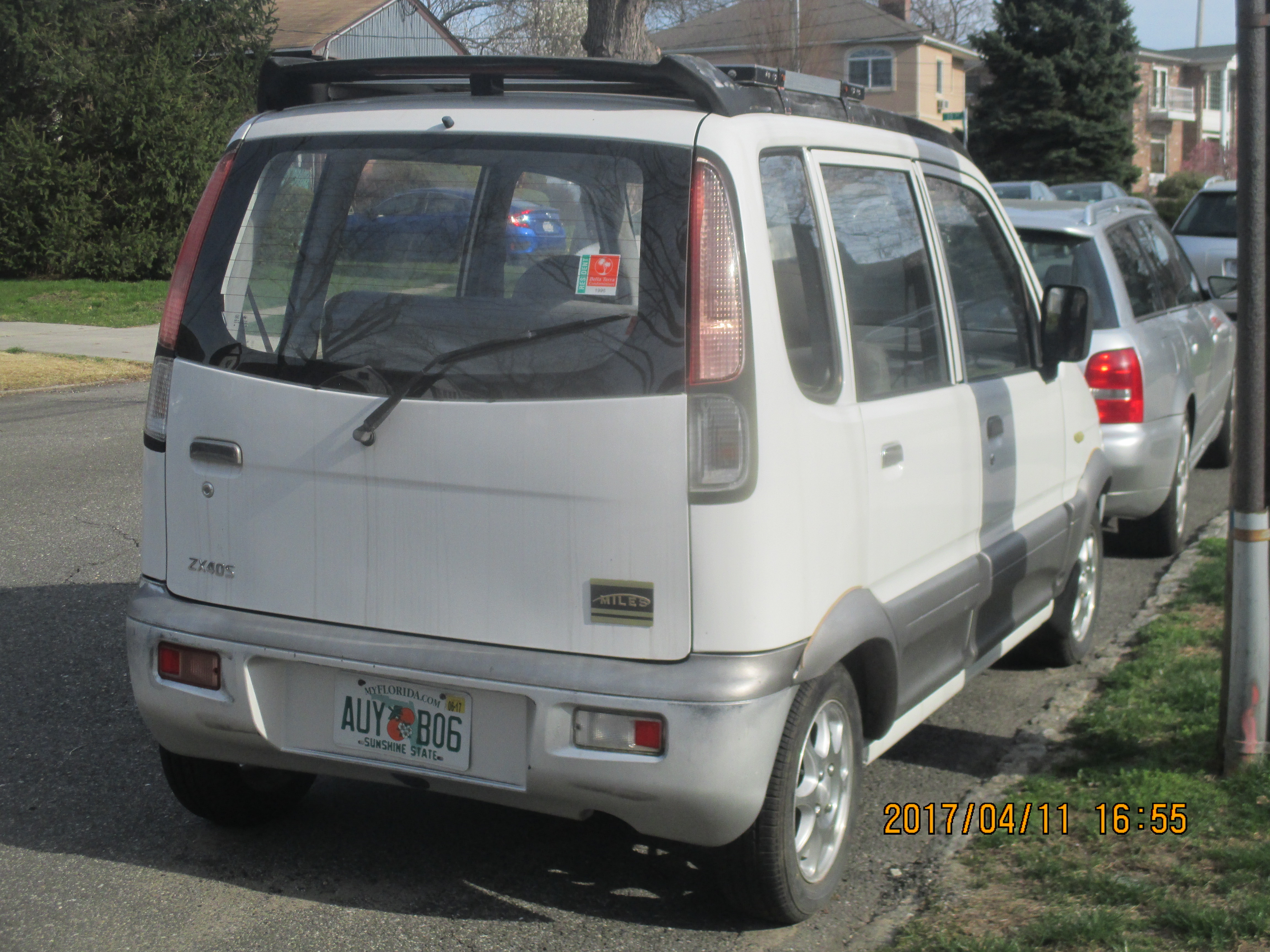

Miles Electric Vehicles was a manufacturer and distributor of all-electric vehicles manufactured by FAW Tianjin in China that met international car safety standards. Miles was given the "Electric Car Company of 2007" award by Good Clean Tech. The company filed for bankruptcy on June 11, 2013.

== History ==
Miles Electric Vehicles was based in Los Angeles, California, with several facilities throughout the United States. It was privately held by "Green" magnate Miles Rubin. The company gained prominence in 2005 when it began sales of the ZX40, the first street-legal Chinese-made automobile sold in the United States. The company's vehicles, built on steel unibody chassis, are the world's first crash tested NEVs that achieved United States Department of Transportation (DOT), California Air Resources Board and National Highway Traffic Safety Administration (NHTSA) compliance.

The company offered four electric vehicles that were designed primarily for low-speed fleet use, the ZX40, ZX40S, ZX40S Advanced Design, and ZX40ST electric truck. These were available in the United States and were used by organizations such as NASA, the U.S. Navy, Yale University, Rice University, Stanford University, UCLA, California Polytechnic State University, the San Francisco Airport Authority, Bennington College and Provo, Utah.

All Miles Electric Vehicles were DOT/NHTSA Federal Standard 500 compliant, offering steel chassis, steel impact-resistant frame, steel doors and DOT-approved glass throughout.

NHTSA/FMVSS Standard 500 law requires all low-speed vehicles (LSV) be electronically limited to 25 mph (40 km/h), and are street legal for use on roads with posted speed limits up to 35 mph (56 km/h).

Miles electric vehicles use wet cell lead acid deep cycle batteries weighing 100.5 pounds each. These are similar to the batteries found in older forklifts and vintage electric golf carts.

== AC motors ==
For the 2008 model year, Miles introduced AC (alternating current) motors for its low-speed vehicles. The three phase, brushless AC induction motor offers four times the available power of typical DC motors, and has a 100,000+ mile estimated lifetime (yet to be warranted by the company). The AC motors are paired to Curtis-Albright AC Motor Controllers and optimized for hill climbing performance.

Miles had produced an "Advanced Design" version of its flagship LSV, the ZX40S Advanced Design to use the motor, as well as using the motor in all versions of its ZX40ST work truck. Along with the AC motor upgrade, these two models come with regenerative braking and vacuum assisted braking pumps. Due to the increase in available power from the AC motor, the two vehicles also offer air conditioning and heat as an option.

== Models ==
=== ZX40ST Electric Truck ===
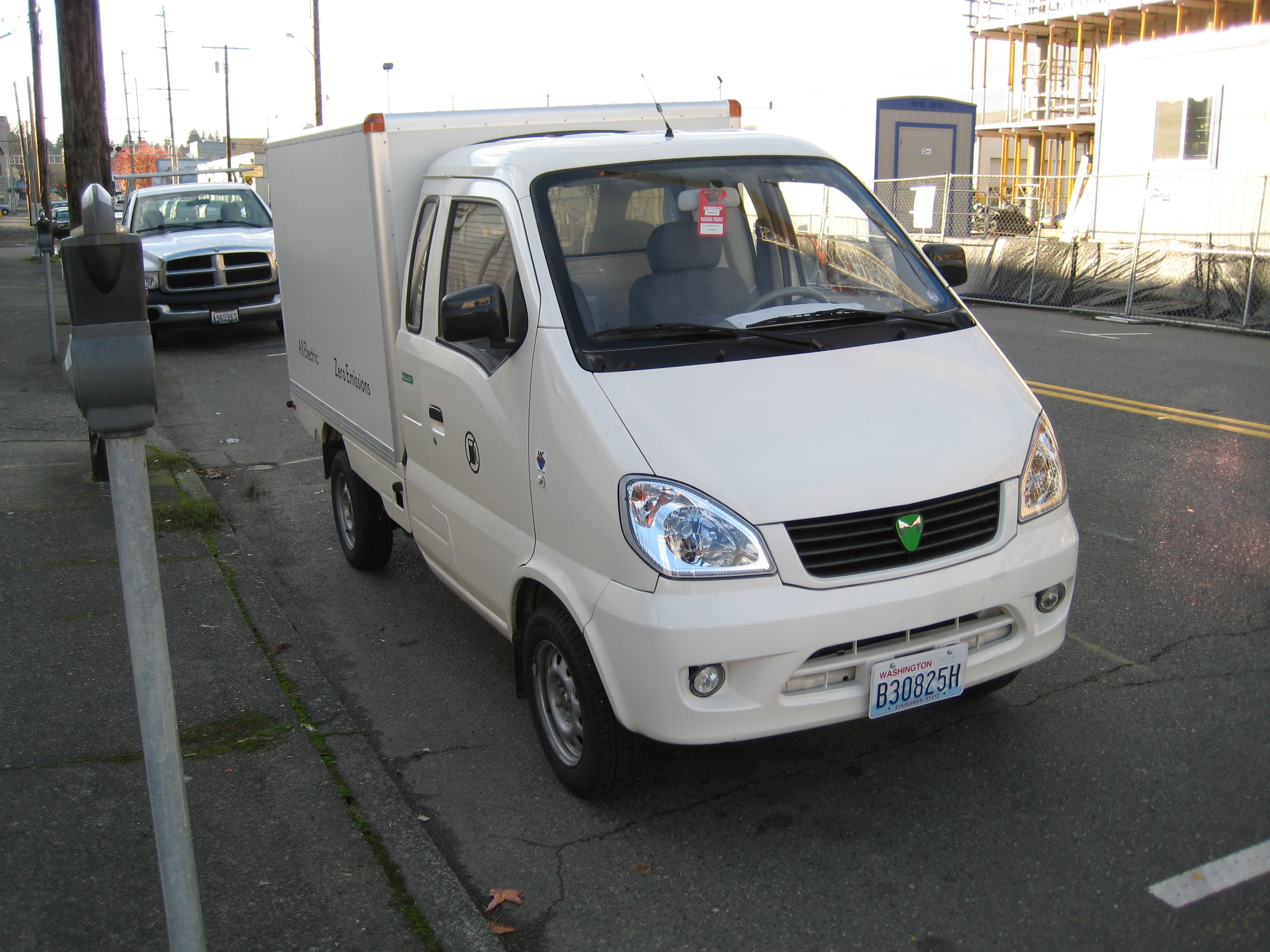
Miles ZX40ST electric 001.

The most powerful "fleet" electric utility truck on the market debuted at FedFleet '07 in Orlando in the summer of 2007. It is a version of the Hafei Minyi Pick-up. The truck is governed to a maximum speed of 25 miles (40 km) an hour and was claimed to travel 50–60 miles per charge. Like the ZX40S Advanced Design, this truck also uses an advanced three phase, brushless, AC induction motor, which comes standard with regenerative braking and optional air conditioning. MSRP $19,900. Sealed electrical connections, splash guards and weatherproof motors were options to add on. Daily users and independent tests found the actual vehicle range to be 21 to 24 miles per charge.

=== ZX40 ===
The Miles Electric Vehicles ZX40 is a subcompact electric car built by FAW Tianjin (Tianjin-Qingyuan Electric Vehicle Co), a subsidiary of the First Automotive Works in Tianjin, China. The car is a licensed version of the Japanese Daihatsu Move mini-compact and is sold in China as the Huali Happy Messenger. Miles took vehicles without drivetrains and added the motor and electrical components.

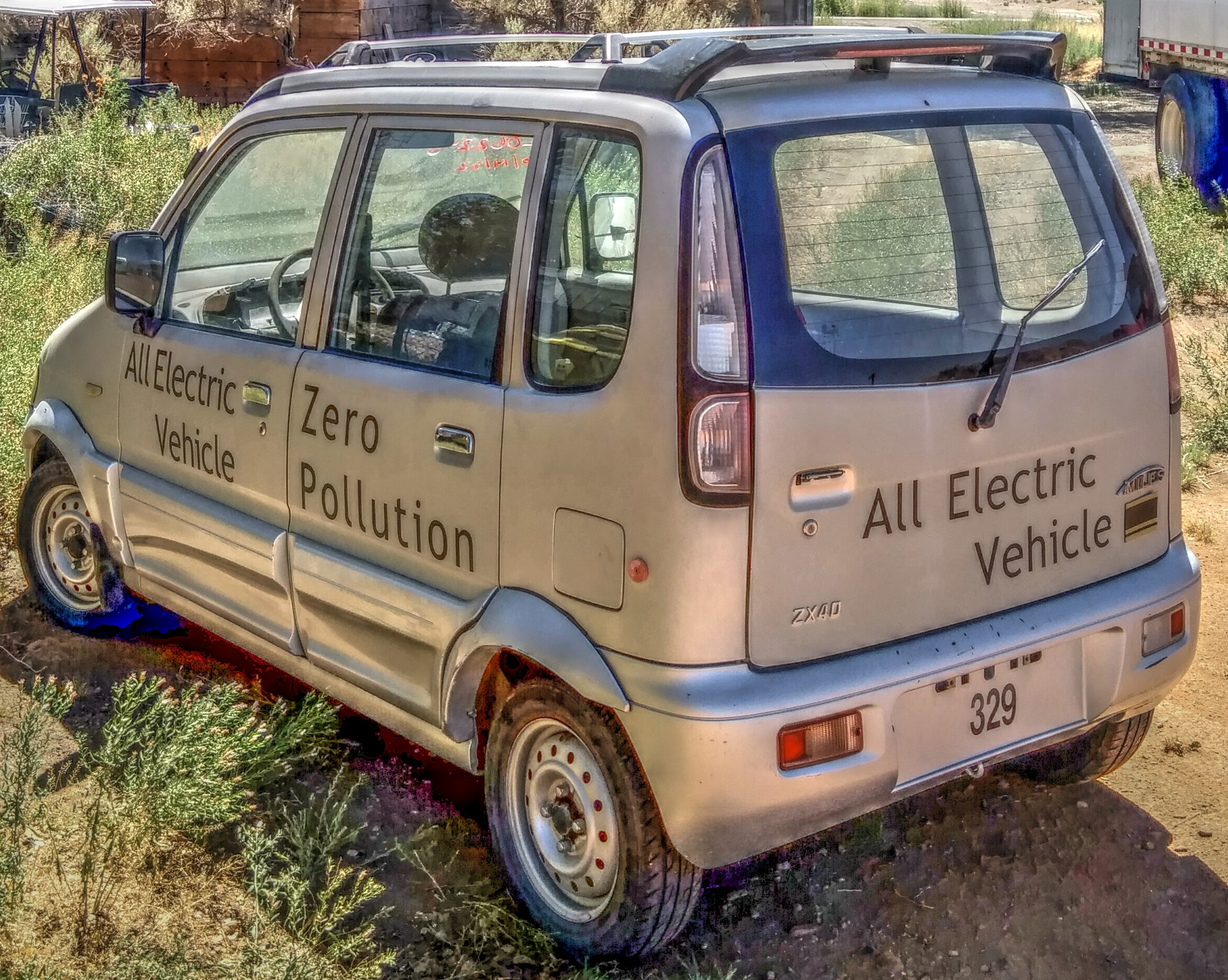
A first-Gen. 2006 Miles ZX40 48-Volt electric car.

It is powered by a single 48-volt electric motor, which produces 4.2 kW (5.6 hp) and uses a 150-amp-hour battery pack. The car uses an on-board charger that charges through a standard 120-volt outlet. An empty battery fully charges in twelve hours, but only four to six hours are needed to charge it fully if the car is less than 80% empty. The ZX40 was claimed to travel up to 64 km (40 mi) at speeds limited to 40 km/h (25 mph). It is a 2- or 4-seat car and is DOT-approved for street use.

The ZX40 was discontinued for the 2008 model year, in favor of the more powerful ZX40S and AC Motor-powered ZX40S Advanced Design.

=== ZX40S ===
The ZX40S is designed to accelerate faster than the ZX40. It is powered by a 72-volt system instead of a 48-volt system, which extends its claimed range to 50–60 miles (80–96 km). To comply with federal law, the ZX40S is also electronically speed-limited to 25 mph (40 km/h) like the ZX40 (except in certain states where electric vehicles which meet federal safety standards are allowed to operate up to 35 mph (56 km/h) as Medium Speed Electric Vehicles).

The ZX40 and ZX40S are classified as "low-speed vehicles", meaning they have fewer regulations to comply with. Such vehicles must include standard lighting and seat-belts, but do not require passive restraints, typically airbags in higher-speed vehicles. The vehicles should not exceed 25 mph (40 km/h) on streets with posted speed limits of 35 mph (56 km/h) or less. These vehicles also fall under the Washington State speed exemption cited above and may be operated up to 35 mph (56 km/h).

=== ZX40S Advanced Design ===
This vehicle uses the same body as the two above models, but uses an AC induction motor that was said to offer greater power and torque, extended lifetime, and regenerative braking.

=== OR70 ===
Miles Electric Vehicles also made the OR70, a variant of which travels above 35 mph (56 km/h), but it is not legal on public roads. NASA employed this model as their campuses are exempt from this particular law. Due to consistently poor performance the company had reported the suspension of OR70 model production from the 2008 model year onwards.

== Bankruptcy ==
On June 11, 2013, the company declared bankruptcy in U.S. Bankruptcy Court, District of Delaware. It listed estimated assets in the range of $10 million to $50 million, and estimated liabilities of between $50 million and $100 million. This has left current users without a dealer network, technical support or a parts source. Many fleet operators are forced to cannibalize some of their vehicles in order to keep others on the road.

== See also ==
- Coda Automotive
