= Dial EV =

Chinese automobile manufacturer headquartered in Weinan, Shaanxi

- Type: Private
- Industry: Automotive
- Founded: November 2017; 8 years ago
- Founder: He Kun
- Headquarters: Weinan, Shaanxi, China
- Key people: Wang Dunming (VP), Cai Feng (VP)
- Website: www.dialev.ltd

Dial EV (simplified Chinese: 帝亚一维; traditional Chinese: 帝亞一維; pinyin: Dì yà yī wéi), known for its products, Dmazing (Chinese: 帝行; Chinese: 帝行; pinyin: Dì xíng) and Dia One (Chinese: 帝亚一号; simplified Chinese: 帝亚一号; traditional Chinese: 帝亞一號; pinyin: Dì yà yī hào), is a Chinese automobile manufacturer headquartered in Weinan, Shaanxi, China, specializing in developing electric vehicles.

== History ==
Dial EV was founded in November 2017 and is based in Weinan, Shaanxi, China. Dial EV was funded by Jiangsu Yueda Ventures, IDG Capital, Unicom Tianyi, Alte Automotive, and Huashangtiande. They build a 98 hectare 50,000 unit capacity plant at Weinan, Shaanxi. The plant was constructed at the cost of ¥1.97 billion and was finished in late 2018. The company planned to develop 5 to 6 models by 2023, covering A-level, A0 level, A00 level and other segments.

Dial EV's first vehicle was the Empire. The original name for the car was the Dial EV Di Xing. It was shown at the 2017 Global Future Mobility Top Forum & International Exhibition and the company's opening event in 2018. It has 3 doors and 2 seats, and is built on the 1D platform. It costs ¥ 150,000 to ¥ 200,000.

Their second vehicle was the Xvista VC3. It was shown at the 2018 Xi'an EV Show. It has 4 doors and 4 seats. It also is built on the 1D platform, and reflects the company's 6S standard (Small, Strong, Standard, Safe, Service, Smart). It takes 5 hours to fully charge.

The Dial EV Xiaowei is the company's third vehicle, which was shown at the 2018 Xi'an EV Show.

== Vehicles ==
=== Current models ===
Dial EV currently has 3 production vehicles.

Model	Photo	Specifications
Dial EV Dmazing (Dial EV Di Xing)		Body style: SUV Class: J Doors: 3 Seats: 2 Battery: Lithium-ion Production: 2020–present Revealed: 2017 Global Future Mobility Top Forum & International Exhibition
Dial EV Xvista VC3		Body style: hatchback Class: A Doors: 4 Seats: 4 Battery: Lithium-ion Production: 2020 Revealed: 2018 Xi'an EV Show
Dial EV Xiaowei		Body style: hatchback Class: A Doors: 5 Seats: 4 Battery: Lithium-ion Production: 2020 Revealed: 2018 Xi'an EV Show

== See also ==
- Aoxin
- Min'an Electric
- ChangJiang
