= Automobile manufacturers and brands of China =

There are currently about 150 active automobile brands in China, the country with the largest automotive industry in the world. Among them are 97 Chinese domestic brands and 43 joint venture (JV) brands. Until 2010, the traditional "Big Four" were the major state-owned car manufacturers: SAIC, FAW, Dongfeng and Changan. Other Chinese car manufacturers, both from public and private sectors, like Geely, BAIC, BYD, Chery, GAC, Great Wall, JAC and Seres, emerged as the major players with the expansion of the Chinese automotive industry.

== Major manufacturers and brands ==
Chinese major automobile manufacturers headquarter locations

=== Central state-owned manufacturers ===
Central state-owned manufacturer refers to manufacturers directly owned by the State-owned Assets Supervision and Administration Commission of the State Council (SASAC) of the People's Republic of China. Currently, FAW, Dongfeng and Changan are owned and controlled by the Central Government. According to the civil service ranks of China, the central government controlled state-owned enterprises are ranked as Sub-Ministerial-Level Enterprise.

- FAW (China First Automobile Works Group Corporation, 中国第一汽车集团有限公司) is a central state-owned automotive manufacturing company headquartered in Changchun which is directly under the control of the central government of China. Founded on 15 July 1953, it is the oldest car manufacturer of the People's Republic of China. Currently FAW sells products under their brands including Hongqi, Jiefang, Bestune and Yueyi. FAW also operates joint ventures with Toyota, Volkswagen and Audi.
- Dongfeng (Dongfeng Motor Corporation, 东风汽车集团有限公司) is a central state-owned automobile manufacturer headquartered in Wuhan, Hubei, which is directly under the control of the central government of China. Originally known as Second Automobile Works when it was founded in 1969, FAW and SAW were the two major manufacturers before the reform and opening up of China. It currently owns Voyah, M-Hero, Aeolus, Forthing, Dongfeng Nammi and operates joint ventures including Cummins, Honda, Nissan, Infiniti, and Stellantis (PSA Peugeot Citroën).
- Changan (China Changan Automobile Group, 中国长安汽车集团有限公司) is a central state-owned automobile manufacturer headquartered in Chongqing. It is the oldest automobile manufacturer in China, and can be traced back to 1862 during the Qing Dynasty. Changan designs, develops, manufactures and sells passenger cars sold under the Changan Auto, Deepal, Avatr and Kaicene brands. Changan operates joint venture companies Ford and Mazda.

=== Local state-owned manufacturers ===
Local state-owned manufacturers refers to manufacturers owned by the State-owned Assets Supervision and Administration Commission of local governments (instead of the State Council). Most local government-controlled manufacturers are ranked as Bureau-Director Level Enterprise or even lower level.

- SAIC (Shanghai Automotive Industry Corporation, 上海汽车集团股份有限公司) is a Chinese state-owned automotive manufacturing company headquartered in Shanghai. It is controlled by the municipal government of Shanghai. SAIC sells vehicles under a variety of brands including IM, Rising Auto, Maxus, MG, Roewe, Wuling, Baojun, and Yuejin. Joint venture brands include Buick, Chevrolet, Iveco, Volkswagen, and Audi.
- GAC (Guangzhou Automobile Corporation, 广州汽车集团股份有限公司), is a Chinese state-owned automobile manufacturer headquartered in Guangzhou and controlled by the municipal government of Guangzhou. GAC sells passenger cars under the Trumpchi, Aion, and Hyptec brands and operates foreign joint ventures with Honda and Toyota.
- BAIC (Beijing Automotive Group Co., Ltd. , 北京汽车集团有限公司), is a state-owned enterprise located in Beijing and controlled by the municipal government of Beijing. Its owns the brands of Arcfox, Beijing, Beijing Off-road, and Foton. It has foreign joint ventures with Hyundai and Mercedes-Benz.
- JAC (Anhui Jianghuai Automobile Group Corporation, 安徽江淮汽车集团股份有限公司) is a state-owned enterprise based in Hefei, Anhui Province, and controlled by the Provincial Government of Anhui. It owns the brands of JAC Motors, JAC Yiwei, JAC Refine, and collaborates with Huawei under the Maextro brand.

=== State-private mixed ownership manufacturer ===
- Chery (Chery Automobile, 奇瑞汽车股份有限公司), previous state-owned automobile manufacturer based in Anhui and controlled by the municipal government of Wuhu. It was restructured into a state-private mixed ownership manufacturer in 2025. It sells cars under the Chery, Exeed, Jetour and iCar brands. It also has a foreign joint venture with Jaguar Land Rover for the production of Jaguar and Land Rover cars in China.
- Seres (Seres Group, 赛力斯集团股份有限公司), is one of the first state-private mixed ownership manufacturer in China. Headquartered in Chongqing, it is currently co-owned by the founder's family, the state-owned company Dongfeng and municipal government of Chongqing. It used to be famous for producing light commercial vehicles and budget passenger vehicles but is transforming to produce premium electric vehicles starting in 2021, after partnering with Chinese tech giant Huawei. It owns the brands of Seres, AITO, Fengon, and DFSK.

=== Notable privately owned manufacturers ===
- BYD (BYD Auto, 比亚迪汽车有限公司), is an automobile manufacturer based in Shenzhen, founded by BYD Company which are known for their batteries. It is currently the largest electric vehicle manufacturer of the world. It operates brands such as BYD, Denza, Fangchengbao, Yangwang, and Linghui.
- Geely (Zhejiang Geely Holding Group, 浙江吉利控股集团有限公司), is one of the biggest privately owned automobile manufacturers and is headquartered in Taizhou, Zhejiang. Currently one of the fastest growing automotive groups in the world, Geely is known for its ownership of the Swedish luxury car brand Volvo Cars, its performance counterpart Polestar, and the British sports car company Lotus. It also owns the brands of Geely, Livan, Lynk & Co, Zeekr, Volvo Cars, LEVC, Farizon, Ji Yue, Proton and Smart.
- GWM (Great Wall Motor, 长城汽车股份有限公司), is a private company famous for manufacturing SUVs headquartered in Baoding, Hebei. GWM sells vehicles under the brands of Haval, Wey, Tank and Ora. It operates a joint venture called Spotlight Automotive with BMW Group to produce Mini brand electric cars.
- Leapmotor (Zhejiang Leapmotor Technology, 浙江零跑科技股份有限公司) is an EV manufacturer founded in 2015, headquartered in Hangzhou. Stellantis acquired a 20% stake in Leapmotor in 2023.
- Li Auto (Beijing Car And Home Information Technology, 北京车和家信息技术有限公司) is a manufacturer founded in 2015. It specializes in developing and manufacturing premium range-extender electric vehicles and has rapidly grown into a major player in the Chinese automobile market.
- XPeng (Guangzhou Xiaopeng Motors Technology, 广州小鹏汽车科技有限公司) is an EV manufacturer founded in 2014 and headquartered in Guangzhou. Together with Nio and Li Auto, it is one of the first EV companies in China. Volkswagen Group acquired a 5% stake in XPeng in 2023.
- Xiaomi Auto (Xiaomi Automobile Co., Ltd, 小米汽车有限公司) is the subsidiary of Chinese consumer electronics giant Xiaomi that produces EVs. It was founded in 2021 in Beijing and launched its first product, the Xiaomi SU7, in 2024. Xiaomi is currently the only Chinese tech company that is directly involved in automotive manufacturing.
- Nio (Shanghai Nio Automobile, 上海蔚来汽车有限公司) is an EV manufacturer founded in 2014 and headquartered in Shanghai. The company is noted for its battery-swapping stations and premium EV. The company launched an entry-level brand, Onvo, and the high-end brand Firefly in 2024.

Chinese major state-owned automobile groups global sales (joint venture brands excluded)
Year	Central state-owned			Local state-owned				State-private mixed owned		HIMA (Note: The sales figures of HIMA brands are overlapping with its partner manufacturers)
Year	FAW	Dongfeng	Changan	SAIC	GAC	BAIC	JAC	Chery	Seres	HIMA
2010	1,038,290	607,068	1,239,990	1,424,513	45,065	682,895	442,547	750,456	226,198	–
2011	907,337	654,991	1,025,233	1,433,387	44,056	664,812	466,459	729,497	243,053	–
2012	718,327	611,446	1,053,645	1,659,973	71,505	683,991	448,813	653,476	202,991	–
2013	723,969	709,470	1,152,537	1,884,112	124,001	866,994	495,737	561,062	205,019	–
2014	627,006	715,344	1,363,487	2,051,240	146,694	864,783	446,802	570,718	277,000	–
2015	505,849	690,531	1,504,936	2,272,961	207,890	827,170	588,052	575,108	275,316	–
2016	505,711	779,298	1,682,741	2,533,586	375,723	988,109	643,342	682,474	381,636	–
2017	572,862	810,407	1,597,543	2,811,224	508,797	837,129	510,892	604,708	400,038	–
2018	543,986	664,313	1,270,100	2,957,136	535,323	701,754	462,477	752,759	347,837	–
2019	589,832	661,585	1,331,802	2,621,117	384,792	743,614	421,241	747,806	325,381	–
2020	779,403	725,475	1,503,604	2,575,775	353,597	790,241	456,125	731,117	273,590	–
2021	846,803	819,172	1,754,707	2,845,309	447,207	760,476	524,224	961,926	266,614	–
2022	555,406	743,032	1,874,569	2,779,123	633,704	570,681	500,401	1,232,727	267,246	76,180
2023	732,328	671,702	2,097,794	2,804,845	886,508	821,033	592,499	1,881,316	253,181	95,279
2024	813,632	765,242	2,226,489	2,429,925	789,475	872,362	403,094	2,603,916	497,008	444,956
2025	940,080	866,734	2,468,197	2,948,518	613,563	1,070,000	384,071	2,806,393	516,860	589,107

Chinese major privately owned automobile groups global sales
Year	Privately owned							
Year	Geely	BYD	GWM	Leapmotor	XPeng	Li Auto	Nio	Xiaomi
2010	425,194	521,761	415,779	–	–	–	–	–
2011	857,006	454,676	518,965	–	–	–	–	–
2012	905,083	462,512	672,234	–	–	–	–	–
2013	979,691	514,188	803,449	–	–	–	–	–
2014	878,818	446,329	767,825	–	–	–	–	–
2015	1,025,287	451,868	871,315	–	–	–	–	–
2016	1,333,077	510,157	1,086,639	–	–	–	–	–
2017	1,938,057	421,158	1,085,654	–	–	–	–	–
2018	2,276,846	528,298	1,072,529	–	482	–	11,348	–
2019	2,194,145	467,960	1,097,451	1,000	16,608	1,000	20,565	–
2020	2,150,134	431,447	1,111,598	10,266	27,041	33,457	43,728	–
2021	2,189,409	749,325	1,280,993	43,121	98,155	90,491	91,429	–
2022	2,312,613	1,881,669	1,067,523	111,168	120,757	133,246	122,486	–
2023	2,790,000	3,024,417	1,230,704	144,155	141,601	376,030	160,038	–
2024	3,336,534	4,272,145	1,233,292	251,207	190,068	500,508	221,970	135,000
2025	4,116,321	4,602,436	1,323,672	596,555	429,445	406,343	326,028	410,000

=== Foreign manufacturers ===
Following the reform and opening up, from 1994 to 2018, Chinese automotive policy mandated that foreign carmakers had to establish joint ventures with a Chinese counterpart to produce vehicles in the country, with the Chinese partner owning at least 50% of the venture. This measure was implemented to protect local manufacturers and provide it with the chance to bridge the technology gap and develop their brands.

On April 17, 2018, the National Development and Reform Commission (NDRC) of China announced that foreign ownership limits on automakers would be phased out over a five-year period. On 28 July 2018, China lifted foreign ownership restrictions on new energy vehicle production, which benefited American electric car manufacturer Tesla, Inc. The company established a plant in Shanghai, becoming the first foreign automaker to open a wholly owned manufacturing facility in China. The liberalization was followed by commercial vehicles in 2020 and passenger cars in 2022. The rule prohibiting foreign automakers from setting up more than two joint ventures in China was also lifted in 2022. Therefore, it became legally possible for foreign automakers to buy out local partners from joint ventures. In 2022, BMW and Volkswagen had acquired 75% stake in their joint ventures.

==== Current foreign manufacturers ====
- Tesla
  - Gigafactory Shanghai (Tesla is the first 100% foreign-owned car manufacturer in mainland China)
- Toyota
  - Lexus Shanghai (second 100% foreign-owned car manufacturer in mainland China)
- BMW
  - BMW China (former 50–50 joint venture with Brilliance Auto Group, a majority 75% stake was acquired by BMW in 2022)
    - (Defunct) Zinoro (2013–2020)
- Volkswagen
  - Volkswagen Anhui (former 50–50 joint venture with JAC, a majority 78.52% stake was acquired by Volkswagen in 2020)
  - Audi-FAW NEV (Audi AG and Volkswagen Group hold 60% majority of stake)

== Full list ==
=== Major passenger vehicle manufacturers and marques ===
Company	Marques and subsidiaries	Foreign-branded JVs
Central state-owned manufacturers
FAW	Hongqi; Jiefang; Bestune; Yueyi	FAW-Toyota; FAW-Volkswagen (Volkswagen, Audi, Jetta)
Dongfeng	Dongfeng Motor Group (DFG): M-Hero; Voyah; Epicland; eπ Technology; eπ; Aeolus; Nammi; Dongfeng Liuzhou Motor (DFLZM): Forthing; Chenglong Motor; Dongfeng Commercial Vehicles (DFCV); Dongfeng Light Commercial Vehicles (DFAC); Dongfeng Off-road Vehicles: Dongfeng Mengshi	Dongfeng-Honda (Honda, Lingxi), Dongfeng-Nissan (Nissan, Infiniti, Venucia); Dongfeng-Peugeot Citroën
Changan	Changan (Changan Nevo); Avatr; Deepal; Kaicene	Changan Ford (Ford, Lincoln); Changan Mazda; Changan Ford NEV
Local state-owned manufacturers
SAIC	SAIC Motor Passenger Vehicle; MG Motor; Roewe; SAIC; IM Motors; Maxus/LDV; Hongyan; Sunwin; Nanjing Automobile Corporation (NAC); Yuejin; Naveco; SAIC-GM-Wuling (General Motors and Guangxi Auto); Wuling; Huajing; Baojun	SAIC-Volkswagen (Volkswagen, Audi, AUDI); SAIC-General Motors (Buick, Chevrolet, Cadillac)
GAC	Trumpchi; GAC Aion; Hyptec; Aistaland; GAC Commercial Vehicle (formerly GAC Hino)	GAC-Toyota; GAC-Honda
BAIC Group	BAIC Motor; BAIC BluePark (BJEV); Arcfox; Stelato; Beijing (formerly Senova); Beijing Off-road; Foton; Cavan	Beijing-Benz; Beijing-Hyundai
JAC Group	Maextro; JAC; JAC Refine; JAC Yiwei; Ankai	
State-private mixed ownership manufacturers
Chery	Chery (Chery New Energy, Jaecoo, Omoda, Lepas); Exeed; Jetour; iCar; Luxeed; Rely; Soueast	Chery-Jaguar Land Rover; Freelander
Seres Group	Seres Auto; AITO; Ruichi Automobiles; Seres Hubei; Fengon; DFSK	
Saidou Technology (formerly Landian)	Avia	
Privately owned manufacturers
Geely Holding Group	Geely Auto; Geely Galaxy; Geely Radar; LEVC; Livan/Maple; Proton; Zeekr; Lynk & Co; Volvo Cars; Polestar; Lotus; Smart; Farizon; Ouling; Hanma; Ji Yue	
BYD	BYD Auto: Yangwang; Denza; Fangchengbao; Linghui	
Great Wall	GWM; Haval; Wey; Tank; Ora	Spotlight (Mini)
Leapmotor	Leapmotor	
Xiaomi	Xiaomi Auto	
Li Auto	Li	
XPeng	XPeng, XPeng AeroHT	
Nio	Nio; Onvo; Firefly	

=== Major commercial vehicles manufacturer and marques ===
Company	Marques and subsidiaries
Central state-owned manufacturers
BeiBen	
Sinomach	Kama Automobile; YTO
Local state-owned manufacturers
Sinotruck Group	
Zhongtong Bus	
Shaanxi Automobile Group	
XCMG Group	
Chery Holding Group	Chery Commercial Vehicle; Karry; C&C Trucks; Chery Wanda Buses
Weichai Automotive	Yangzhou Asiastar; VGV; Enranger
State-private mixed ownership manufacturers
Zoomlion Heavy Industry	
Privately owned manufacturers
Yutong	
Sany Heavy Industry	
Dayun Group	Yuanhang Auto

=== Minor manufacturers and marques ===
Company	Marques and subsidiaries
Central state-owned manufacturers
CRRC Electric Vehicle	
CASIC	
Local state-owned manufacturers
JMCG	Jingma Motor
Kaiyi Auto	
Guangxi Auto	Wuling Motors; Linxys; Aishang
Fujian Motors Group	King Long: Higer Bus, Golden Dragon; Keyton (Fujing New Longma)
Shenyang Auto	Jinbei
Jiangling Motor Holding	
M-Hero Automotive Technology (Xiangyang)	
Haima Automobile	IT Box (majority stake)
Wanshan Special Vehicle	
Taian Special Vehicle	
Guizhou Ruiqi New Energy Automobile	Chevoo
Privately owned manufacturers
Skywell	Nanjing Golden Dragon Bus, Skyworth Auto
Joylong Automobile	
Beijing Automobile Works	BAW, 212, Reach
LinkTour	
EV House (formerly SiTech)	Gyon
Polestones (Rox)	
Weltmeister	
DeepWay	
QYEV	
Grove Hydrogen Vehicles Company	
IAT	Dial EV, Estech
BeyonCa	Honri / Hongri
Aiways (overseas market only)	Gumpert Aiways
SongSan	
Baoneng Motor	DS Automobiles (OEM only, formerly Changan PSA)
Hoann Auto	
Jemmell New Energy Automotive/Lingbox Auto	
Jenhoo Auto	
Ruixiang	
Shandong Heibao	
Sichuan Tengzhong	
Chijet Motors	Shandong Baoya
Shuguang Group	Huanghai Bus
Sunlong Bus
Shineray Group	SWM, SRM Shineray
Tianma	
Techrules	
Wanxiang	
Wuzhoulong	
Changjiang	(now sells rebadged Jenhoo cars)
Zhongyu Auto	
Zotye Auto	Jiangnan Auto, Hunkt
EEZI Technologies
ZX Auto	
Juneyao Air	Yudo
Zhejiang Plante Electric vehicle Co.	
Modern Auto	
Karlmann	
Pocco / Pengke	Ari Motors
Min'an Electric	
Mudan Auto	
Cenntro Electric Group	Avantier Motors
Songuo Motors	NeuWai Motors
Soar Automotive	
Red Star Auto	
Hybrid Kenitic	
Derry New Energy Auto	Neomor
Zhidou	
Foshan Feichi	
Victory Auto	
Zeron	
Superpanther	
Wuzheng	Feidi Motors
Aoxin	
Henrey	Xiaohu
Kandi	
Kawei Auto	
DuoLa Auto	
Fulongma Group	
Kama Automobile	

== Reversed joint ventures and cooperation ==
In the 1990s, Chinese automakers pursued Western technology through joint ventures. However, a reversal occurred in the 2020s, with Western manufacturers now seeking technological assistance from Chinese counterparts and invested in China through joint ventures. Several Chinese electric vehicle startups have leveraged their technological advantages, attracting investments from traditional Western automotive giants such as Renault-Nissan, VW, BMW, Mercedes-Benz, Toyota and Stellantis.

- Renault
  - In 2017, Renault-Nissan and Dongfeng set up a joint venture called eGT New Energy Automotive to produce an A-segment EV.
  - In August 2023, Geely and Renault signed an agreement to set up a joint venture, later named Horse Powertrain, with each entity holding 50% stake, to manufacture internal combustion engine (ICE) and hybrid powertrains for Renault vehicle with Geely's technology.
  - In July 2019, Renault Group announced a capital injection of 1 billion yuan to acquire a 50% stake in JMEV, an EV subsidiary of Jiangling Motors Corporation.
- BMW
  - In July 2018, BMW and Great Wall Motor formed the Spotlight Automotive joint venture to produce and develop Mini-branded EVs.
- Mercedes-Benz
  - In 2019, Mercedes-Benz announced the establishment of a joint venture partnership with Chinese automaker Geely. Geely acquired 50% of Smart brand to produce EVs based on Geely's SEA platform.
- Toyota
  - In 2020, Toyota announced its joint venture with Chinese manufacturer BYD. The joint venture was set to assist technical know-how for Toyota's EV development and supply the battery, electric motor and electronic control unit for Toyota's EV. Toyota bZ3, the first electric sedan of Toyota, was built under the assistance of BYD with its technology.
- Volkswagen
  - In July 2023, Audi and SAIC announced their partnership that the EV platform from IM Motors, the subsidiary of SAIC, would be introduced into Audi's electric models. In 2024, SAIC and Audi jointly announced the launch of the AUDI brand.
  - In July 2023, Volkswagen Group announced its investment of $700 million in XPeng, the EV startup venture from China, for purchasing 4.99% stake of the company. The VW will collaborate with XPeng to develop two VW brand electric models for the mid-size segment in the Chinese market in 2026.
- Ford
  - In September 2023, Ford and Changan announced to establish a new joint venture Changan Ford NEV, to produce and distribute Ford vehicles based on Changan's technology of electric vehicle. Changan holds 70% stake in the JV while Ford holds 30%.
- Stellantis
  - In October 2023, Stellantis announced its investment to Leapmotor at the price of 1.5 billion euro, acquiring 20% of Leapmotor for the support of technology to produce EVs.
  - In May 2026, Dongfeng Motor and Stellantis signed a strategic cooperation agreement with a total investment exceeding 8 billion RMB, planning to produce new energy vehicles for the Peugeot and Jeep brands at the Dongfeng Peugeot-Citroën (DPCA) Wuhan plant starting in 2027 with two off-road vehicle models under the Jeep brand will be first introduced targeting at the global market.
  - In August 2026, Dongfeng and Stellantis announced to established an joint venture called Dongfeng Stellantis Automotive Technology. The company plans to develop and produce electrified Peugeot and Jeep models for both the Chinese market and global export starting from 2027. Its equity is held by three main shareholder groups: Dongfeng Peugeot-Citroën (DPCA) holds 24.1%, Dongfeng and Stellantis each hold 13.5%, and the Wuhan local state-owned enterprises collectively hold 48.9%.
  - In November 2026, it was reported that JAC, Huawei, and Maserati will collaborate to manufacture two models, a mid-size electric SUV and a full-size electric GT. The vehicles will be built at JAC's Maextro factory. Maserati will be responsible for exterior design and chassis tuning.
- KGM
  - In November 2023, South Korean manufacturer KG Mobility (KGM) signed a cooperation with BYD, for BYD to supply battery pack and hybrid powertrain for KGM's electrified SUV and pickup truck.
  - In October 2024, KGM signed an agreement with Chery to co-develop electrified vehicles for global markets. KGM will receive the T2X platform developed by Chery.
- Tata
  - In June 2024, Jaguar Land Rover and Chery signed a letter of intent to create a new EV brand called Freelander that will be based on an EV platform from Exeed.
- Nissan
  - In November 2025, Nissan Import & Export (Guangzhou) Co., Ltd. was established. This company is the first joint venture vehicle import and export entity set up by a foreign-funded automotive company in China. Nissan holds a 60% stake, while Dongfeng Motor Group holds the remaining 40%. The Dongfeng Nissan N7 and Frontier Pro PHEV will be the first models developed locally in China for export to overseas markets.

Year	Foreign manufacturer	Chinese manufacturer	Reversed joint venture / collaboration
2017	Renault/Nissan	Dongfeng	Developing and manufacturing Renault and Dacia brand EV based on Dongfeng's technology
2017	eGT New Energy Automotive (25:25:50)		Developing and manufacturing Renault and Dacia brand EV based on Dongfeng's technology
2020	BMW	Great Wall Motor	Developing and manufacturing Mini brand EV by GWM
2020	Spotlight Automotive (50:50)		Developing and manufacturing Mini brand EV by GWM
2019	Renault	JMCG	50% of JMEV acquired by Renault; Developing and manufacturing JMEV and Mobilize brand EV
2019	JMEV (50:37)		50% of JMEV acquired by Renault; Developing and manufacturing JMEV and Mobilize brand EV
2019	Mercedes-Benz	Geely	50% of Smart brand acquired by Geely; Developing and manufacturing Smart brand EV by Geely
2019	Smart Automobile (50:50)		50% of Smart brand acquired by Geely; Developing and manufacturing Smart brand EV by Geely
2020	Toyota	BYD	Providing technical support for Toyota and supply the BYD-made battery, electric motor and electronic control unit for Toyota's EV.
2020	BYD Toyota EV Technology (50:50)		Providing technical support for Toyota and supply the BYD-made battery, electric motor and electronic control unit for Toyota's EV.
2023	Audi	SAIC	Establishing new AUDI brand; Developing and manufacturing vehicles with EV platform from IM Motors
2023	Volkswagen Group	XPeng	4.99% of XPeng acquired by VW; Rebadging/technology transfer for VW vehicles
2023	Renault	Geely	Supply of ICE and hybrid powertrains for Renault, Dacia, Nissan and Mitsubishi vehicles by Geely
2023	Horse Powertrain (50:50)		Supply of ICE and hybrid powertrains for Renault, Dacia, Nissan and Mitsubishi vehicles by Geely
2023	Ford	Changan	Developing and manufacturing Ford brand electric vehicles by Changan
2023	Changan Ford NEV (30:70)		Developing and manufacturing Ford brand electric vehicles by Changan
2023	Stellantis	Leapmotor	20% of Leapmotor acquired by Stellantis; Rebadging/technology transfer for Stellantis vehicles; Setup of joint venture for the exclusive rights to sell Leapmotor vehicles outside China
2023	Leapmotor International (51:49)		20% of Leapmotor acquired by Stellantis; Rebadging/technology transfer for Stellantis vehicles; Setup of joint venture for the exclusive rights to sell Leapmotor vehicles outside China
2023	KG Mobility	BYD	Supply of battery pack and hybrid powertrain for KGM's electrified SUV and pickup truck
2024	Jaguar Land Rover	Chery	Establishing Freelander brand; Developing and manufacturing vehicles by Chery
2024	KG Mobility	Chery	Technology transfer of Chery's T2X platform
2025	Nissan	Dongfeng	Export for Dongfeng-Nissan vehicles and components
2025	Nissan Import & Export (Guangzhou) (60:40)		Export for Dongfeng-Nissan vehicles and components
2026	Stellantis	Dongfeng	Developing and manufacturing Peugeot and Jeep brands vehicles at DPCA's plant
2026	Dongfeng	Stellantis	Establishing Dongfeng Stellantis Automotive Technology; Developing and producing electrified Peugeot and Jeep models for Chinese market and global export
2026	Dongfeng Stellantis Automotive Technology (25:25)		Establishing Dongfeng Stellantis Automotive Technology; Developing and producing electrified Peugeot and Jeep models for Chinese market and global export
2026	JAC	Stellantis	Developing and manufacturing two Maserati models by JAC

== Chinese technology industry involvement in the automotive industry ==
Since the 2020s, Chinese technology corporations such as Huawei, Baidu, and DJI, with their advanced software or hardware technological capabilities, started entering the automotive business through various approaches.

Huawei's partnership with automobile manufacturers has taken the form of three business models, from the standardized parts supply model, the "Huawei Inside" (HI) model, and the Harmony Intelligent Mobility Alliance (HIMA). Baidu and DJI have provided autonomous driving system and hardware to automotive manufacturers. Qihoo 360 invested in the Chinese EV startup company Hozon Auto. Geely collaborates with Baidu to set up joint venture brands, and acquired Chinese smartphone company Meizu for its Polestar and Lynk & Co brands with its auto OS and AR system. Oppo collaborates with SAIC Motor on the infotainment system used for MG EVs. Xiaomi is the first and the only Chinese tech company that is directly involved in automotive design, development and manufacturing, and operates its factory in Beijing.

Chinese technology industry involvement in the automotive industry
Tech company	Manufacturer	Collaborating brand	Note
Huawei (HIMA)	Seres Group	AITO	Collaborates under the Harmony Intelligent Mobility Alliance (HIMA) model. Huawei provides a complete set of vehicle solutions and participates in product definition, design, marketing, user experience, quality control and delivery, while the manufacturers are responsible for vehicle manufacturing.
Huawei (HIMA)	Chery	Luxeed	Collaborates under the Harmony Intelligent Mobility Alliance (HIMA) model. Huawei provides a complete set of vehicle solutions and participates in product definition, design, marketing, user experience, quality control and delivery, while the manufacturers are responsible for vehicle manufacturing.
Huawei (HIMA)	JAC Group	Maextro	Collaborates under the Harmony Intelligent Mobility Alliance (HIMA) model. Huawei provides a complete set of vehicle solutions and participates in product definition, design, marketing, user experience, quality control and delivery, while the manufacturers are responsible for vehicle manufacturing.
Huawei (HIMA)	BAIC BluePark	Stelato	Collaborates under the Harmony Intelligent Mobility Alliance (HIMA) model. Huawei provides a complete set of vehicle solutions and participates in product definition, design, marketing, user experience, quality control and delivery, while the manufacturers are responsible for vehicle manufacturing.
Huawei (HIMA)	SAIC Motor	SAIC	Collaborates under the Harmony Intelligent Mobility Alliance (HIMA) model. Huawei provides a complete set of vehicle solutions and participates in product definition, design, marketing, user experience, quality control and delivery, while the manufacturers are responsible for vehicle manufacturing.
Xiaomi	Xiaomi Auto		Directly invests and is involved in automotive design, development and manufacturing.
Baidu	Dongfeng	Voyah	Baidu equips Dongfeng's electric vehicle brand, Voyah, with its Apollo autonomous driving system.
Baidu	Geely	Jidu Auto / Ji Yue	Baidu and Geely have established two joint venture companies, Jidu Auto for automotive technology, and Ji Yue for car manufacturing.
DJI	SAIC-GM-Wuling	Baojun	DJI provides its autonomous driving system for several brands, including Baojun, Volkswagen, and iCar.
DJI	SAIC Volkswagen	Volkswagen	DJI provides its autonomous driving system for several brands, including Baojun, Volkswagen, and iCar.
DJI	Chery	iCar	DJI provides its autonomous driving system for several brands, including Baojun, Volkswagen, and iCar.
Qihoo 360	Hozon	Neta	Collaborates in a form of investment.
Meizu	Geely	Lynk & Co, Polestar	Meizu provides an auto OS called Flyme Auto OS, and an AR system.
Oppo	SAIC Motor	MG	Oppo co-develops the infotainment system.

=== Major autonomous driving solution companies ===
- Yinwang (Shenzhen Yinwang Intelligent Technology Co., Ltd, 深圳引望智能技术有限公司) is a company of Huawei which specialized in providing parts and hardware and software solutions for automotive manufacturers. The company was formerly known as Huawei Intelligent Automotive Solution (HIAS, 华为智能汽车解决方案), the automobile business unit of Huawei. The company is deeply involved in China's automotive industry, providing autonomous driving solutions for most manufacturers and brands.
- Momenta (Momenta Global Limited) is a developer of autonomous driving technology based in Beijing and Suzhou. Founded in 2016, it is backed and invested by multiple manufacturers including SAIC, GM, Toyota and Mercedes-Benz.
- Qianli Technology (Chongqing Qianli Technology Co., Ltd 重庆千里科技股份有限公司), formerly known as Lifan Technology (Group) Co., Ltd. (力帆科技（集团）股份有限公司), is a Chinese technology company specializing in the integration of artificial intelligence (AI) and automotive technologies. Headquartered in Chongqing, the companies is mostly owned by Geely and is the major provider of autonomous driving solution for the Geely Group.
- Zhuoyu Technology (Shenzhen Zhuoyu Technology Co., Ltd, 卓驭科技), formerly known as DJI Automotive, is an autonomous driving solution company invested by FAW Group and DJI. The company was originally established as DJI's automotive division in 2016 before being spun off as an independent entity in 2023.
- Horizon Robotics (地平线) is a Chinese technology company headquartered in Beijing. The company develops artificial intelligence (AI) chips used in self-driving cars and advanced driver assistance systems (ADAS). The company is the major autonomous driving solution provider of Li Auto, SAIC, BYD and Chery.
- DeepRoute.ai (元戎启行), is a Chinese autonomous driving company founded in 2019 and headquartered in Shenzhen, China. The company is invested and backed by GWM.

== Statistics ==
Historic sales volume of Chinese brand passenger vehicles
Year	Chinese brand passenger vehicle sales	Domestic share of Chinese brand passenger vehicles	Global passenger vehicle sales	Global share of Chinese brand passenger vehicles
2010	6,273,000	45.6%	58,239,494	10.77%
2011	6,112,200	42.2%	59,897,273	10.20%
2012	6,485,000	41.9%	63,081,024	10.28%
2013	7,222,000	40.3%	65,745,403	10.98%
2014	7,518,000	38.1%	67,782,035	11.09%
2015	8,737,600	41.3%	68,539,516	12.75%
2016	10,529,000	43.2%	72,105,435	14.60%
2017	10,847,000	43.9%	73,456,531	14.77%
2018	9,890,000	42.1%	70,498,388	14.03%
2019	8,470,000	39.2%	64,033,463	13.23%
2020	7,749,000	38.4%	53,915,928	14.37%
2021	9,543,000	44.4%	56,437,803	16.91%
2022	11,766,000	49.9%	57,485,378	20.47%
2023	14,596,000	56%	65,272,367	22.36%
2024	17,970,000	65.2%	67,542,081	26.61%
2025	20,936,000	69.5%	70,974,658	29.49%

Historic production data and notable milestones in the Chinese automobile industry
Year	Production	Global share	Milestones
1955	61		Foundation of the First Automobile Works (FAW)
1960	22,574		
1970	87,166		
1978	149,062		Beginning of the reform and opening up
1985	443,377		
1990	509,242		
1995	1,452,697		
2002	3,250,000	5.6%	Accession to the World Trade Organization (WTO)
2005	5,710,000	8.6%	
2009	13,790,000	25.0%	Surpassed the United States as the world's largest automobile producer
2010	18,260,000	24.2%	Largest number of cars produced by any nation
2015	24,500,000	27.43%	Became the world's largest EV producer
2017	29,020,000	30.19%	
2022	27,021,000	31.8%	Surpassed Germany as the world's second largest car exporter
2023	30,161,000	32.4%	Surpassed Japan as the world's largest car exporter
2024	31,436,000	33.0%	
2025	34,531,000	35.8%	Chinese brands vehicles surpass Japanese brands globally in volume

Automotive industry production capacity of China by province
Region	Production share	Provincial	Production volume in 2023	Capacity utilization	Chinese brands	Foreign brands
Yangtze Delta	28.1%	Anhui	2,250,743	67.0%	Chery, BYD, Changan, Sehol, JAC, Jetour	Land Rover, Jaguar
Yangtze Delta	28.1%	Jiangsu	1,837,252	39.3%	Li Auto, BYD, Ora, Roewe, MG, Maxus, Deepal, HiPhi	Volkswagen, Kia, Mazda
Yangtze Delta	28.1%	Shanghai	1,810,679	69.6%	IM, Roewe, Rising, BYD	Cadillac, Audi, Tesla, Buick, Mercedes-Benz
Yangtze Delta	28.1%	Zhejiang	1,368,005	29.7%	Geely, Zeekr, Geely Galaxy, Lynk & Co, Polestar, Aion, Neta, Leapmotor, BYD	Volkswagen, Volvo, Ford
Central	14.8%	Hubei	1,585,294	41.4%	Voyah, M-Hero, Aeolus, Trumpchi, Tank	Honda, Nissan, Infiniti, Buick, Chevrolet, Dacia
Central	14.8%	Hunan	1,009,720	42.1%	BYD, Denza, Geely, Beijing	Volkswagen
Central	14.8%	Henan	811,836	37.4%	MG, Jetour, Roewe, BYD, Fangchengbao	Venucia
Central	14.8%	Jiangxi	431,244	26.3%	BYD, Trumpchi, JMC	Ford
Chuan-Yu	9.6%	Chongqing	1,698,586	34.9%	Changan, Avatr, Deepal, Oshan, Tank, Jinbei, AITO, Seres, Landian, Livan, Wuling, Baojun	Ford, Lincoln
Chuan-Yu	9.6%	Sichuan	782,924	43.3%	Zeekr, Lynk & Co, Kaiyi	Volvo, Toyota, Volkswagen, Jetta
Pearl River Delta	13.2%	Guangdong	3,418,749	65.5%	Trumpchi, Aion, BYD, XPeng, Beijing	Toyota, Honda, Nissan, Audi, Volkswagen
Jing-Jin-Ji	9.8%	Tianjin	1,075,244	71.1%	Haval	Volkswagen, Audi, Toyota
Jing-Jin-Ji	9.8%	Beijing	912,003	45.6%	Changan, Beijing, Xiaomi, Li Auto	Mercedes-Benz, Hyundai
Jing-Jin-Ji	9.8%	Hebei	542,214	35.0%	Haval, Wey, Lynk & Co	Hyundai
Northeast	10.5%	Jilin	1,450,020	65.0%	Hongqi, Bestune	Volkswagen, Audi, Toyota
Northeast	10.5%	Liaoning	1,197,285	64.9%	Chery	BMW, Nissan, Infiniti, Buick
Northeast	10.5%	Heilongjiang	83,876	52.4%		Volvo, Ford
Other	14.0%	Shaanxi	1,255,307	85.1	BYD, Yangwang, Denza, Smart	
Other	14.0%	Guangxi	882,892	36.8%	Guangxi Auto, Forthing	Chevrolet
Other	14.0%	Shandong	849,469	36.5%	BYD, Wuling	Volkswagen, Audi, Cadillac, Buick, Chevrolet
Other	14.0%	Fujian	287,021	44.5%	MG	Mercedes-Benz
Other	14.0%	Shanxi	164,188	54.7%	Geely Geometry	
Other	14.0%	Inner Mongolia	89,775	89.8%	Chery	
Other	14.0%	Guizhou	51,529	16.6%	Geely	
Other	14.0%	Xinjiang	40,789	40.8%	Trumpchi	Volkswagen
Other	14.0%	Hainan	12,871	2.9%	Haima	
Other	14.0%	Yunnan	3,387	3.4%	JMEV	

== Etymology of major manufacturers ==
Trade name in English	Common name in Chinese	Literal meaning in Chinese	Note
Central State-owned manufacturers
FAW	一汽	abbreviation for First Automotive Works	First automotive manufacturer of the People's Republic of China
Dongfeng	东风	'the East Wind'	Taken from Mao Zedong's famous saying "The east wind shalll prevail over the west wind", which means that the power of socialism will surely defeat the power of capitalism.
Changan	长安	'Long-lasting peace'	Originated from "Chongqing Changan Arsenal", the predecessor entity in defense industry in 1950s. Changan is also the ancient name for the capital of Tang Dynasty.
Local State-owned manufacturers
SAIC	上汽	abbreviation for Shanghai Automotive Industry Corporation	Location of the manufacturer
GAC	广汽	abbreviation for Guangzhou Automobile Group	Location of the manufacturer
BAIC	北汽	abbreviation for Beijing Automotive Industry Corporation	Location of the manufacturer
JAC	江淮	abbreviation for Anhui Jianghuai Automobile Group Corp	Location of the manufacturer. Jianghuai refers to the northern Jiangsu and northern and central Anhui, where JAC located.
State-private mixed ownership manufacturer
Seres	赛力斯	'China'	Derived from the Ancient Greek word Σῆρες, which means 'China'
Chery	奇瑞	'unexpected and auspicious'	Named by Yin Tongyue, the company's first technical director
Privately owned manufacturers
Geely	吉利	'auspicious, propitious'	Phonetic transliteration of the company's native name 吉利
BYD	比亚迪	abbreviation for Build Your Dream	Originated from Yadi Electronics, the company's initial name, the character bi (比) was added to the name to prevent duplication, and to provide the company with an alphabetical advantage in trade shows. The backronymic slogan "Build Your Dreams" was adopted starting in 2008.
GWM	长城	'the Great Wall'	Name by Wei Jianjun, the company's founder
Li Auto	理想	'ideal'	Homophone of its founder, Li Xiang.
XPeng	小鹏	'Little Peng' (a gigantic bird in Chinese myth)	Derived from the given name of the founder He Xiaopeng
Nio	蔚来	'Future' (homophone)	"N" stands for new era, "I" for innovation, and "O" for openness
Leapmotor	零跑	'Leading the race' (homophone)	零 in Chinese means 'zero', which represents the vision of zero emissions, zero accidents, and zero traffic jams.

== Former manufacturers and brands ==
=== Bankruptcy ===
==== State-owned manufacturers ====
- Bamin (1980's–2010)
- Disai (1989–1996)
- Guizhou Yunque (1989–2005)
- Shuanghuan Auto (1988–2016)
- Shenyang Heibao (2001–2005)

==== Privately owned manufacturers ====
- LVCHI (2016–2022)
- Anda'er (1991–2016)
- BAIC Yinxiang (1997–2019, reconstructed into Ruixiang)
  - Weiwang (2011–2019)
  - Bisu (2016–2019)
  - Huansu (2014–2019)
- Baolong (1998–2005)
- Binzhou Pride (2006–2008)
- Bordrin (2016–2021)
- Byton (2016–2021)
- Docan (2023, formally Niutron and Dorcen)
- Enovate (2015–2023, formally DearCC)
- Fuqi (1969–2013)
- Fuxing (1994–1998)
- Green Field Motor (2010–2016)
- Greentech Automotive (2009–2018)
- Hawtai (Huatai) (2000–2023)
- Hanteng Autos (2013–2022)
- Hengchi (2020–2023)
- Hycan (2018–2025)
- Jonway (2003–2016)
- Levdeo (2008–2023)
  - Yema Auto (1994–2019, acquired by Levdeo)
- National Electric Vehicle Experimental & Demonstration Area (NEVEDA) (1995–2004)
- CH-Auto (2007–2025)
  - Qiantu Motor (2015–2025)
- Pocco (2021–2022)
- Sanxing (1990–2002)
- Shanlu Motors (1991–2001)
- Suda (2010–2023)
- Sinogold (2017–2024, as privately owned manufacturer before acquired by municipal government of Zibo in 2022)
- Iconiq Motors (2017–2021)
- Tianju Automobile (1987–2011)
- Yemingzhu (1988–2011)
- Tongtian (2002–2005)
- Tengzhong (2005–2014)
- Ycaco (1987–1993; Joint-venture with the Jiangxi Automobile Manufacturing Plant producing Isuzu trucks)
- Polarsun Automobile (2003–2018, acquired by Weltmeister)
- Dalian Huanghai (2009–2017, acquired by Weltmeister)
- Youxia Motors (2014–2022)
- Youngman (2001–2015)
- Zhidian Automobile (2018–2021)
- Chun Nan Jun (1958–2024)
- Hozon Auto (2014–2025)
  - Neta (2014–2025)

=== Acquisition or defunct subsidiary ===
- Brilliance Auto Group (1992–2020, reconstructed in to Shenyang Auto in 2024)
- Datong (1954–2000s, acquired by FAW)
- Yungang (1989–2000's, acquired by FAW)
- Oley (2012–2015, subsidiary of FAW)
- Huali (1984–2002, subsidiary of FAW)
- FAW Jilin (1980–2019, subsidiary of FAW, acquired by Shandong Baoya Group)
- FAW Tianjin (Junpai) (1965–2019, a subsidiary of FAW)
  - Xiali (1997–2015, subsidiary of FAW Tianjin)
- Dongfeng Yulon (2010–2020, joint venture of Dongfeng with Yulon)
- Oshan (2010–2024, subsidiary of Changan Automobile, merged into Changan brand)
- Hafei (1950–2015, subsidiary Changan)
- Rising Auto (2020–2025, subsidiary of SAIC Group, rolled back into Roewe)
- Nanjing Yuejin Soyat (1999–2007, subsidiary of Nanjing Automobile Corporation, merged into SAIC)
- Changfeng Motor (1950–1996, acquired by GAC Group)
- Gonow (2003–2016, acquired by GAC Group)
  - Hanjiang (car manufacturer under Tonghui Machinery Works until 2005; acquired by Gonow)
- Yangchang Motors (1958–1993, acquired by GAC Group in 2009)
- Changhe (1970–2022, a subsidiary of BAIC)
- Borgward Group (2014–2022, acquired by Foton and discontinued in 2022)
- Riich (2009–2013, subsidiary of Chery)
- Sehol (2018–2024, 2018–2020 as a joint venture with VW, 2020–2024 as a subsidiary of JAC; rolled back into JAC)
- Nushen (1990–2001, currently a subsidiary of JAC)
- Fuzhou Automobile Works (1956–1984)
  - Fuzhou Automotive Industry Corporation (1984–1990, became Fujian Motors Group)
- Heibao Auto (1990–2020, acquired by Sinotruk Group)
- Dadi Auto (1988–2012, acquired by CHTC)
- Liming (1986–2001)
- Qinchuan (1987–2002, acquired by BYD Company, became BYD Auto)
- Lifan Technology (1992–2021, acquired by Geely and consolidated into Livan)
  - Huayang (1990's–2004, acquired by Lifan Group)
  - Projen (2015–2021)
- Jidu Auto / Ji Yue (2023–2025, subsidiary of Geely)
- Geely Geometry (2019–2024, subsidiary of Geely, merged into Geely Galaxy)
- Emgrand (2009–2014, subsidiary of Geely, rolled back into Geely Auto)
- Gleagle (2008–2014, subsidiary of Geely, rolled back into Geely Auto)
- Englon (2010–2013, subsidiary of Geely, rebranded as LEVC)
- Zhidou (2014–2020, subsidiary of Geely)
- Sar (2021–2023, merged into Ora)
- Foday (1988–2020, acquired by Xpeng)
- Fujian New Forta (2001–2020, acquired by Leapmotor)
  - Forta (1990–2001) (became New Forta)
- Traum (2017–2021, subsidiary of Zotye)
- Domy Auto (2015–2021, subsidiary of Zotye)
- Huasong Auto (2014–2020, subsidiary of Brilliance Auto)
- Human Horizons (2017–2024, acquired by EV Electra in 2025)
- Landwind (2004–2022, marque of Jiangling Motor Holding)
- Zedriv (2017–2022, owned by Sinomach)
- Xinkai (1984–2020, acquired by Jemmell New Energy Automotive)
- Qoros (2007–2026, acquired by Baoneng from Chery in 2017)

=== Defunct foreign manufacturers ===
- Ford Beyond (2022–2026, JMC Ford Technology, Ford held 65.32% majority of stake indirectly)
- Zinoro (2013–2020, subsidiary of BWM China)

=== Current and defunct joint venture manufacturer in Mainland China ===
This list includes major car company joint ventures ever existed in mainland China (truck and coach JVs not included). Early 1980s-90s CKD assembly agreements are not included as the production numbers are typically negligible compared to later joint venture efforts. Technology transfer agreements to domestic brands are also not included.

- Toyota
  - FAW Toyota (2000–present, with FAW) (consolidated from Tianjin and Sichuan JV)
    - (Defunct) FAW (Jilin) Daihatsu (2005–2010, with FAW)
  - GAC Toyota (2004–present, with GAC)
    - (Defunct) GAC Hino (2007–2025, acquired by GAC Group and renamed to GAC Lingcheng)
    - (Defunct) Leahead (2015–2017)
- Volkswagen
  - FAW-VW (with FAW)
    - Jetta
  - SAIC-VW (with SAIC)
    - AUDI (2024–present)
    - (Defunct) Škoda (2006–2026)
  - (Acquired) JAC-VW (2017–2020, with JAC, became Volkswagen Anhui after a majority 78.52% stake was acquired in 2020)
- Honda
  - Dongfeng Honda (with Dongfeng)
    - (Defunct) Ciimo (2012–2024)
    - Lingxi (2023–present)
  - GAC Honda (1998–present, with GAC)
    - (Defunct) GAC Acura (2016–2022)
    - (Defunct) Everus (2008–2015)
- General Motors
  - SAIC-GM (with SAIC)
  - SAIC-GM-Wuling (with Wuling, SAIC)
  - (Defunct) FAW-GM (2009–2019, with FAW)
  - (Defunct) Jinbei GM (1995–2000, with Brilliance Auto Group, sold to SAIC)
- Ford
  - Changan Ford (2012–present, with Changan)
  - Jiangling Motors (JMC) (1993–present, indirectly with Changan and JMCG)
  - Changan Ford New Energy (2023–present, with Changan)
- Stellantis
  - Dongfeng Peugeot-Citroën (1992–present, with Dongfeng)
  - Dongfeng Stellantis Automotive Technology (2026–present, with Dongfeng)
  - Leapmotor International (2023–present, with Leapmotor)
  - (Defunct) GAC FCA (2010–2022, with GAC)
  - (Defunct) Changan PSA (2011–2020, with Changan, sold to Baoneng)
  - (Defunct) Guangzhou Peugeot (1985–1997, with GAC, stakes taken by Honda)
  - (Defunct) Nanjing Fiat (1999–2006, with Nanjing Auto, merged to SAIC)
  - (Defunct) Beijing Jeep (1987–2005, taken by Mercedes-Benz)
- Iveco
  - (Defunct) Changzhou Iveco (2001–2007, with Changzhou Changjiang Bus)
- Renault
  - JMEV (2015–present, with JMCG by 50:37)
  - eGT New Energy Automotive (2017–present, Renault/Nissan with Dongfeng)
  - (Defunct) Renault Brilliance Jinbei (2017–2021, with Brilliance Auto Group)
  - (Defunct) Sanjiang Renault (1993–2003, with CASIC)
  - (Defunct) Dongfeng Renault (2013–2020, with Dongfeng)
- Nissan
  - Dongfeng Nissan (with Dongfeng)
    - Dongfeng Infiniti (2014–present)
    - Venucia (2010–present, brand of Dongfeng-Nissan)
  - Zhengzhou Nissan (with Dongfeng)
    - Dongfeng Fengdu (2013–present, brand of Zhengzhou Nissan)
- Mercedes-Benz
  - Beijing Benz (with BAIC)
  - Fujian Benz (with BAIC, Fujian Motors)
- BMW
  - Spotlight Automotive (Mini) (2018–present, with Great Wall Motor)
- Hyundai-Kia
  - Jiangsu Yueda Kia Motors (with Dongfeng and Yueda, Dongfeng sold its stake to Yueda in 2022)
    - (Defunct) Horki (2013–2019)
  - Beijing Hyundai (with BAIC)
- Isuzu
  - Jiangxi Isuzu (1983–present, with Jiangling)
  - Qingling Motors (1985–present, with Qingling)
- Tata
  - Chery Jaguar Land Rover (with Chery)
    - Freelander (2024–present)
- Mazda
  - Changan Mazda (with Changan)
  - (Defunct) Hainan Mazda (1992–2006, with Haima)
  - (Defunct) FAW Car-Mazda (2005–2021, with FAW, assets sold to Changan)
- Mitsubishi
  - (Defunct) GAC Mitsubishi (2012–2023, with GAC)
  - (Defunct) Soueast (2013–2020, Mitsubishi, in conjunction with Taiwan's CMC. Foreign maker quit JV)
- Suzuki
  - (Defunct) Changan Suzuki (1993–2018, with Changan)

== See also ==
- Automotive industry in China
- Automotive industry in Taiwan
- List of foreign brand vehicles made by automobile manufacturers of China
- List of automobile manufacturers
- List of Asian automobile manufacturers
  - List of Taiwanese automakers
- List of automobile marques
