= Mudan =

Mudan (牡丹) may refer to:

- Paeonia rockii, or Rock's peony, woody species of peony, known as 紫斑牡丹 in Chinese.
- Paeonia suffruticosa, or tree peony, known as 牡丹 in Chinese.

== People's Republic of China ==
- Mudan District, Heze, Shandong
- Mudan River, in Heilongjiang

== Republic of China (Taiwan) ==
- Mudan, Pingtung, township in Pingtung, Taiwan
- Mudan Station, railway station of the Taiwan Railway Administration (TRA) Yilan Line, located in New Taipei

== See also ==
- Mudan Auto, a Chinese bus manufacturer
