= BYD e7 =

Battery electric mid-size sedan

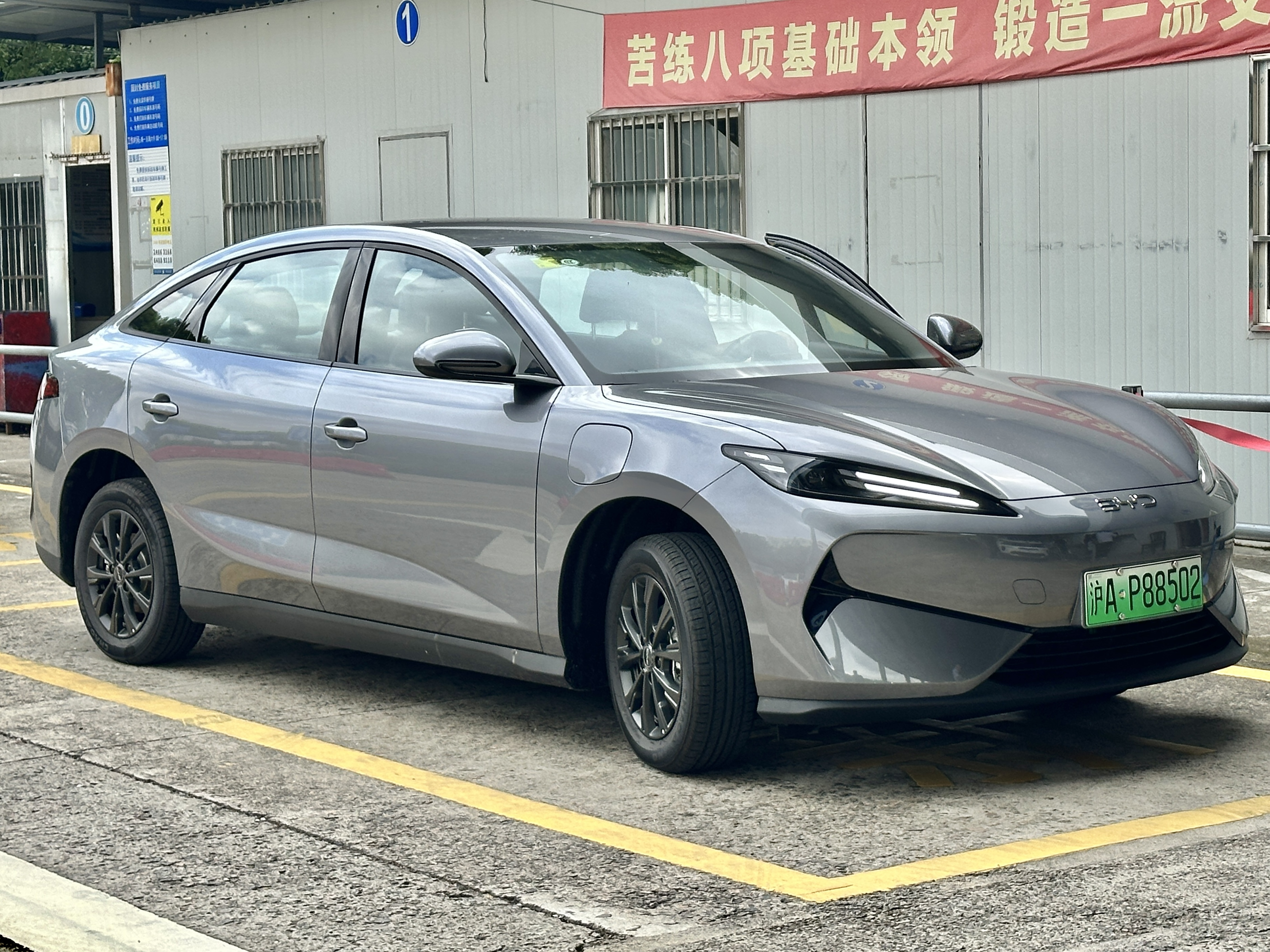

Overview
- Manufacturer: BYD Auto
- Also called: Linghui e7 (2026–present)
- Production: May 2025 – present
- Assembly: China
- Designer: Under the lead of Wolfgang Egger

Body and chassis
- Class: Mid-size car (D-segment)
- Body style: 4-door sedan
- Layout: Front motor, front-wheel drive
- Related: BYD Qin L EV; BYD Seal 06 EV

Powertrain
- Electric motor: 100 kW TZ180XSJ
- Power output: 134 hp (100 kW; 136 PS)
- Battery: 48 kWh LFP BYD Blade; 57.6 kWh LFP BYD Blade
- Electric range: 450–520 km (280–323 mi) (CLTC)
- Plug-in charging: DC: 70–84 kW

Dimensions
- Wheelbase: 2,820 mm (111.0 in)
- Length: 4,780 mm (188.2 in)
- Width: 1,900 mm (74.8 in)
- Height: 1,515 mm (59.6 in)
- Curb weight: 1,499–1,566 kg (3,305–3,452 lb)

The BYD e7 is a battery electric mid-size sedan manufactured by BYD Auto since 2025. It was officially unveiled on 9 April 2025. On 17 May 2025, it was officially released with a starting price of ¥103,800 RMB.

== Overview ==
The e7 is part of BYD's e-series, previously exclusive to ride-hailing services. Now, it has been grouped into BYD's ocean series, being sold as a lower-cost option instead.

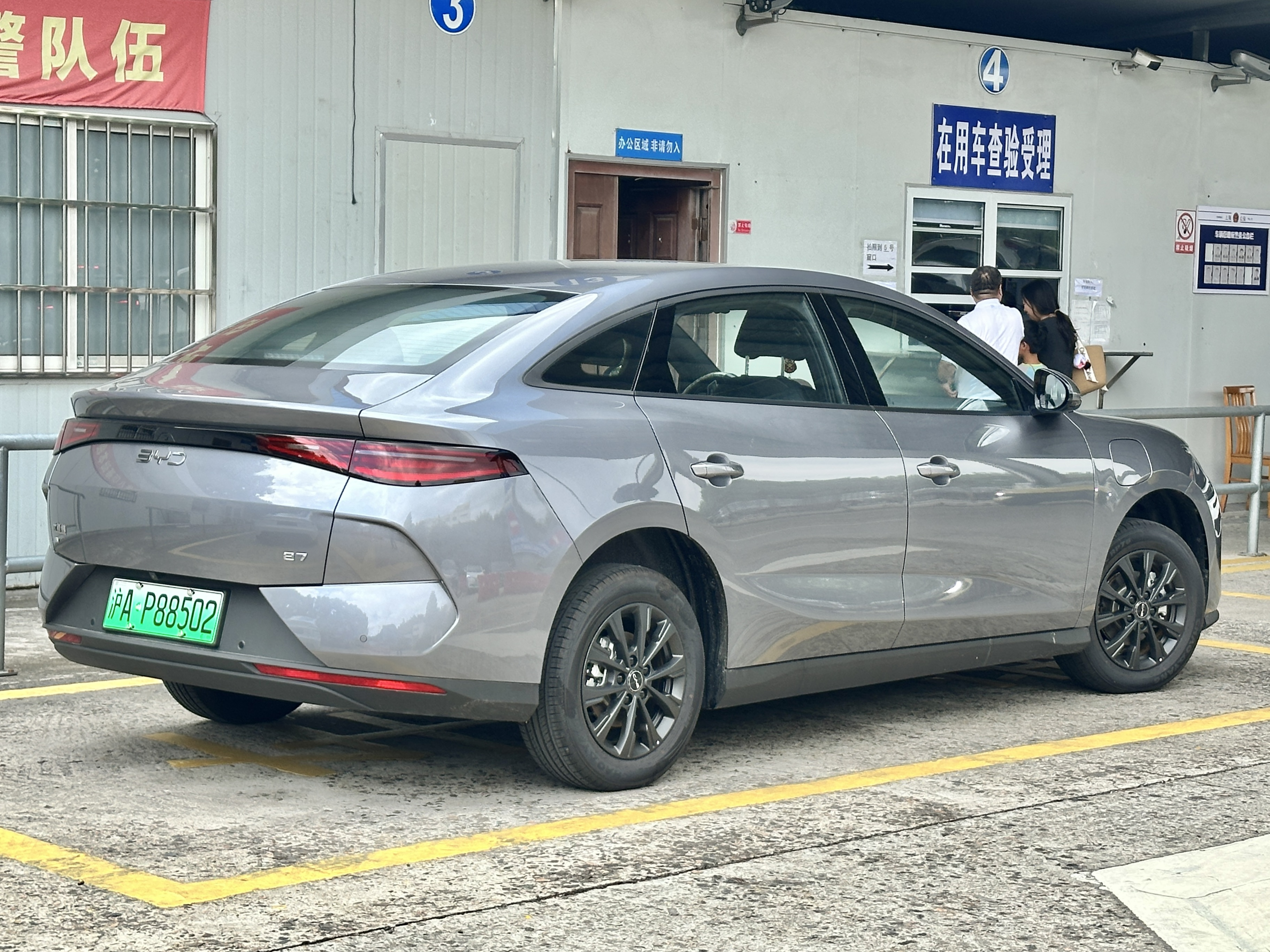
Rear view

== Design ==
=== Exterior ===
The e7 adopts the ocean series Marine Aesthetics design language, but with certain features altered to reflect the lower cost. This includes traditional door handles like one in the BYD Atto 3, two separate taillight units instead of a light bar, and 16-inch wheels.

=== Interior ===
The interior features a flat-bottom steering wheel borrowed from BYD Destroyer 05 or other e-Series models, a column-mounted gear shifter, a 15.6-inch central display similar to updated global-market BYD Atto 3, and a 5-inch LCD instrument panel. The second row features ISOFIX anchor points, air vents, LED reading lights and USB charging ports. The trunk has a volume of 528 L.

== Specifications ==
It uses BYD's TZ180XSJ electric motor that produces 100 kW (134 hp) and up to 180 N⋅m (133 lb⋅ft) of torque powering the front wheels. Two BYD Blade lithium iron phosphate (LFP) batteries with a capacity of 48 kWh and 57.6 kWh are available, corresponding to a CLTC range of 450 and 520 km (280 and 323 mi), respectively. Both versions have a top speed of 150 km/h (93 mph).

== Linghui e7 ==
Images of a Linghui e7 was revealed by the MIIT on January 9, 2026, it is a ride-hailing variant of a BYD e7, which is part of a Ocean Series. The new Linghui brand continued to be focused on ride-hailing services.

== See also ==
- List of BYD Auto vehicles
