= Linghui =

Chinese electric car brand by BYD Auto

- Type: Division
- Industry: Automotive
- Founded: 2026; 0 years ago
- Area served: China
- Products: Automobiles
- Owner: BYD Auto

Chinese name
- Simplified Chinese: 领汇
- Traditional Chinese: 領匯
Transcriptions
Standard Mandarin
- Hanyu Pinyin: Lǐng huì
- Website: linghuiauto.com

Linghui Auto (Chinese: 领汇汽车) is a Chinese electric car brand owned by BYD Auto. Introduced in early 2026, it is BYD Auto's fifth brand after the namesake BYD marque, Denza, Fangchengbao, and Yangwang. The brand was established to focus on the taxi and ride-hailing markets, a strategic effort to distance the mainstream BYD marque from its traditional association with commercial fleets.

== History ==
Linghui vehicles appeared in the Ministry of Industry and Information Technology's vehicle declarations in January 2026, prior to its announcement on 2 February 2026. The brand was created to separate commercial fleet operations from the consumer market, distancing the main BYD marque from the ride-hailing image to support its retail positioning. As BYD's fifth brand, Linghui operates with an independent logo and sales channel.

Linghui's initial product lineup, consisting of three battery electric sedans and one plug-in hybrid minivan, are rebadged from BYD models to reduce research and production costs. The vehicles are modified for fleet use with wear-resistant seating and warranties of up to six years or 600,000 kilometers.

== Products ==
- Linghui e5, rebadged BYD Qin Plus EV
- Linghui e7, new name for model initially introduced as BYD e7
- Linghui e9, new name for model initially introduced as BYD e9
- Linghui M9, rebadged BYD Xia

== See also ==
- BYD Auto
- List of BYD Auto vehicles
- Denza
- Yangwang
- Fangchengbao
- Automobile manufacturers and brands of China
- List of automobile manufacturers of China
