= Youxia Motors =

Chinese automobile manufacturer

- Type: Private
- Industry: Automotive
- Founded: April 2014; 12 years ago
- Founder: Will Lee
- Defunct: 2019; 7 years ago
- Fate: bankrupt
- Headquarters: Shanghai, China
- Website: www.youxiamotors.com/english.php

Youxia Motors (Chinese: 游侠汽车) was a Chinese automobile manufacturer fomerly headquartered in Shanghai, China, that specializes in producing neighborhood electric vehicles, low-speed electric vehicles, and sport electric vehicles.

== History ==
Youxia Motors was founded in 2014, with a registered capital of 4.2 billion yuan. In October 2017, Youxia launched their factory construction, a completed their automated production line design.

The Youxia X, also called the Youxia Ranger, is their first production vehicle. It has RWD, a 40 kWh battery, and can go 2.8 seconds to go 0–60 km. It includes a programmable face displayer as well as driver set features. The X includes Youxia OS, a smart-technology system that can control air conditioning, lights, voice recognition and commands, as well as talk back to the driver. The car has a 70% accident avoidance. It will have up to Level 3 self-driving capabilities. It was designed by 50 engineers in 500 days. It will cost $30,000 and $45,000.

However, due to problems with its capital chain and production qualifications, Youxia Motors ultimately failed to achieve mass production. In 2019, Youxia Automobile's Huzhou factory stopped production, the project construction command center evacuated, and the company faced serious financial difficulties. In 2020, the Wuxing District Government of Huzhou City announced the acquisition of the land and ongoing projects of the Youxia Automobile Industrial Project, marking the substantial end of Youxia Automobile's car manufacturing project.

== Vehicles ==
=== Models ===
Youxia currently has 1 production vehicle.

Model	Photo	Specifications
Youxia X/Ranger		Body style: Sedan Class: S-segment Doors: 4 Seats: 5 Battery: 40 kWh Production: 2016 Revealed: 2015 Beijing Auto Show

=== Concept Models ===
Model	Photo	Specifications
Youxia One		Body style: Coupe Class: S-segment Doors: 2 Seats: 4 Battery: 40 kWh Revealed: 2015

== See also ==
- Tesla
- Tesla Model S
- WindBooster
- Thunder Power
