= Horki (brand) =

Chinese electric car brand

- Founded: 2013
- Founder: Feng Li
- Defunct: 2019
- Headquarters: Yancheng, China
- Key people: Feng Li (President)
- Owner: Dongfeng Yueda Kia

Horki is a former Chinese manufacturer of electric passenger cars based in Yancheng, operating in the years 2013–2019. It belonged to a Sino-South Korean joint venture between Dongfeng Motor and Kia Motors.

== History ==
In April 2013, during the Shanghai Auto Show, the Chinese joint venture Dongfeng Yueda Kia announced the introduction of a new Horki brand of electric cars for sale in the domestic market, whose name comes from a modified Chinese word Huaqi meaning Chinese horse.

The first vehicle announcing its introduction to the market was the Horki Concept prototype, which was based on the compact sedan model based on the Forte model.

The first and only production car of the Horki brand was the Horki 300E model, presented in mid-2016, which was created as a twin, electric-powered version of the combustion engine Kia Cerato R. The car was sold in China for the next 3 years, and then due to its low popularity it was withdrawn and the Horki brand disappeared from the market.

== Products ==
- 300E (2016–2019)
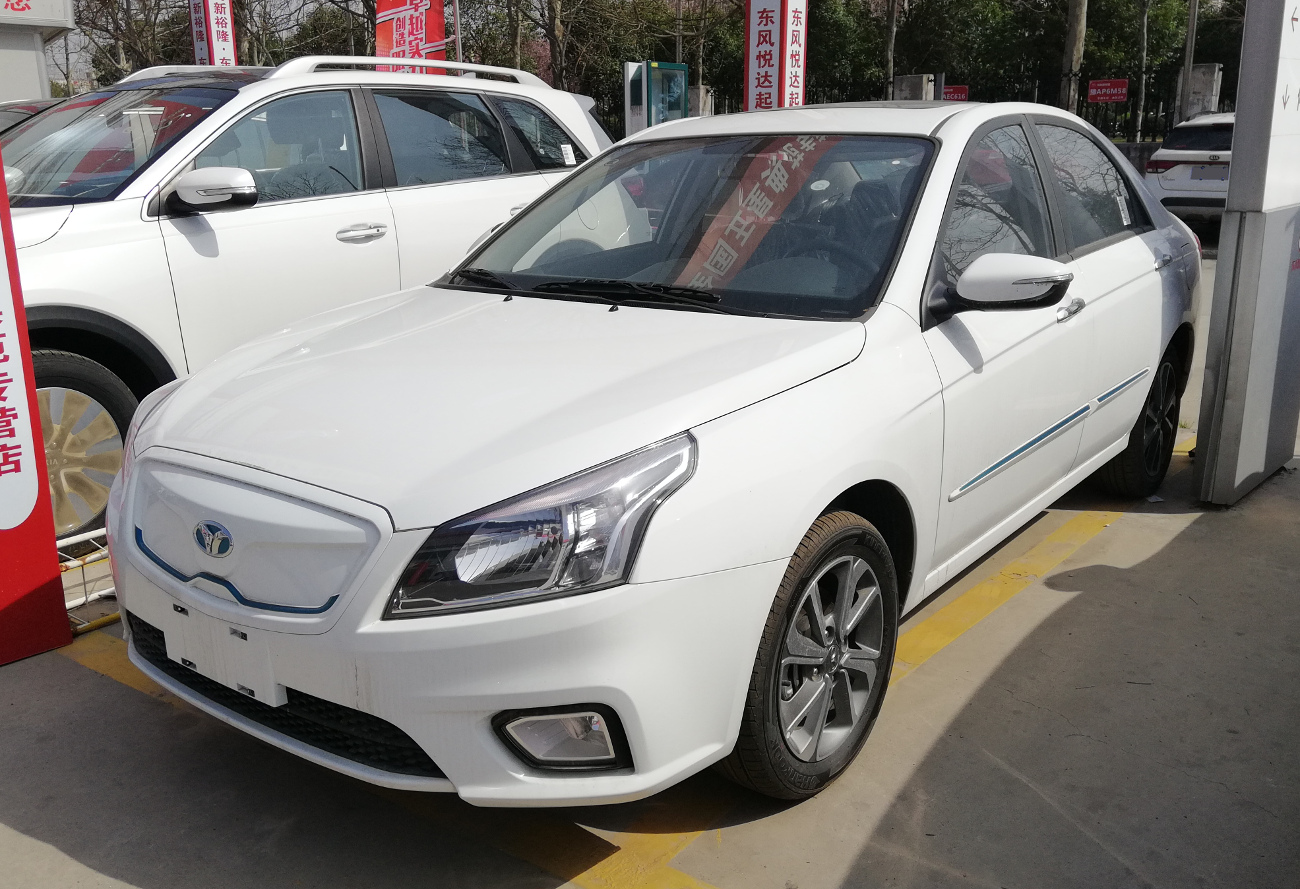
Horki 300E
