= GAC Commercial Vehicle =

Chinese electric vehicle manufacturer

GAC New Energy Commercial Vehicle Co., Ltd
- Native name: 广汽领程新能源商用车有限公司
- Type: Subsidiary
- Traded as: GAC Commercial Vehicle
- Industry: Automotive
- Predecessor: GAC Hino
- Founded: May 2025; 1 year ago
- Headquarters: Guangzhou, China
- Area served: China
- Key people: Gao Rui (Chairman); Zhang Zhiyong (General Manager)
- Products: Trucks
- Owners: GAC Group (89.72%); Guangzhou Hydrogen Cloud New Energy (5.45%); Hino Motors (4.83%)

Chinese name
- Simplified Chinese: 广汽领程新能源商用车有限公司
- Traditional Chinese: 廣汽領程新能源商用車有限公司
Transcriptions
Standard Mandarin
- Hanyu Pinyin: Guǎngqì Lǐngchéng Xīnnéngyuán Shāngyòngchē Yǒuxiàn Gōngsī

GAC Commercial Vehicle
- Simplified Chinese: 广汽领程
- Traditional Chinese: 廣汽領程
Transcriptions
Standard Mandarin
- Hanyu Pinyin: Guǎngqì Lǐngchéng
- Website: www.gaccv.com/en/

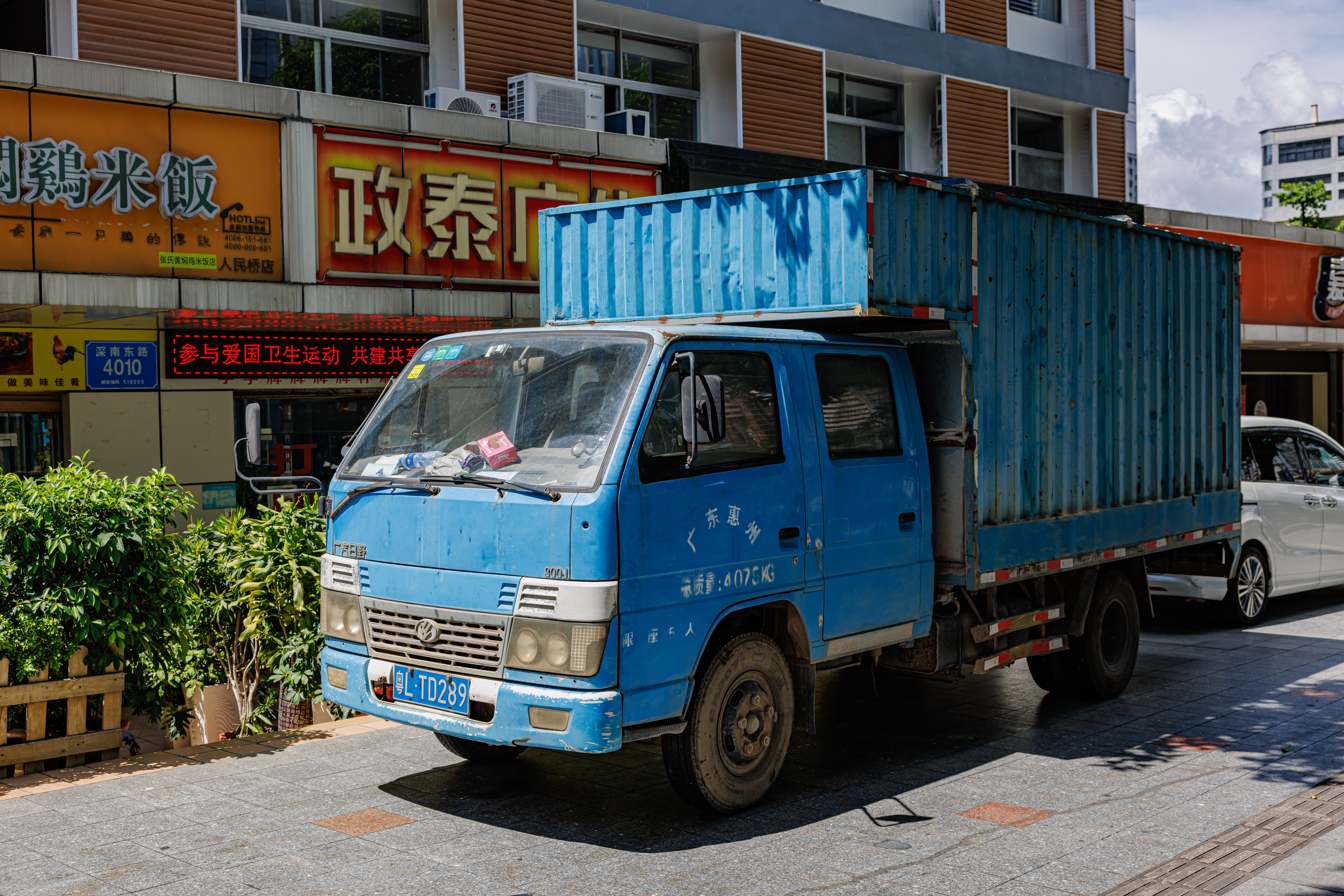
GAC HINO 300J

GAC New Energy Commercial Vehicle Co., Ltd. (Chinese: 广汽领程新能源商用车有限公司; lit. 'GAC Lingcheng New Energy Commercial Vehicle Co. Ltd'), trade as GAC Commercial Vehicle or GAC Lingcheng (Chinese: 广汽领程), is a subsidiary of GAC Group, targeted at manufacturing commercial electric vehicles headquartered in Guangzhou, China. It used to be a joint venture between Hino and GAC for producing Hino brand trucks and was acquired by GAC Group in 2024.

== History ==
=== Hino's early involvement in China ===
In 1978, Hino established a partnership with the Chinese car manufacturer FAW by providing technical assistance on medium trucks to it, mostly for improving FAW's Soviet era Jiefanghao range. The first direct involvement in China from Hino was in 2003, when they set up an engine plant in Shanghai.

=== Shenfei Hino ===
In 1980, the state-owned enterprise Shenfei Group established a bus manufacturing company at Shenyang named as Shenyang Shenfei Automotive (organised as a limited company in December 1993). In December 2002, Shenfei, Hino, and Toyota Tsusho agreed to re-incorporate the company as a joint venture, Shenyang Shenfei Hino Automotive Manufacturing Co., Ltd. (Shenfei Hino), focused on producing Hino buses. At the end of 2003, the joint venture completed a new bus assembly facility.

=== Yangcheng Auto ===
In 1958, the Guangzhou municipal government established the Guangzhou Yangcheng Automotive Plant, later renamed as Yangcheng Auto Company as it became a joint venture between the GAC Group and Hong Kong Zhonglong Investment Company. It built Isuzu-based light trucks and other commercial vehicles.

=== Creation of GAC Hino ===
Both Yangcheng Auto and Shenfei Hino had low sales. In December 2007, GAC and Hino formed the GAC Hino joint venture (an equally-owned venture) by absorbing and reorganising Yangcheng and Shenfei Hino. Both bases (Shenyang and Guangzhou) were kept by GAC Hino until a new facility for producing trucks (the Conghua plant) were completed in Guangzhou. GAC Hino also kept on managing the Yangcheng lineup. In 2008, GAC announced it planned to put Yangcheng production under the GAC marque.

In mid-2009, after some GAC problems, the new Guangzhou plant started operations, producing variants of the Hino 700. That same year, the company also relaunched bus production at Shenyang. In 2016, the Shenyang operations stopped assembly and were dissolved, following constant yearly losses.

In the period between 2009 and 2011, GAC Hino products were only available in Guangdong and the company could keep a production volume of over 1,000 vehicles because the 700 truck was designated for building infrastructure of the 2009 East Asian Games.

On January 24, 2024, GAC Group and Guangzhou Hydrogen Cloud New Energy Technology Investment acquired 39.72% and 5.45% equity stakes in GAC Hino held by Hino Motors for CNY 29.69 million and CNY 4.0739 million, respectively. After the equity adjustment, GAC Group, Hino Motors, and Hydrogen Cloud New Energy hold 89.72%, 4.83%, and 5.45% of the shares, respectively.

=== Re-incorporation as GAC Commercial Vehicle ===
In May 2025, GAC Group announced the restructuring of GAC Hino's operations into GAC New Energy Commercial Vehicle Co., Ltd., as GAC Hino ceased to operate.

== Products and facilities ==
The Guangzhou's Conghua plant is the only production base of the company and has two assembly lines for heavy trucks with a maximum capacity of 20,000 units per year. It produces approximately 5,000 units per year on average. The plant uses the same multi-skilled work system as the Hino's Hamura plant in Japan.

As of 2021, the plant produced the Hino 700 on different configurations.
