= WindBooster =

Chinese automobile manufacturer

- Company type: Private
- Traded as: WindBooster Car Cooperation
- Industry: Automotive
- Founded: 2014; 12 years ago
- Headquarters: Shenzhen
- Website: www.windbooster.com

WindBooster (Chinese: 风翔), full name Windbooster Car Cooperation, is a Chinese automobile aftermarket parts manufacturer headquartered in Shenzhen that specializes in producing and supplying parts for electric vehicles.

== History ==
WindBooster was founded in 2014, and is based in Shenzhen, China. It was founded by the Chinese auto parts company Cammus (卡妙思). WindBooster also makes performance auto parts, such as throttle position sensors and throttle controllers. Their main parts product is the Windbooster Throttle Controller. It gives up to 10 acceleration modes, mode fine-tuning, up to 40 acceleration programs (manual & auto), up to 15% fuel saving, and a lock mode. It advertises ultra compact size (6 mm), specific plugs for each specific car model (safer and more reliable), and it takes less than 5 minutes install.

The WindBooster E86, also called the E68, is the company's first concept vehicle. It has 200 horsepower, can reach 60 miles per hour in 5.9 seconds, and has a top speed of 81 mph. It is based on the Toyota 86.

The Titan concept car has 536 horsepower, can go 0–60 in 3.9 seconds, a top speed of 163 mph, and is powered by a 72 kWh battery. It was shown at the Shenzhen exhibition. The dimensions are 4500 mm/1950 mm/1200 mm, with a wheelbase of 2650 mm. It takes 1.5 hours to charge, and 7 hours with an onboard charger.

== Vehicles ==
=== Concept models ===
WindBooster currently has 2 concept prototype vehicles.

Model	Photo	Specifications
WindBooster Titan		Body style: Sports car Class: S-segment Doors: 2 Seats: 2 Battery: 72 kWh Revealed: 2017
WindBooster E86		Body style: Sports car Class: S-segment Doors: 2 Seats: 2 Battery: 149 kW Revealed: 2014

== See also ==
- Cammus
