= Changzhou Changjiang Bus =

Chinese bus manufacturer

- Founded: 2001
- Defunct: 2007
- Headquarters: Changzhou, Jiangsu, China
- Products: buses
- Website: Liaoning Shuguang Automotive Group

Changzhou Changjiang Bus was a bus manufacturer based in Changzhou, Jiangsu, China. Changzhou Changjiang was reported to be the largest bus builder in China. Buses are manufactured under the Changjiang brand.

In 2007, Liaoning Shuguang Automotive Group acquired Changzhou Changjiang Bus and merged the bus operations with Huanghai Bus.

== China Flxible Bus ==
In 1994, Flxible's parent company, General Automotive Corporation, along with three other American companies—Penske Corporation, Mark IV Industries, and Carrier Corporation—formed a joint venture with Changzhou Changjiang Bus, a Chinese manufacturer located in Changzhou, Jiangsu, to produce buses based on the Flxible Metro design and with the Flxible name. The resulting company, China Flxible Auto Corporation, manufactured buses in a variety of lengths, from 8 m (26 ft 3 in) to 11 m (36 ft 1 in). These buses, which included both front- and rear-engine designs, and share only their general exterior appearance with the American-built Flxibles, were sold to many transit operators in major Chinese cities, including Beijing and Shanghai.

Additionally, a trolleybus version was manufactured exclusively for the Hangzhou trolleybus system, which bought a total of 77 units between the late 1990s and 2001. However, for these vehicles, Changzhou Changjiang supplied the chassis and Metro-style bodies to the Hangzhou Changjiang Bus Company (in Hangzhou), which then completed the conversion into trolleybuses.

== Changzhou Iveco joint venture ==
Changzhou Changjiang and Iveco of Italy set up a 50:50 joint venture in 2001 called Changzhou Iveco Bus Co. The venture focused on producing various types of city buses, bus chassis and parts. The joint had the capacity to manufacture 6,000 to 7000 buses per year.

However, in 2007, the partnership was dissolved when Iveco sold its 50% stake in the venture for just $1 US to Changjiang.

== Models ==
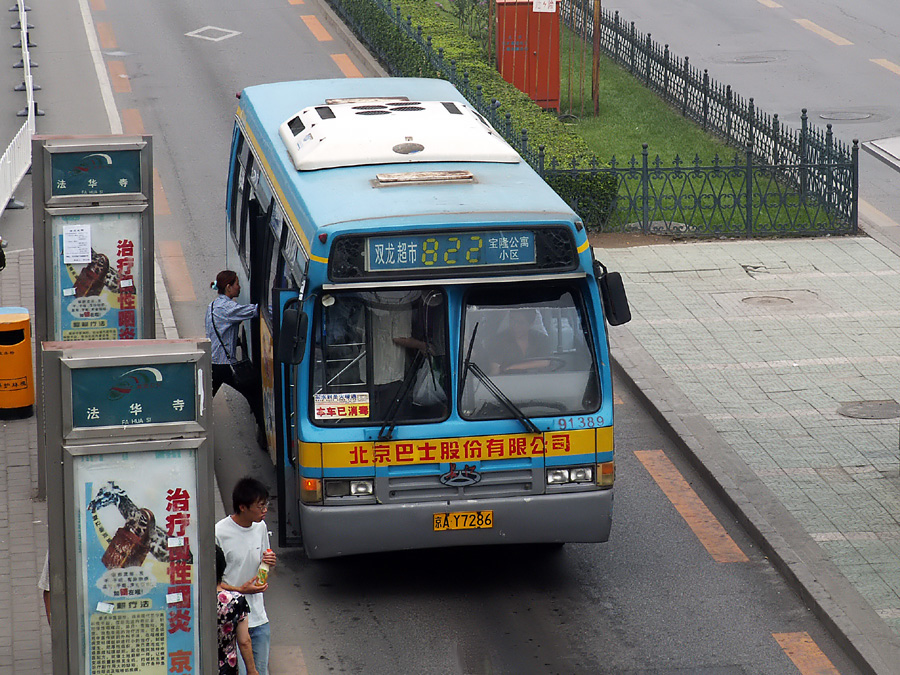
China Flxible bus

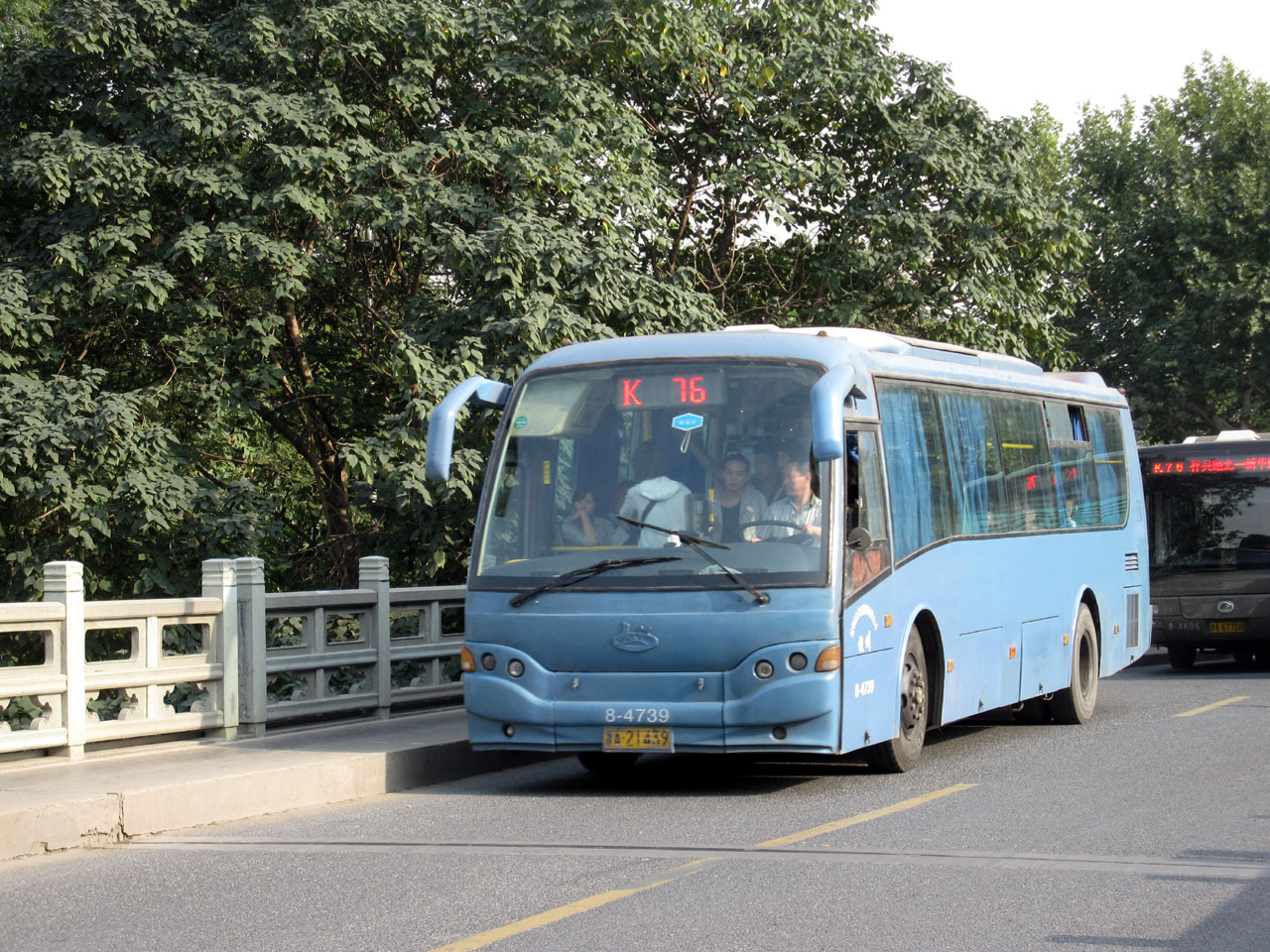
Changjiang CJ6101G2C11HK

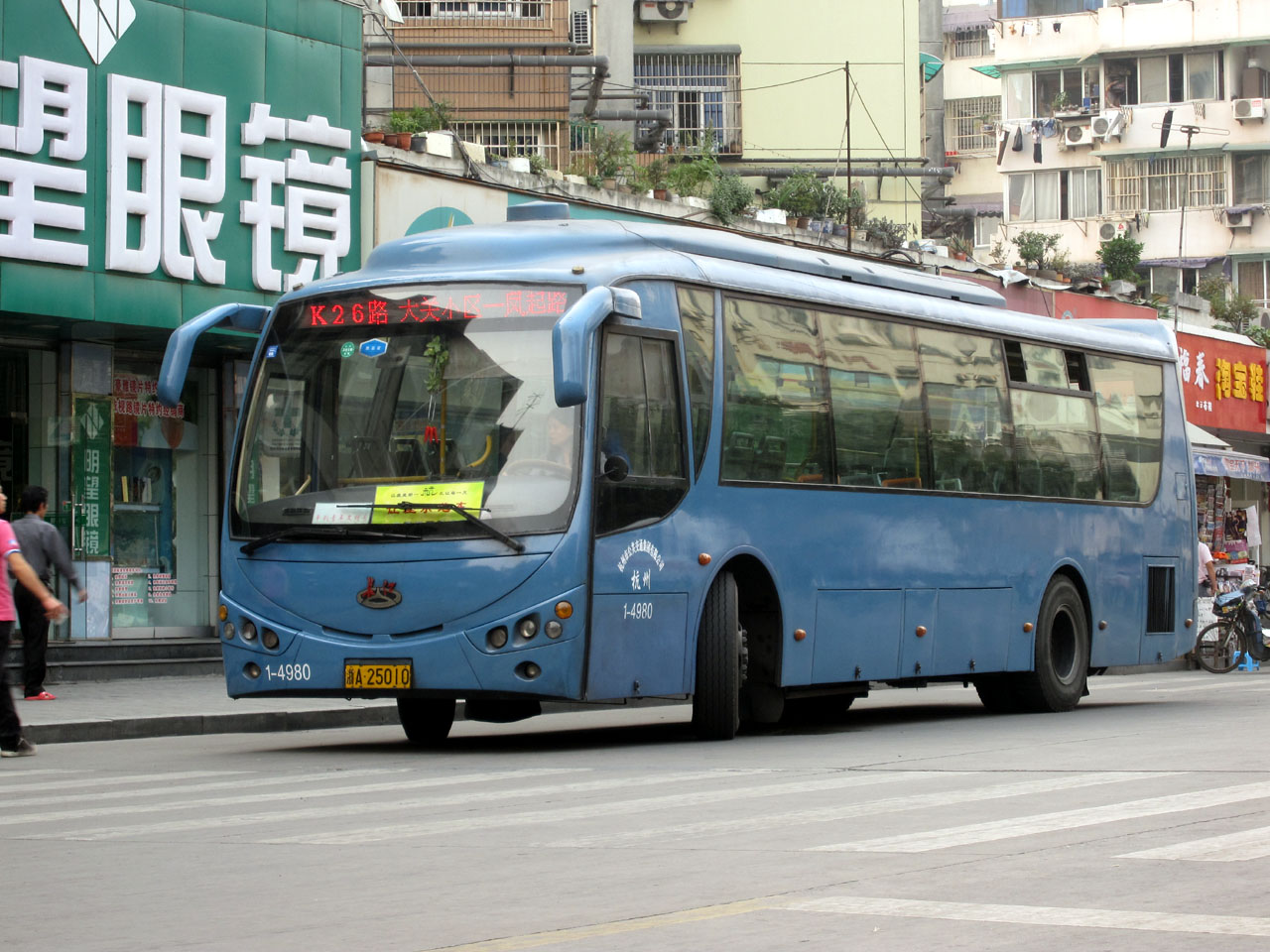
Changjiang CJ6101G7C13HK

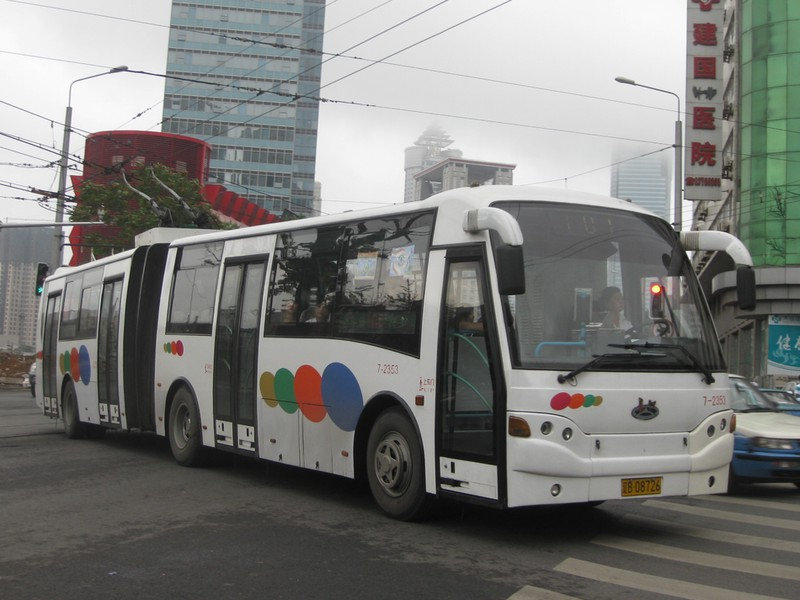
Changjiang CJWG150

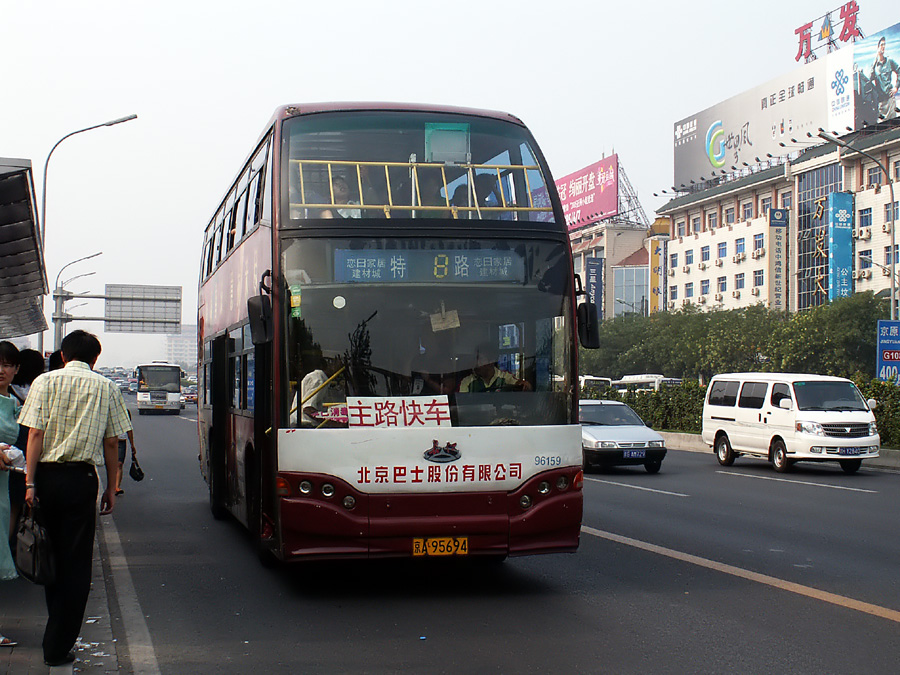
Changjiang double decker bus
