= Huayang Auto =

Former brand of Chinese cars

- Founded: 1987; 38 years ago
- Defunct: 2008
- Headquarters: Wuhu, Anhui, China

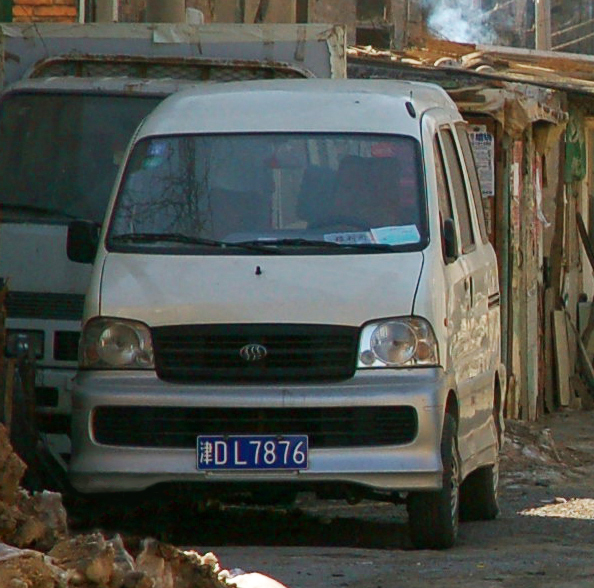
Huayang BHQ 6361B in Tianjin

Huayang was a Chinese brand of cars built by the Anhui Huayang Auto Manufacturing Co., Ltd. Founded in the early 1990s, their first product was based on the Suzuki Carry minivan and was called the BHQ 6350/6351/6360. Soon after 2000 the 5-7 seat Daihatsu Atrai-based BHQ 6361B minivan was introduced. There is also a version with a 165 mm (6 in) longer rear overhang, called the BHQ 6376B. Both of these use a 1,051 cc engine producing 52 PS (38 kW). Other versions include the BHQ 6406B and the BHQ 1020B truck, which features a very large bed.

On November 5, 2004, it was announced that the Lifan Group will acquire Anhui Huayang Auto immediately to produce series of mini commercial vehicles. Huayang Auto Manufacturing Co., Ltd. is a private complete auto enterprise located in Wuhu city, Anhui province, and it has the production list of complete autos, and its major product is a series of mini commercial vehicles. In 2004, this company will market about 5,000 mini commercial vehicles.

Lifan has become the shareholder of Yunnan Dali Junma Auto Company by 250 million yuan cash and resources, in the meantime, this company has also invested in engineering vehicle project in Sichuan. Lifan has owned the full complete production chain including saloon cars, commercial vehicles, and special vehicles.
