= Zhidian Automobile =

Chinese electric vehicle manufacturer

- Industry: Automotive
- Founded: 17 July 2018
- Founder: Ma Jianfeng
- Headquarters: Zhuzhou, Hunan, China
- Area served: China
- Key people: Ma Jianfeng
- Products: Electric vehicles

Hunan Zhidian Smart New Energy Vehicle Co., Ltd. (Chinese: 湖南智点智能新能源汽车有限公司), more commonly known as Zhidian Automobile, is a Chinese electric vehicle company based in Zhuzhou, Hunan.

== History ==
Zhidian Automobile was founded on 17 July 2018 by Ma Jianfeng.

On 28 June 2021, Zhidian Automobile celebrated the completion of its first vehicle assembly plant in Zhuzhou.

== Vehicles ==
Zhidian Automobile plans to produce the following vehicles:

- Zhidian F101, a small electric commercial vehicle line consisting of a microvan and minitruck
- Zhidian K201, a 4-door electric compact pickup truck

== Market and Impact ==
The company's vehicles are designed to meet the needs of the logistics industry, with vehicle volumes ranging from 3 to 20 cubic meters, covering approximately 60% of the industry's requirements.
