= Spotlight Automotive =

Chinese electric vehicle manufacturer

Spotlight Automotive Ltd.
- Company type: Joint venture
- Industry: Automotive
- Founded: 10 July 2018; 7 years ago
- Headquarters: Zhangjiagang, Jiangsu, China
- Key people: Zhao Guoqing (Chairman)
- Products: Automobiles
- Owner: BMW Group (50%); Great Wall Motor (50%)
- Number of employees: 3,000

Chinese name
- Simplified Chinese: 光束汽车
- Hanyu Pinyin: Guāngshù Qìchē
- Website: en.spotlight.cn

Spotlight Automotive Ltd. (Chinese: 光束汽车; pinyin: Guāngshù Qìchē) is a joint venture between BMW and Great Wall Motor (GWM) founded in 2018 to develop and produce Mini-branded battery electric vehicles in China.

== History ==
In November 2019, following an agreement in 2018, BMW and GWM established Spotlight Automotive.

Its manufacturing plant in Zhangjiagang, Jiangsu was constructed between 2020 and 2022. Its first mass-produced vehicle, a Mini Cooper SE (J01) rolled off from the plant on 14 October 2023.

== Products ==
=== Mini ===
- Mini Cooper E/SE (J01) (2023–present), subcompact hatchback, BEV
- Mini Aceman (J05) (2024–present), subcompact SUV, BEV
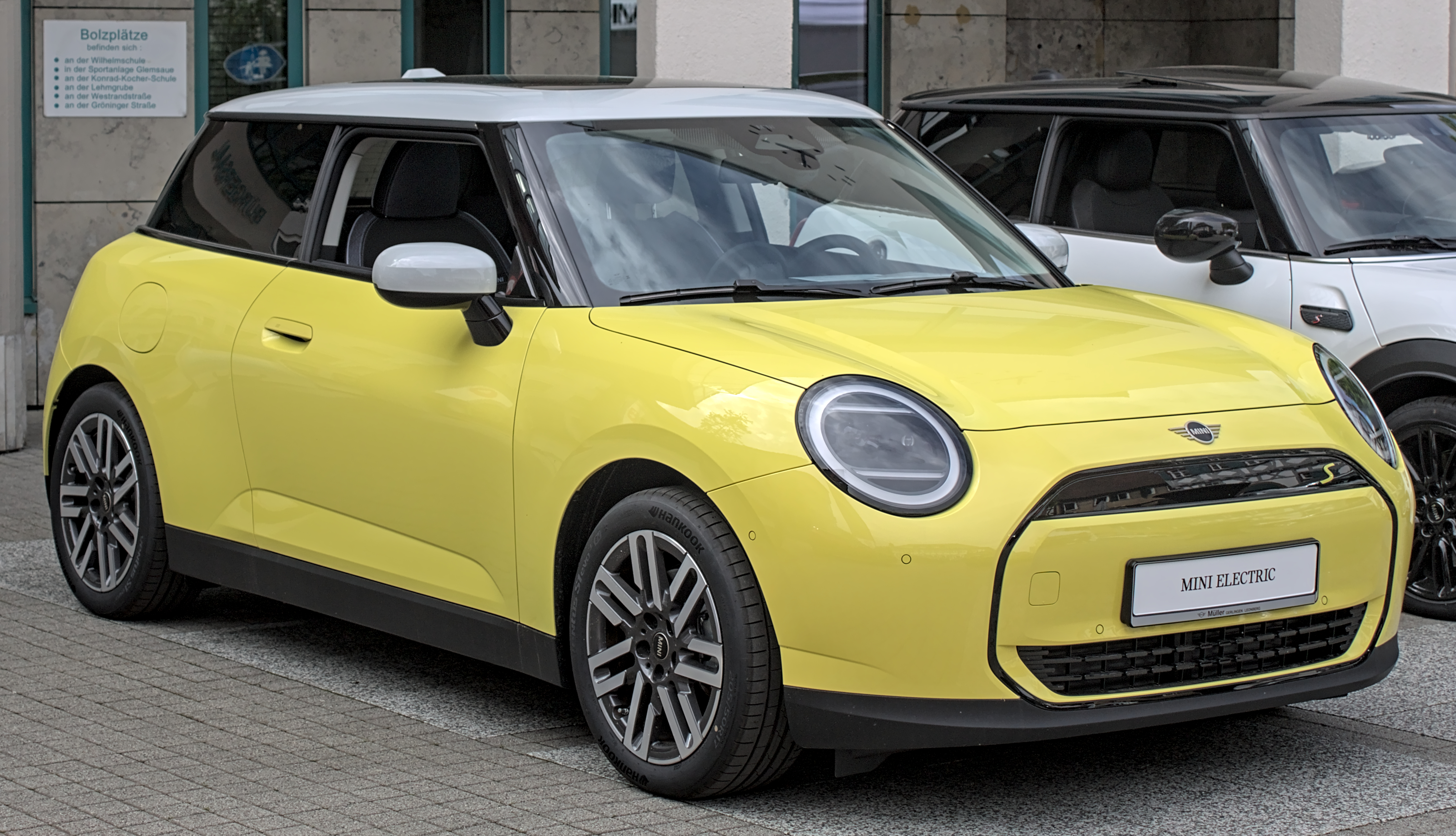
Mini Cooper SE (J01)

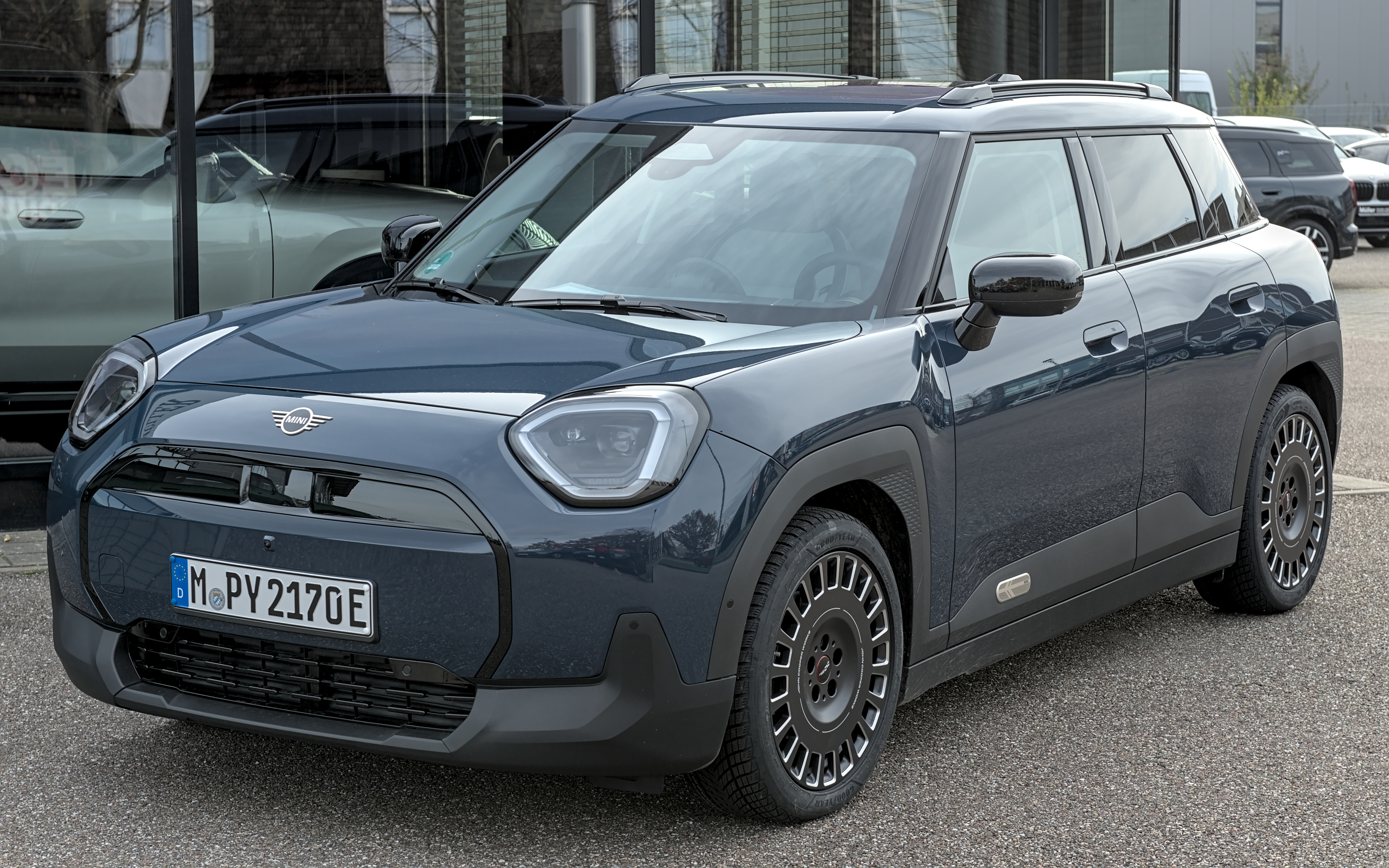
Mini Aceman (J05)

=== Ora ===
- Ora Lightning Cat/07 (2022–present), mid-size fastback sedan BEV
  - Ora Lightning Cat Touring (to commence), mid-size station wagon, BEV
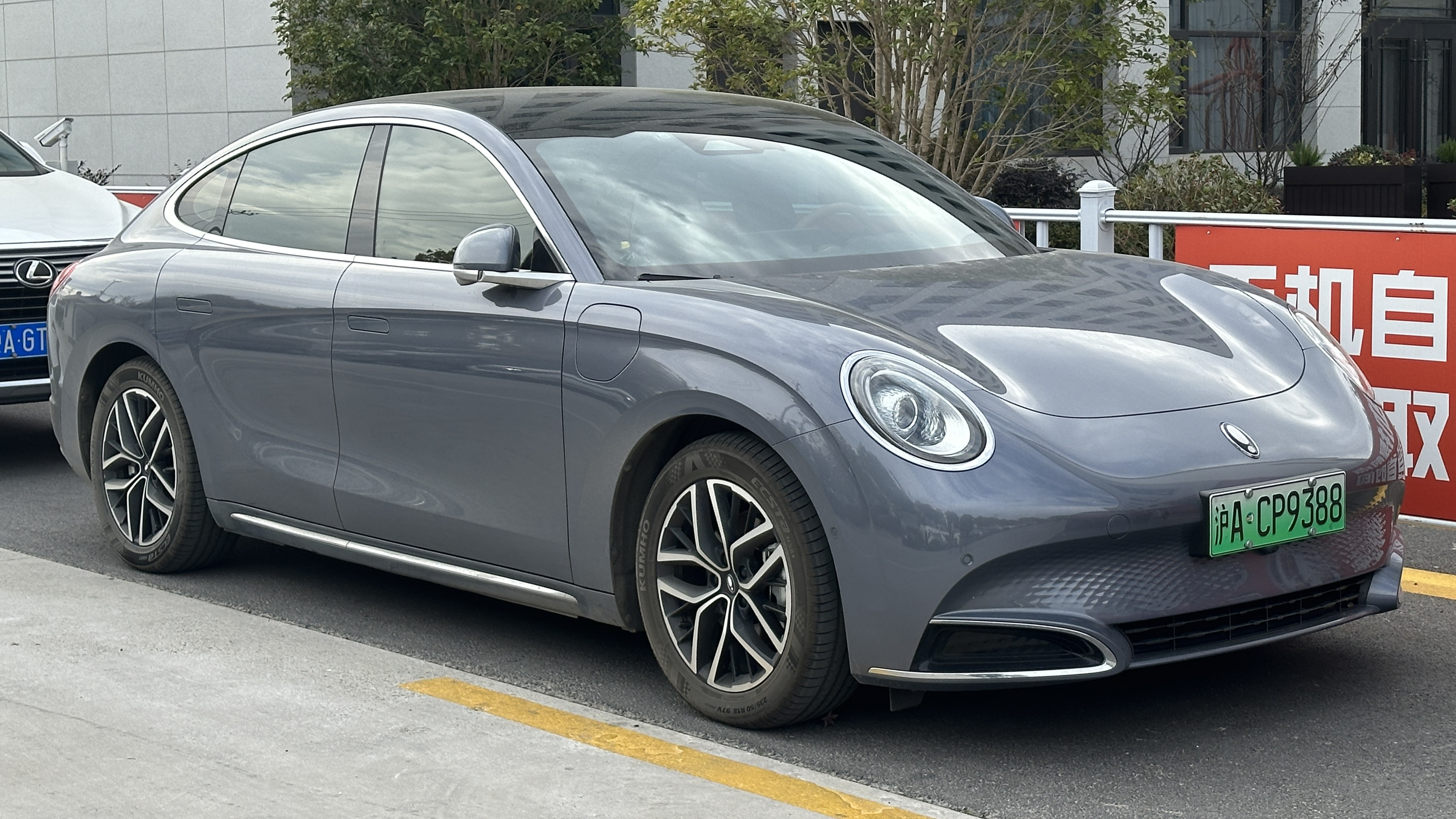
Ora Lightning Cat

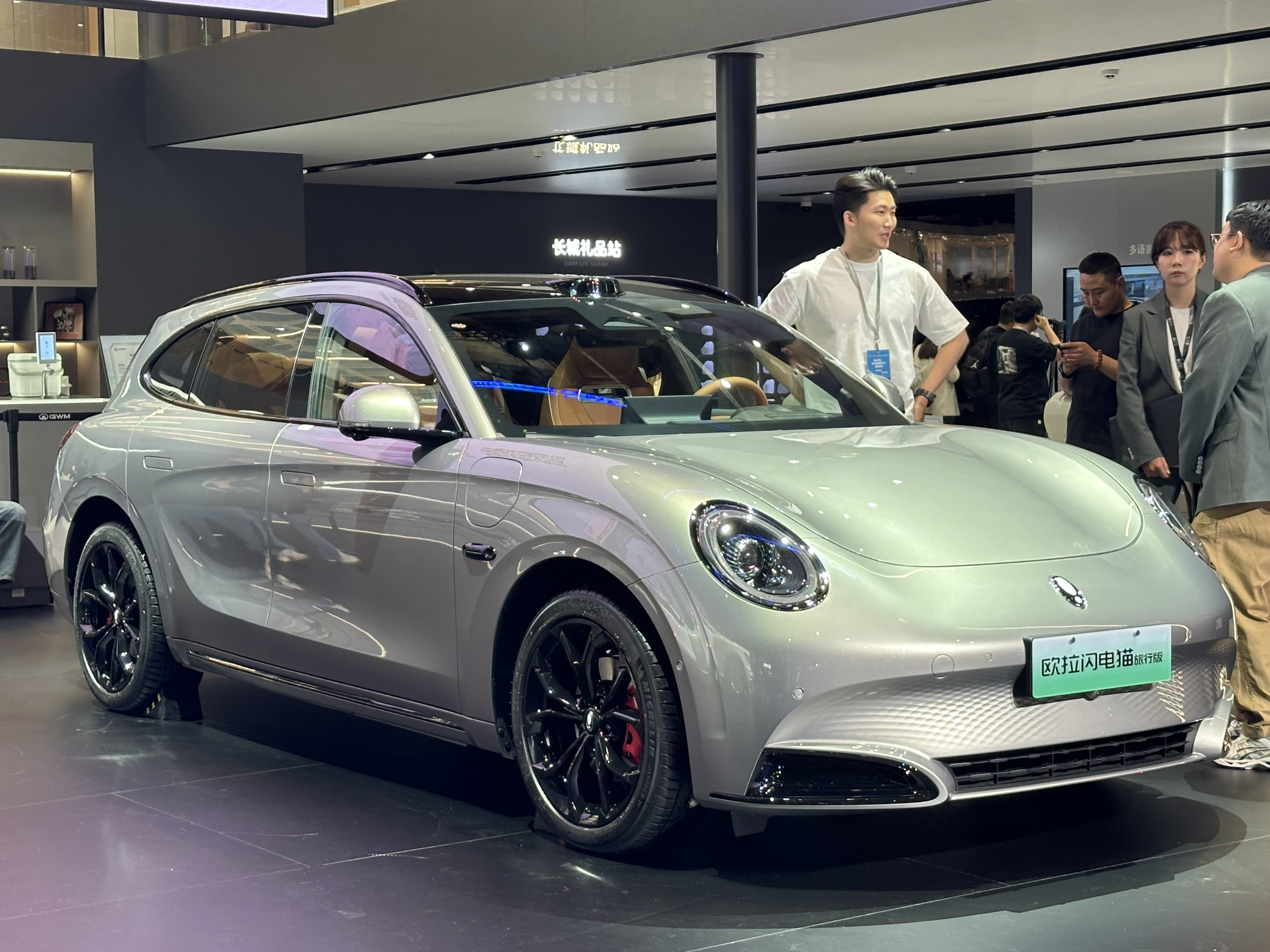
Ora Lightning Cat Touring
