= Saidou Technology =

Chinese electric vehicle manufacturer

Saidou Technology Co., Ltd
- Native name: 重庆赛豆科技有限公司
- Formerly: Chongqing Landian Technology Co., Ltd
- Type: Public
- Industry: Automotive
- Founded: June 2026; 2 months ago (as Saidou)
- Headquarters: Chongqing, China
- Products: Automobiles
- Owners: Chongqing Municipal Government (34.5%) Seres Auto (Hubei) (32.96%); Employee ownership (16.48%); CATL (9.89%); Jiangsu Bojun Technology (5.12%) Xingyu (1.03%)

Saidou Technology Co., Ltd. (重庆赛豆科技有限公司) is a Chinese electric vehicle manufacturer headquartered in Chongqing. The company was originally established as a brand of Seres Group called Landian in March 2023, and underwent a major restructuring in 2026, emerging as an independent entity with significant stakes held by the Chongqing municipal government, Seres, and CATL. In May 2026, the company was renamed and subsequently launched its new automotive brand, Aiva, in collaboration with ByteDance.

== History ==
=== Landian brand (2023-2025) ===
The Landian (Chinese: 蓝电; pinyin: Lándiàn; lit. 'blue electricity') brand was introduced by Seres Group in March 2023 as a mass‑market electric vehicle marque, positioned below the premium AITO brand co‑developed with Huawei's Harmony Intelligent Mobility Alliance (HIMA).

Despite Seres' commitment to support the brand with core technology and R&D, Landian's sales remained sluggish. In 2025, total annual sales were approximately 20,000 units, averaging around 1,000 units per month, and by early 2026 the monthly volume for the E5 dropped to about 500 units. The brand faced intense competition in its price segment and lacked the Huawei intelligent features that distinguished the AITO lineup.

=== Strategic restructuring and spin‑off ===
On 8 February 2026, Seres signed a cooperation agreement with the Shapingba District Government of Chongqing to restructure the assets related to the Landian brand. Under the plan, Seres would contribute Landian's assets into a newly established company, into which a government‑led investment fund, together with other investors and management teams, would inject cash.

In March 2026, the state investor temporarily withdrew, and Seres held 100% of the new entity. Subsequently, in April, Seres transferred the Landian assets into the new company as part of the planned spin‑off. On 25 May 2026, the company completed a capital increase of approximately RMB 6.671 billion, introducing five investors and fundamentally changing its ownership structure.

After the capital increase, the shareholding structure stood as follows:

- Chongqing Shapingba District Government (through Shazhi Yuanyuan Investment), 34.5%, becoming the largest shareholder.
- Seres Group (through Seres Hubei), 32.96%, reduced from majority control.
- Yuexing Jiasheng (employee ownership platform), 16.48%
- Wendeng Investment (a CATL subsidiary), 9.89%
- Jiangsu Bojun Technology, 5.12%.
- Xingyu Co., Ltd., 1.03%

As a result, Seres lost control over the company, which was no longer consolidated into its financial statements. The new board comprised five members, with Seres holding only one seat.

=== Renaming to Saidou Technology and new brand AIVA (2026-present) ===
On 29 May 2026, the company was officially renamed Chongqing Saidou Technology Co., Ltd. The name "Saidou" is widely interpreted as a combination of "Seres" (Sai) and "Doubao" (Dou), reflecting its new technological partnership with ByteDance's Doubao large language model.

On 9 June 2026, Saidou Technology unveiled its new automotive brand, AIVA (standing for "Artificial Intelligence Voyage Ahead"), at a launch event in Beijing. The first production model, the Aiva ME7, is scheduled for market launch later in 2026, with all future models targeting the premium segment above RMB 200,000.

Unlike the AITO brand, which relies on Huawei's technology, Saidou's AIVA models will adopt an intelligent solution developed in partnership with ByteDance's Volcano Engine for providing the Doubao LLM for AI cockpit, multimodal interaction, and driver‑assistant features. The Chinese autonomous driving company DeepRoute.ai will provide for advanced NOA capabilities.

In June 2026, ByteDance issued a statement on clarifying that it has no equity stake in Saidou and is solely a technology supplier, not an automaker.

== Products ==
=== AIVA ===
- AIVA ME7 (to commence), mid-size coupe SUV, BEV/PHEV

=== Landian ===
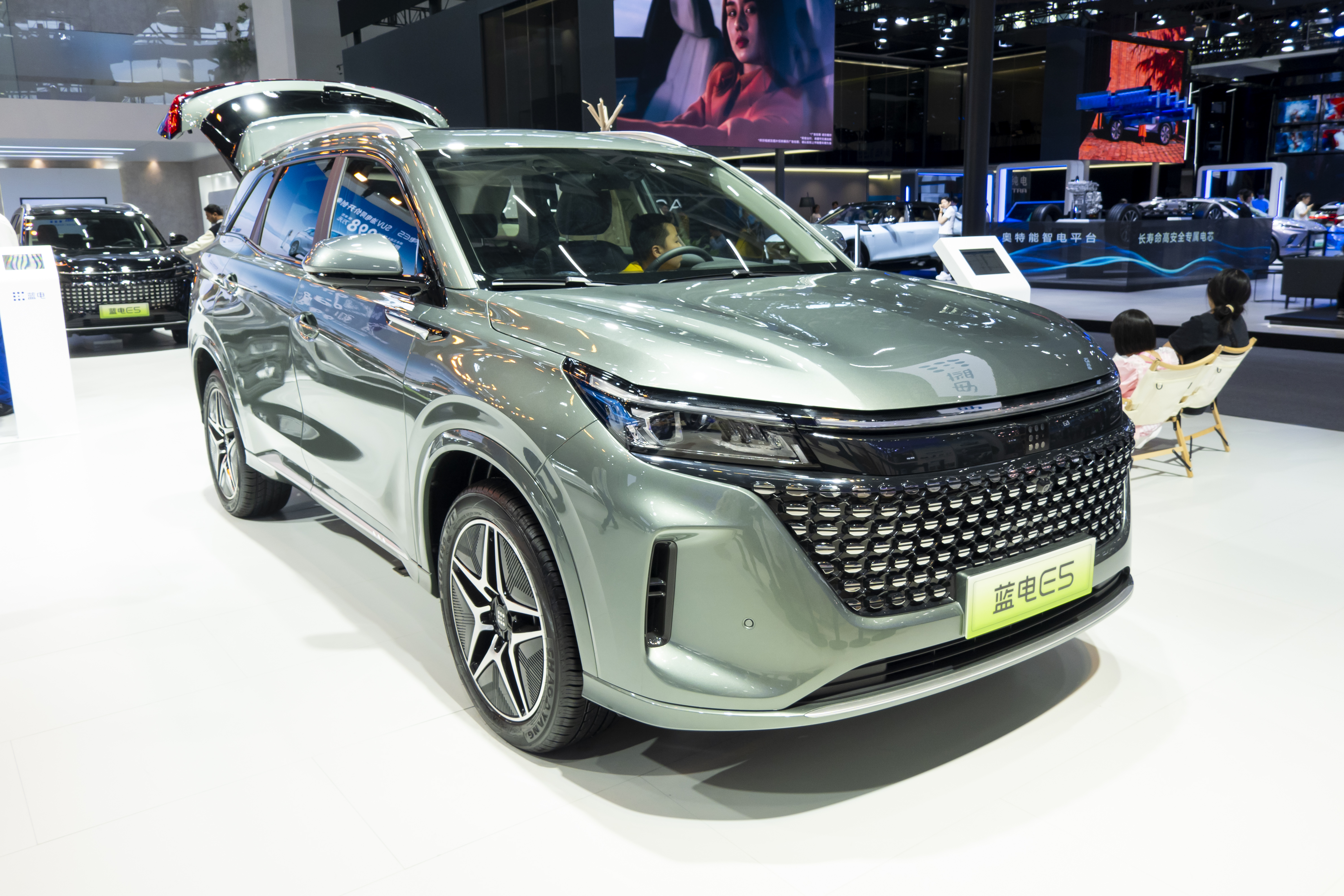
Landian E5

Landian (Chinese: 蓝电) was a brand of Seres for budget electric vehicles which was established in March 2023. Saidou inherited its operation since 2026.

- Landian E5 (2022–present), compact SUV, rebadged PHEV variant of Fengon 580
- Landian E3 (2023–present), subcompact SUV, rebadged Fengon E3

== See also ==
- AITO
- Seres Group
- Doubao
- DeepRoute.ai
