= Hunkt =

Chinese automobile manufacturer

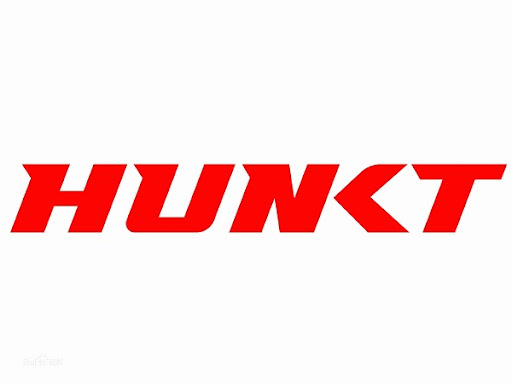
- Type: Private
- Industry: Automotive
- Founded: 2016; 10 years ago
- Founder: Zotye Auto
- Defunct: 2020
- Website: hunkt.com and www.hanlongqiche.com

Hunkt (Chinese: 汉龙), also called Hanlong (Chinese: 汉龙旷世) and Huatong (Chinese: 华通), was a Chinese automobile manufacturer that specialized in developing SUVs. It was founded by Zotye Auto.

== History ==
Hunkt was founded in 2016, and is located in Daye, Hubei, China. They have founded partnerships with Bosch, ZF, Mitsubishi, Valeo, Horse, BorgWarner, Tenneco, Delphi, Marelli, and United Automotive Electronics. Hunkt built a 1,200 acre factory area that cost 1 billion yuan.

Originally planning to start producing new energy vehicles, the gasoline powered Hunkt Canticie was their first vehicle. It is powered by a 2.0-litre turbo engine that gives 218 horsepower (163 kW; 221 PS) horsepower and a 185 km/h (115 mph) top speed. It has rear-wheel drive and 8-speed automatic transmission. The Canticie has dimensions of 4,985 mm (196.3 in)/1,995 mm (78.5 in)/1,819 mm (71.6 in), and a wheelbase of 2,997 mm (118.0 in). The regular edition costs 126.800 yuan, and the extended version costs 179.800 yuan. It has similar design features to a Land Rover.

In November 2020, the company stopped production as it encountered financial difficulties. In 2022 the remaining assets of the company were auctioned, but failed to attract any bids. It was previously rumored that Great Wall Motor would take over the assets.

== Vehicles ==
=== Current Models ===
Hunkt had 1 production vehicle.

Model	Photo	Details
Hunkt Canticie/Kuangshi		Body style: SUV Doors: 5 Seats: 7 Power: 2.0 turbo engine Production: 2019 Revealed: 2017

== See also ==
- Fukang
- Evergrande
