= Soar Automotive =

Chinese motor vehicle manufacturer

Qingdao SOAR Automotive Group, Ltd. 青岛索尔汽车集团
- Industry: Automotive
- Founded: 1991 (Qingdao)
- Defunct: 2011
- Headquarters: Qingdao, Shandong, China
- Products: Automobiles, Custom cars
- Website: www.qingdaosoar.com (in Chinese)

Soar Automotive (officially Qingdao SOAR Automotive Group, Ltd.) (青岛索尔汽车集团) is a Chinese motor vehicle manufacturing company headquartered in Qingdao. It is specialized in coach building bespoke vehicles including ambulances, police cars, funeral hearses, limousines, courtesy buses and special military vehicles. The company Jinma Auto Refit Works from Qingdao started producing automobiles in 1990, 1996 or 1997.

Soar was formed in 1991 through the merger of a number of Qingdao-based automotive companies and has produced automobiles since 2001. In 2011, the production of passenger cars ended. The company continues to operate in the field of vehicle conversion and recovery vehicles.

== Operations ==
The Soar corporate campus in Qingdao includes 40,000 square meters of buildings. Around 80 engineers and 180 other professional staff are based at the site.

== Products ==
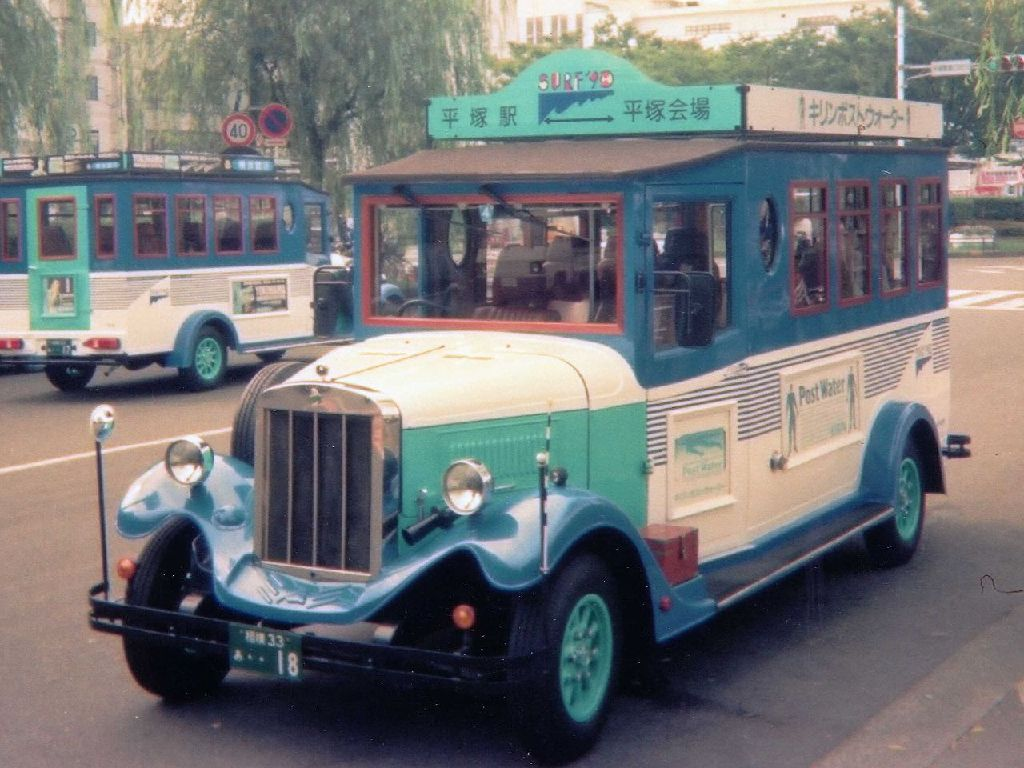
An Asquith Mascot courtesy bus produced by Soar

Soar's products include specialised military vehicles, patient transport vehicles, funeral hearses, bespoke luxury cars, exhibition vehicles and other vehicles for special use.

Soar's early vehicles included the Saint Horse, an open-top fire-fighting vehicle in a 1920s retro style, and a courtesy bus produced under license from Asquith Mascot Courtesy Bus. Based on the Ford Transit chassis, the third model was the idiosyncratic Shengma camper van.

Since late 2008, Soar has produced a reinterpretation of the Rolls-Royce Phantom V, based on the platform of the Brilliance BS6. It is powered by a Mitsubishi 2.4 litre four-cylinder engine which generates 100 kW and 200 nm.

In addition, Soar produces a retro-style funeral hearse based on the platform of the Brilliance BS4, and a luxury car also based on the BS4 named SOAR 1 single.
