= Fuqi International =

Fuqi International, Inc.
- Type: Public
- Founded: 2001
- Defunct: 2013
- Fate: Defunct
- Headquarters: Shenzhen, China
- Website: fuqi.irpage.net

Fuqi International (formerly traded as Nasdaq: FUQI) is a designer of precious metal (gold and platinum) jewelry for the luxury goods market in China. It also manufactures jewelry items that contain diamonds and other precious stones on a custom-order basis. Fuqi is a Delaware corporation with its principal executive office located in Shenzhen, China. Fuqi operates through its wholly owned subsidiary, Fuqi International Holdings Co., Ltd., a British Virgin Islands corporation and its wholly owned subsidiary, Shenzhen Fuqi Jewelry Co., Ltd., a company established under the laws of China.

== History ==
Fuqi was founded in 2001 and had its IPO in 2007. As of December 31, 2008 (the date of its last 10-K SEC filing), Fuqi had 69 jewelry retail counters and stores in China and approximately 950 employees. 97% of its revenue came from wholesale jewelry sales.

On March 29, 2011, Fuqi was de-listed from NASDAQ and has been trading on OTC Pink since.

=== Class action lawsuit ===
On March 17, 2010, FUQI's shares declined more than 35% overnight, following an announcement of the company's accounting errors and internal control deficiencies, to close at $11.90 per share, on trading volume 20 times the usual.

Several class action lawsuits were filed in April, with a consolidated class action complaint filed on Feb 15, 2011, by ABRAHAM, FRUCHTER & TWERSICY, LLP.

== Awards ==
- "5 Stocks Approaching Greatness" - Motley Fool, March 9, 2010
- “Chinese Famous Brand”, by China Light Product Quality Assurance Center; “Famous Brand in the China Jewelry Industry”, by Gems & Jewelry Trade Association of China; one of the “Shenzhen 300 enterprises with Ultimate Growth”, by Shenzhen City Enterprises Evaluation Association; “China Top Brand” by General Administration of Quality Supervision, Inspection and Quarantine of the People's Republic of China, October 2007
