= Mudan Auto =

Chinese bus manufacturer

- Native name: 牡丹汽车
- Founded: 1998; 28 years ago
- Headquarters: Zhangjiagang (Suzhou), Jiangsu, China
- Products: Bus
- Production output: Up to 20,000 per year
- Parent: Jiangsu Mudan Automobile Group Co, Ltd.
- Website: www.mudanauto.com

Mudan Auto is a Chinese bus manufacturer headquartered in Zhangjiagang, Jiangsu province. It was founded in 1998 as part of the Jiangsu Mudan Automobile Group Co, Ltd.. The company has an annual output of up to 20,000 buses, making it one of the largest bus producers.

== Models ==
- Mudan K-series/ K6/ K7/ K8 Mini bus
- Mudan G-series City bus
- Mudan L-series Mini bus
- Mudan X-series Mini bus
- Mudan MD5061 Mini bus
- Mudan MD6100EV City bus
- Mudan MD6106 City bus
- Mudan MD6110 Tourist bus
- Mudan MD6601 Mini bus
- Mudan MD6608 Mini bus
- Mudan MD6609 Mini bus
- Mudan MD6669 Mini bus
- Mudan MD6701 Mini bm us
- Mudan MD6703 Mini bus
- Mudan MD6720 City bus
- Mudan MD6728 Mini bus
- Mudan MD6750 City bus
- Mudan MD6820 City bus
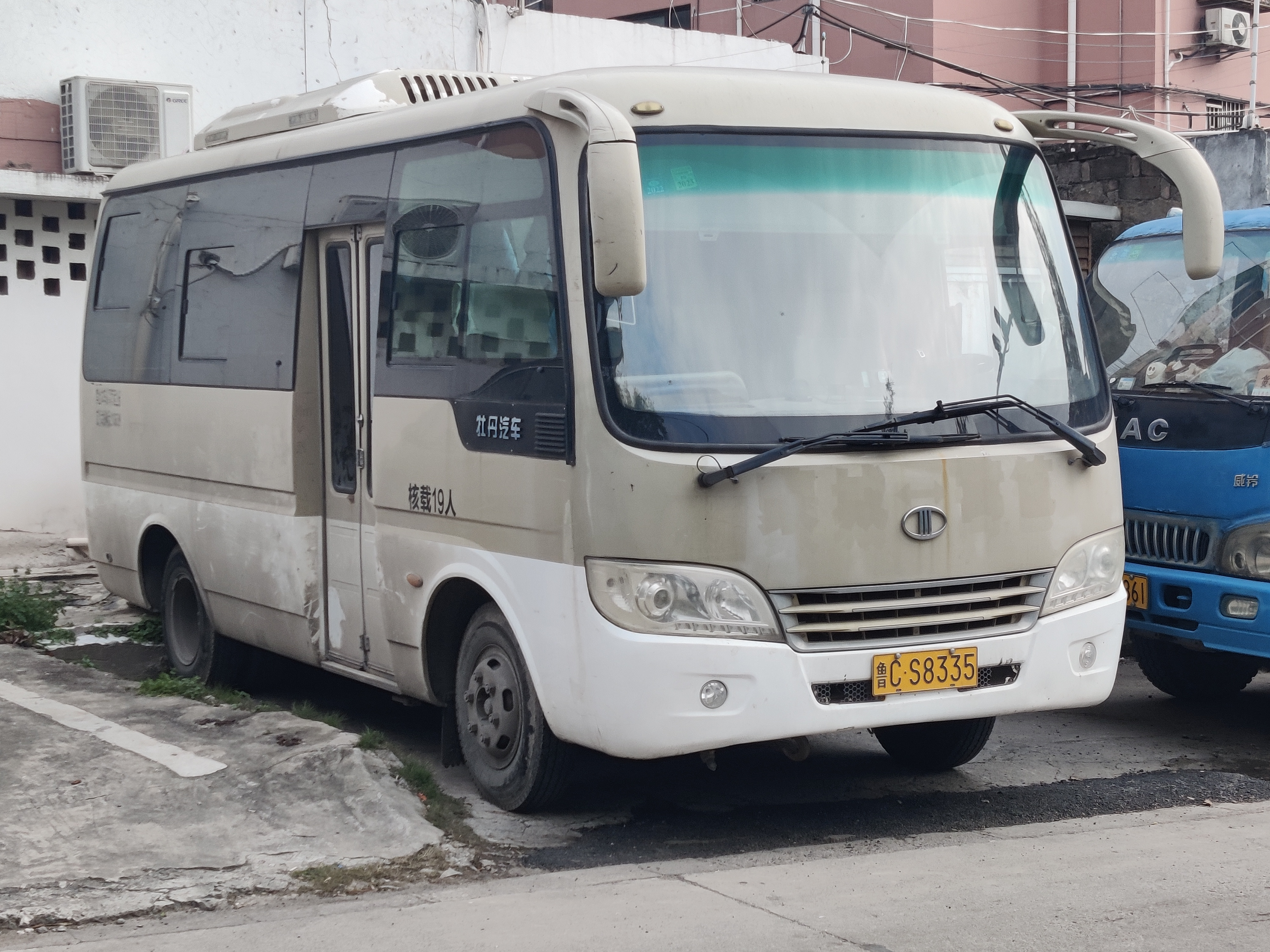
Mudan X-series

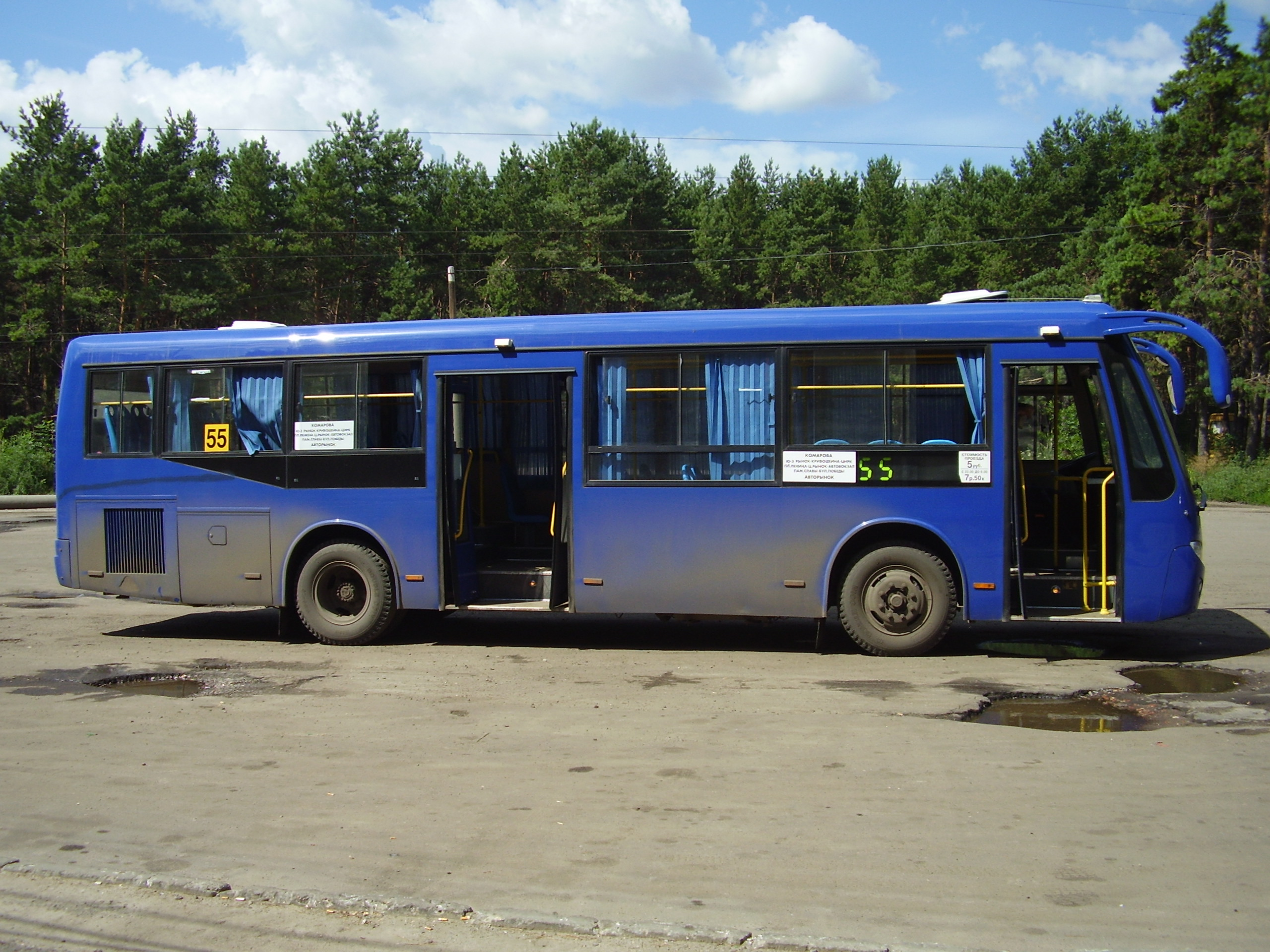
bus in Voronezh, Russia

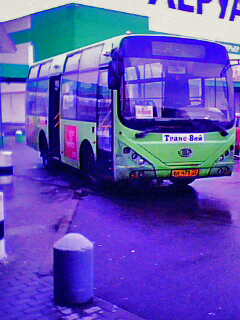
Mudan MD6750 bus

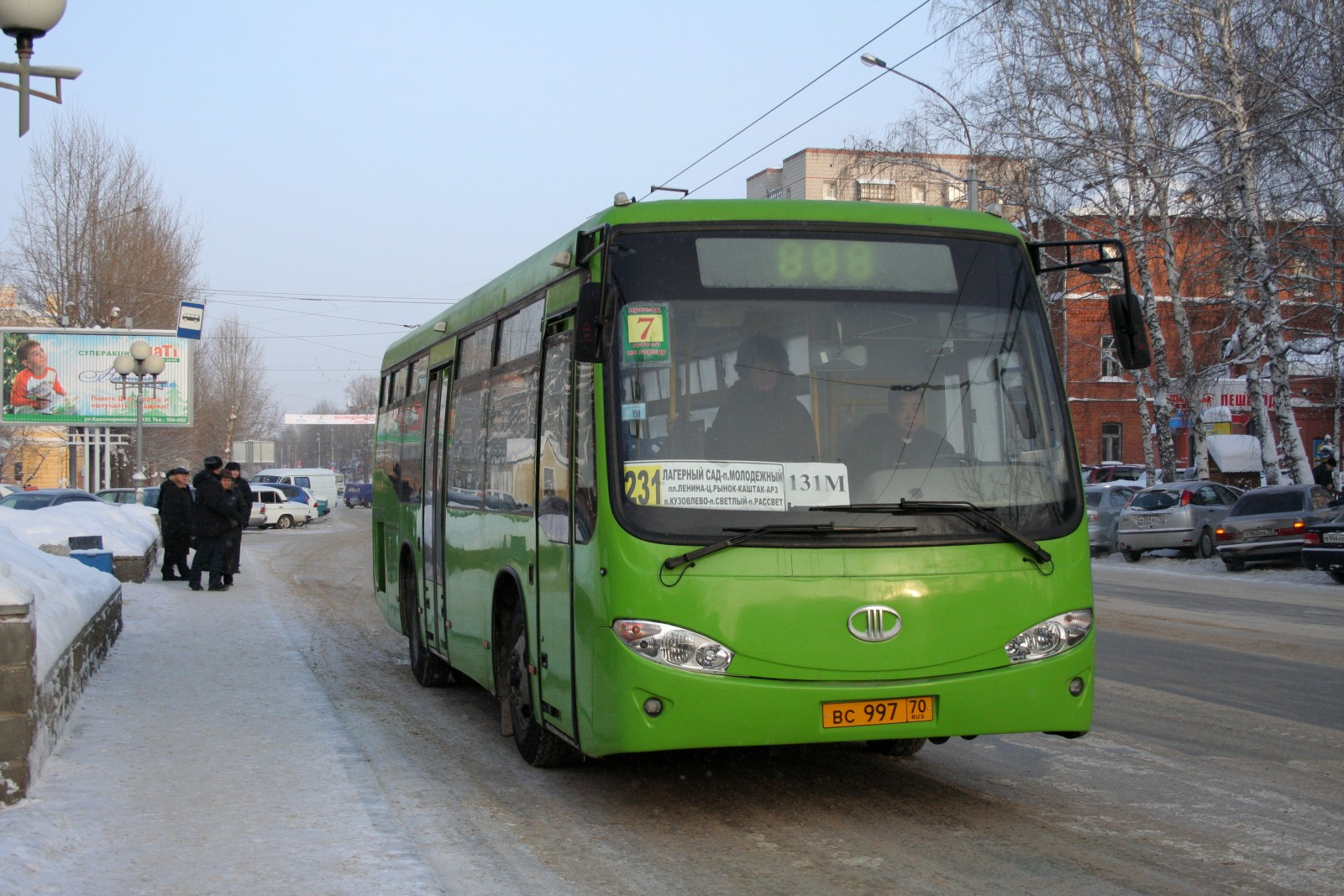
Mudan MD6106 bus

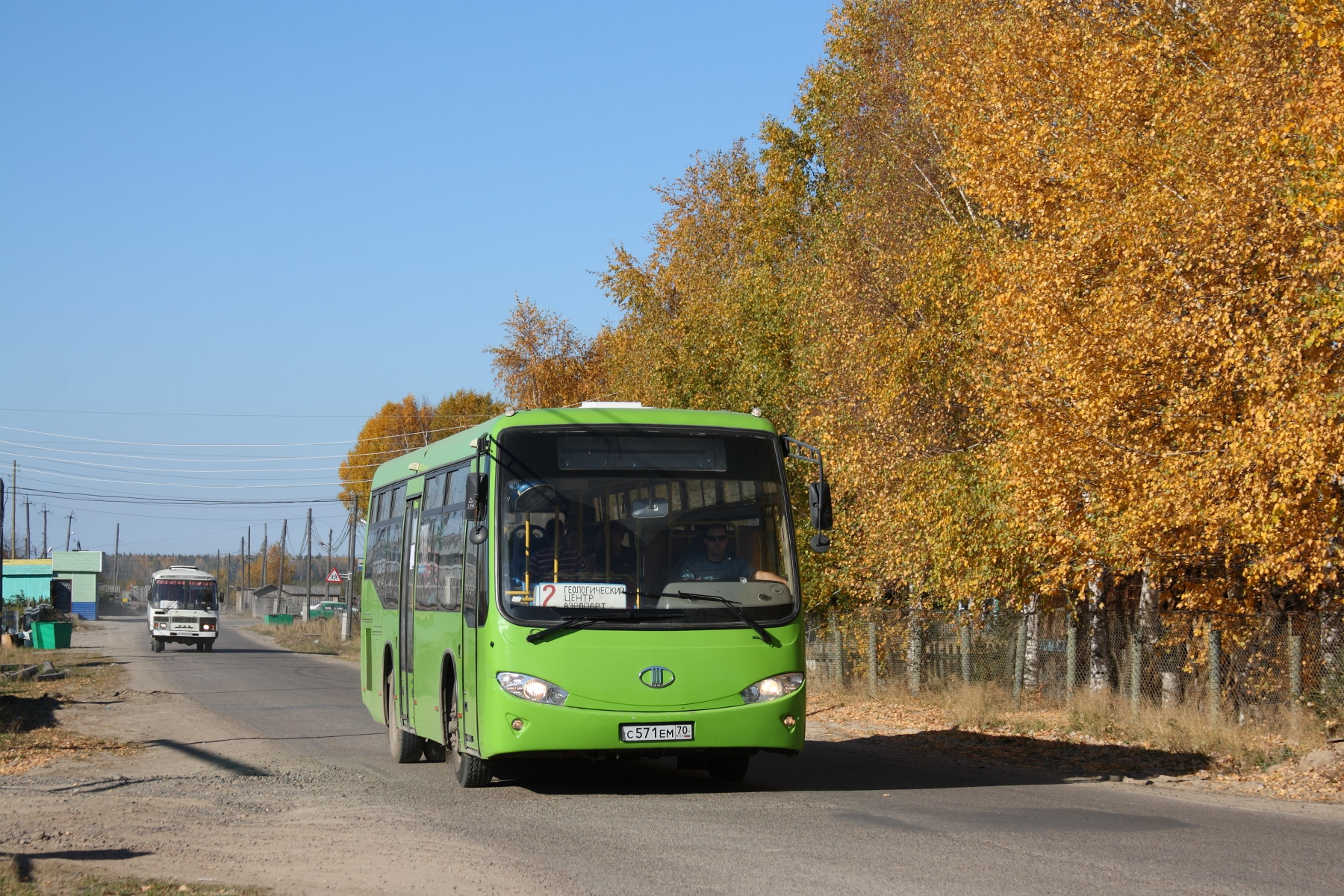
bus in Tomsk oblast, Russia
