= JMCGL =

Chinese automobile manufacturer

JMCG Light Vehicle Co., Ltd.
- Current owner: JMCG
- Country: China
- Introduced: 2013
- Markets: China

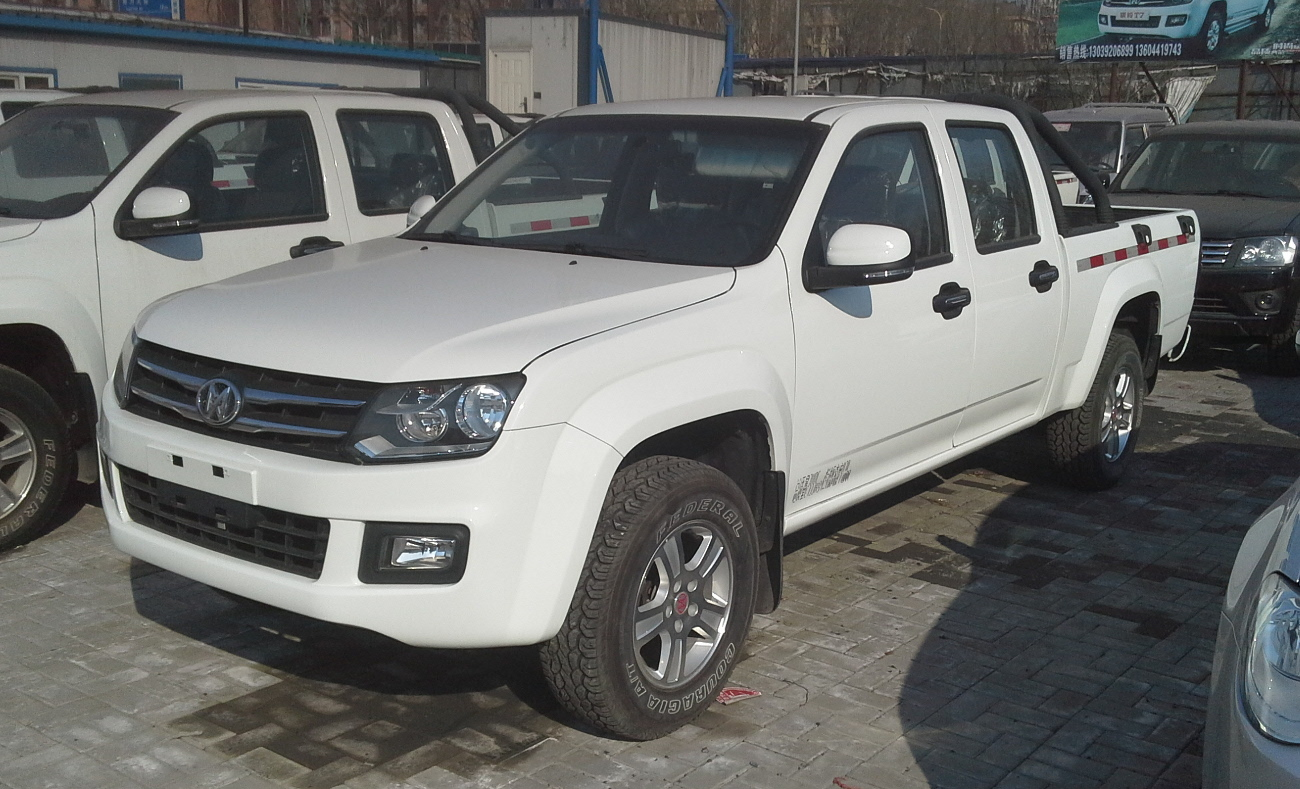
JMCGL Qiling T7

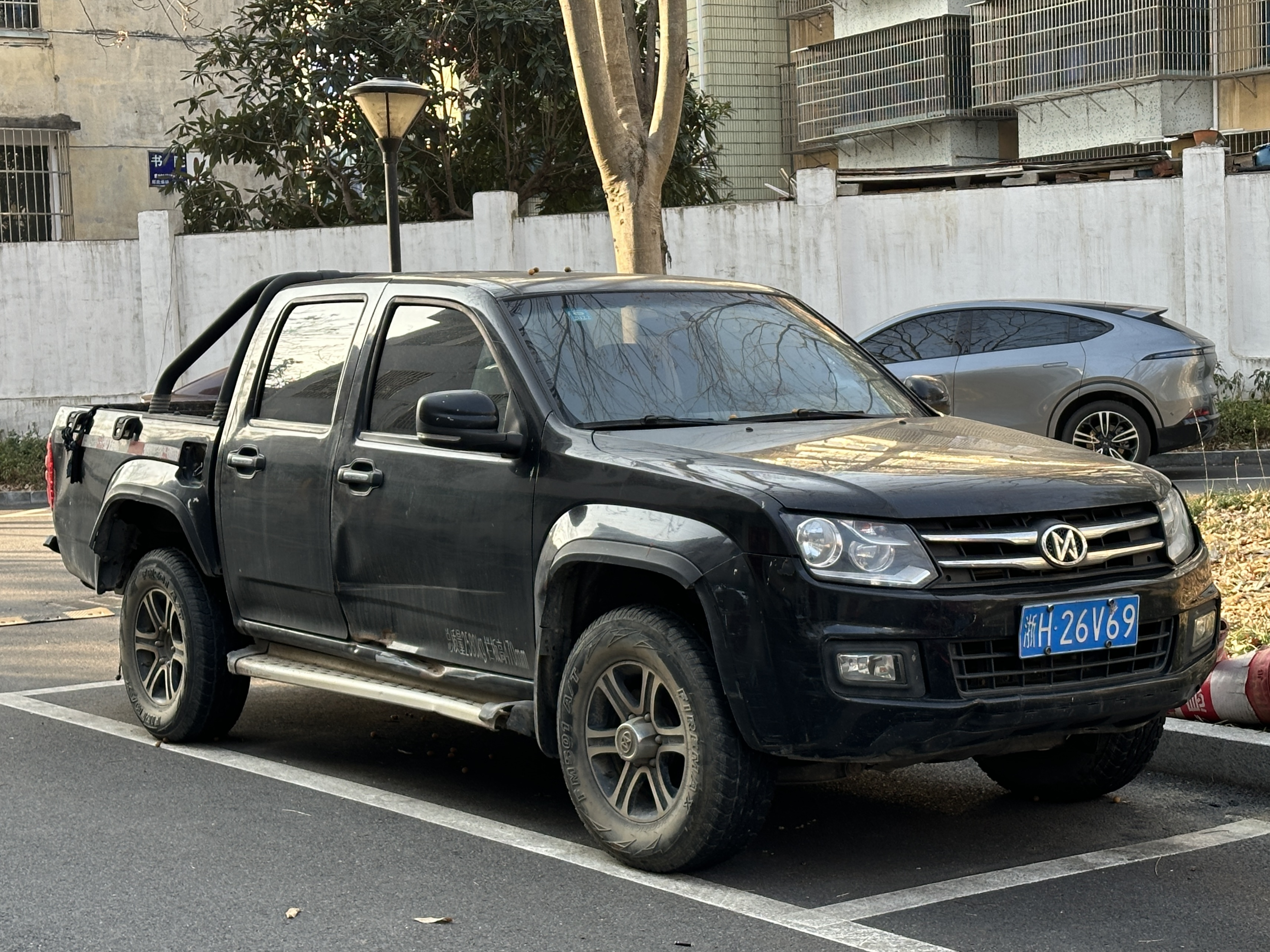
JMCGL Qiling T7 Plus

JMCG Light Vehicle Co., Ltd. (Chinese: 江铃集团轻型汽车有限公司; pinyin: Jiānglíng Jítuán Qīngxíng Qìchē Yǒuxiàn Gōngsī), also known as Jiangling Group Light Truck or JMCGL, was a Fuzhou-based pickup truck and minivan manufacturer established in early 2013 by JMCG after reorganising Huaxiang Fuqi. Fuzhou is one of the six major vehicle manufacturing bases of JMCG outside Nanchang (the others being Qingyun, Xiaolan, Changbei, Wangcheng and Taiyuan). The first product from the new company, the Qiling T5 pickup, was launched in September 2014. A second pickup, the T7, was launched in July 2015. In late 2017, JMCGL introduced the Qiling T100.

In January 2018, Jintan Auto Group acquired a 67% majority stake in JMCGL and later renamed it Jiangxi Dancheng (Dorcen) Motor Company. JMCG kept a 19% stake and the rest was taken by Fuzhou High-tech Zone Development Investment Group. The former JMCGL became one of the bases for Jintan Auto's Dorcen marque, which was launched in September 2018. As of 2019, Jiangxi Dorcen still assembles Qiling-badged pickups.
