= G60 =

G60 may refer to

== Automobiles ==
- Dorcen G60, a 2018–present Chinese compact SUV
- Dorcen G60s, a 2019–present Chinese compact SUV
- Ginetta G60, a 2012–2015 British sports car
- Ginetta G60-LT-P1, a 2018 British race car
- Toyota Century (G60), a 2018–present Japanese full-size luxury sedan
- Volkswagen G60 engine, an inline-four cylinder automobile petrol engines

== Highways ==
- G60 Shanghai–Kunming Expressway, an expressway in China

== Low-Earth orbit satellite internet megaconstellation ==
- G60 Starlink, a.k.a. Qianfan, or Thousand Sail Constellation, a Chinese satellite megaconstellation
