= Zhongding =

Chinese company

Zhongding International Construction Group Co., Ltd.
- Headquarters: Nanchang, Jiangxi, China
- Website: http://www.zhongdinggroup.com/

Zhongding International Construction Group Co., Ltd. (abbreviated as ZICG) is a Chinese construction and engineering company formed from the Zhongding International Construction Group Co., Ltd. The company is listed among the 250 largest international construction contractors in 2013, having recorded international contracting revenue of US$275.4 million.

One of the company's long time overseas operations is its subsidiary in Nepal, where it has been active since 1996.

Another important overseas market is Algeria. Since the early 1990s, an affiliated company, the Pingxiang Coal Group has worked in Algeria on dozens of medium and large projects. The construction by Zhongding of a sewage system in Oran in 2008 was used as an example in a Financial Times article titled "Algeria turns to Chinese knowhow". Also in Algeria it along with Jiangling Motors Group sought to build a special economic zone for 30-50 Chinese enterprises to establish manufacturing of automobiles, construction materials, and other products. However, a change in the Algerian foreign investment law required a local co-investor hold a majority stake in such kinds of investments, which stymied the project, putting it on hold.

In a contracting project in Botswana, it was brought on by the Chinese government to build the Gaborone Multi-Purpose Youth Center, a sports center for the youth, given as a gift by China to be used for the 2014 African youth games. Construction started in 2009 and was completed in time for a hand off ceremony in December 2012.
