= Domy X5 =

Chinese compact crossover SUV

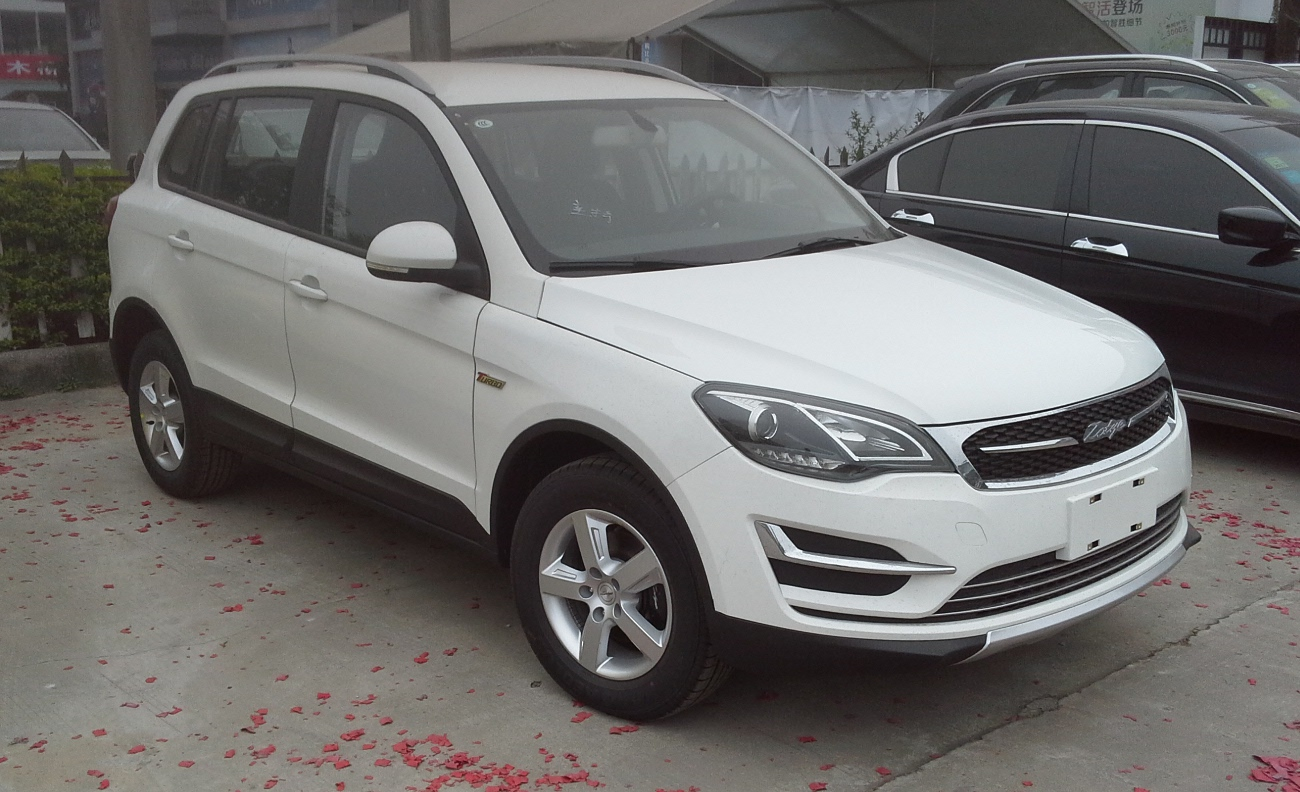

Overview
- Manufacturer: Zotye Auto
- Production: 2015–2021
- Assembly: China

Body and chassis
- Class: Compact crossover SUV (C)
- Body style: 5-door SUV
- Layout: Front-engine, front-wheel drive
- Related: Dorcen G60

Powertrain
- Engine: Petrol: 1.5 L I4 turbo
- Transmission: 5-speed manual; CVT

Dimensions
- Wheelbase: 2,680 mm (105.5 in)
- Length: 4,527 mm (178.2 in)
- Width: 1,836 mm (72.3 in)
- Height: 1,682 mm (66.2 in)

The Zotye Domy X5 (Damai X5) is a compact crossover SUV manufactured by Chinese automaker Zotye Auto under the Domy (Chinese: 大迈) product series.

== Overview ==
Revealed during the 2015 Shanghai Auto Show in China, the production version of the Zotye Domy X5 was launched later in September 2015 with prices ranging from 58,900 yuan to 111,800 yuan. Its styling is controversial as the Domy X5 slightly resembles the Volkswagen Tiguan.

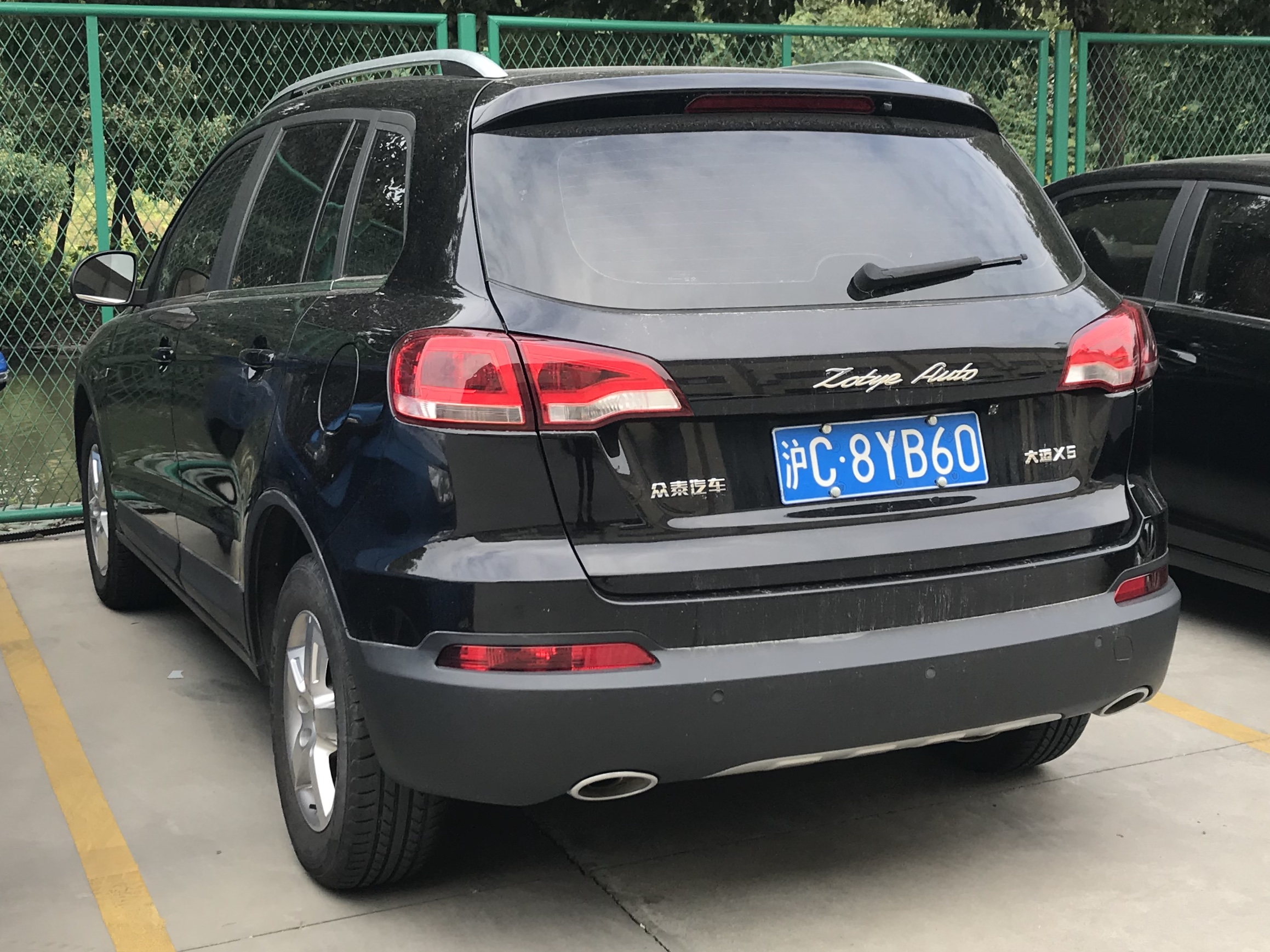
Zotye Domy X5 rear

== See also ==
- Volkswagen Tiguan - inspiration for the design of the Domy X5
