= Dorcen =

Chinese car line

- Product type: Car marque
- Current owner: Dorcen Motor Co., Ltd
- Country: China
- Introduced: 2018
- Discontinued: 2021
- Markets: Worldwide
- Ambassador: Wu Hao (founder)
- Website: http://www.dorcen.com

Chinese name
- Chinese: 大乘
- Literal meaning: Great multiply; Great vehicle
Transcriptions
Standard Mandarin
- Hanyu Pinyin: Dàchéng
- Wade–Giles: Ta^{4}-ch'eng^{2}
- IPA: [tâʈʂʰə̌ŋ]

Dorcen was a Chinese car marque introduced in September 2018 and owned by Dorcen Motor Co., Ltd. The marque vehicles were produced at facilities formerly owned by JMCG's JMCGL and Zotye Domy. The brand filed for bankruptcy in 2021. As of 2023, the brand was renamed to Docan.

== History ==
In May 2014, a company called Dancheng (Dorcen) Motor Co., Ltd. was established in Jintan District, Changzhou, based on a Zotye facility aimed at producing Domy-badged vehicles. The founder was Wu Hao, a son of a former Zotye chief. A Changzhou production base for the Dorcen company and Zotye was completed in 2015. In May 2017, Jiangsu Jintan Changdanghu New Energy Technology Co., Ltd. (Jintan Auto Group), the holding company of Dorcen Motor Co., Ltd., reorganised Fuzhou-based JMCGL, a JMCG subsidiary focused on the production of Qiling-badged pickups and minivans. In January 2018, JMCGL officially changed its name to Jiangxi Dorcen Motor Company. JMCG got a 19% of its shares, Fuzhou High-tech Zone Development Investment Group a 14% and Dorcen Motor Co., Ltd. a controlling 67%. In September 2018, Dorcen Motor Co., Ltd. unveiled its new marque, Dorcen, with three models: the electric city car E20 (based on the Zotye Domy Sesam), the mid-sized crossover G70S (based on the Zotye Domy X7) and the G60S compact crossover (a self-developed model). The G70S was immediately put on sale and the E20 later that year. A second Fuzhou plant for the assembly of the G60/G60S crossover was completed in December 2018.

Since 2019, Dorcen Auto's factory has been unable to produce due to low sales numbers with Dorcen filing for bankruptcy in 2021. As of 2022, Dorcen Auto and Huoxingshi Technology jointly established Niutron's production line to produce the Niutron NV electric crossover SUV. Dorcen Auto is responsible for providing the production facilities and automobile production qualifications. As of December 2022, Niutron announced that the firm's first EV model, Niutron NV could not be delivered fast enough, and a full refund to more than 24,000 consumers would be made within 48 hours.

In June 2023, news of the Niutron NV surfaced, with the vehicle now being sold by Docan as the Docan V07. Docan is the renamed Dorcen brand, with the Chinese name remaining to be Dacheng (大乘).

== Facilities ==
Dorcen had plants for assembly in Jiangsu and Jiangxi. The Jiangsu plant, established in 2015 by Zotye and the Jintan Auto Group, was located in the Jintan District of Changzhou. Dorcen had two plants in Jiangxi: the former JMCGL one, aimed at producing pickups and minivans, and the Jiangxi Dorcen Automotive Technology Industrial Park, established in December 2018.

As of 2022, Dorcen's former plant in Jiangxi was operated by BYD.

== Products ==
Dorcen mainly sold crossovers based on Zotye Domy and Hanteng products. Dorcen also sold products from the related Qiling (Chinese: 骐铃; pinyin: Qílíng) pickup marque (T5 and T7). In June 2018, Jiangxi Dorcen unveiled a Qiling-badged light, forward control truck named as the H300, based on the Isuzu N-series. An upcoming Chinese market product for Qiling, the T15 pickup, was unveiled at the 2019 Shanghai Motor Show. Qiling products introduced after Dorcen Motor Co., Ltd. acquisition may be identified by the JDMC (standing for Jiangxi Dorcen Motor Company) badging.

Products from Dorcen are listed below:

=== Docan ===
- Docan V07- Electric mid-size SUV

=== Dorcen ===
- Dorcen E20- Electric city car
- Dorcen G60/G60E- Compact crossover
- Dorcen G60S- Compact crossover
- Dorcen G70S- Mid-size crossover

=== Qiling (JDMC) ===
- Qiling T5 (pickup)
- Qiling T7 (pickup)
- Qiling T100 (pickup)
- Qiling H300 (light truck)
- Qiling T15 (pickup)
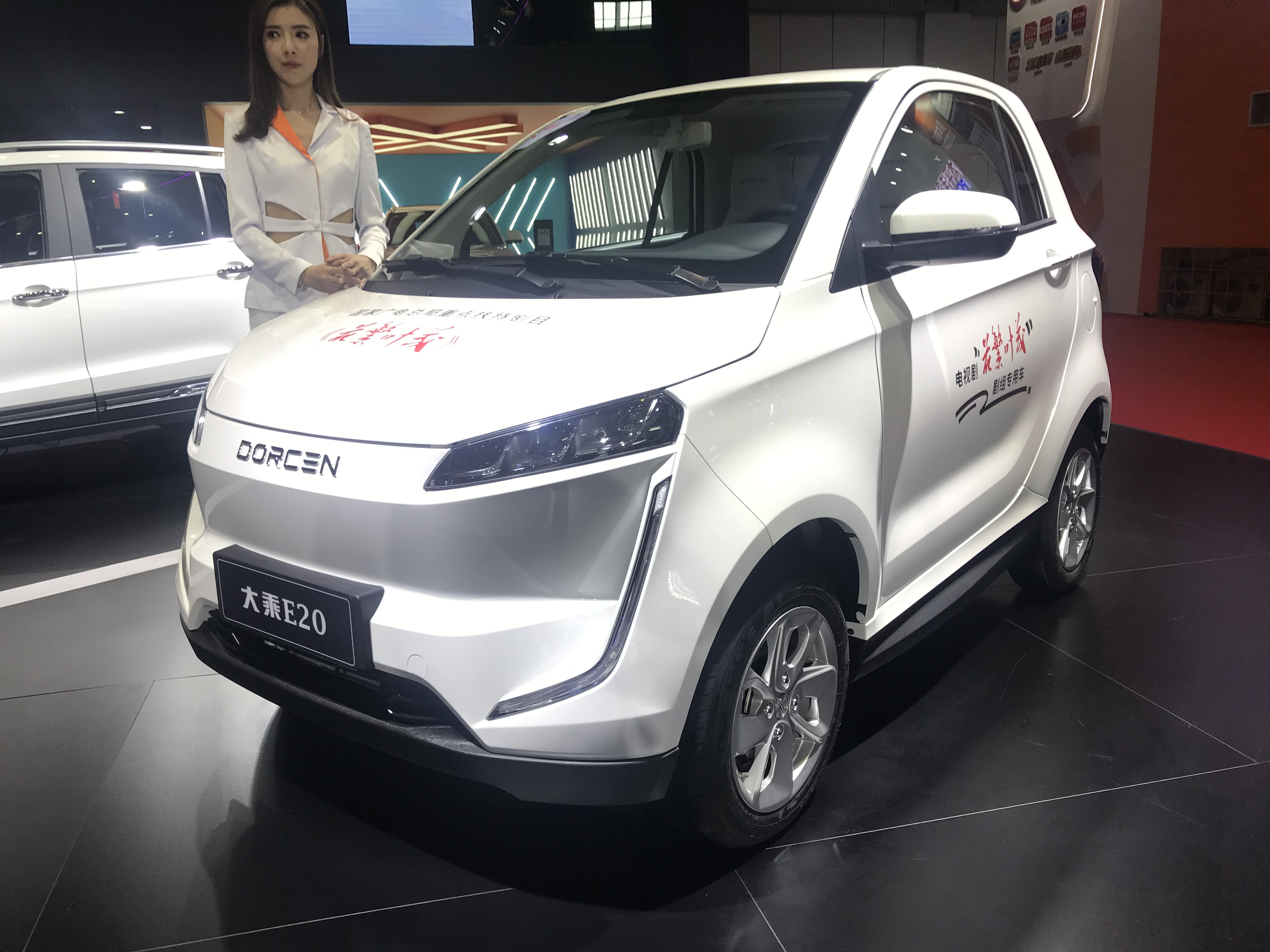
Dorcen E20

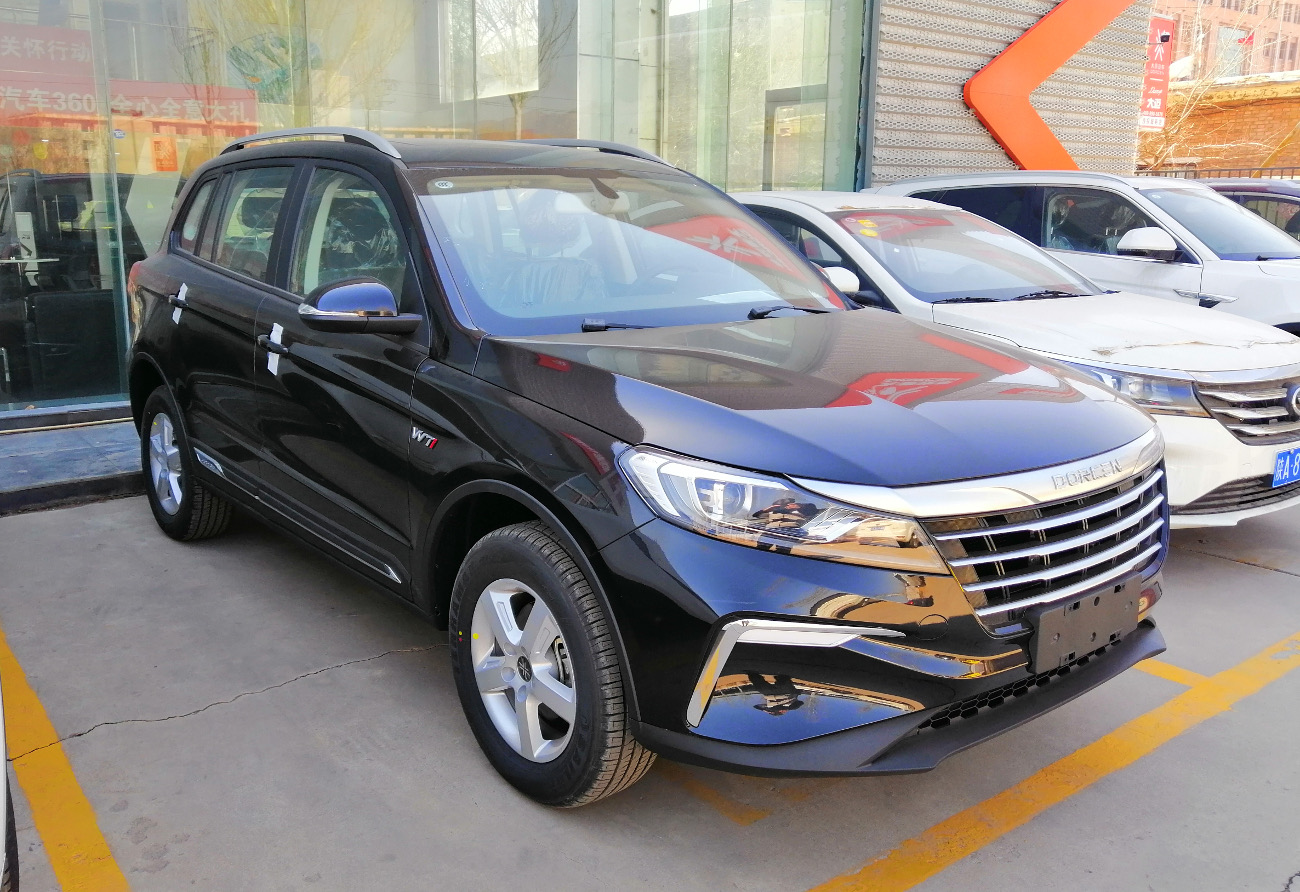
Dorcen G60

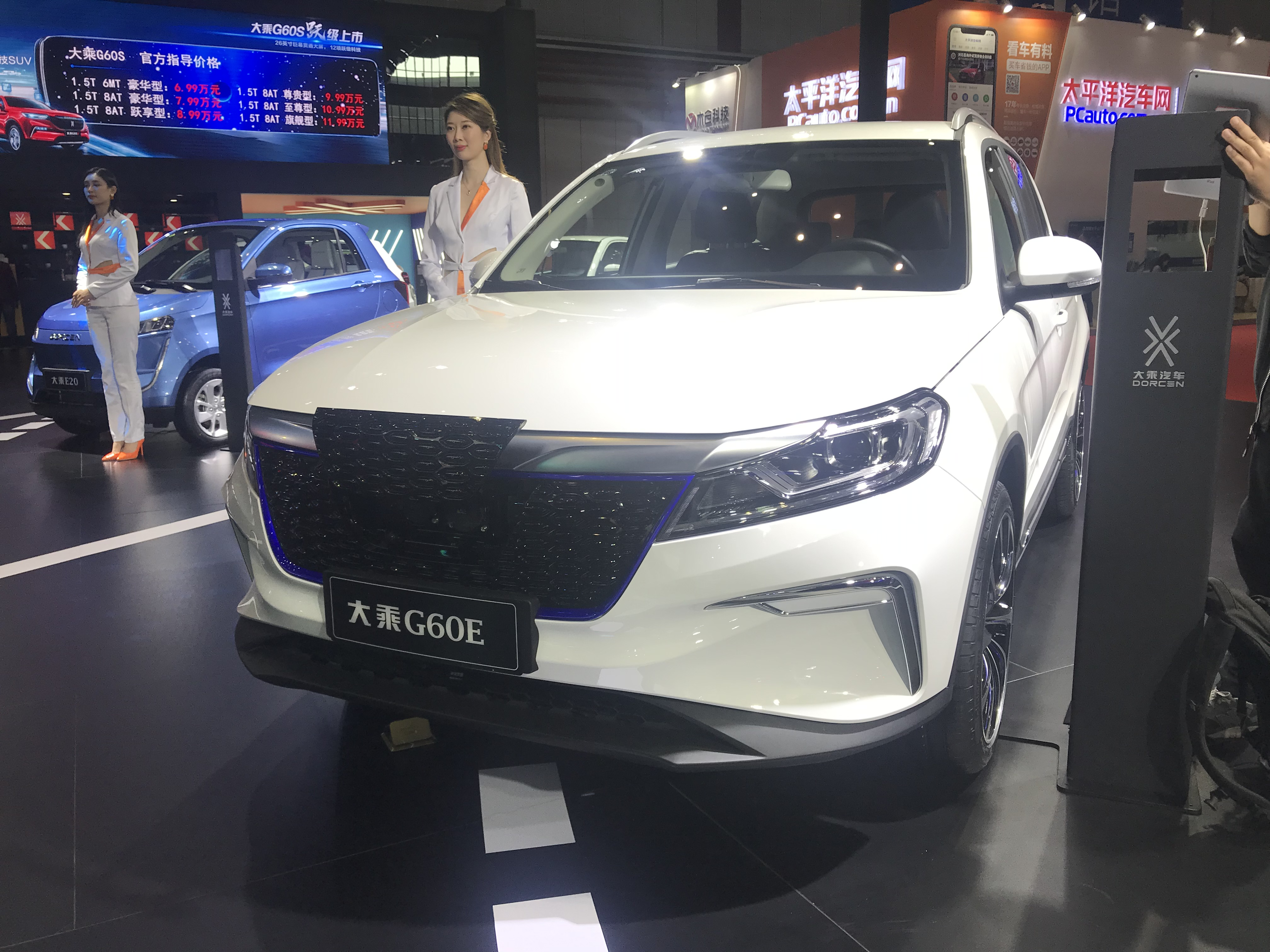
Dorcen G60E

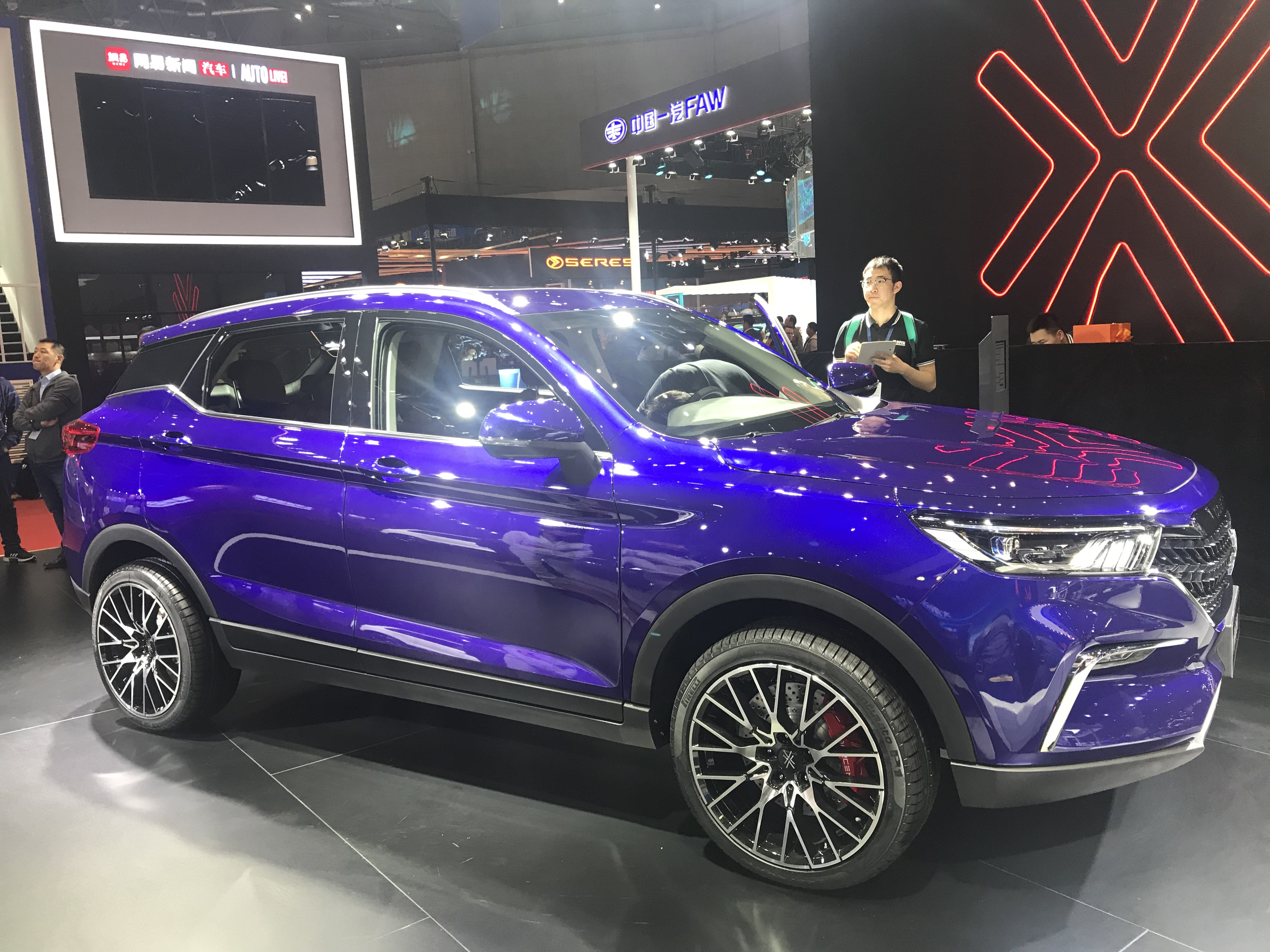
Dorcen G60S

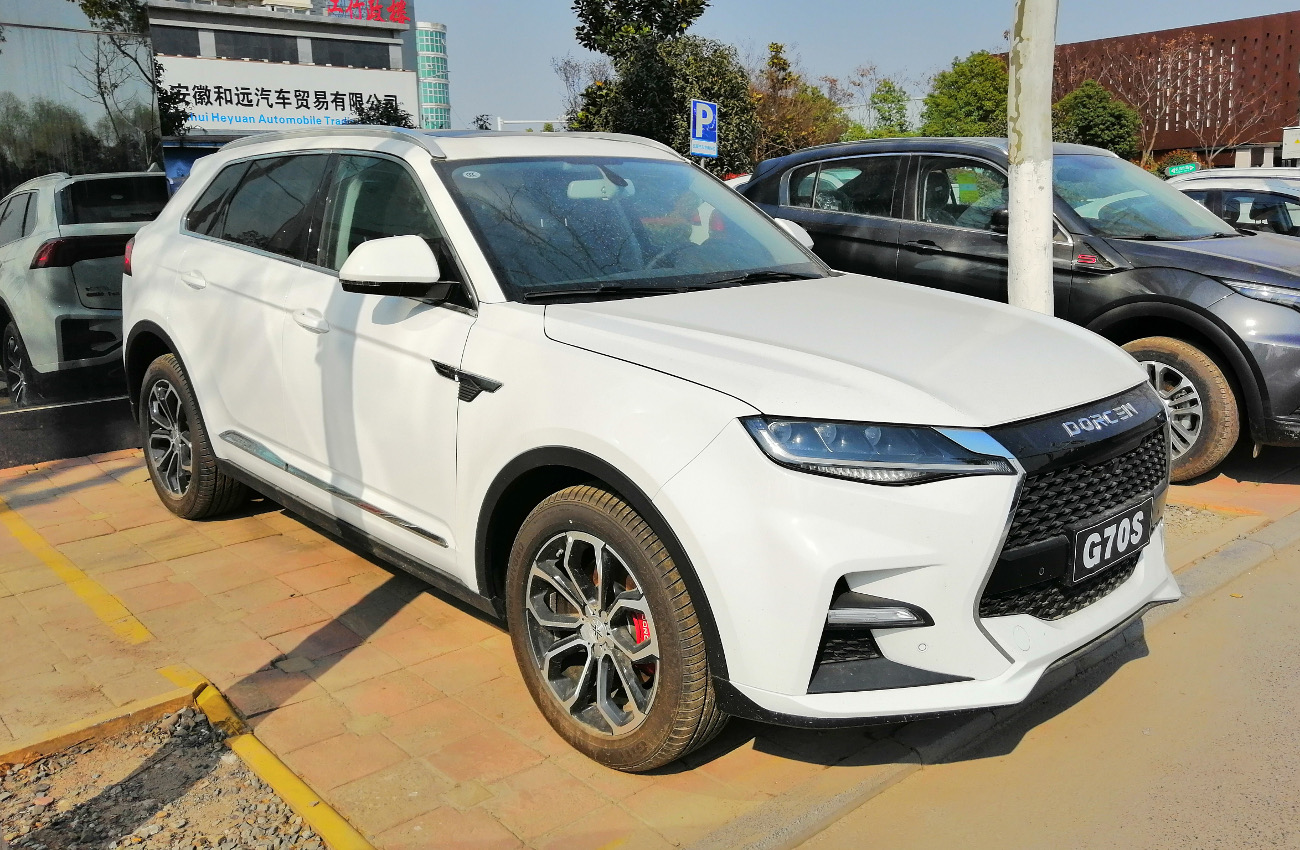
Dorcen G70S

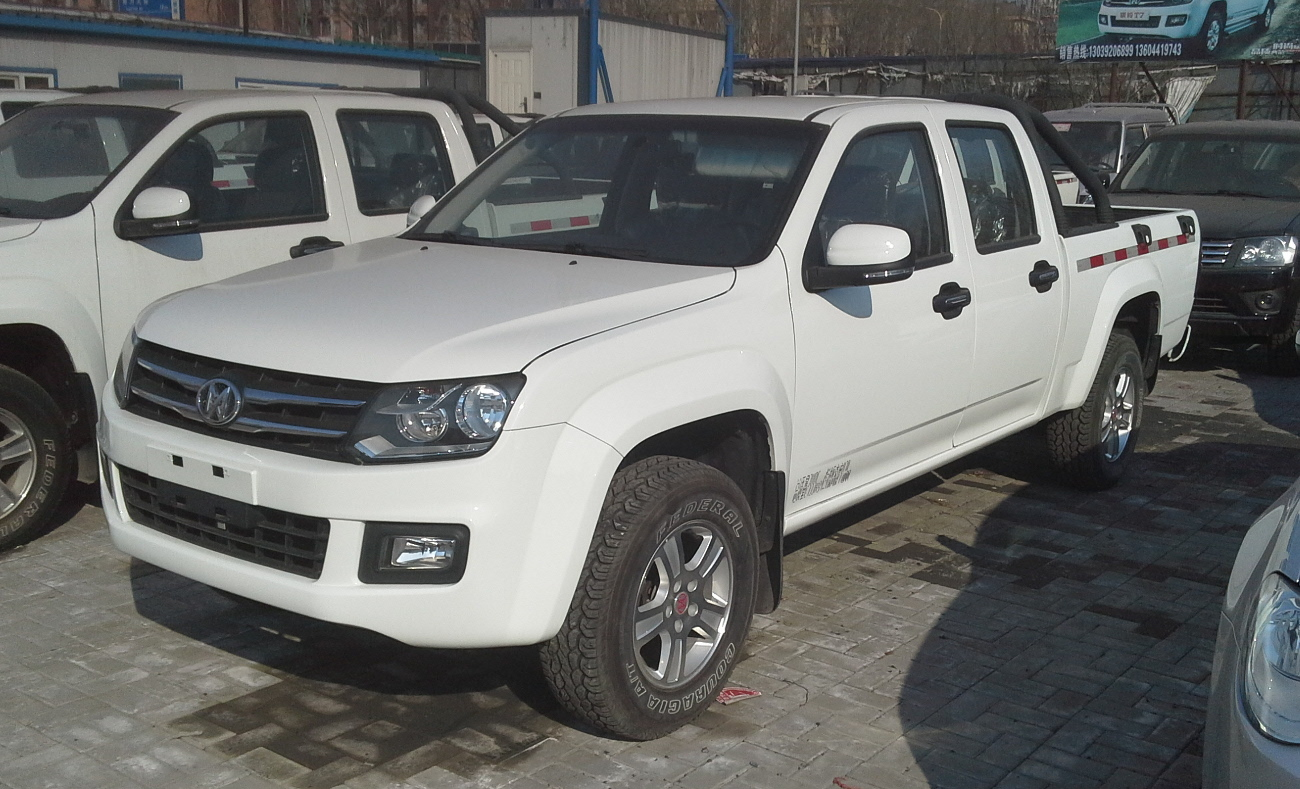
Qiling T7

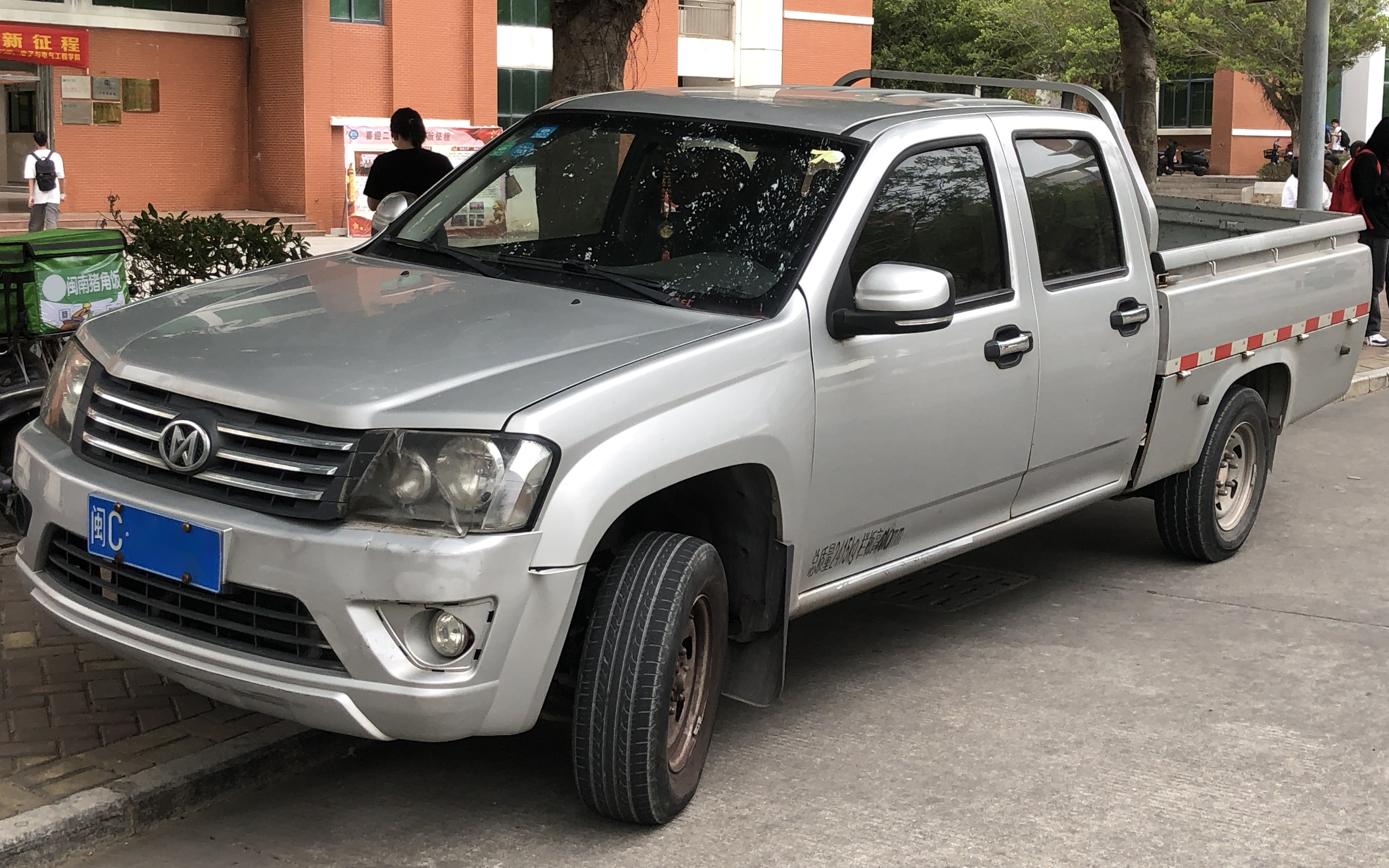
Qiling T100

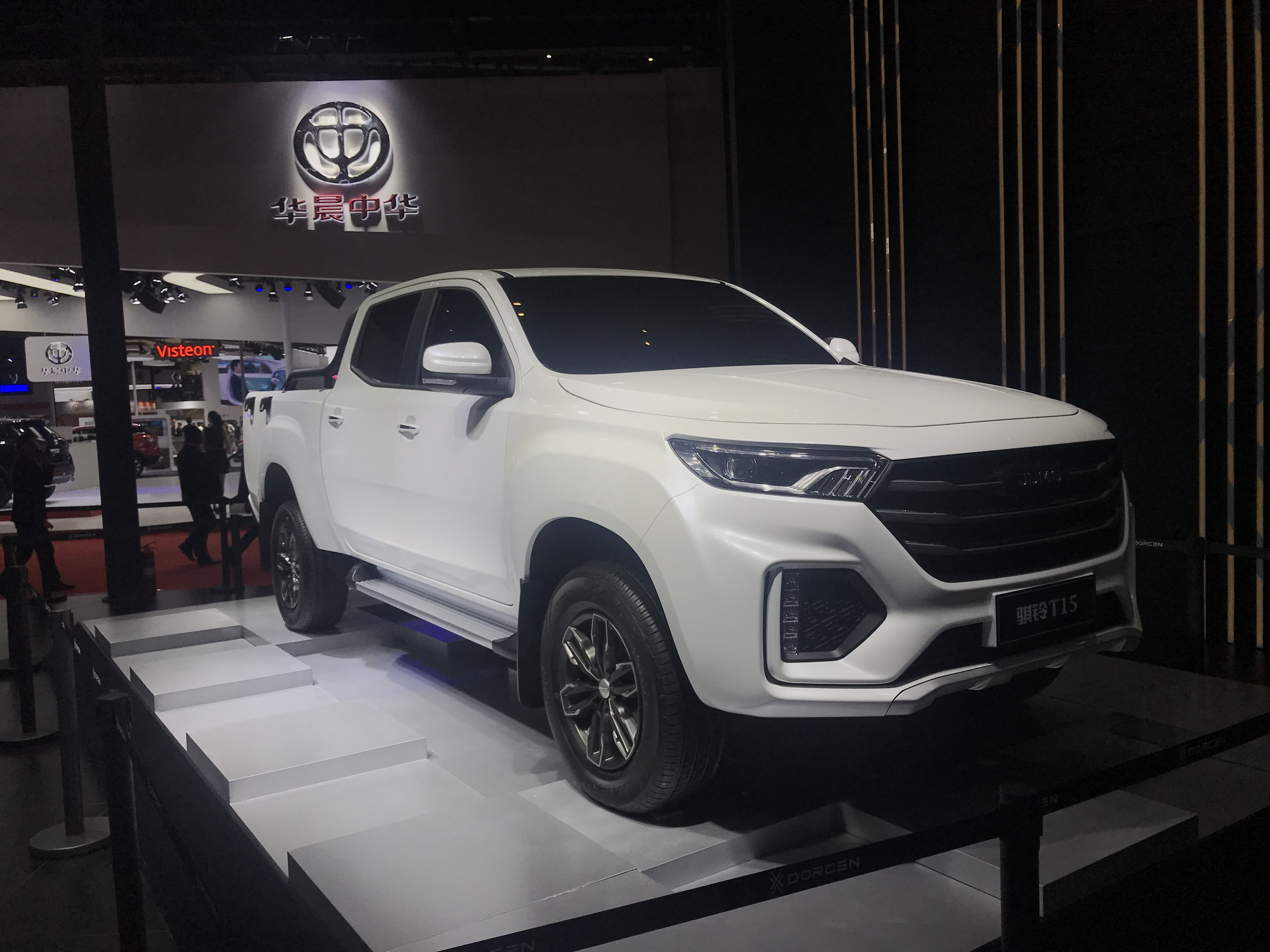
Qiling T15
