= Niutron NV =

Chinese electric mid-size SUV

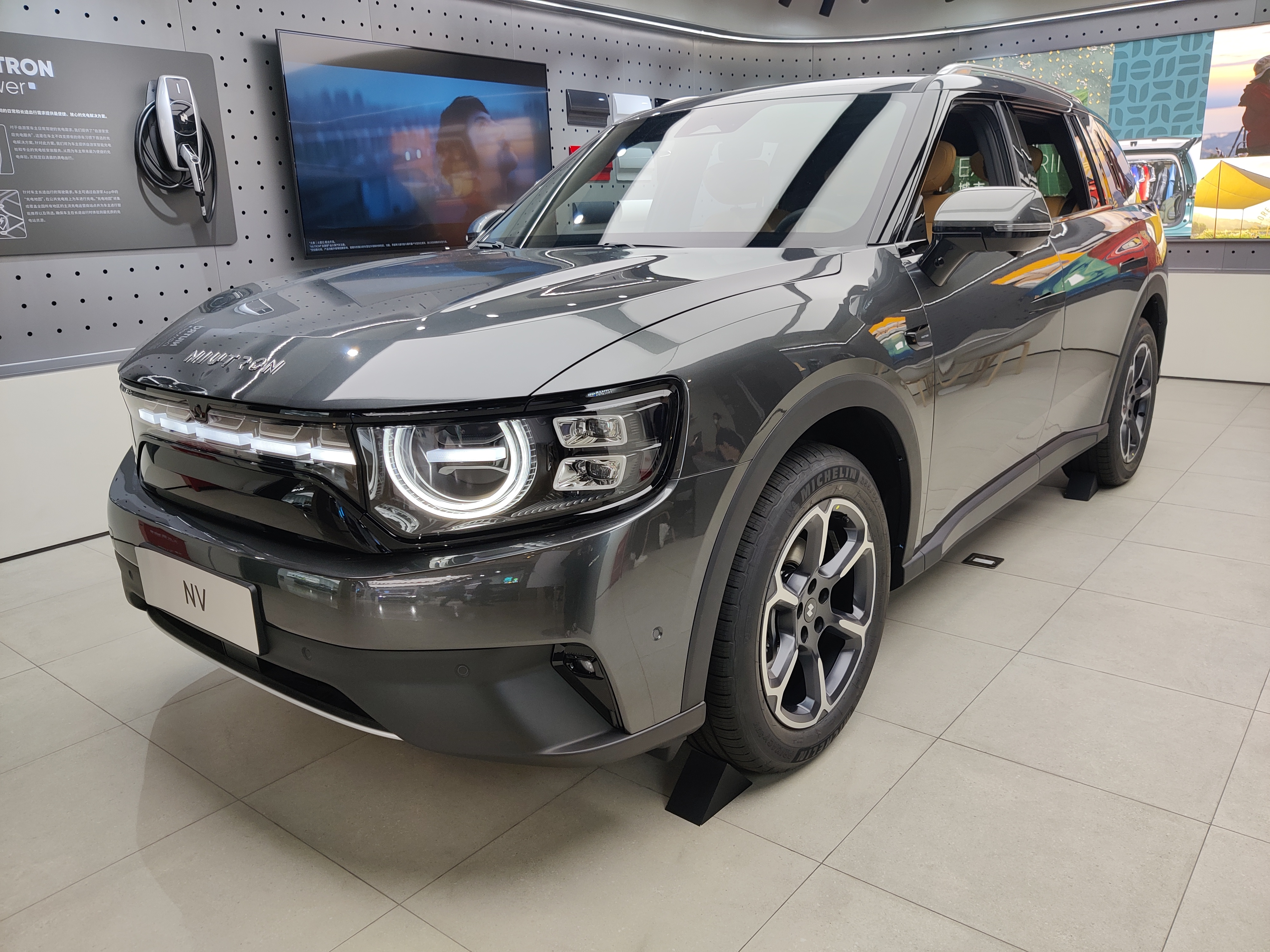

Overview
- Manufacturer: Niutron
- Also called: Docan V07
- Production: 2022 (attempted)
- Assembly: China: Changzhou, Jiangsu

Body and chassis
- Class: Mid-size SUV
- Body style: 5-door SUV
- Layout: Dual-motor, all-wheel-drive (EV); Front-engine, dual-motor, all-wheel-drive (EREV)
- Platform: Gemini

Powertrain
- Engine: 1.5 L Changan Blue core Turbo I4 (Generator)
- Electric motor: 2× permanent magnet synchronous
- Power output: 110 kW (150 hp; 150 PS) (Engine); 280 kW (380 hp; 380 PS) (EV); 270 kW (360 hp; 370 PS) (EREV)
- Transmission: Single-speed gear reduction
- Hybrid drivetrain: Plug-in Series-Hybrid (EREV)
- Battery: EV: 65 kWh LFP SVOLT; 83 kWh NMC Sunwoda; EREV: 31 kWh SVOLT LFP
- Range: 939 km (583 mi) (WLTP); 1,257 km (781 mi) (CLTC)
- Electric range: EV: 440–560 km (270–350 mi) (CLTC); REEV: 150 km (93 mi) (WLTP)
- Plug-in charging: V2L: 6kW

Dimensions
- Wheelbase: 2,910 mm (114.6 in)
- Length: 4,915 mm (193.5 in)
- Width: 1,962 mm (77.2 in)
- Height: 1,745 mm (68.7 in)
- Curb weight: 2,220 kg (4,894 lb)

The Niutron NV is a battery electric and range-extended mid-size SUV that Chinese electric vehicle manufacturer Niutron (Mandarin: 自游家) attempted to produce in 2022, although the production was ultimately unsuccessful. It would later be rebranded as the Docan V07 by vehicle manufacturer Docan (大乘) starting in 2023, without success again.

== Overview ==
The Niutron company and pictures of its first production model, the NV, were first announced on December 15, 2021. The production version of the NV along with detailed specifications and pricing was revealed in March 2022, with pre-orders starting on March 31st and deliveries arriving in September of that year. Base prices started at CN¥ 278,000. Manufacturing was scheduled to begin in September 2022 at Dorcen's Changzhou production facility.

However, in the wake of Dorcen's 2020 bankruptcy, the Changzhou factory's manufacturing permit had expired and needed to undergo a lengthy recertification process. In the face of this delay, on December 7th, 2022 Niutron refunded all 24,376 pre-order deposits along with a CN¥ 200 Starbucks gift card in an apology letter to customers, stating that they were not able to achieve their promise to deliver vehicles in a timely manner. Also in the apology statement, Niutron stated "a beautiful journey will come to an end before it begins" and simultaneously closed its online shop.

In June 2023, the vehicle reappeared, and was rebadged as the Docan V07. Dorcen, which is the former anglicized name of 大乘 (Dacheng), was rebranded to Docan after its 2020 bankruptcy.

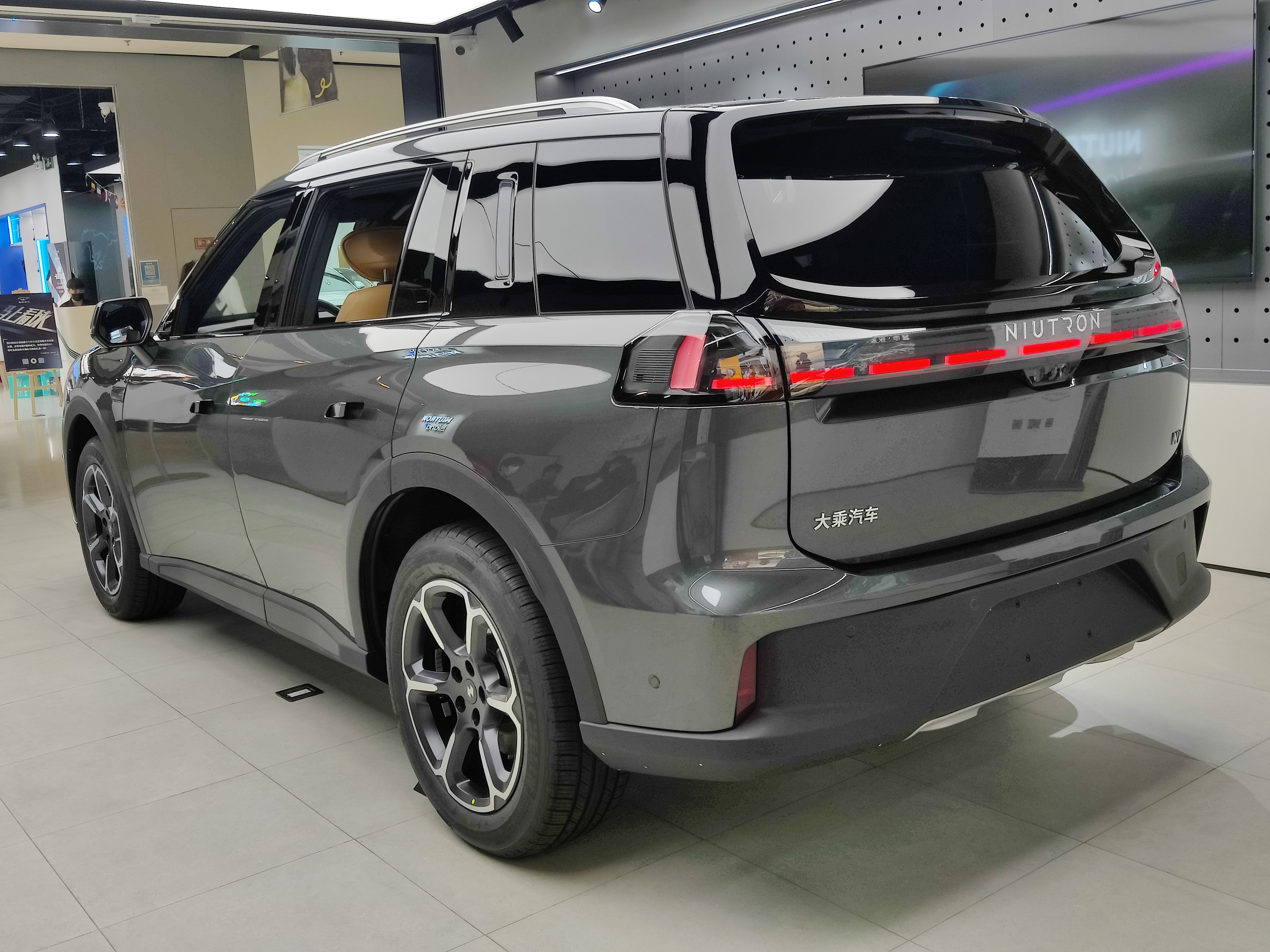
Rear view

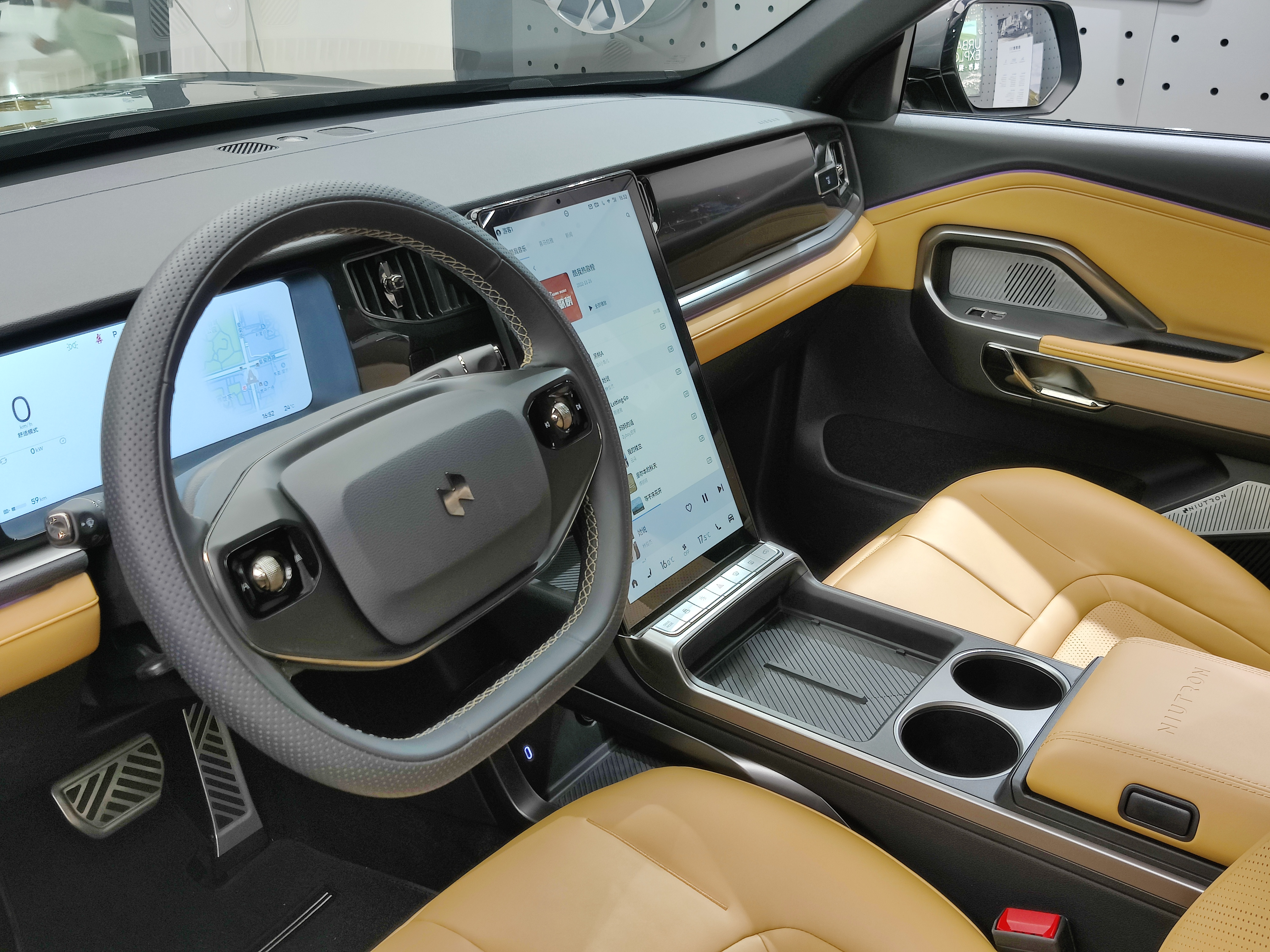
Interior

=== Design ===
The NV was designed on a platform Niutron calls Gemini, which was designed to accommodate both BEV and REEV powertrains.

The NV comes standard with several advanced driving assistance systems, including adaptive cruise control with traffic jam assist and hands-free lane centering and lane changes, blind spot monitoring, front and rear collision warning including pedestrians and cross traffic alert all with automatic emergency braking, and automatic parking system. Also included are features such as traffic sign recognition, 360-degree camera around view monitor, door opening warning, and automatic parking brake.

The NV's relatively boxy shape affords it a large trunk capacity of 788 liters (208 U.S. gal). The NV's suspension consists of a MacPherson strut for the front axle and a multi-link independent rear suspension, with 200 mm (7.9 in) of ground clearance, a fording depth nearly 500 mm (20 in), and approach and departure angles of 18 and 23 degrees respectively. The NV has 20-inch wheels, with 255/55R20 Michelin Primacy SUV tires. It is equipped with ventilated disc brakes on both the front and rear axles, and has an electronic parking brake. The engine in the range extender model is mounted in a transverse configuration.

The NV is equipped with V2L capabilities with a 220V plug that is able to output 3.3 kW in standard mode, or up to 6 kW in 'rescue' mode.

=== Exterior ===
The NV's styling is closer to that of a conventional crossover SUV than most of its competitors in the Chinese NEV market, which tend to have more futuristic styling. It features LED projector headlights, while the daytime running lights consist of LED light strips circling the headlights which are intersected by a 'dashed' line light bar. The upper grille section underneath the light bar is open on REEV models to provide an air supply to the engine, and is blocked off in BEV models. The lower bumper is black plastic and contains small LED indented fog lights flanking the lower grille opening, and has a metal skid plate design on the bottom.

The C-pillar of the NV houses a unique feature which Niutron calls the 'energy stack', which is a vertical LED light strip that acts as a battery charge meter for viewing from afar. The car has a floating roof design, can optionally be painted in contrasting black with matching gloss black roof rails. The C-pillar can either be black or chrome, with the 'energy stack' coming in black, white or silver. The door handles are flush with the body and pop out at an angle when the doors are unlocked. The rear taillights mirror the DRLs at the front, with a full length dashed LED strip design with a subtle protruding fin shape at the ends. The rear upper and side spoilers form a continuous shape around the rear window. The rearview camera is located just below the taillights, while the license plate is located in the lower bumper.

=== Interior ===
The dashboard of the NV is a minimalist, primarily straight horizontal design with a flush digital instrument cluster, and is bisected by the center console. The rest of the dashboard is finished with a glossy piano black panel with the air vents placed in within beveled insets. The vents have metallic surrounds, and are controlled by a single metallic finished knob to adjust the direction and flow of air, along with capacitive touch buttons controlling vent zones. The digital instrument cluster is a 12.3-inch display with a simple or detailed UI mode. The infotainment system is a 15.6-inch vertically oriented touchscreen with haptic feedback placed in the center console and contains the digital HVAC controls. Below the infotainment screen is a row of physical buttons for frequently accessed controls, below which two wireless charging pads reside. The lower dashboard is finished with contrasting Nappa leather and is separated by an ambient lighting strip, and the top is covered with soft touch material. The steering wheel is a two-spoke design with a flat bottom, with two control pads on each side.

Both rows come standard with heated and ventilated Nappa leather seats. The front row seats also have a massage function and can recline at up to 167 degrees with an extending leg rest. The rear seats have access to another screen for climate controls. The roof features a dual pane fixed panoramic sunroof.

== Powertrain ==
At the Niutron NV's initial announcement in March 2022, Niutron stated it planned to produce both fully electric and range extender versions of the NV. As of June 2023, only the BEV version has entered production as the Docan V07, despite near finalized pre-production REEV models having been available for automotive press to test drive alongside BEV models in late August 2022.

The BEV model makes 280 kW (380 hp) of power and 452 N⋅m (333 lb⋅ft) of torque combined from two identical 140 kW (188 hp) electric motors powering each axle, manufactured by Wuxi-CRRC-hofer Powertrain. Energy is provided by a choice of either a lithium iron phosphate pack manufactured by SVOLT or a NMC battery pack from Sunwoda, with capacity of either pack unclaimed. Range is a claimed 440–560 km (270–350 mi) on the CLTC cycle. The NV has a 0-100 km/h (62 mph) time of 5.9 seconds, and a top speed of 170 km/h (110 mph).

The range extender model outputs a total of 270 kW (362 hp) and 526 N⋅m (388 lb⋅ft) of torque from two permanent magnet synchronous motors, with the front motor rated at 130 kW (170 hp) and the rear at 140 kW (190 hp). The range extender engine is an all aluminum turbocharged direct-injected DOHC 1.5 L 4-cylinder with a claimed 41% peak thermal efficiency. Pure electric range is 150 km (93 mi) on the WLTP, and total range is 1,257 km (781 mi) on the CLTC, or 939 km (583 mi) on the WLTP test cycle.
