= Dorcen G70S =

Chinese mid-size SUV

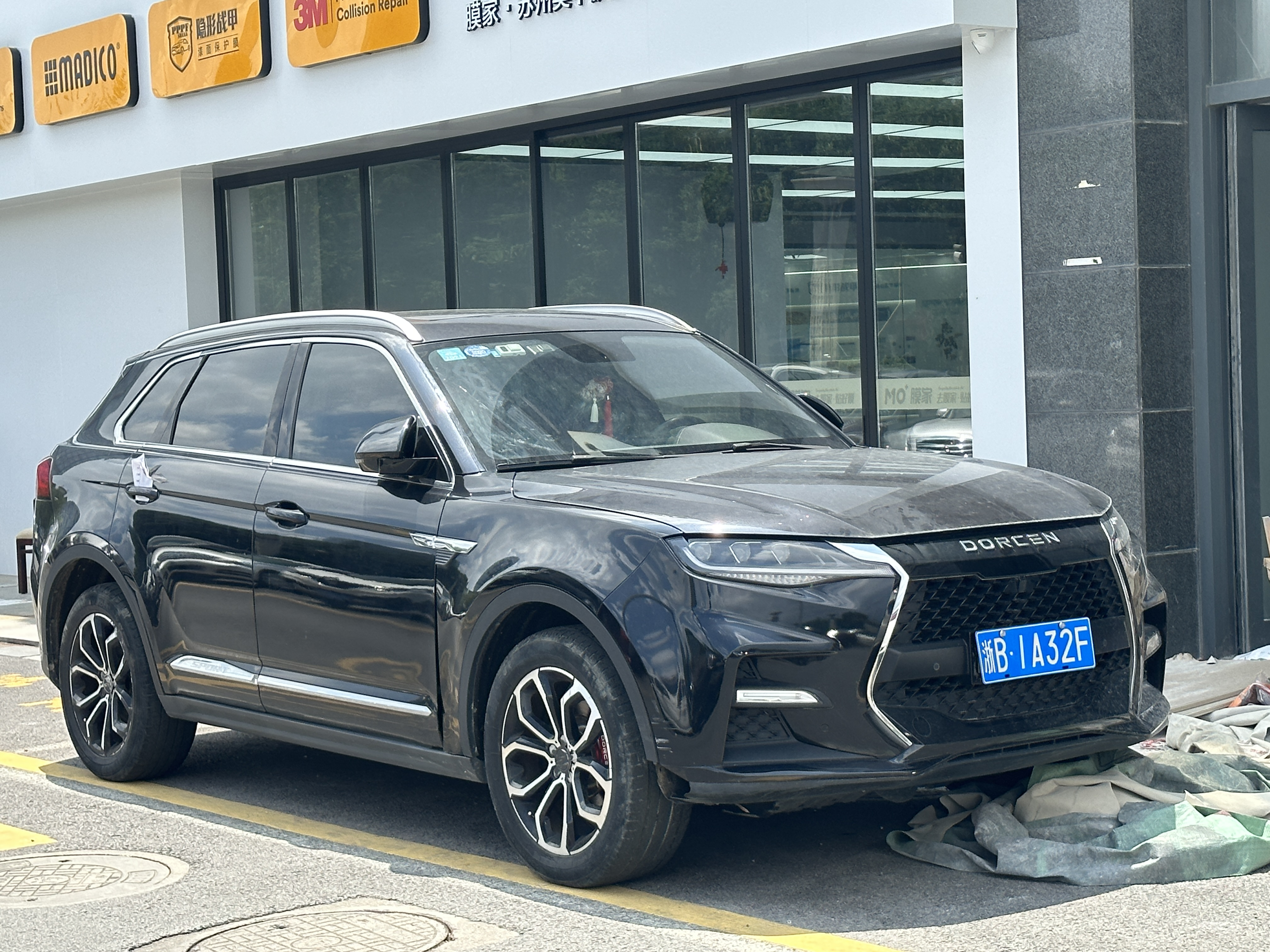

Overview
- Manufacturer: Dorcen
- Production: 2018–2021
- Assembly: China
- Designer: Guozhu Zhang, Pininfarina

Body and chassis
- Class: Mid-size crossover SUV
- Body style: 5-door SUV
- Layout: Front-engine, front-wheel drive
- Related: Zotye Domy X7

Powertrain
- Engine: Petrol: 2.0 L 4G63S4T I4 turbo
- Transmission: 8-speed automatic

Dimensions
- Wheelbase: 2,850 mm (112.2 in)
- Length: 4,764 mm (187.6 in)
- Width: 1,942 mm (76.5 in)
- Height: 1,672 mm (65.8 in)

The Dorcen G70S is a mid-size crossover SUV manufactured by Chinese automaker Dorcen.

== Overview ==
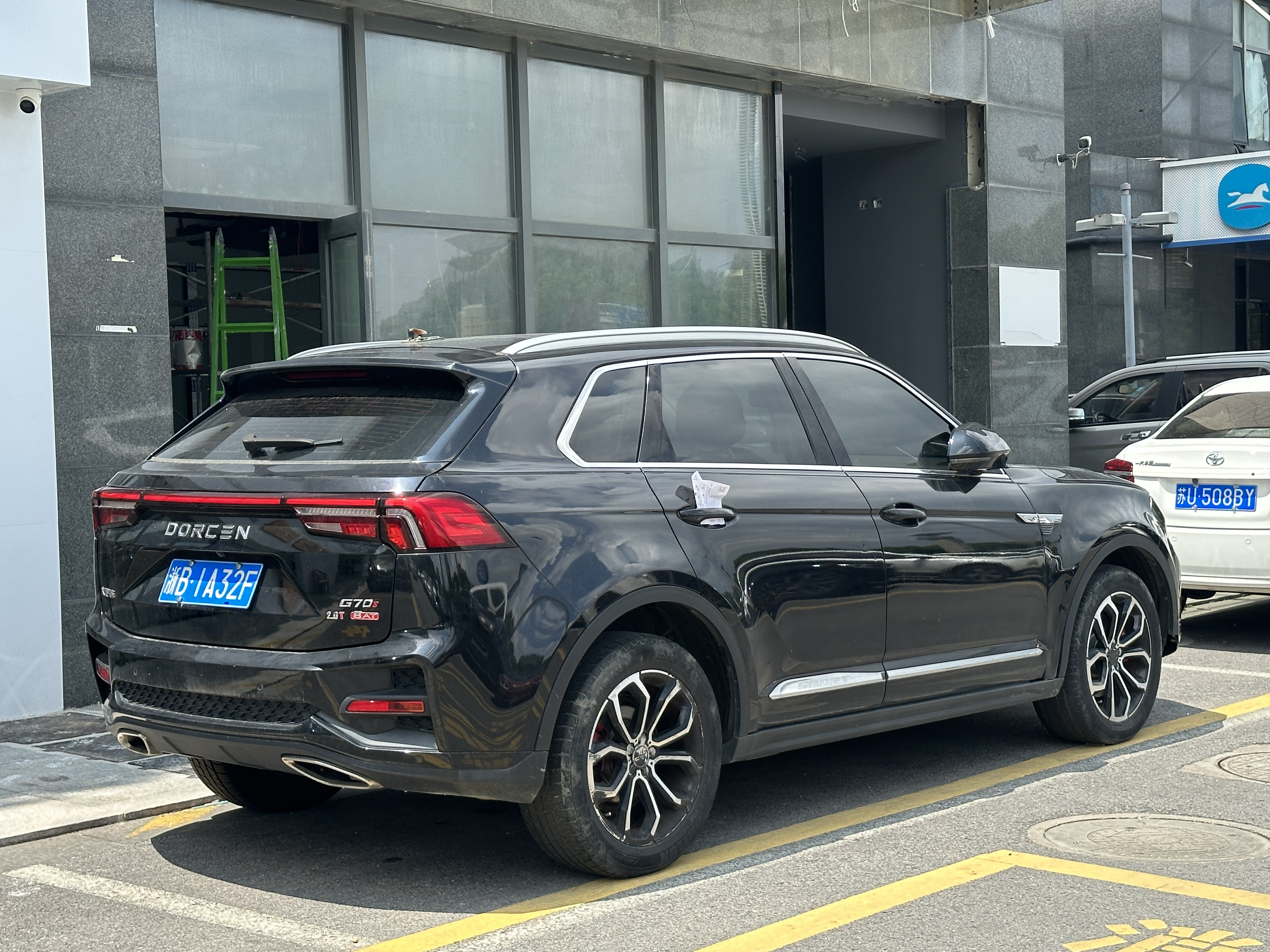
Dorcen G70S rear

Revealed in September 2018 in China, prices of the Dorcen G70S ranges from 119,900 yuan to 149,900 yuan. The power comes from a 2.0 liter Inline-4 turbo engine code named 4G63S4T provided by Shenyang-Mitsubishi. The 2.0 liter Inline-4 turbo engine is mated to s 8-speed automatic gearbox producing 177hp and 250Nm of torque.

== Design ==
Based on the Zotye Domy X7, the design was originally previewed as the Domy X7 S, a sportier trim of the Zotye Domy X7 mid-size crossover SUV in November 2017. The Domy X7 S features a restyled front fascia and a redesigned tailgate. As of 2018, the model was canceled and the design and platform was sold to Dorcen and renamed to Dorcen G70s.

== See also ==
- Domy X7 the car that the Dorcen G70S was based on
