= Zotye Domy X7 =

Domy X7
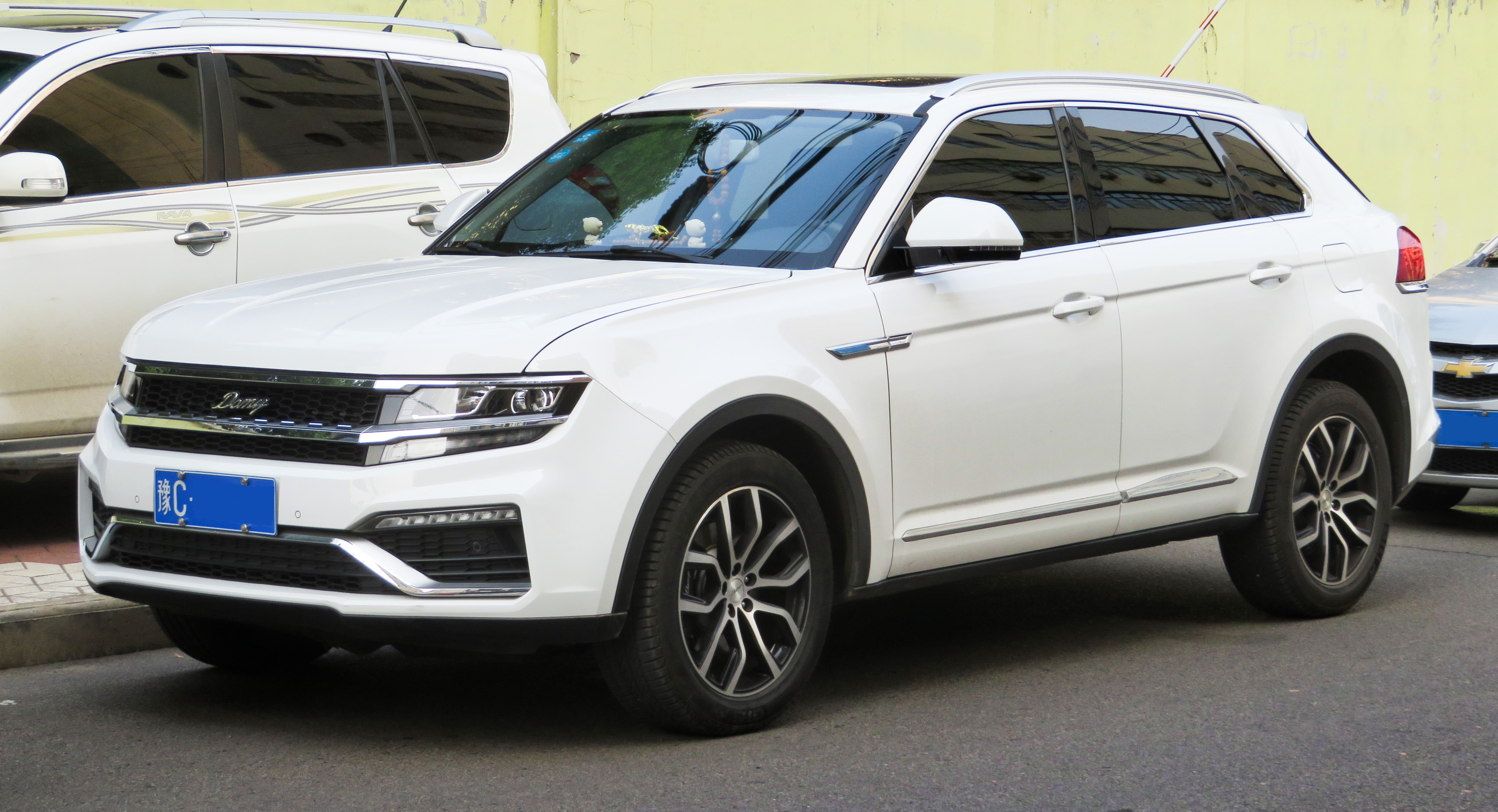

Overview
- Manufacturer: Zotye Auto
- Production: 2016–2021
- Assembly: China

Body and chassis
- Class: Mid-size crossover SUV
- Body style: 5-door SUV
- Layout: Front-engine, front-wheel drive
- Related: Dorcen G70s

Powertrain
- Engine: Petrol: 1.5 L turbo I4; 1.8 L turbo I4; 2.0 L turbo I4
- Transmission: 5-speed manual; 6-speed DCT

Dimensions
- Wheelbase: 2,850 mm (112.2 in)
- Length: 4,736 mm (186.5 in)
- Width: 1,942 mm (76.5 in)
- Height: 1,672 mm (65.8 in)

The Zotye Domy X7 (Damai X7) is a mid-size crossover SUV manufactured by Chinese automaker Zotye Auto under the Domy (大迈) product series.

== Overview ==
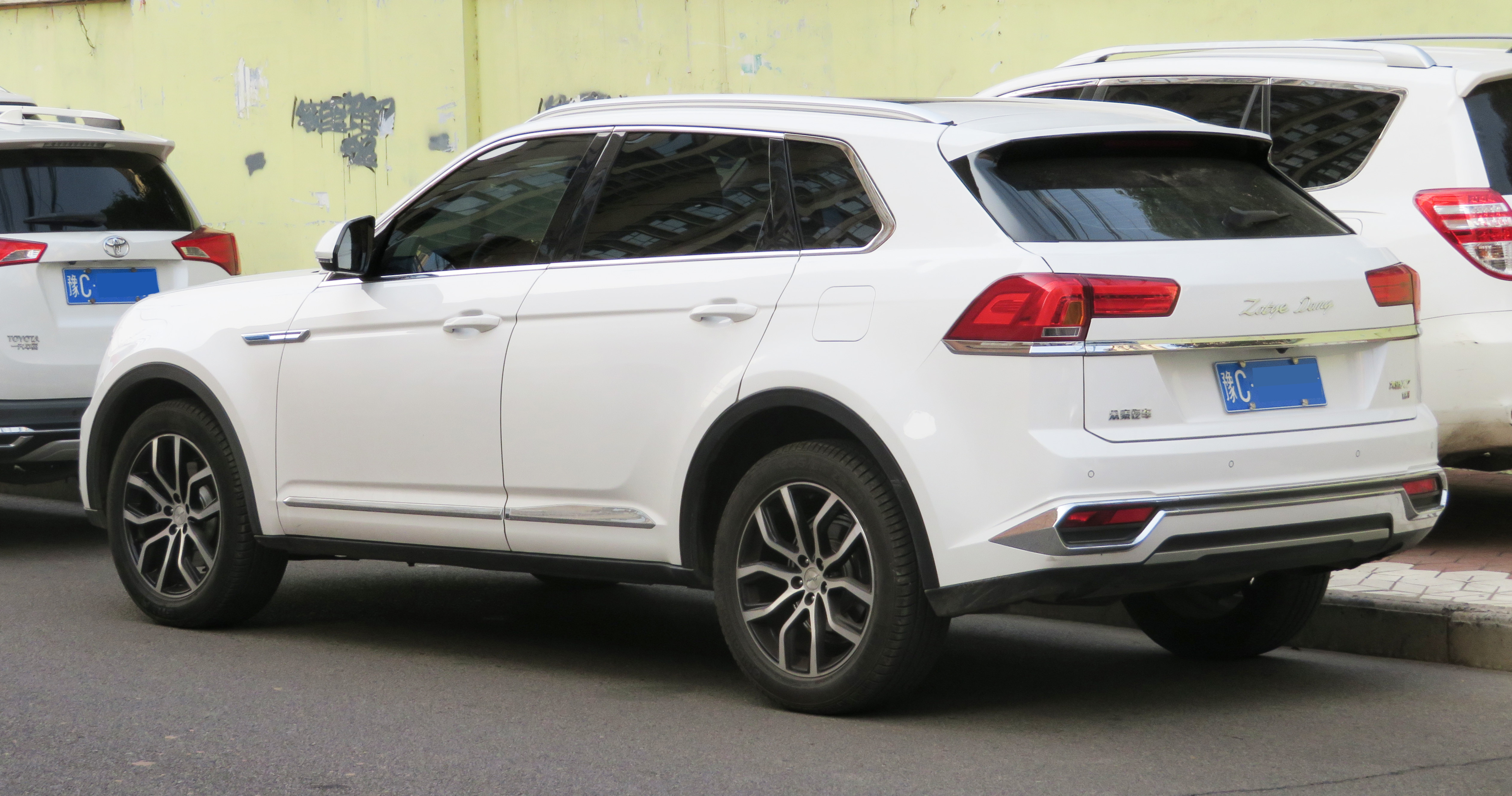
Rear view

Revealed during the 2016 Chengdu Auto Show in China, the production version was launched later in October 2016 with prices ranging from 89,900 yuan to 161,900 yuan. Its styling is controversial as the Domy X7 heavily resembles the Volkswagen Tiguan.

== Zotye Domy X7 S ==
The Domy X7 S is a sportier trim of the Zotye Domy X7 SUV which is revealed in November 2017. The Domy X7 S features a restyled front fascia and a redesigned tailgate. As of 2018, the model was canceled and the design and platform were sold to Dorcen and renamed to Dorcen G70s.

== See also ==
- Volkswagen Tiguan MK2: The car that inspired the design of the Domy X7
