= Jiangxi Huaxiang Fuqi Automobile =

Chinese car manufacturer

Fuqi Auto Works or Fuzhou Auto Works Jiangxi Huaxiang Fuqi Automobile Co. Ltd.
- Type: State-owned enterprise
- Industry: Automotive
- Founded: 1969
- Defunct: 2008?
- Headquarters: Fuzhou, China, China
- Area served: Worldwide

Jiangxi Huaxiang Fuqi Automobile Co. Ltd., previously Fuqi Auto Works or Fuzhou Auto Works, was a manufacturer of automobiles from the People's Republic of China.

== History ==
Fuzhou Auto Works from Fuzhou, Jiangxi was originally founded in 1969 as Nanchang automobile factory (南昌汽车厂), the factory was then moved to Fuzhou (抚州) in October 1969 due to the need of manufacturing for the war, and was renamed to Jiangxi Bamianshan Auto Works (江西八面山汽车制造厂). In December 1973, the firm was renamed to Fuzhou Auto Works (抚州汽车厂).

Commercial vehicle production began in the 1970s, with the first products being unlicensed and reverse engineered vehicles resembling the Nangjing Yuejin Jingangshan 27 (南京跃进井冈山27) by Nanjing Automobile, Fiat 6500 trucks, Tatra 138, and Ganjiang 12V (赣江12V) trucks, with 180T diesel engines installed.

In 1979, Fuzhou Auto Works started to produce Beijing 212 off-road vehicles with licensed blueprints, chassis, body, and components. SUV productions followed in the 1980s.

In 1985, Fuzhou Auto Works was renamed to Jiangxi Fuqi Auto Works (江西富奇汽车厂), and acquired production resources of the Beijing 212 and Beijing 213 from BAIC. production of the Beijing 121, Beijing 2022, and Beijing 214 followed.

In 1989, the first passenger vehicle production appeared, under the Fuqi brand. Some vehicles were exported to the United States. Production of the Fuqi Pickup, Fuqi 6480, and Fuqi 6500 SUVs also started.

From 2003 to 2004 there was a cooperation with Hebei's Zhongxing Automobile, followed by the buyout and name change to Jiangxi Huaxiang Fuqi Automobile Co. Ltd, with Ningbo Huaxiang Group taking over the company.

The last saved version of the company's website is from 2008. The company website is no longer available after 2008.

Jiangling Motors Corporation Group reorganised Jiangxi Huaxiang Fuqi Automobile and established JMCG Light Vehicle Co., Ltd. or Jiangling Group Light Truck (JMCGL) in early 2013 as a Fuzhou-based pickup truck and minivan manufacturer. Fuzhou is one of the six major vehicle manufacturing bases of JMCG outside Nanchang (the others being Qingyun, Xiaolan, Changbei, Wangcheng and Taiyuan).

== Vehicles ==
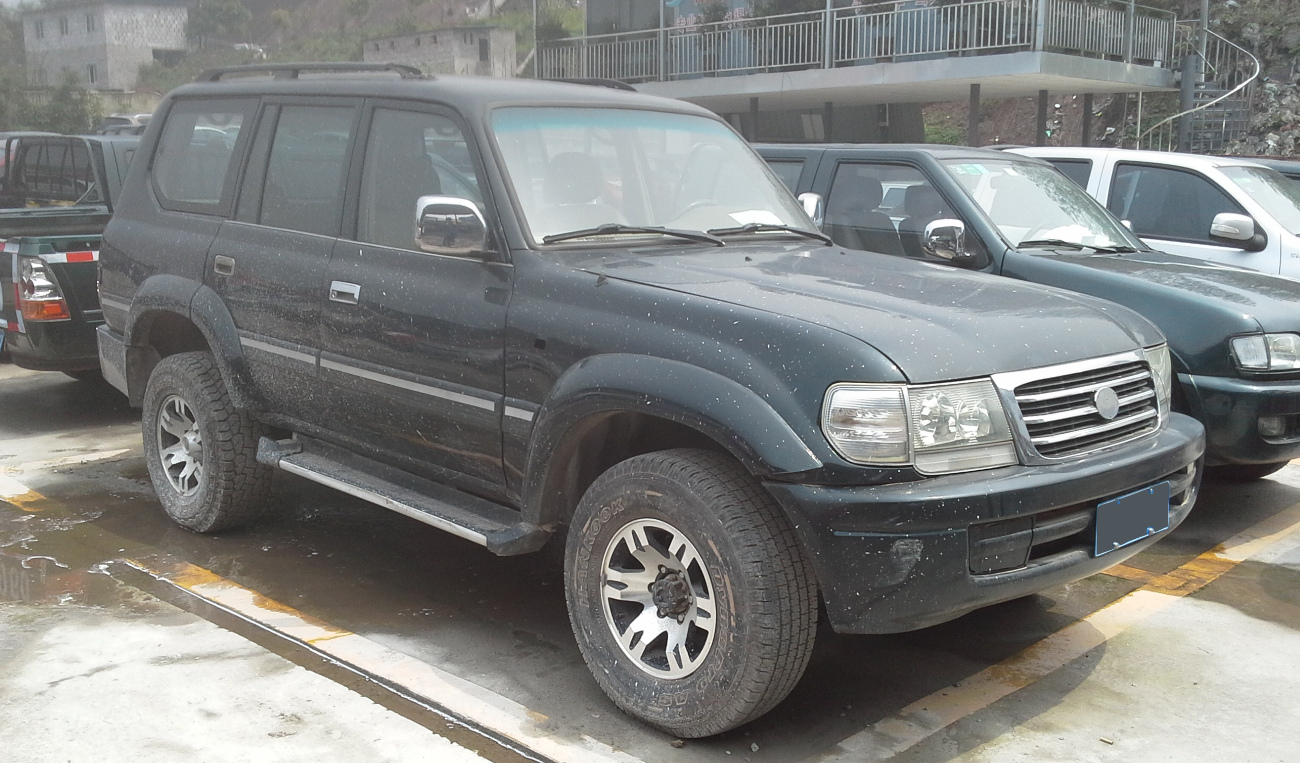
Huaxiang Fuqi Yuhu

The first 1980s SUV productions were modifications of the Beijing BJ212.

In 1989, a passenger vehicle called the FQ6400 appeared. The FQ6400 was available both as a four-door sedan and as a hatchback with a large tailgate. The bodies were made of plastic and heavily resemble the Daihatsu Charade.

The Huaxiang Fuqi Yuhu FQ6480 was introduced in 1999 and heavily resemble the Toyota Land Cruiser. Another source states that the vehicle was a licensed production. Later in 2002, the successor called the FQ6500 started production which heavily resembles the Toyota Prado.

== Car Production ==
Year	Production	Quote
2000	2663	
2001	811	
2002	845	
2003	1576	
2004	1594	
2005	1178	
2006	651	
2007	1006	

Additionally, 1328 pick-ups for 2003 and 2846 for the following year have survived.
