= Jiangling Motors Corporation Group =

Chinese automotive holding company

Jiangling Motors Corporation Group Co., Ltd.
- Formerly: Jiangxi Automotive Maintenance Plant; Jiangxi Automotive Repair Plant; Jiangxi Automotive Manufacturing Plant
- Type: State-owned enterprise
- Industry: Automotive
- Founded: 8 April 1947; 79 years ago
- Headquarters: Nanchang, Jiangxi, China
- Area served: Worldwide
- Key people: Qui Tiangao (Secretary of the party committee and chairman); Wan Jianrong (General manager)
- Revenue: ▲CN¥95.34 billion (2020)
- Net income: ▼CN¥0.83 billion (2020)
- Total assets: ▲CN¥92.67 billion (2020)
- Owner: Nanchang State-owned Assets Supervision and Administration Committee

Chinese name
- Simplified Chinese: 江铃汽车集团有限公司
- Traditional Chinese: 江鈴汽車集團有限公司
Transcriptions
Standard Mandarin
- Hanyu Pinyin: Jiānglíng Qìchē Jítuán Yǒuxiàn Gōngsī
Yue: Cantonese
- Jyutping: gong1ling4 hei3ce1 zaap6tyun4 jau5haan6 gung1si1

Jiangling Group (JMCG)
- Simplified Chinese: 江铃集团
- Traditional Chinese: 江鈴集團
Transcriptions
Standard Mandarin
- Hanyu Pinyin: Jiānglíng Jítuán
- IPA: [tɕjáŋlǐŋ tɕǐtʰwǎn]
Gan
- Romanization: Kongliang Sitthon
Yue: Cantonese
- Jyutping: gong1ling4 zaap6tyun4
- Website: www.jmcg.com.cn www.jmcg-global.com

Jiangling Motors Corporation Group Co., Ltd. (JMCG) is a Chinese state-owned holding mostly operating in the automotive industry. It was established in 1947 and is headquartered in Nanchang, Jiangxi.

JMCG has various production facilities and, through shareholdings, maintains partnerships with other automotive manufacturers including Ford, Isuzu and Changan.

== History ==
On 8 April 1947, JMCG was established as Nanchang Automotive Maintenance Plant. In April 1949, Nanchang Automotive Maintenance Plant was renamed as Nanchang Automotive Repairing Plant. In May 1958, it produced Yingxiong-bagded (Chinese: 英雄; pinyin: Yīngxióng; lit. 'Hero') three-wheeled vehicles. In the same year, it produced a 2.5-tonne Yingxiong truck. In 1968, it was renamed Jiangxi Automotive Manufacturing Plant and started the mass-production of commercial vehicles, mostly Jinggangshan-badged (Chinese: 井冈山; pinyin: Jǐnggāngshān; lit. 'Well Ridge Mountains') light trucks using 1940s Soviet technology. In 1969, it also produced a small number of cars. The company focused production on commercial vehicles, although it had a net financial loss until the 1980s.

As the Chinese economy opened up, Jiangxi Automotive Manufacturing Plant found increasingly difficult to compete with more modern, better-quality foreign products. The manufacturing plant had to cut its prices to keep on selling, worsening its financial situation. By 1983, the company had an accumulated loss of CN¥56 million while the total value of its assets was less than CN¥10 million. That year, Sun Min became the company chief and started a turnaround plan focused on increasing efficiency and streamlining operations. In 1984, after improving the Jinggangshan trucks and increasing sales volume, the company posted its first profit in sixteen years. During the 1980s the company also began a partnership with Isuzu of Japan to produce light and medium trucks. From 1989 to 1992, Jiangxi Automotive Manufacturing Plant merged and reorganised Jiangxi Trailer Plant, Nanchang Sewing Machine Plant, Jiangxi Washing Machine Plant, Jiangxi Steel Window Plant, Fuzhou Chassis Plant and Zhangzhou Gearbox Plant and other companies. Jiangling Motors Corporation Group was formally established in 1991. In 1993, the company structure was reorganised and simplified and its truck business was spun off and listed on the Shenzhen Stock Exchange as Jiangling Motors Corporation (JMC). Ford Motor Company became a partner of JMCG by acquiring a significant stake in JMC.

Failed Algerian project

By 2007, JMCG had a strong presence in the Algerian market through JMC products, with a third of the automotive sales in the country. JMCG partnered with Zhongding (Pingxiang Coal Group), another Nanchang company, and bidded for an Algerian special economic zone. The zone was approved and received the name Algeria-China Jiangling Free Trade Zone. The aim of the zone was to attract Jiangxi companies centred on the automotive and construction materials industries. The zone was never completed as the Algerian government enacted laws forcing majority stakes for the local companies participating in special economic zones and incentivating full vehicle manufacturing instead of only final assembly as intended by the Chinese. The Algerian government also wanted Algerian subcontractors on the project, while the Chinese companies preferred Chinese ones.

== Company ownership and structure ==
From its establishment onwards, JMCG has been a wholly state-owned enterprise (SOE) controlled by Nanchang's municipal planning. Until 1993, JMCG's assets were owned directly by the state. That year, it was incorporated as a limited company, although still state-owned. In September 2019, Jiangxi's State-owned Assets Supervision and Administration Committee announced it had included JMCG in a list of SOEs incorporating investors from the private sector by 2021, as part of mixed economy reforms.

== Joint ventures ==
=== Jiangling Motor Holding and Jiangling Investment ===
Jiangling Motor Holding Co. Ltd. or JMH (Chinese: 江西江铃控股有限公司; pinyin: Jiāngxī Jiānglíng Kònggǔ Yǒuxiàn Gōngsī) was a joint venture established in October 2004 and controlled equally by the state-owned enterprises Changan and JMCG. To create Jiangling Motor Holding, Changan invested money and in exchange JMCG transferred its JMC equity to the venture. Jiangling Motor Holding was the largest shareholder of JMC, with a 41.03% stake as of March 2018. JMH also owned the Landwind marque.

In April 2019, it was announced that JMCG and Changan planned to split JMH into two separate companies: one keeping the same name and other tentatively called Jiangling Investment. Jiangling Investment would hold the 41.03% JMC stake and some liabilities and would still be equally owned by Changan and JMCG. The new JMH would own the rest of the former JMH assets (including Landwind) and it would issue 100% more shares to be sold to investors, leaving JMCG and Changan with a 25% stake each. Jiangling Investment was formally established in May 2019, completing the split of the former JMH. In June 2019, it was announced that the investor for the new JMH was the car manufacturer Aiways. Aiways acquired a 50% of the new JMH with the aim of securing production permits for new energy vehicles.

=== Jiangxi Isuzu ===
Jiangxi Isuzu Motors Co., Ltd. (JIM) is a Nanchang-based joint venture between Isuzu and JMCG established in 1983. Isuzu N-series trucks were manufactured from 1985 onwards by Jiangxi Automotive Manufacturing Plant. In 1993, shortly before JMC were spun off, Jiangxi Automobile Manufacturing Co., Ltd. (a JMCG subsidiary), Itochu Trading and Isuzu created the Jiangling Isuzu joint venture to continue producing Isuzu-badged trucks for 20 years. JMCG owned a 75% stake and the rest was evenly distributed between Isuzu and Itochu. JMCG and Isuzu restructured their agreement in 2012, and the equally-owned Jiangxi Isuzu took charge of Isuzu production in April 2013.

=== JMEV ===
JMEV is a joint venture between JMCG and Renault. It was established in 2015 as a JMCG electric vehicle subsidiary aimed at supplying smaller cities on China's inland. It became a joint venture in July 2019 after Renault acquired a 50% majority stake through capital increase.

== Subsidiaries and minor joint ventures ==
JMCG Subsidiaries and Affiliations as of 2019

=== Active ===
Jingma Motor Co., Ltd, JMCG (Chinese: 江铃集团晶马汽车有限公司; pinyin: Jiānglíng Jítuán Jīngmǎ Qìchē Yǒuxiàn Gōngsī), also known as JMMC, is a Nanchang-based company focused on developing and producing firefighting vehicles, light-duty SUVs and buses. The company was founded in 1958 as Jiangxi Firefighting Vehicle Manufacturing Factory (also known as Nanchang Automobile Factory). In November 2011, the company was acquired by JMCG and adopted its present name. In February 2013, JMCG integrated the business of Nanchang JMC New Power Vehicle Manufacturing Co., Ltd. into JMMC, to consolidate the production of new energy vehicle buses. JMMC can produce up to 6,000 vehicles per year.

Getrag (Jiangxi) Transmission Co., Ltd, is a Nanchang-based joint venture between Getrag and JMCG, established in January 2007.

Jiangxi Mingfang Auto Parts Industrial Co., Ltd. a joint venture between JMCG and Taiwanese auto parts manufacturer Hsin Chong Group to build an auto parts plant in Yingtan. The plant was put into production in June 2019, and it is initially focused on supplying door and sunroof parts for Jiangxi Isuzu and JMEV vehicles.

Jiangling Motors Group Finance Co., Ltd. (Chinese: 江铃汽车集团财务有限公司; pinyin: Jiānglíng Qìchē Jítuán Cáiwù Yǒuxiàn Gōngsī) is a JMCG subsidiary created in 1993 to provide financial services for JMCG partners and affiliates.

Jiangxi Jiangling Motors Import and Export Co., Ltd. or JMIE (Chinese: 江西江铃进出口有限责任公司; pinyin: Jiāngxī Jiānglíng Jìn Chūkǒu Yǒuxiàn Zérèn Gōngsī) is a trading company owned by JMCG. It exports products from JMCG's partners and affiliates (including JMH, JMC and JIM) and imports products from various companies. The company was established in 1999 and is based in Nanchang. Countries where JMIE is trading include Algeria, South Africa, Saudi Arabia, Nigeria, Angola, Colombia, Cuba, Philippines and Australia.

==== Vehicle conversion ====
JMCG has various affiliates focused on converting vehicles from its partners Ford and Isuzu as well as its affiliates JMC and JMMC into special-purpose ones (such as ambulances and firefighting vehicles). These include:

- Jiangxi Jiangling Special-purpose Vehicle Co., Ltd. or JSVC (Chinese: 江西江铃专用车辆厂有限公司; pinyin: Jiāngxī Jiānglíng Zhuānyòng Chēliàng Chǎng Yǒuxiàn Gōngsī);
- Jiangling Group Special Vehicle Co., Ltd. or JMT (Chinese: 江铃集团特种车专用车有限公司; pinyin: Jiānglíng Jítuán Tèzhǒng Chē Zhuānyòng Chē Yǒuxiàn Gōngsī);
- Jiangxi Jiangling Group Modified Special Vehicle Co., Ltd. or JSV (Chinese: 江西江铃汽车集团改装车股份有限公司; pinyin: Jiāngxī Jiānglíng Qìchē Jítuán Gǎizhuāng Chē Gǔfèn Yǒuxiàn Gōngsī).

JSV was established in 1996 by JMCG as the Jiangling Modification Plant. It adopted its present form in 2006, following a restructuring, and JMCG kept a minority 30% stake while a majority stake was taken by a group of natural persons. Before 2006, JSV focused on converting products from suppliers into construction and cash transport vehicles. After that, it shifted focus to specially-equipped vehicles such as ambulances. In 2019, the company converted 363 vehicles for a revenue of CN¥99.314 million. In July 2020, it announced plans to list stock on the Shenzhen Stock Exchange to finance an expansion of the installed capacity for producing recreational vehicles.

=== Defunct ===
Jiangling Tractor Company (JTC) was JMCG tractor assembling subsidiary. By 2004, it had a plant at Nanchang with the capacity to assemble up to 12,000 units. In 2005, JMCG sold an 80% controlling stake in JTC to Indian Mahindra & Mahindra which renamed it Mahindra (China) Tractor Co., Ltd.

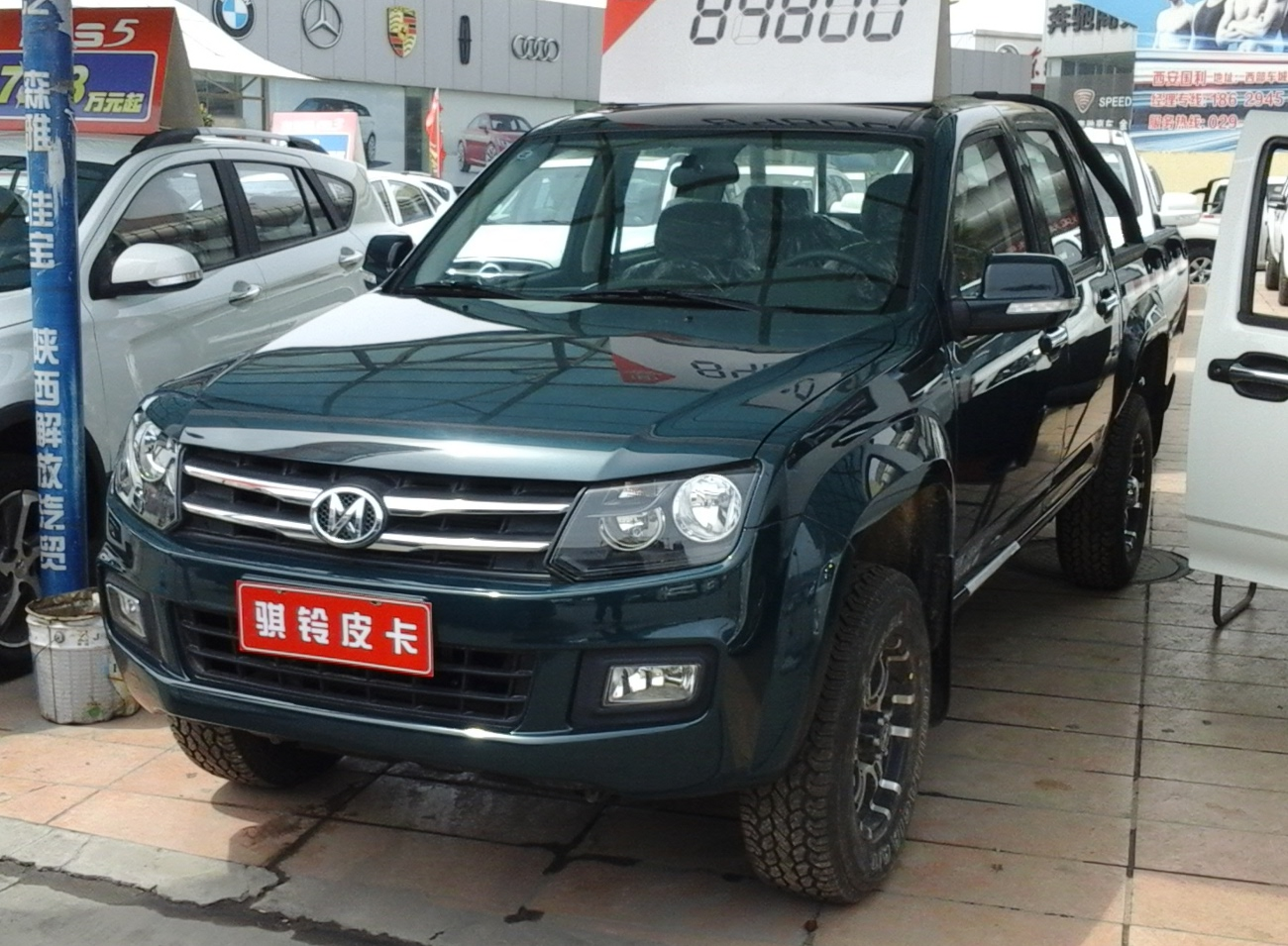
A JMCGL Qiling T7 truck, pictured in 2016

JMCG Light Vehicle Co., Ltd. (Chinese: 江铃集团轻型汽车有限公司; pinyin: Jiānglíng Jítuán Qīngxíng Qìchē Yǒuxiàn Gōngsī), also known as Jiangling Group Light Truck or JMCGL, was a Fuzhou-based pickup truck and minivan manufacturer established in early 2013 by JMCG after reorganising Huaxiang Fuqi. Fuzhou is one of the six major vehicle manufacturing bases of JMCG outside Nanchang (the others being Qingyun, Xiaolan, Changbei, Wangcheng and Taiyuan). The first product from the new company, the Qiling T5 pickup, was launched in September 2014. A second pickup, the T7, was launched in July 2015. In late 2017, JMCGL introduced the Qiling T100.

In January 2018, Jintan Auto Group acquired a 67% majority stake in JMCGL and later renamed it Jiangxi Dancheng (Dorcen) Motor Company. JMCG kept a 19% stake and the rest was taken by Fuzhou High-tech Zone Development Investment Group. The former JMCGL became one of the bases for Jintan Auto's Dorcen marque, which was launched in September 2018. As of 2019, Jiangxi Dorcen still assembles Qiling-badged pickups.

== See also ==
- Citybus (Hong Kong)
