= Niutron =

Chinese electric vehicle company

- Industry: Automotive
- Founded: December 15, 2021; 4 years ago
- Founder: Yan Li
- Defunct: 2023
- Fate: Acquired by Dorcen
- Headquarters: Beijing, China
- Area served: China
- Products: Niutron NV
- Website: www.niutron.com

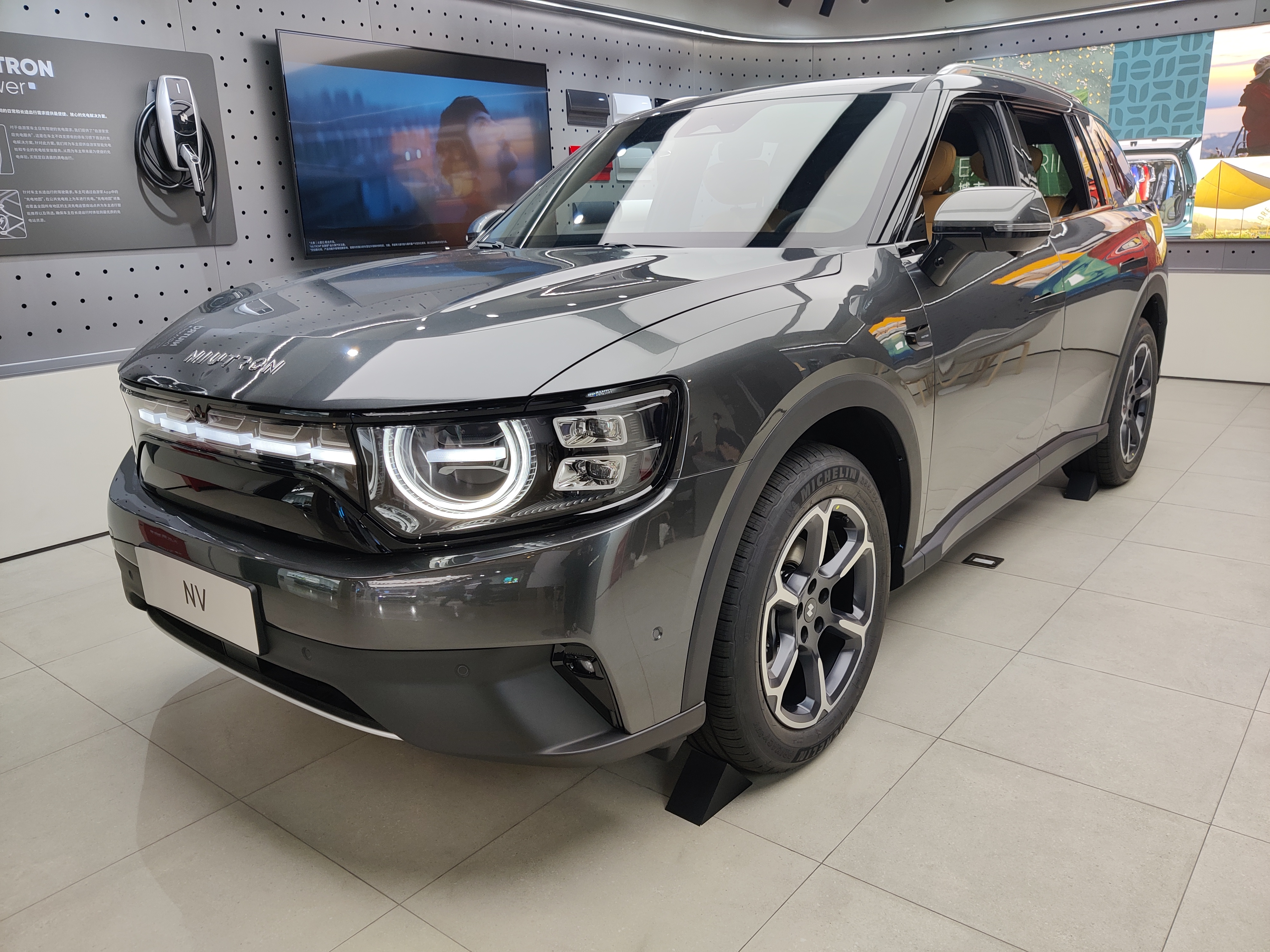
Niutron NV

Niutron (Mandarin: 自游家) is a Chinese electric car brand founded by Niu Technologies co-founder Yan Li on December 15, 2021. The mother company is called Huoxingshi Technology and is based in Beijing with its design center located in Shanghai, with vehicle R&D and manufacturing located in Changzhou.

== History ==
Niutron was founded by Yan Li, co-founder of electric scooter manufacturer Niu Technologies and former CTO of Chinese technology company Baidu. The company was founded in 2018 with $50 million USD in funding, later growing to $400 million USD.

In early December 2021, Niu released images of a concept car called the NIU 4 Fun, a 4 seater in the micro EV segment. On December 15, 2021 Niutron officially launched as a new startup independent of Niu Technologies. That day, digital images and details of the company's first production vehicle, the Niutron NV mid-size electric SUV, were revealed.

In March 2022, Niutron revealed the production version of the NV, along with specifications and pricing, with pre-orders opening at the end of the month. Low volume production was to begin at Changzhou in March, with deliveries starting in September 2022.

Niutron partnered with Dacheng Auto (大乘, anglicized as Dorcen) in a contract manufacturing agreement where the NV would be produced in Dorcen's Changzhou automobile factory. Before Dorcen experienced financial trouble and filed for bankruptcy in 2020, its Changzhou facility produced the Zotye Domy which had then been rebadged under the Dorcen brand. By late 2021, there were reports that Niutron was in talks to outright buy Dorcen's Changzhou facility, but Dorcen retained the Changzhou factory with money raised from selling their other factory to BYD.

Niutron moved their engineering offices to Changzhou once it had entered the contract manufacturing agreement with Dorcen, with an internally planned production start date in spring of 2022. However, after lockdown disruptions in the Shanghai area, the officially announced delivery date was pushed back to September. Near-final pre-production models of the NV were given to the media for a test drive in late August. The delayed production start date led to the Changzhou facility's production license to expire, as it had exceeded the inactivity limit of two years after not producing any vehicles due to the bankruptcy, and Dorcen was unable to recertify the facility.

This left Niutron without a production facility, and in December 2022, Niutron announced that the NV could not be delivered on time as promised, and a full refund to more than 24,000 consumers would be made within 48 hours. The company said that it was in talks with other contract manufacturers to replace Dorcen, and that they were aiming to deliver the first cars in early 2023. This did not happen in the end, and the company ceased operations in March 2023.

In June 2023, the Niutron NV resurfaced, with the vehicle now being marketed by Dorcen as the Docan V07. Niutron's Weibo page was found with all posts deleted at that time. Docan is the new anglicized name of the Dorcen brand, with the Chinese name remaining to be Dacheng (大乘).
