= Dorcen G60 =

Chinese compact crossover SUV

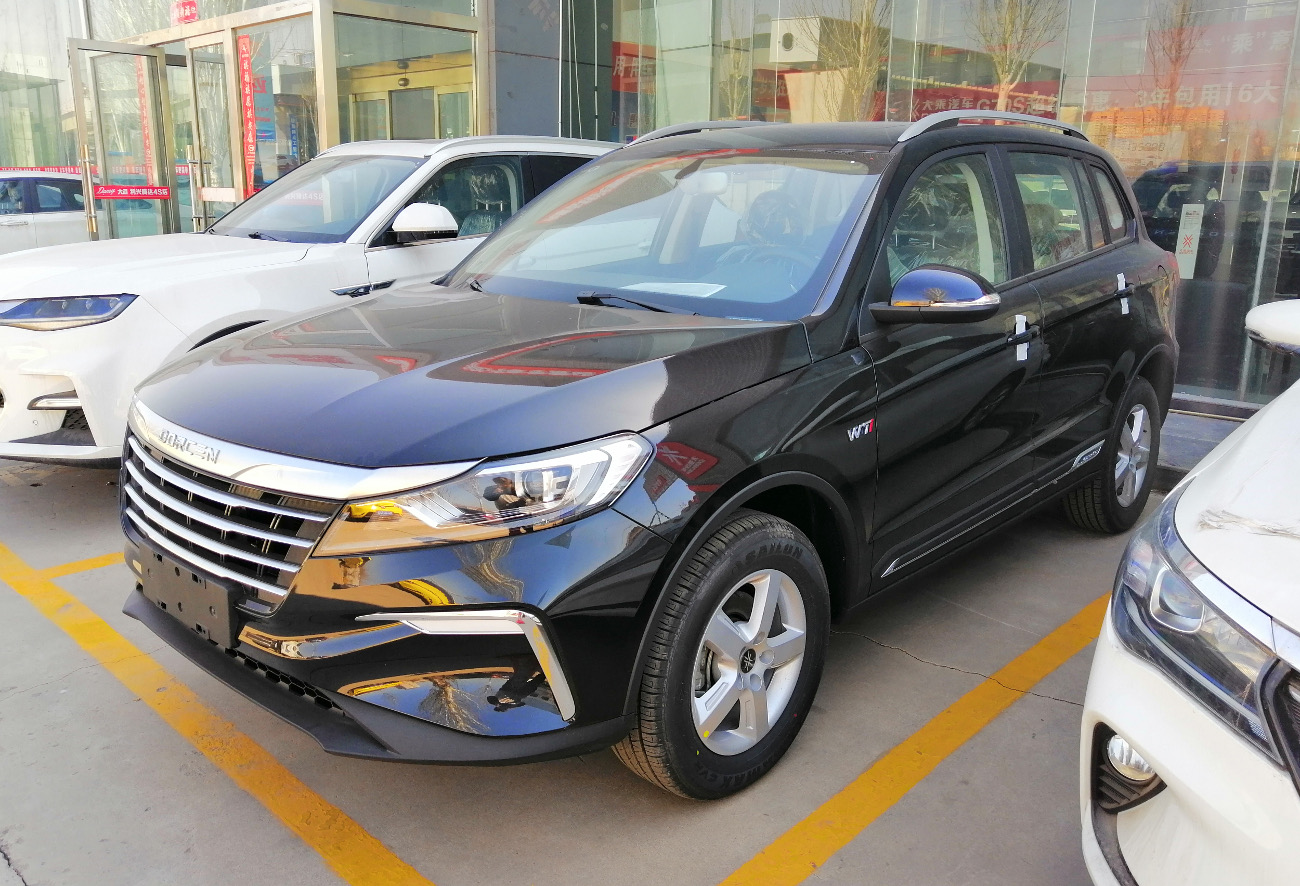

Overview
- Manufacturer: Dorcen
- Also called: Dorcen G60E
- Production: 2018–2021
- Assembly: China

Body and chassis
- Class: Compact crossover SUV (C)
- Body style: 5-door SUV
- Layout: Front-engine, front-wheel drive
- Related: Domy X5

Powertrain
- Engine: Petrol: 1.5 L I4 turbo; 1.6 L I4
- Transmission: 5-speed manual; CVT

Dimensions
- Wheelbase: 2,680 mm (105.5 in)
- Length: 4,523 mm (178.1 in)
- Width: 1,836 mm (72.3 in)
- Height: 1,682 mm (66.2 in)

The Dorcen G60 is a compact crossover SUV manufactured by Chinese automaker Dorcen.

== Overview ==
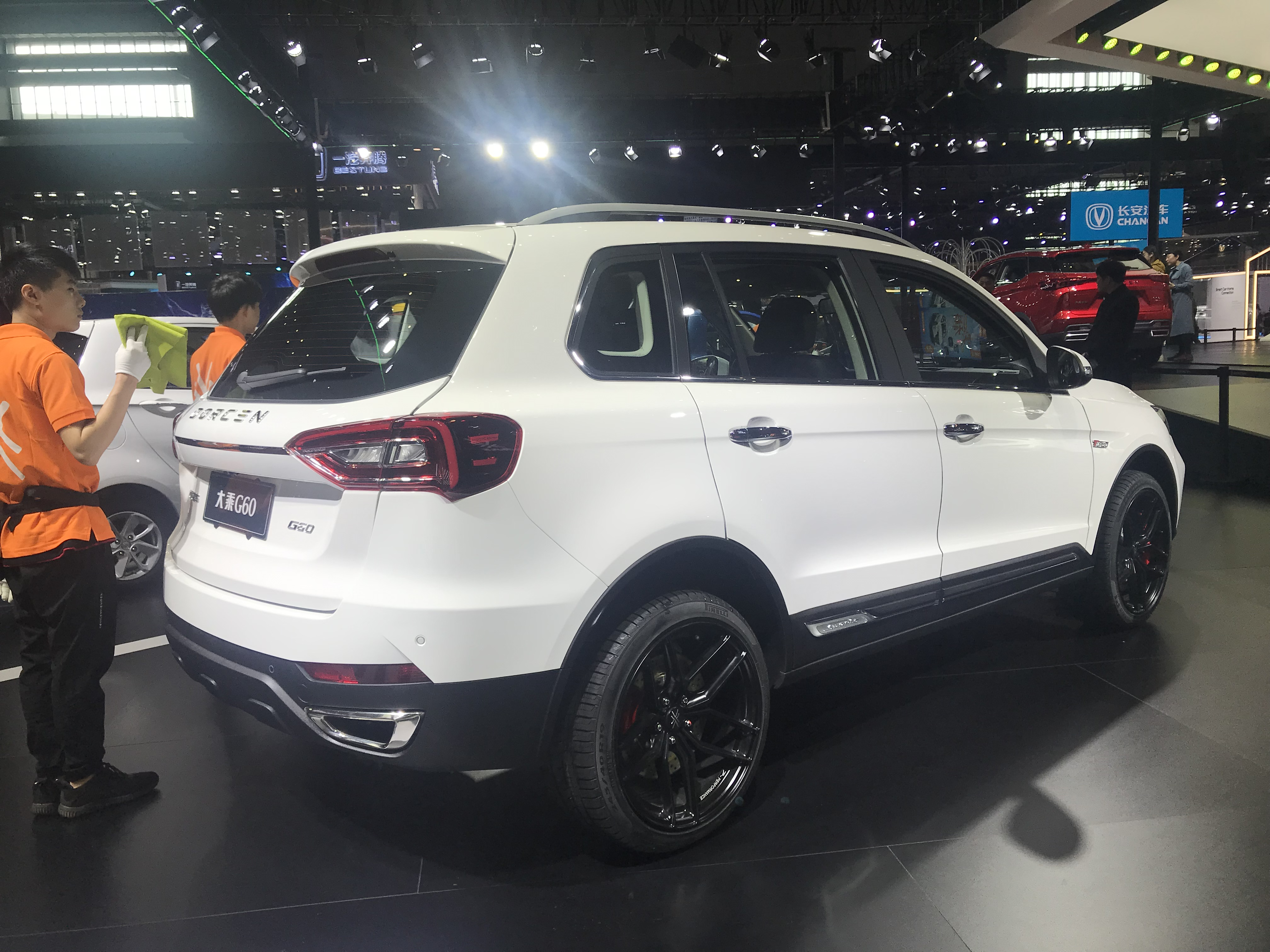
Dorcen G60 rear

Launched in March 2019 in China, the Dorcen G60 was introduced with prices ranging from 59,900 yuan to 69,900 yuan.

The production version of the Dorcen G60 was based on the Zotye Domy X5 with only the front and rear fascias redesigned. Its styling is controversial as the side profile of the original Domy X5 heavily resembles the Volkswagen Tiguan.

== Dorcen G60E ==
The Dorcen G60E is the electric version of the Dorcen G60. The Dorcen G60E was revealed during the 2019 Shanghai Auto Show with a single trim priced 181,800 yuan. The Dorcen G60E is power by a single motor producing 116 hp (85kw).

The only styling differentiation between the Dorcen G60 electric version and the gasoline version is limited to the grilles. The Dorcen G60E features mesh grilles with an integrated charging port in the center oppose to the horizontal slots on the Dorcen G60, while the rest of the vehicle is largely shared between the two versions including the fake exhaust pipes in the rear bumper.

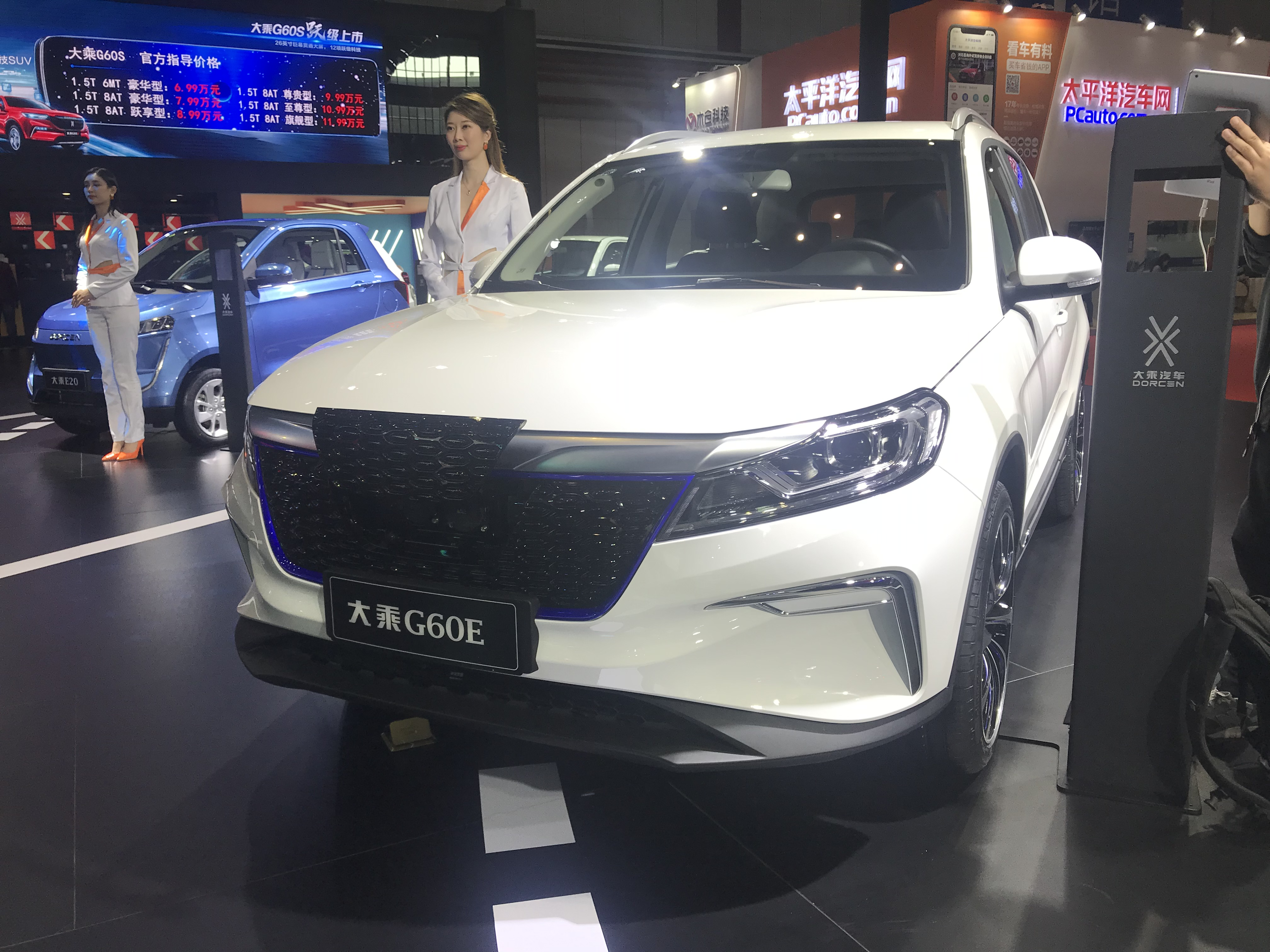
Dorcen G60E front

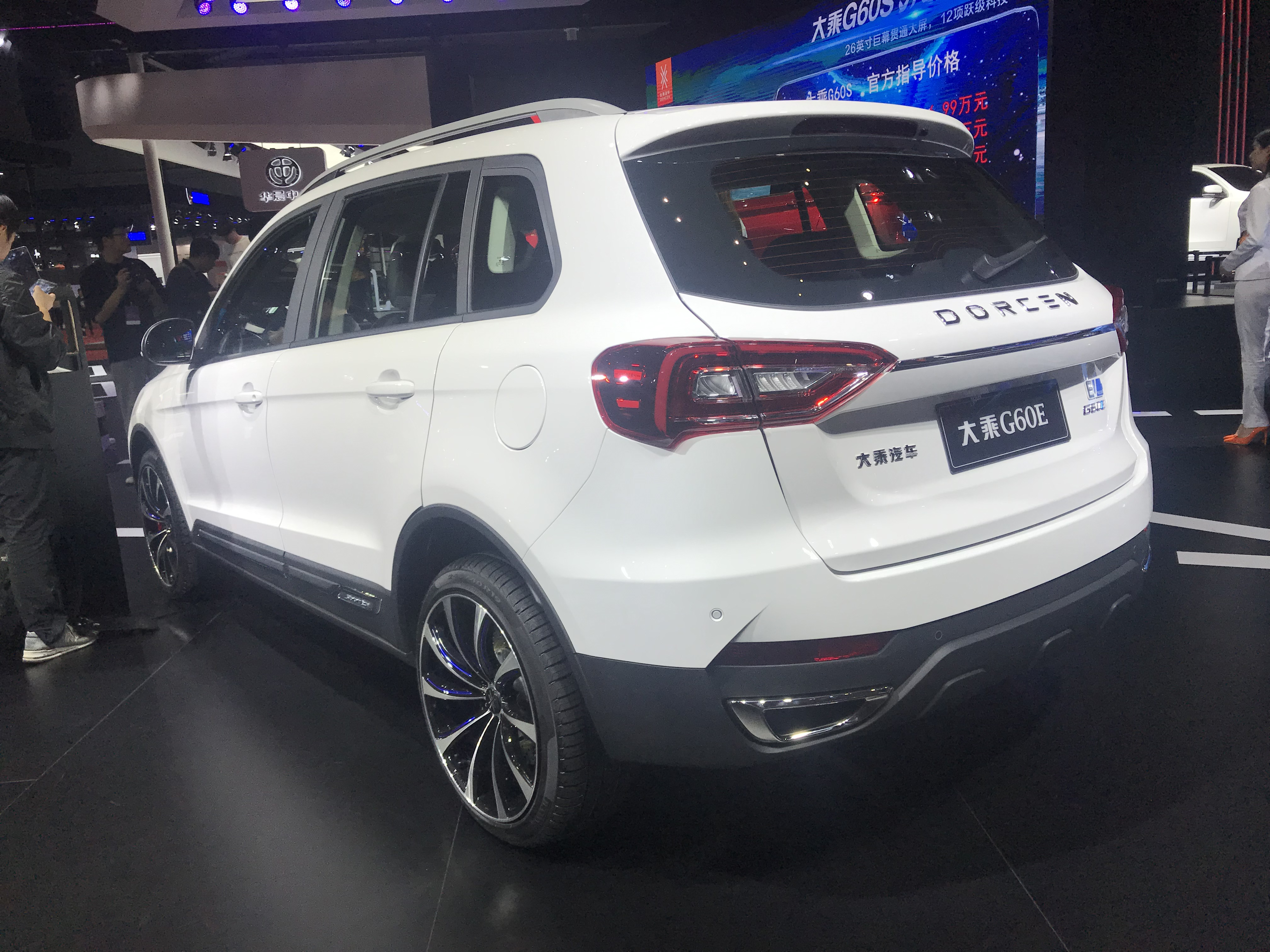
Dorcen G60E rear

== See also ==
- Domy X5 the car that the Dorcen G60 was based on
