= Qingyun County =

Qingyun County 庆云县
- County
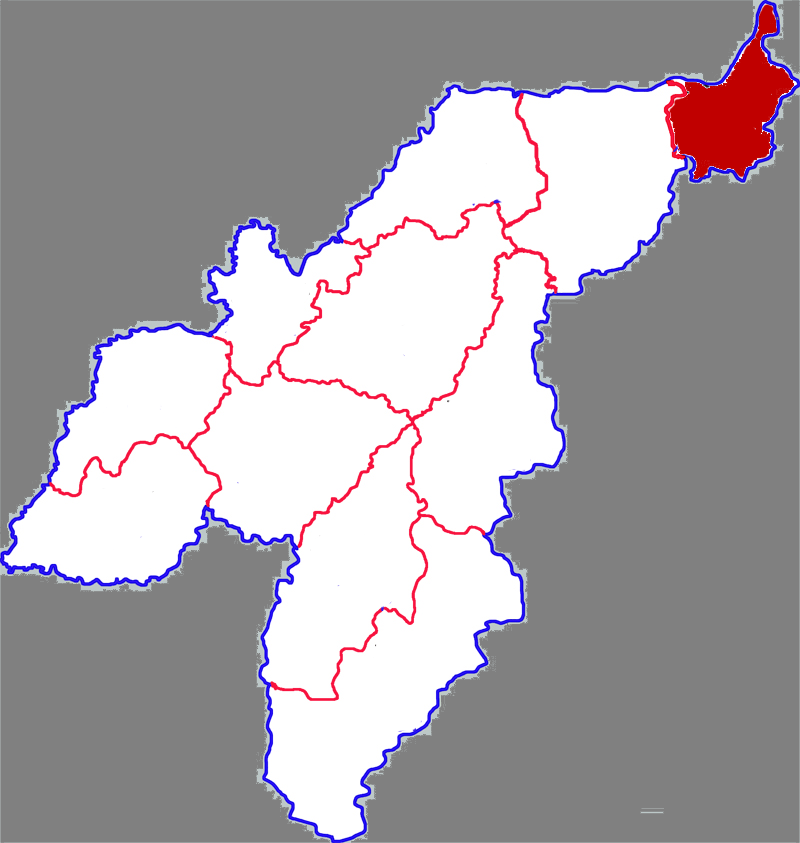
- Qingyun in Dezhou

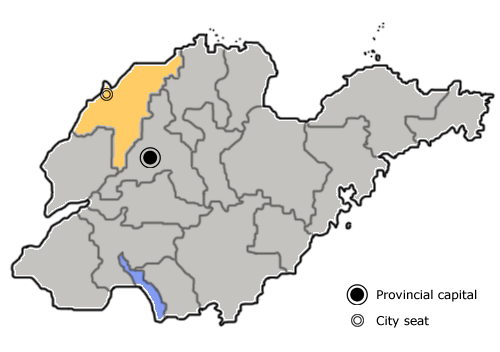
- Dezhou in Shandong
- Coordinates: 37°46′31″N 117°23′07″E
- Country: People's Republic of China
- Province: Shandong
- Prefecture-level city: Dezhou

Area
  - Total: 502 km^{2} (194 sq mi)

Population (2019)
  - Total: 307,400
  - Density: 612/km^{2} (1,590/sq mi)
- Time zone: UTC+8 (China Standard)
- Postal code: 253700

Qingyun County (simplified Chinese: 庆云县; traditional Chinese: 慶雲縣; pinyin: Qìngyún Xiàn) is a county of north-northwest Shandong province, People's Republic of China, bordering Hebei province to the north. It is the northernmost county-level division of the prefecture-level city of Dezhou.

The population was 289,986 in 1999.

== Administrative divisions ==
As of 2012, this County is divided to 1 subdistrict, 4 towns and 4 townships.

Subdistricts

- Bohailu Subdistrict (渤海路街道)

Towns

- Qingyun (庆云镇)
- Changjia (常家镇)
- Shangtang (尚堂镇)
- Cuikou (崔口镇)

Townships

- Yanwu Township (严务乡)
- Dongxindian Township (东辛店乡)
- Zhongding Township (中丁乡)
- Xuyuanzi Township (徐园子乡)

== Climate ==
Climate data for Qingyun, elevation 8 m (26 ft), (1991–2020 normals, extremes 1981–present)
Month	Jan	Feb	Mar	Apr	May	Jun	Jul	Aug	Sep	Oct	Nov	Dec	Year
Record high °C (°F)	17.6 (63.7)	20.5 (68.9)	30.1 (86.2)	31.2 (88.2)	38.2 (100.8)	41.1 (106.0)	40.5 (104.9)	37.6 (99.7)	35.4 (95.7)	30.8 (87.4)	26.1 (79.0)	17.0 (62.6)	41.1 (106.0)
Mean daily maximum °C (°F)	2.9 (37.2)	6.7 (44.1)	14.1 (57.4)	20.7 (69.3)	26.7 (80.1)	31.4 (88.5)	31.9 (89.4)	30.3 (86.5)	26.9 (80.4)	20.6 (69.1)	11.8 (53.2)	4.5 (40.1)	19.0 (66.3)
Daily mean °C (°F)	−2.9 (26.8)	0.4 (32.7)	7.4 (45.3)	14.1 (57.4)	20.3 (68.5)	25.1 (77.2)	26.9 (80.4)	25.5 (77.9)	20.8 (69.4)	13.9 (57.0)	5.8 (42.4)	−1.1 (30.0)	13.0 (55.4)
Mean daily minimum °C (°F)	−7.4 (18.7)	−4.4 (24.1)	1.7 (35.1)	8.2 (46.8)	14.1 (57.4)	19.2 (66.6)	22.6 (72.7)	21.6 (70.9)	15.9 (60.6)	8.6 (47.5)	1.1 (34.0)	−5.3 (22.5)	8.0 (46.4)
Record low °C (°F)	−18.5 (−1.3)	−16.5 (2.3)	−10.1 (13.8)	−2.1 (28.2)	5.0 (41.0)	9.9 (49.8)	16.7 (62.1)	11.1 (52.0)	5.7 (42.3)	−3.1 (26.4)	−12.0 (10.4)	−20.0 (−4.0)	−20.0 (−4.0)
Average precipitation mm (inches)	3.7 (0.15)	7.2 (0.28)	6.6 (0.26)	27.8 (1.09)	42.0 (1.65)	78.0 (3.07)	185.2 (7.29)	171.1 (6.74)	44.5 (1.75)	28.8 (1.13)	18.3 (0.72)	3.7 (0.15)	616.9 (24.28)
Average precipitation days (≥ 0.1 mm)	1.9	2.9	2.6	4.8	5.6	8.0	11.4	10.1	6.5	4.6	3.6	2.4	64.4
Average snowy days	2.6	3.1	1.0	0.2	0	0	0	0	0	0	0.9	1.8	9.6
Average relative humidity (%)	61	59	53	57	62	63	78	83	77	71	68	64	66
Mean monthly sunshine hours	152.0	160.3	226.2	237.4	270.8	238.9	201.6	204.5	201.5	188.2	161.8	153.6	2,396.8
Percentage possible sunshine	50	52	61	60	61	54	45	49	55	55	54	52	54
Source: China Meteorological Administrationall-time extreme temperatureall-time August high
