= Aoxin =

Chinese automobile manufacturer

- Type: Private
- Industry: Automotive
- Founded: 2006; 20 years ago
- Headquarters: Yancheng, Jiangsu
- Website: http://aoxinauto.com/

Aoxin (Chinese: 奥新) or Jiangsu Aoxin New Energy Automobile Co., Ltd. (江苏奥新新能源汽车有限公司) is a Chinese automobile manufacturer headquartered in Jiangsu, China, is a low-speed electric vehicle company that produces Neighborhood Electric Vehicles.

== History ==
Aoxin was founded in 2006, and is based in Jiangsu. Aoxin has current exported products to United States, New Zealand, Spain, Germany, and Italy. The company's main goal is to create light-weight electric vehicles. By 2050, Aoxin plans to have 56 vehicles, including a garbage truck, garbage dump truck, sweeper truck, electric van, pure electric self-loading and unloading garbage truck, electric stake truck, electric vending truck, and an electric advertising vehicle. Most of Aoxin's service vehicles are made and produced by Dafudi.

Their factory is 2.21 square kilometers large, and includes a park and test track. The factory also produces 200,000 sets of automotive composites material of various preparation forming process. It will also have the ability to make 30,000 sets of three kinds of extender (fuel extender, gas turbines, and fuel battery).

Aoxin produced the Star truck in 2009. It was a low-speed, cost effective small truck. Aoxin said "Because this small truck is practical, convenient, cost-effective, it quickly became very important and popular means of transportation for peoples in the United States and some other places for cargo transportation and courier usage."

Aoxin then made the AEV1, a 5-door hatchback. It was made in 2009.

The Aoxin eGo is a 3-door, 2 seat compact hatchback made and introduced in 2011. Its dimensions are 2960 mm/1710 mm/1598 mm, a wheelbase of 1958 mm, with a kerb weight of 800 kg.

In 2014, Aoxin created the IBIS sedan. The IBIS is also known as the Aoxin E45 or Aoxin Heying. The body is made of carbon fiber with an aluminum frame. Its dimensions measure 5000 mm/1898 mm/1605 mm with kerb weight of 1815 kg.

The A59 is an electric dump truck. It measures 3920 mm/1500 mm/1900 mm, with a wheelbase of 2500 mm, and a kerb weight of 1330 kg.

Aoxin's X30L is a large-sized van. It was first produced in 2019, with an average unit production of 2,000 per year.

The Aoxin A1XD is a 2-door compact box truck. It was renamed the Dafudi A1XD from 2018 to 2019, but as of January 2020, it became remade under the Aoxin brand. Its dimensions measure 4330 mm/1500 mm/2210 mm, with a wheelbase of 2500mm, and a kerb weight of 1280 kg. It takes 5-6 hours to fully charge.

The Environmental Sanitation is an electric street sweeper. Its dimensions are 4400 mm/1500 mm/2150 mm, with a wheelbase of 2500 mm, and a weight of 1670 kg. It has been rated 95% cleaning efficiency in China, 93% in Japan, 97% in Germany, and 88% in the United States.

== Vehicles ==
=== Aoxin eGo ===
- Body style: Hatchback
- Class: A
- Doors: 3
- Seats: 2
- Battery: 4 kWh
- Production: 2011–present
- Revealed: 2011

=== Aoxin IBIS ===
- Body style: Sedan
- Doors: 4
- Seats: 5
- Battery: 72 kWh
- Production: 2016–present
- Revealed: 2014 Shanghai Auto Show, 2015 New Energy Auto Show

=== Aoxin Star ===
- Body style: pickup truck
- Doors: 2
- Seats: 5
- Production: 2009–present
- Revealed: 2009 Shanghai Electric Vehicles And Energy-saving Exhibition

=== Aoxin AEV1 ===
- Body style: Hatchback
- Doors: 5
- Battery: lithium iron phosphate
- Production: 2009–present

=== Aoxin A59 ===
- Body style: Garbage truck
- Doors: 2
- Seats: 5
- Battery: Lithium

=== Aoxin A1XD ===
- Body style: Box truck
- Doors: 2
- Seats: 5

=== Aoxin Environmental Sanitation ===
- Body style: Street Sweeper
- Doors: 2
- Seats: 2
- Battery: Three-element lithium

=== Aoxin X30L ===
- Body style: Van
- Production: 2019–present

== Models Sold under Dafudi brand ==
=== Refrigerated trucks ===
- JAX5024XLCBEVF266LB15M2X1
- JAX5020XLCBEVF216LB15M2X1

=== Box truck cargo van ===
- JAX5021XXYBEVF220LB15M2X1
- JAX5025XXYBEVF216LB15M2X2
- JAX5026XXYBEVF216LB15M2X1
- JAX5024XXYBEVF268LB15M2X1
- JAX5024XXYBEVF268LB15M2X2
- JAX5025XXYBEVF216LB15M2X1
- JAX5024XXYBEVF266LB15M2X1
- JAX5024XXYBEVF216LB15M2X1
- JAX5021XXYBEVF216LB15M2X2
- JAX5021XXYBEVF216LB15M2X1
- JAX5044XXYBEVF230LB70M2X2
- JAX5027XXYBEVF276LB15M2X1
- JAX5020XXYBEVF135LAB15M2X2
- JAX5021XXYBEV
- JAX5023XXYBEVF120LB15M2X2
- JAX5023XXYBEV
- JAX5022XXYBEVF170LB15M2X1
- JAX5022XXYBEV
- JAX5022XXYBEVF120LB15M2X2
- JAX5020XXYBEV
- JAX5020XXYBEVF120LB15M2X2
- JAX5020CPYBEVF135LAB15M1X1
- JAX5020CPYBEVF120LB15M1X1

=== Stake truck ===
- JAX5020CCYBEVF120LB15M1C1
- JAX5020CCYBEVF135LAB15M1C1

=== Mobile shop ===
- JAX5020XSHBEVF120LB15M3X1
- JAX5020XSHBEVF135LAB15M3X1

=== Garbage Truck ===
- JAX5025ZZZBEVF170LB15M2Z1
- JAX5022ZZZBEVF170LB15M2Z1
- JAX5020ZLJBEVF120LB15M1Z1
- JAX5020ZLJBEVF135LAB15M1Z1
- JAX5022CTYBEVF170LB15M2C1
- JAX5022ZXXBEVF170LB15M2Z1
- JAX5023ZXXBEV
- JAX5020ZXXBEV
- JAX5022ZXXBEV
- JAX5021ZXXBEV

=== Propaganda van ===
- JAX5020XXCBEVF120LB15M5X1
- JAX5020XXCBEVF135LAB15M5X1

=== Street sweeper ===
- JAX5060TSLQLIV
- JAX5070TSLQLIIICS
- JAX5060TSLQLIIICS
- JAX5070TSLQLIICS
- JAX5061TSLBJIIICS
- JAX5043TSLQLIIICS
- JAX5150TSLDFIIICS
- JFQ5070TSLQLIIICS
- JFQ5060TSLQLIIICS
- JFQ5070TSLQLIICS
- JFQ5061TSLBJIIICS
- JFQ5043TSLQLIIICS
- JFQ5150TSLDFIIICS
- JAX5022TSLBEVF170LB15M1T1
- JAX5024TSLBEVF266LB15M1T1

== Sales ==
From 2019 to 2020, Aoxin sold 120,000 units.

== See also ==
- Bordrin
- Lichi (car brand)
- Sinogold
- Gyon
- BYD
