= Gyon =

Chinese automobile manufacturer

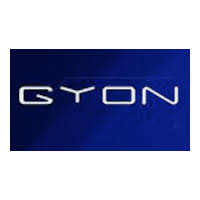
- Type: Private
- Industry: Automotive
- Founded: 2018; 8 years ago
- Founder: Joe Chao
- Headquarters: Chengdu, China
- Owner: SiTech

Gyon (Chinese: 吉翁) is a Chinese automobile manufacturer headquartered in Chengdu, China, that specializes in producing electric vehicles.

== History ==
Gyon was founded in 2018 by Joe Chao, and is based in Chengdu. Gyon is a luxury car branch of the automotive company SiTech.

On August 8, 2018, Gyon announced a partnership with Gaffoglio Family Metalcrafters, a company based in Fountain Valley, California. Gyon plans to create vehicles with a charging time of 15 minutes. As of 2020, Gyon built a total of 5,000 electric charging stations around China. Gyon plans to launch 9 production vehicles from 2018 to 2026.

Gyon's concept vehicle, the Matchless Concept, was introduced at the 2019 Shanghai Auto Show. It includes the G-OS AI system. SAE level 3 advanced driver assistance, G-Pilot, Autonomous Valet Parking (AVP), augmented reality heads-up display (AR-HUD), high-precision maps, AI assistance Viki, and a biometric system called GYON ID. Drivers can also search and reserve a charging spot with one click. It has also been shown in New York and Los Angeles.

== Vehicles ==
=== Concept Models ===
Gyon has 1 concept vehicle.

Model	Photo	Specifications
Gyon Matchless Concept		Body style: Sports luxury vehicle Class: Shooting-brake Doors: 4 Seats: 4 Battery: Lithium-ion Production: Revealed: 2019 Shanghai Auto Show

== See also ==
- Bordrin
- Lichi (car brand)
- Sinogold
