= Levdeo =

Chinese automobile manufacturer

- Trade name: Levdeo Automobile Group Co., Ltd.
- Native name: 雷丁汽车集团有限公司
- Formerly: Shandong Mailad Energy Power Technology Co., Ltd.
- Type: Private
- Industry: Automotive
- Founded: 2008; 18 years ago
- Founder: Li Guoxin
- Defunct: May 2023
- Fate: Defunct
- Headquarters: Weifang, Shandong, China
- Key people: Chairman: Wang Dejin
- Products: Pure electric vehicle
- Owner: Bidwin Holdings Group Co., Ltd.（100%）
- Website: www.levdeo.com

Levdeo (Chinese: 雷丁) or LETIN was a Chinese motor vehicle manufacturer headquartered in Shandong, China, that specialized in producing electric vehicles, marketing its models under the Letin brand until 2023.

== History ==
Li Guoxin was registered and established as Weifang Bidwen Electric Vehicle Manufacturing Co., Ltd. in 2002 and entered the electric bicycle manufacturing business.

Levdeo was founded in 2008, and was based in Shandong. It was originally a low-speed electric vehicle company that produced Neighborhood Electric Vehicles.

In 2010, Li Guoxin registered and established a subsidiary, Bidwen Holding Group Co., Ltd., which was the controlling shareholder of Levdeo.

In April 2018, Levdeo Auto acquired Shaanxi Qinxing Auto, thereby obtaining the production qualification of new energy commercial vehicles and special vehicles and establishing a production base in Xianyang; In January 2019, Levdeo acquired Yema Auto in order to enter the full size electric vehicle market. Levdeo revealed plans to strategically reorganize it, with plans to launch electric vehicles built on existing Yemo gasoline vehicle platforms and upgraded low-speed electric vehicle platforms under the newly launched Letin brand.

Levdeo launched the i3 under the Letin brand in 2019. The i3 was available in 3 variants, the i3 Base, i3 K-version, and the i3 Comfort. Its dimensions measure 3420 mm × 1500 mm × 1570 mm, and a wheelbase of 2297 mm, with a kerb weight of 830 kg. It takes 9 hours to fully charge. The base price is ¥62,800.

The i5 was also launched under the Letin brand in 2019. It is available as the i5 Base model and the i5 Comfort model. It measures 4055 mm × 1630 mm × 1510 mm. The wheelbase is 2400 mm and its weight is 1010 kg. Its base price is ¥75,800.

Levdeo's third vehicle was the Letin i9, which was launched in 2020 based on the same platform as the Yema T60 (博骏, Bojun), or essentially a rebadged Yema EC60. Its dimensions are 4360 mm × 1830 mm × 1660 mm, a wheelbase of 2550 mm, and a kerb weight of 1510 kg. It takes 7 hours to charge fully. It costs ¥115,800.

According to relevant statistics, from January to October 2022, Levdeo's cumulative sales were 6,878 units. The company's production base in Mianyang was originally scheduled to be completed in August 2022, but the project was delayed due to the COVID-19 epidemic and the continued high temperatures in China in 2022. On November 21 of the same year, Levdeo completed its Series A financing with a total financing amount of 3.2 billion yuan, led by Weifang Weicheng Western Investment Development Group, and followed by state-owned capital, industry and private capital from Shandong Province and cities.

According to media reports, Li Guoxin had a close relationship with Wang Shuhua, former vice mayor of Weifang and secretary of the Changle County Party Committee. On September 28, 2020, Wang Shuhua was investigated for suspected serious violations of discipline and law, during which Li Guoxin was taken away to assist in the investigation. After the investigation, Li Guoxin handed over the management of Levdeo to a professional manager and then immigrated to Canada with his family. In December of the same year, Li Guoxin resigned from all positions in the parent company Bidwin.

In December 2021, several dealer managers stated that Levdeo had delayed payment to dealers. In November 2022, Levdeo said in an interview with the media that funds and production capacity were relatively tight, and vehicle delivery could only be guaranteed in key markets and key regions.

On January 14, 2023, Li Guoxin published an article on the WeChat official account of Levdeo, reporting the Changle County Party Secretary Wang Xiao by real name, accusing Wang Xiao of forcing Levdeo to falsely report its output value of 4.683 billion yuan in order to highlight local political achievements since March 2022. In July 2022, the loan guaranteed by the Changle County government for the acquisition of Mustang Automobile expired, but Wang Xiao did not renew the loan for the company. As Levdeo did not receive government support and could not obtain financing, the factory was shut down. On the same evening, Weifang City officials announced that Shandong Province had set up a joint investigation team composed of relevant provincial and municipal departments to enter Changle County to investigate the matter. On July 25, 2023, the Shandong Provincial and Municipal Joint Investigation Team reported the relevant situation, pointing out that because the Changle County Government's continued financing support for the enterprise "did not comply with relevant national and provincial and municipal regulations", the government did not apply after comprehensive analysis, and after investigation it was found to be in compliance with regulations. Regarding the error in the total industrial output value of Levdeo, the notice pointed out that Levdeo actually falsely reported 4.543 billion yuan and promptly corrected the relevant data. The investigation determined that the Changle County Industry and Information Technology Bureau and the Zhuliu Street Office where Levdeo is located had interfered with statistical data. Regarding the issue of Wang Xiao, secretary of the Changle County Party Committee, forcing enterprises to falsify statistical data, the whistleblower was unable to provide evidence after questioning. Afterwards, the county party and government agencies and enterprise leaders were interviewed and questioned. None of them reflected that Wang Xiao interfered with statistical data. The investigation determined that the relevant departments were responsible for negligence and Wang Xiao bore the primary leadership responsibility for this.The local disciplinary inspection and supervision authorities have dealt with the nine responsible persons involved in this case.

In May 2023, Levdeo applied for bankruptcy according to Court of Changle County Weifang City. As of January 5, 2024, the total amount of execution against Levdeo exceeded RMB 120 million.

On April 30, 2024, Levdeo completed bankruptcy reorganization.

== Vehicles ==
=== Current models ===
Levdeo currently has 10 production vehicles.

==== Letin Mengo (Pro) ====
- Body style: Citycar
- Doors: 5
- Seats: 4
- Battery: 17 kWh
- Production: 2020–2023
- Revealed: 2020
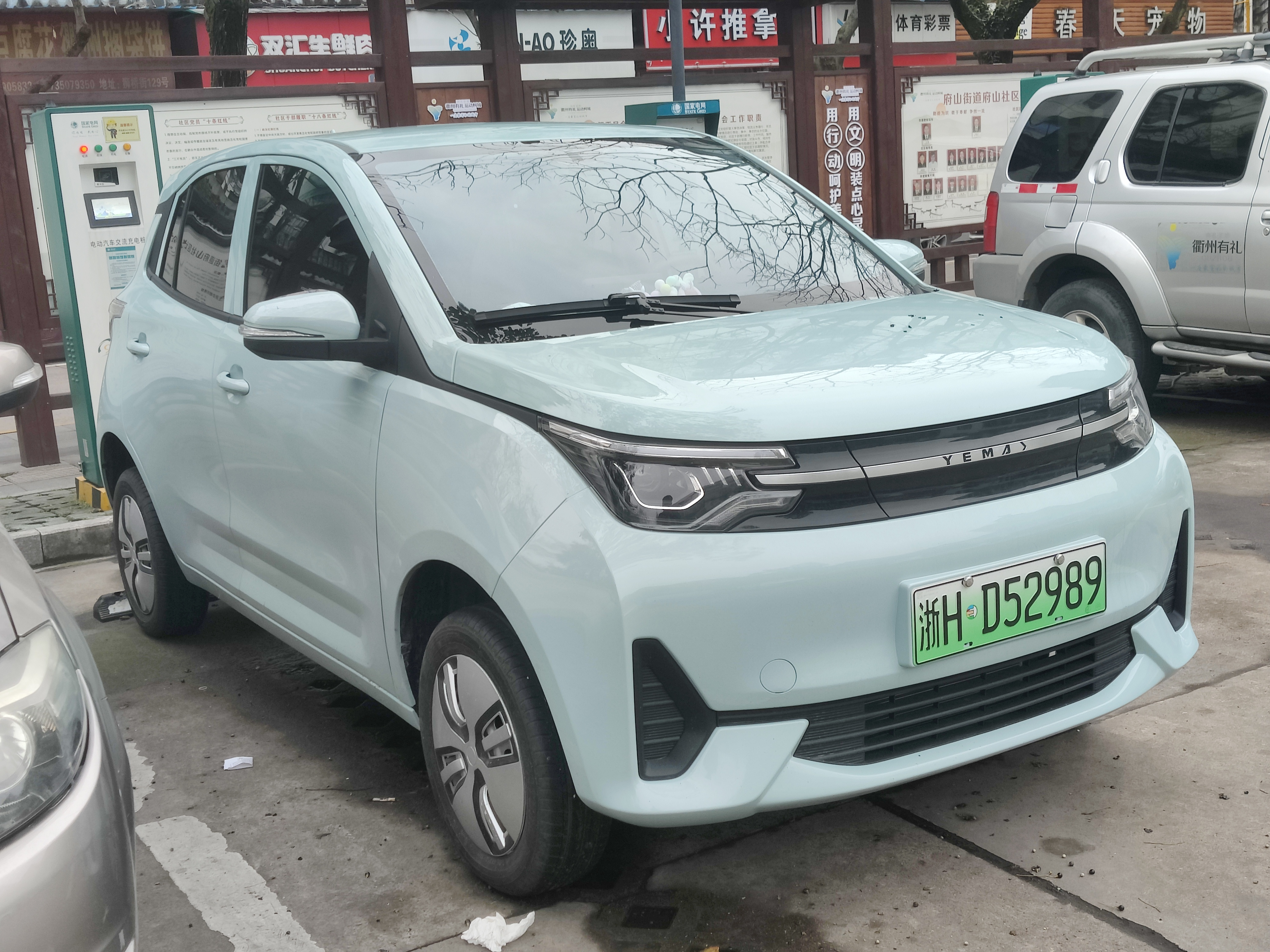
Letin Mengo

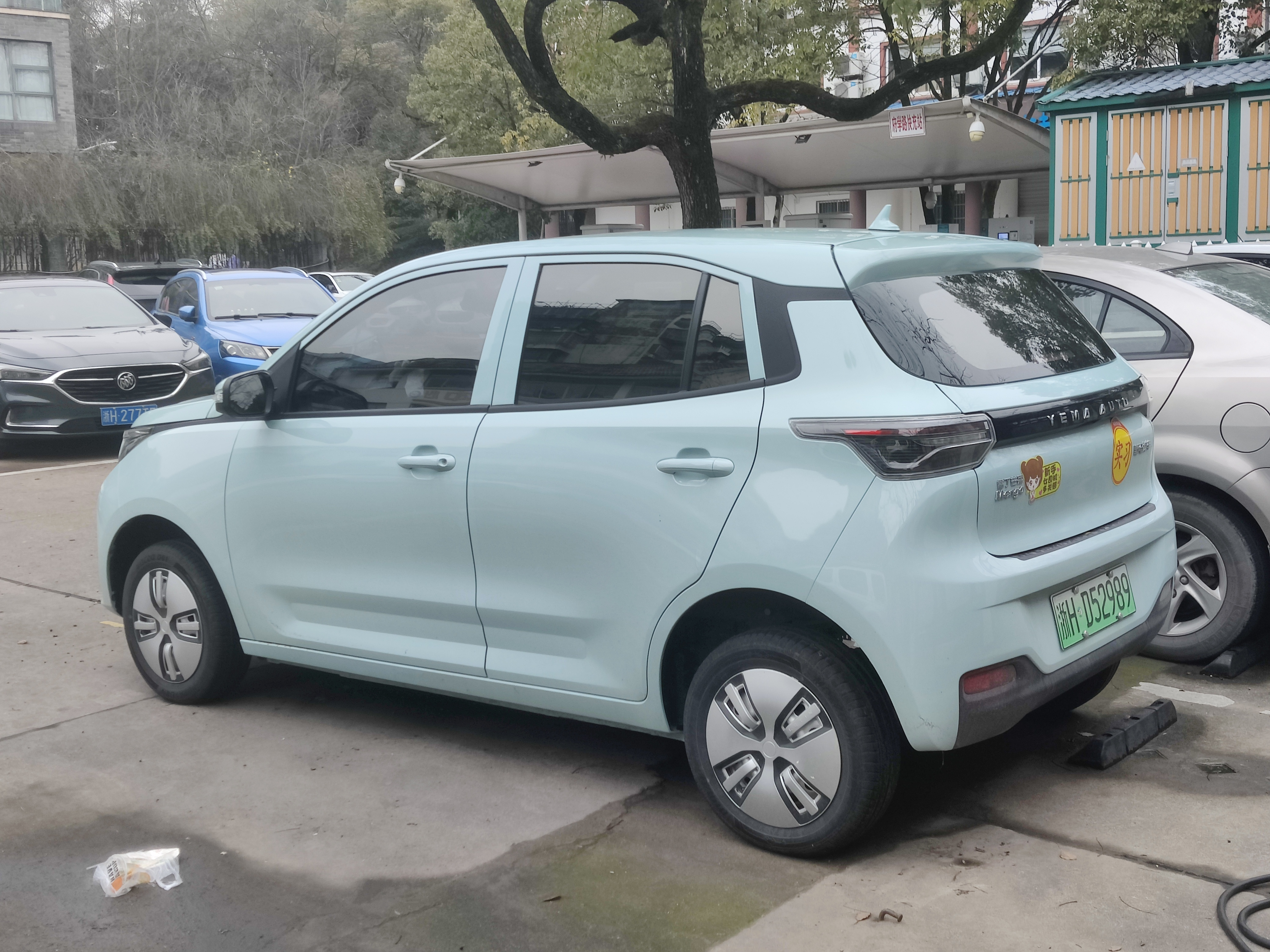
rear

==== Levdeo i3 ====
- Body style: Citycar
- Doors: 5
- Seats: 4
- Battery: 17 kWh
- Production: 2019–2023
- Revealed: 2019

==== Levdeo i5 ====
- Body style: Sedan
- Doors: 5
- Seats: 4
- Battery: 25.55 kWh
- Production: 2019–2023
- Revealed: 2019

==== Levdeo i9 ====
- Body style: SUV
- Doors: 5
- Seats: 5
- Battery: 51.06 kWh
- Production: 2020–2023
- Revealed: 2019
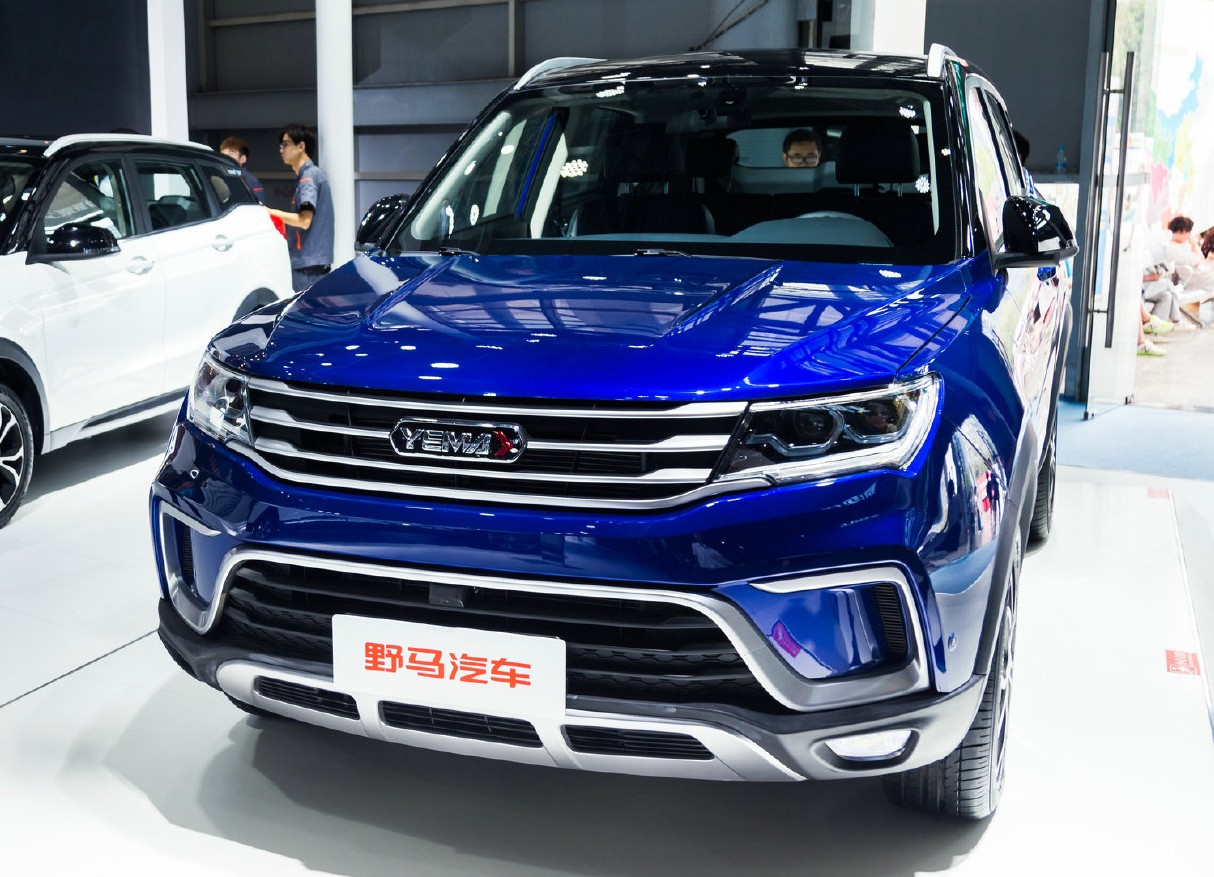
Levdeo i9

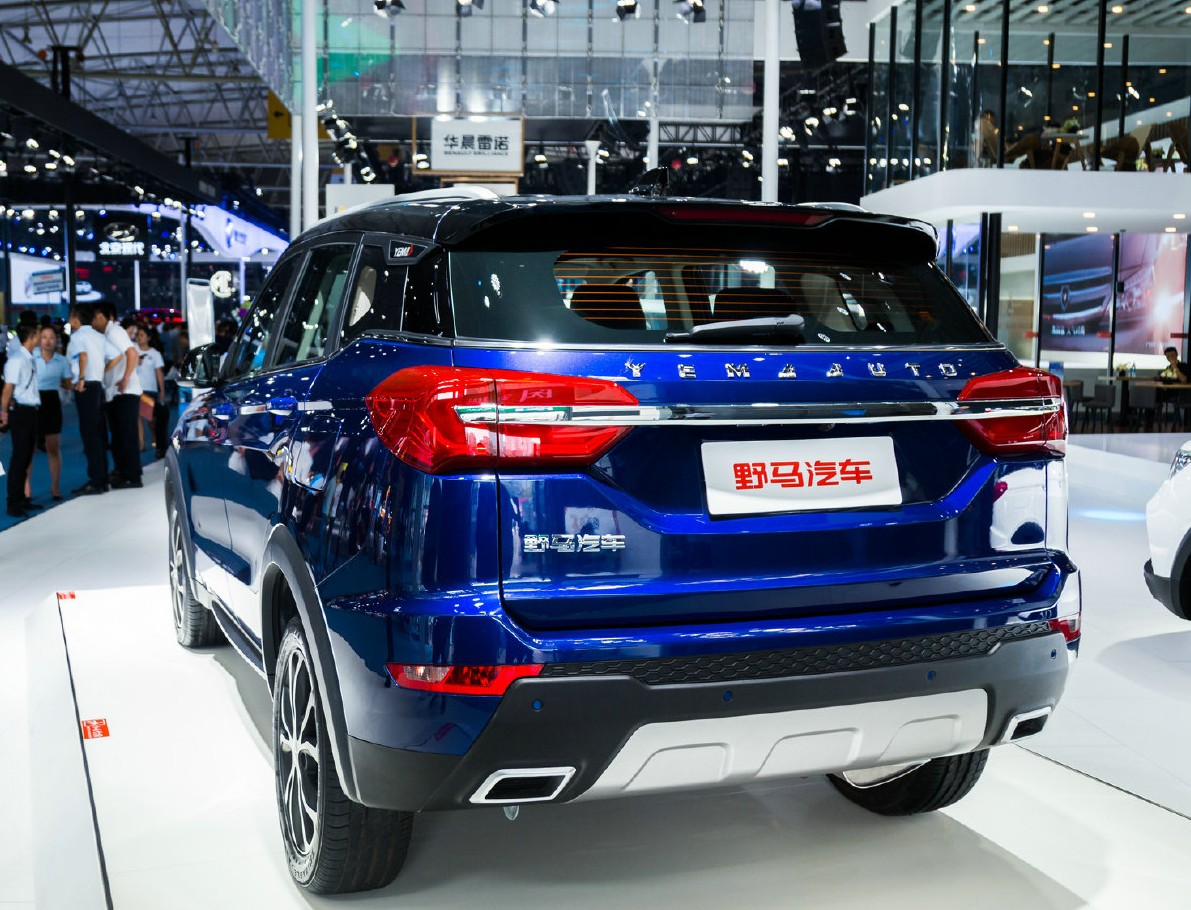
rear

==== Levdeo D30 ====
- Body Style: Hatchback
- Doors: 5
- Seats: 4
- Production: 2014–2023
- Revealed: 2014

==== Levdeo D50 ====
- Body style: Hatchback
- Doors: 5
- Seats: 5
- Battery:
- Production: 2014–2023
- Revealed: 2014
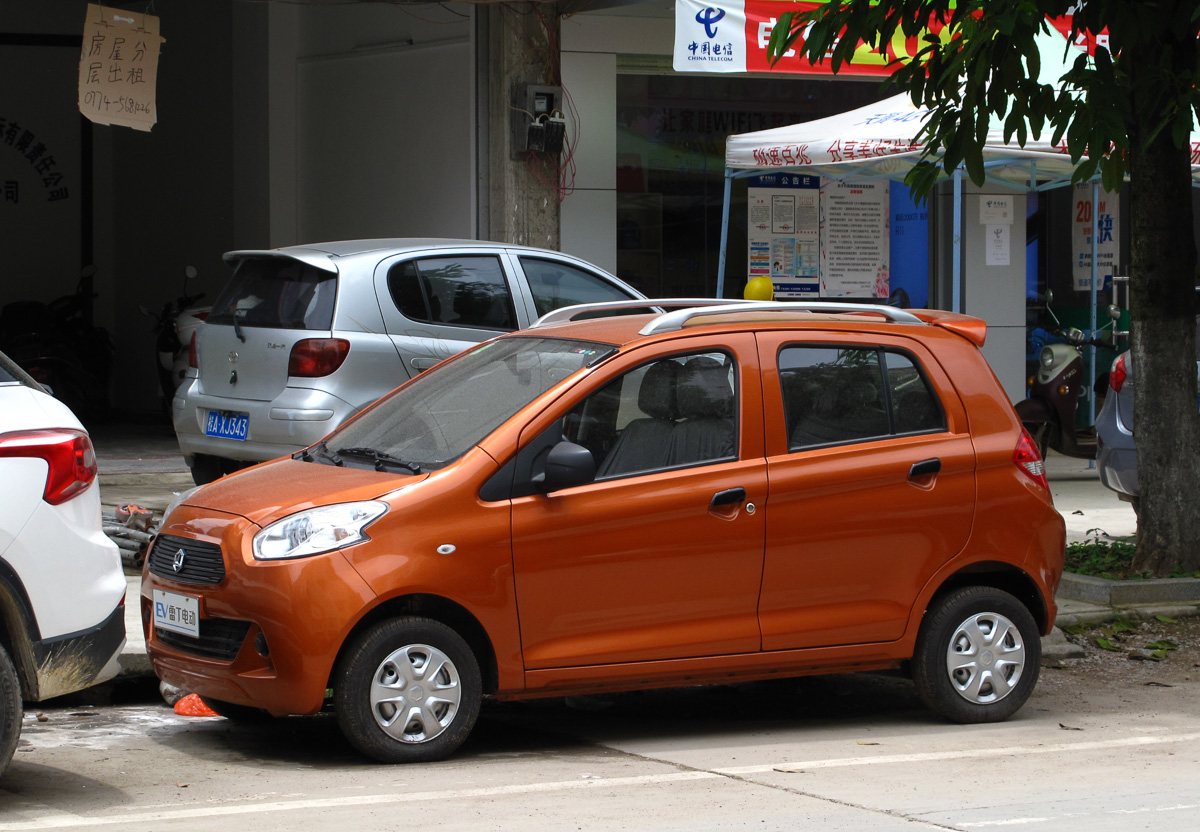
  Levdeo D50

==== Levdeo D60/E60 ====
- Body Style: Sedan
- Doors: 5
- Seats: 5
- Battery: 220V
- Production: 2015–2023
- Revealed: 2015

==== Levdeo D70 ====
- Body Style: Hatchback
- Doors: 5
- Seats: 5
- Battery:
- Production: 2015–2023
- Revealed: 2015
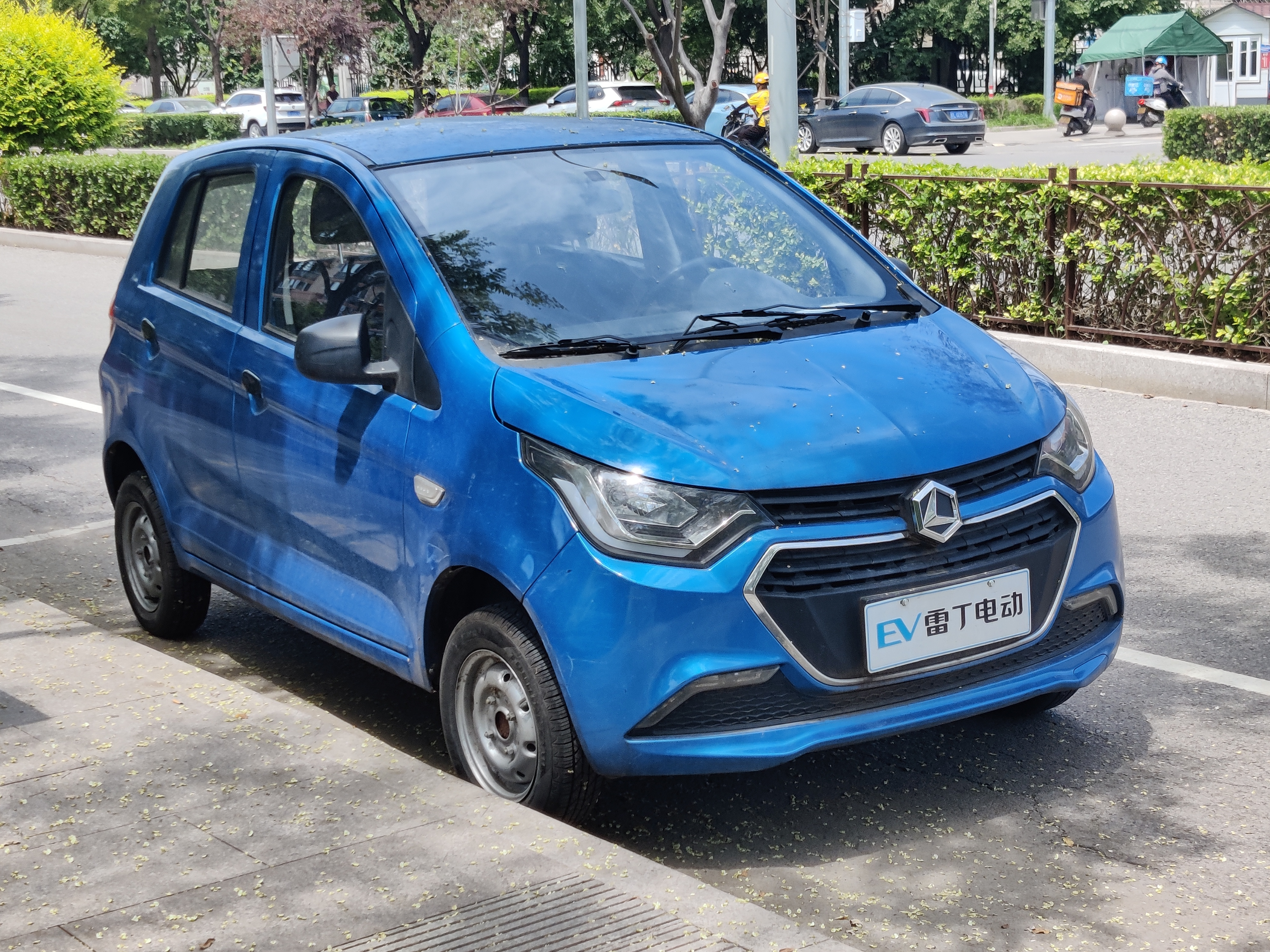
Levdeo D70

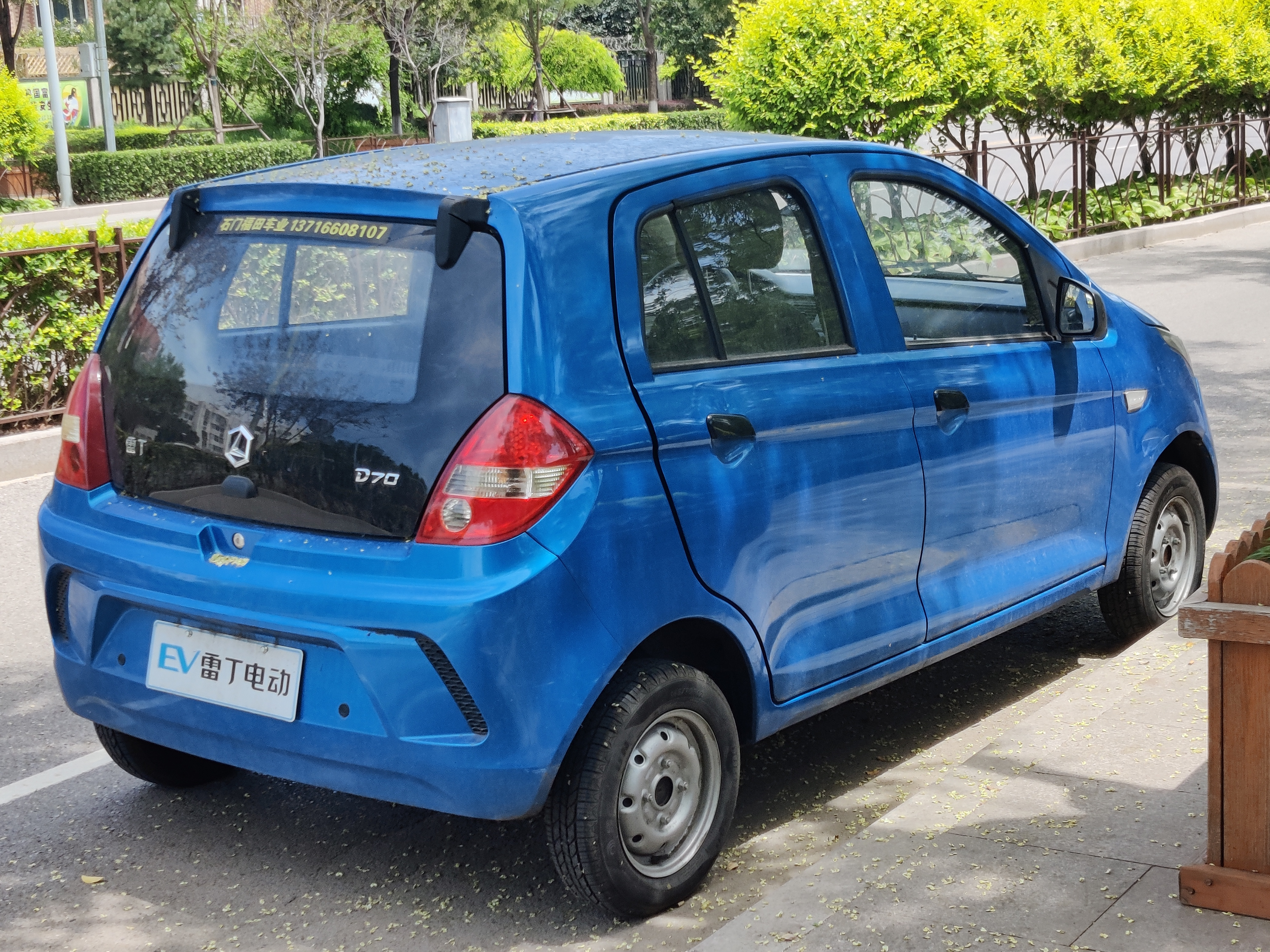
rear

==== Levdeo S50 ====
- Body Style: SUV
- Doors: 5
- Seats: 5
- Battery:
- Production:
- Revealed:

==== Levdeo G10 ====
- Body style: Bus
- Doors:
- Seats: 24
- Battery:
- Production: 2018–2023
- Revealed: 2018

==== Levdeo V60 ====
- Body style: hatchback
- Doors: 3
- Seats: 4
- Battery:
- Production:
- Revealed:

== See also ==
- Leapmotor
- Min'an Electric
- Sinogold
- Bordrin
