= Techrules =

Chinese automobile manufacturer

- Type: Private
- Industry: Automotive
- Founded: 2015; 11 years ago
- Headquarters: Yizhuang, China
- Website: www.techrules.cn

Techrules (Chinese: 泰克鲁斯·腾风) is a Chinese automobile manufacturer headquartered in Yizhuang, China that specializes in producing sports cars.

== History ==
Techrules was founded in 2015, and is based in Yizhuang, China.

The AT96 was Techrules's first car, coming out in 2016. It uses a multi-fuel (jet fuel, kerosene, natural gas, biogas) aviation turbine to charge the batteries. It has 1030 hp and 6372 lb-ft of torque, a 0-60 mph time of 2.5 seconds, and a top speed of 218 mph. The GT96 was an all diesel version of the AT96.

Their second vehicle was the Techrules Ren, which came out in 2018. It is a high performance sports car that uses a diesel turbine engine as well as an option of 3 electric batteries. Its annual output is 10 units per year. It has a top speed of 199 mph. The Ren is not street legal in the US or Europe.

== Vehicles ==
=== Current models ===
Techrules currently has three production vehicles.

Model	Photo	Specifications
Techrules Ren		Body style: Sports car Class: S Doors: 1 Seats: 3 Battery/Motor: 14 kWh lithium-ion, 25 kWh lithium-ion, 32 kWh lithium-ion Production: 2018-present Revealed: 2018 Geneva Motor Show
Techrules AT96		Body style: Sports car Class: S Doors: 2 (Scissor doors) Seats: 2 Battery/Motor: Multi-fuel aviation turbine Production: 2016-present Revealed: 2016 Geneva Motor Show
Techrules GT96		Body style: Sports car Class: S Doors: 2 Seats: 2 Battery/Motor: Diesel turbine Production: 2016-present Revealed: 2016 Geneva Motor Show

== See also ==
- Leapmotor
- Levdeo
- Aoxin
