= B30 =

B30 may refer to:

- Bestune B30 or Besturn B30, a Chinese car produced by the FAW Group
- Bundesstraße 30, a German road
- Lockheed XB-30, an aircraft
- Route B30 (WMATA), a bus route operating between BWI Airport and Greenbelt Metrorail Station
- B30, a spent fuel storage pond at the Sellafield nuclear reprocessing site
- Sicilian Defence, Encyclopaedia of Chess Openings code
- Tsogo languages, coded B30 in the Guthrie classification of Bantu languages
- Volvo B30, an automotive petrol engine produced by Volvo from 1968
