= Mengo =

Mengo can refer to:

- Mengo, Uganda
  - Mengo Hospital
  - Mengo Senior School
- Clube de Regatas do Flamengo
- Letin Mengo, an electric car
- Mengo Yokoyari, Manga artist
