= CO1 =

CO1 may refer to:

- CO postcode area
- Conway group Co1 in mathematics
- Carbon monoxide in chemistry
- Cytochrome Oxidase Subunit 1
- Min'an Electric CO1, a vehicle made by Min'an Electric
