= Lichi (car brand) =

Chinese automobile manufacturer

- Type: Private
- Industry: Automotive
- Founded: January 2011; 15 years ago
- Headquarters: Dezhou, Shandong, China
- Number of employees: 1,500
- Website: en.lichi-cn.com

Lichi (Chinese: 丽驰) is a Chinese automobile manufacturer headquartered in Dezhou, China, it is a low-speed electric vehicle company that specializes in producing neighborhood electric vehicles.

== History ==
Lichi was founded in January 2011, and is based in Dezhou. Lichi said their mission is, "To create the world's first brand of the fashionable electric vehicle and provide the common people with affordable, high-end and fashionable electric vehicle reaching the standard of low-carbon and eco-friendly."

Lichi took part in the 4.5 MW solar project, which is designed to reduce approximately 3,929 tons of CO_{2}, 1.86 tons of SO_{2} and 6,213 tons of water consumption each year.

So far, Lichi has announced partnerships with only Xiaopeng, which they have been working together since 2017.

Lichi produced the A01 in 2013. It has 3 doors and only 2 seats. Its dimensions measure 2250 mm/1399 mm/1634 mm, with a top speed of 50 kilometres. In China, it costs 46.800 yuan. It has been criticized by users because of its small size, making it unsafe if in a car crash. It takes 6 hours to fully charge. It includes Central Lock, Remote Key, Radio and Blue-tooth, and Anti-slip Slope Control, as well as a 7-inch display system.

The Lichi B01 also came out in 2013. The B01 is a 3 doored hatchback microcar.

The L17 is a 5 doored, 3 wheeled vehicle. It was Lichi's third production vehicle.

Lichi's fourth production vehicle was the S350. It has 5 doors and could seat 4 people. It is also classified as a microcar, and is known as China's Smart Fortwo.

== Vehicles ==
=== Current models ===
Lichi currently has 5 production vehicles.

Model	Photo	Specifications
Lichi A01		Body style: Hatchback Class: microcar Doors: 3 Seats: 2 Battery: 48V electric motor Production: 2013–present Revealed: 2013
Lichi B01		Body style: Hatchback Class: microcar Doors: 3 Seats: Battery: Production: 2013–present Revealed: 2013
Lichi L17		Body style: 3-wheeled car Class: microcar Doors: 5 Seats: Battery: Production: Revealed:
Lichi S350		Body style: Hatchback Class: microcar Doors: 5 Seats: 4 Battery: Production: Revealed:

== See also ==
- Leapmotor
- Min'an Electric
- Sinogold
- Bordrin
