= Sinogold GM3 =

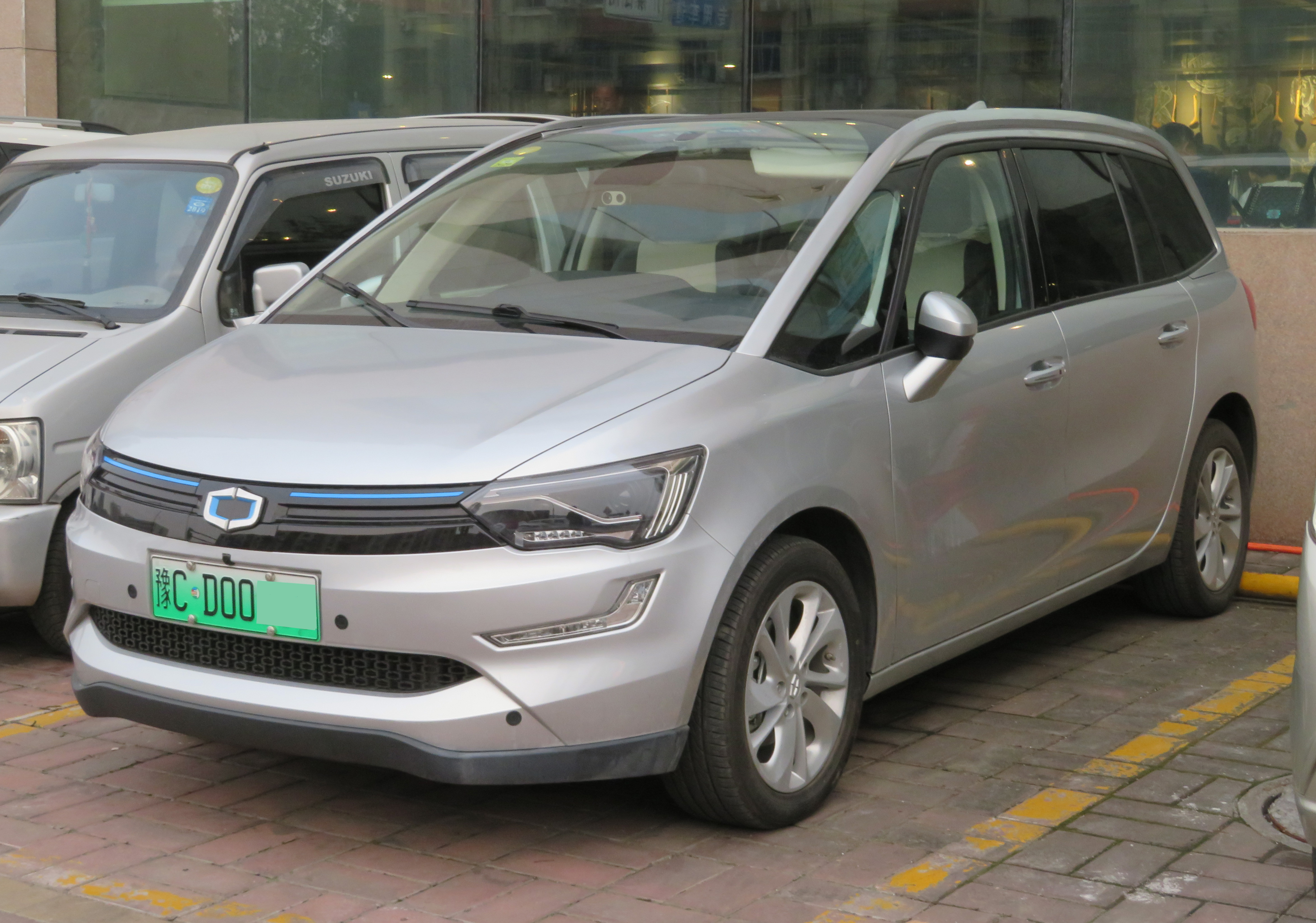

Overview
- Manufacturer: Sinogold
- Also called: Sinogold G60
- Production: 2018–2023
- Assembly: China: Shandong

Body and chassis
- Class: Compact MPV (M)
- Body style: 5-door minivan
- Layout: Front-engine, front-wheel drive

Dimensions
- Wheelbase: 2,840 mm (111.8 in)
- Length: 4,615 mm (181.7 in)
- Width: 1,845 mm (72.6 in)
- Height: 1,655 mm (65.2 in)

The Sinogold GM3 is an electric compact multi-purpose vehicle (MPV) produced from 2018 to 2023 by Chinese manufacturer Sinogold.

== Overview ==
Sinogold is a state-owned electric vehicle manufacturer based in China's Shandong Province, and the GM3 is their first passenger car. The Sinogold GM3 is a six-seater MPV with a 2-2-2 seating configuration. Prices of the GM3 ranges from 229,800 yuan to 249,800 yuan.

=== Controversies ===
The body style of the Sinogold GM3 caused controversy due to its striking resemblance to the China minivan Citroën Grand C4 Picasso. Apart from the same shape of the body, doors, windows and trunk lid, the wheelbase is the same.

=== Technical data ===
The electrical system in Sinogold SM3 consists of a battery with a capacity of 55 kWh, which, together with the electric motor, develops a power of 161 HP and 250 Nm of maximum torque. The maximum speed of the vehicle is 150 km/h, and the range on one charge is approximately 350 kilometers.

== Specifications ==
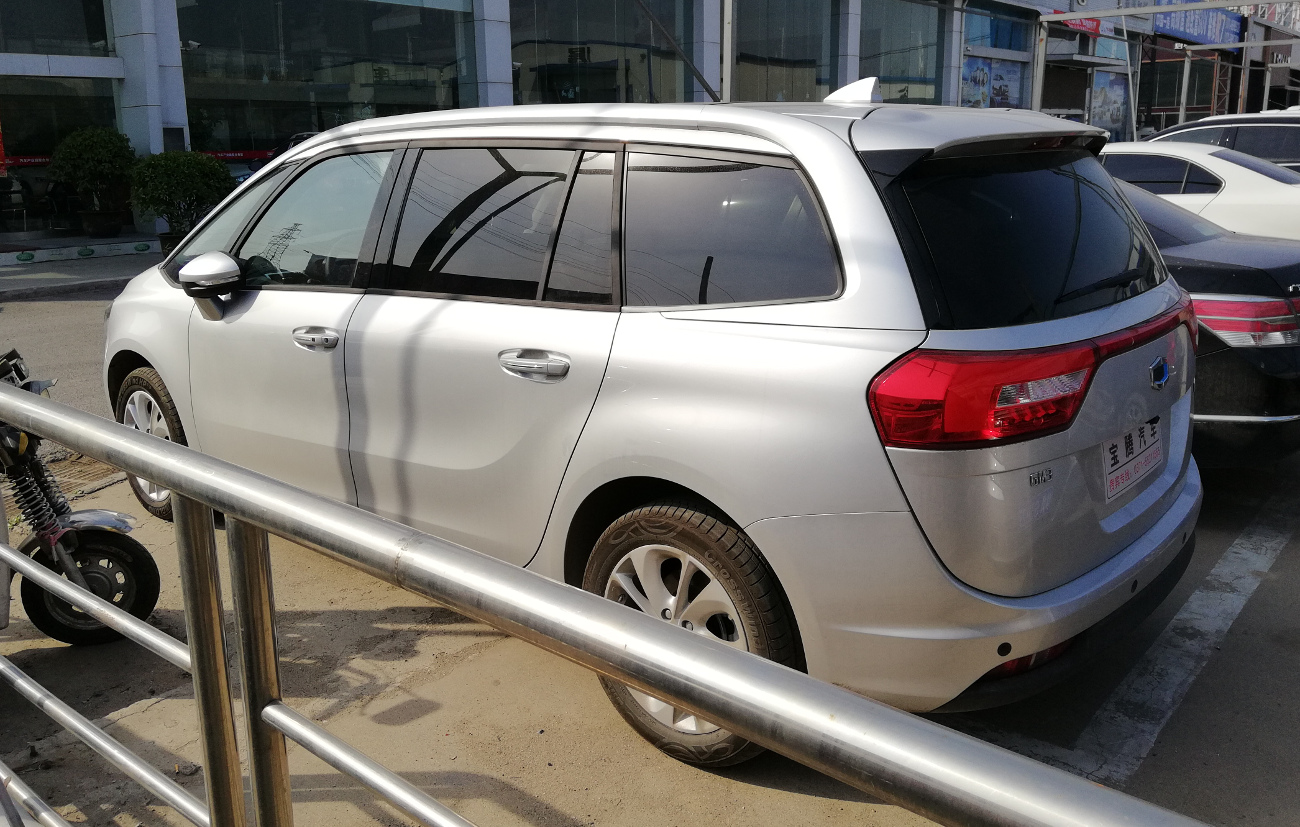
Sinogold GM3 rear quarter view

The Sinogold GM3 is powered by an electric motor positioned above the front axle with an output of 163 hp and 250 Nm of torque. The range of the Sinogold GM3 depends on the battery options, with 300 kilometers for the 55 kWh battery and 405 kilometers for the 66 kWh battery (NEDC). According to Sinogold, driving with an average speed of 60 km/h can extend the range to 400 kilometer for the 55 kWh battery and to 520 kilometers for the 66 kWh battery. Fully charging the Sinogold GM3 takes 8 hours on a 220V power source or 40 minutes with a fast charger for 80% of the battery charged.

== Styling controversies ==
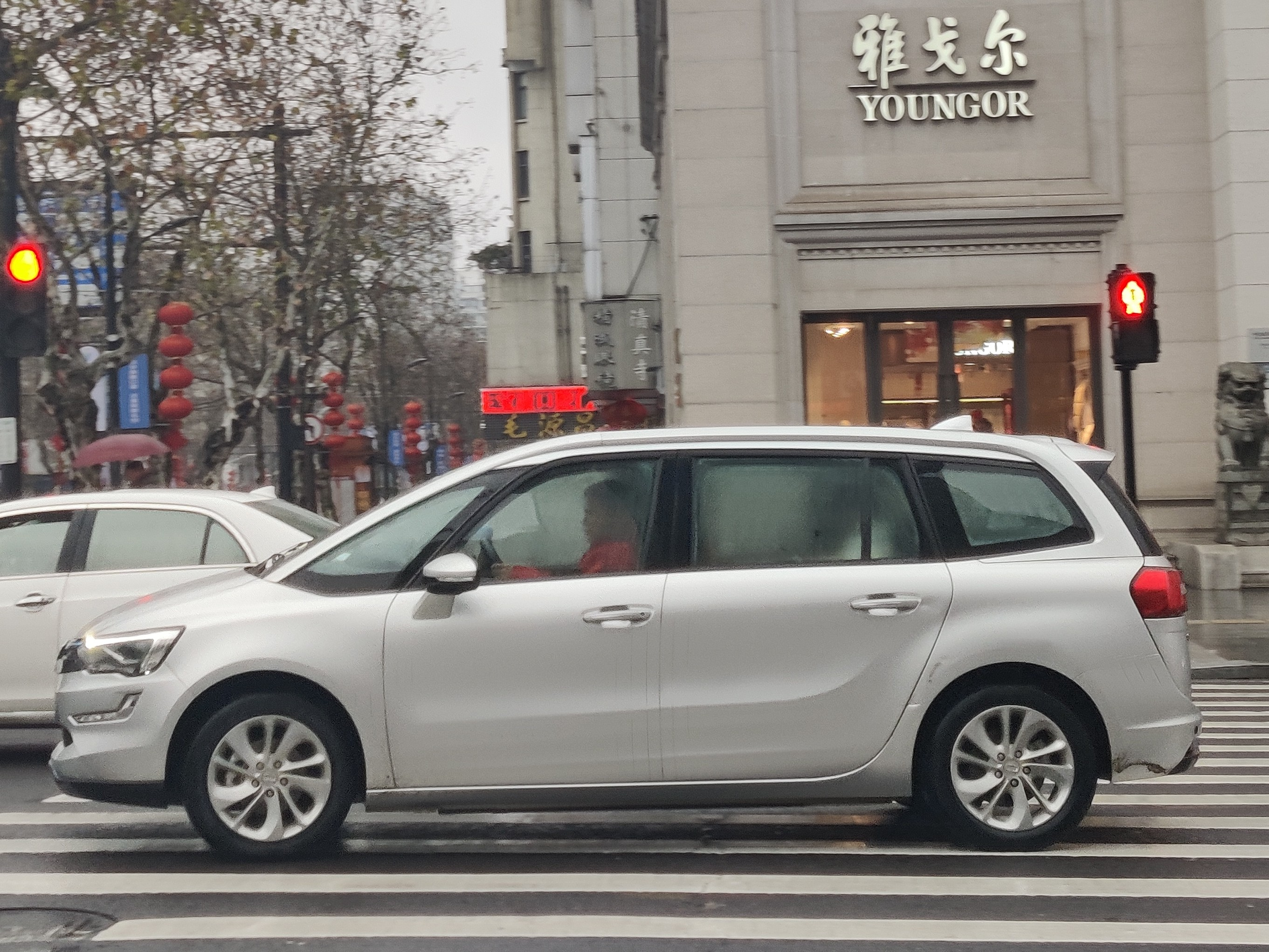
Sinogold GM3 side view heavily resembling the Citroën Grand C4 Picasso

Originally called the Sinogold G60, the Sinogold GM3 is a controversial vehicle from the styling aspect, as most of the exterior design is an obvious copy of the Citroën Grand C4 Picasso despite the redesigned front and rear down road graphics. As of May 2017, Sinogold was caught using a photoshopped image of the Citroën Grand C4 Picasso for the picture of the Sinogold GM3.

== See also ==
- Citroën Grand C4 Picasso - The car that inspired the styling of the Sinogold GM3
