= Techrules Ren =

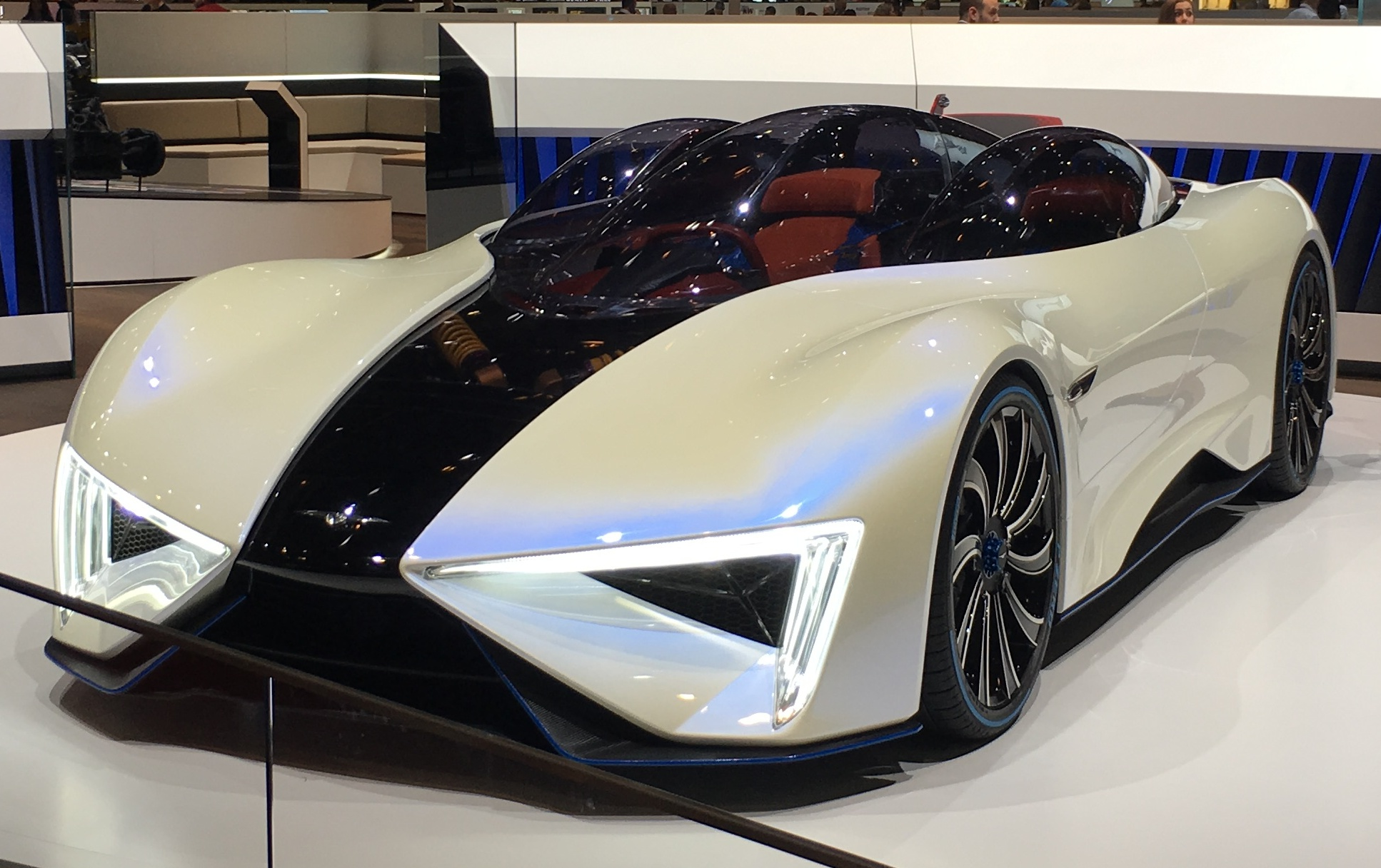
- Techrules Ren at the 2018 Geneva Motor Show

Overview
- Manufacturer: Techrules
- Production: 2018–present
- Designer: GFG Style

Body and chassis
- Class: Sports car (S)
- Body style: 1-door coupé
- Layout: MR layout (two motors); M4 layout (four or six-motors)
- Doors: Canopy doors

Powertrain
- Engine: One or two 30 kW turbines Two 80 kW turbines
- Electric motor: Two, four, or six electric motors (160 kW (215 hp; 218 PS) each)
- Power output: 429 hp (320 kW; 435 PS); 858 hp (640 kW; 870 PS); 1,287 hp (960 kW; 1,305 PS)
- Battery: 14 kWh, 25 kWh, or 32 kWh lithium-ion
- Range: 1,243 mi (2,000 km)
- Electric range: 124 mi (200 km)

Dimensions
- Wheelbase: 2,723.5 mm (107 in)
- Length: 4,694 mm (185 in)
- Width: 2,048 mm (81 in)
- Height: 1,200 mm (47 in)
- Curb weight: 1,630 kg (3,594 lb)

The Techrules Ren (stylized Techrules REN) is a single-door, high-performance sports car manufactured by Techrules, and designed by Fabrizio Giugiaro and Giorgetto Giugiaro of GFG Style. At its launch, it will become the first sports car to contain a turbine engine. This is also the first production sports car from Techrules. Expectations for the vehicle's construction are 10 (hand-built) per year.

The car was successfully tested at the Circuit de Spa-Francorchamps and Autodromo Nazionale Monza race tracks with no damage and harm.

== Choice of name ==
Ren is the first of five values that every Chinese person is born with to contribute to the society, and means humanity and kindness.

== Vehicle design ==
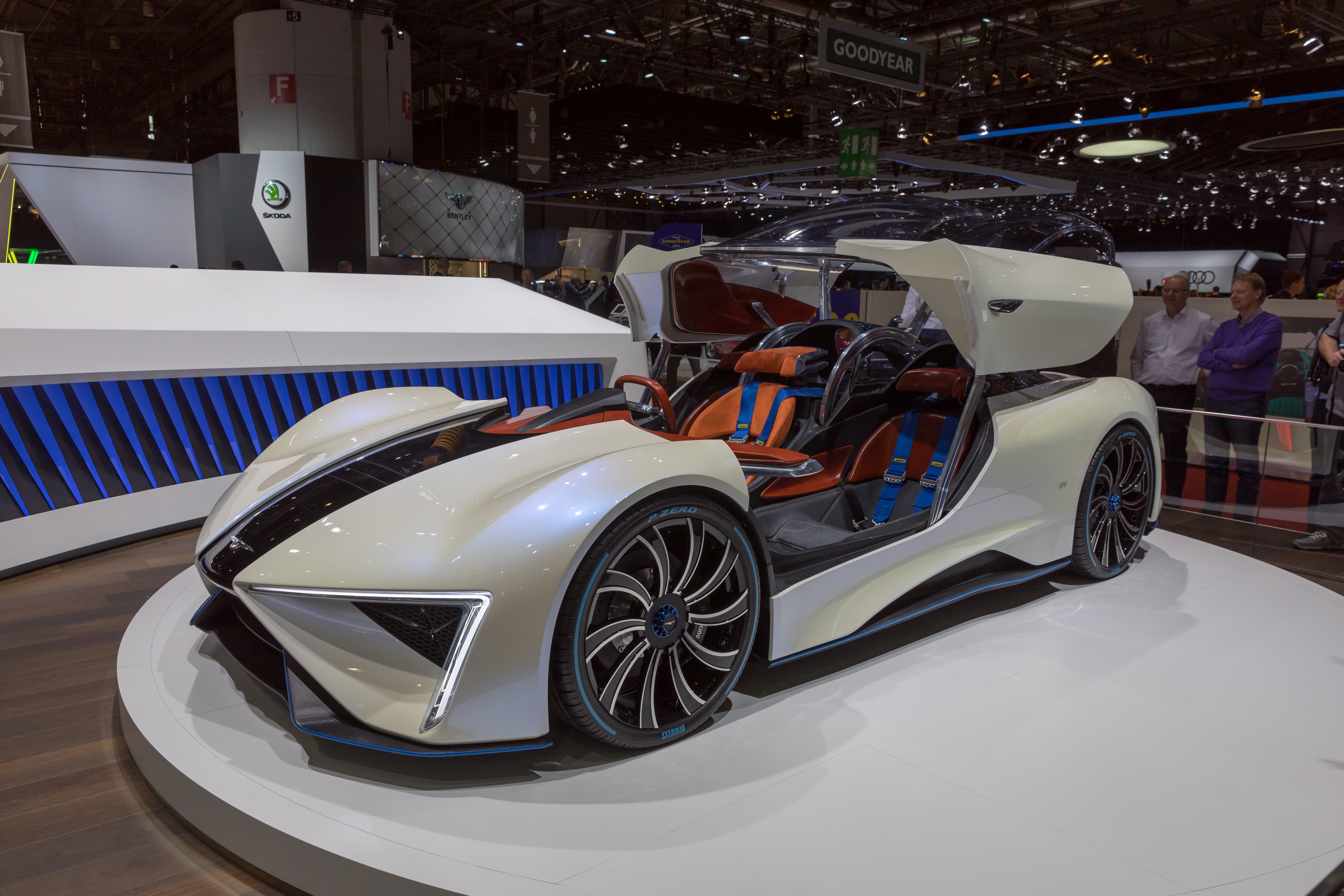
Front view with the door open

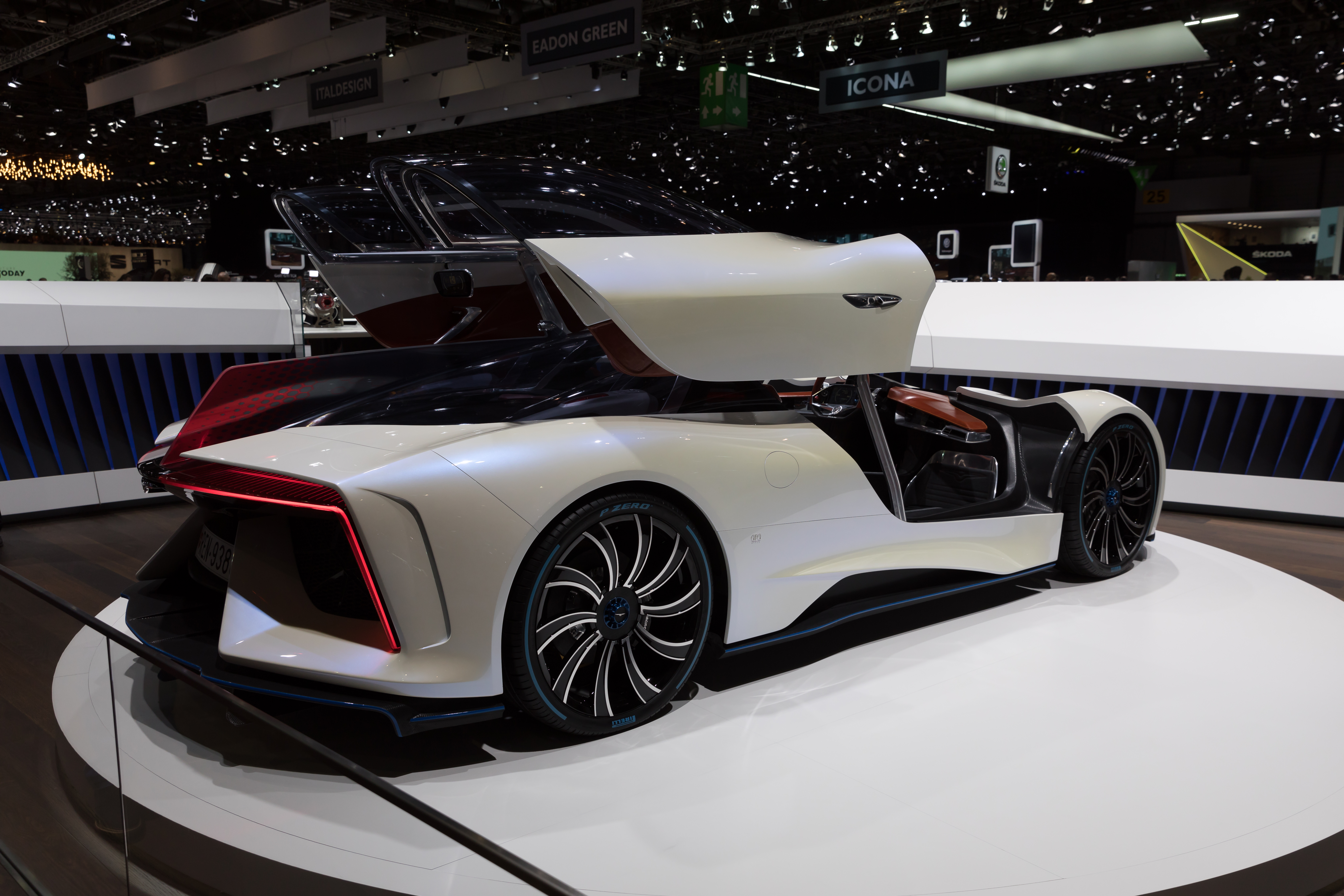
Rear view with the door open

The exterior design was inspired by aerospace engineering, with the inclusion of a rear fin, and a cockpit-like cabin. The cockpit cabin will differ, depending on the number of chosen seats, from one to three. The chassis design was designed by L.M. Gianetti. The interior slightly represents the British-built sports car, the McLaren F1, with the inclusion of three seats, but this is only if the customer has chosen the option of three front seating. The interior also contains a denim material for the seats, which is constructed by high-end Italian clothing company, PT Pantaloni Torino.

The exterior, interior, and chassis designs were each designed by the team of Fabrizio and Giorgetto Giugiaro and company L.M. Gianetti.

== Ren vehicle data ==
=== Specifications ===
The Ren is powered by a turbine and a lithium-ion electric motor, but there are three specification options, making the setups different. The option for a turbine–electric motor combination was, according to CEO Matthew Jin, to make the conversion process of freeing the combustion engine to convert chemical energy into mechanical energy more efficient.

There are three specification options. The first one contains the turbine and two electric motors, which does 429 hp (320 kW; 435 PS) and 575 lb⋅ft (780 N⋅m), which means the power-to-weight ratio sits at 252 hp (188 kW; 255 PS) per ton. This makes the car rear-wheel drive only. The second includes a turbine and four motors that boasts 858 hp (640 kW; 870 PS) and 1,150 lb⋅ft (1,559 N⋅m), making the power-to-weight ratio at 504 hp (376 kW; 511 PS). The second setup makes the car all-wheel drive. The range (both turbine and electric motor, with diesel) is at 1,243 mi (2,000 km) with 80 litres of fuel. The electric range is 124 mi (200 km). The car can achieve 31 MPG. Electric motor lifespan stands at 100,000 cycles, which makes the battery longevity something to be less worried about.

The weight is set at 1,630 kg (3,594 lb). The chassis was built in carbon-fiber material, with an aluminum bulkhead rear.

The AP Racing brakes are carbon ceramic discs, in which are coupled with six-piston calipers front and rear. The suspension uses a horizontally adjustable coil-over shock setup.

=== Performance ===
The Ren can accelerate from 0–60 mph (0–97 km/h) in 3.0 seconds and can attain a top speed of 199 mph (320 km/h).

== Ren RS vehicle data ==
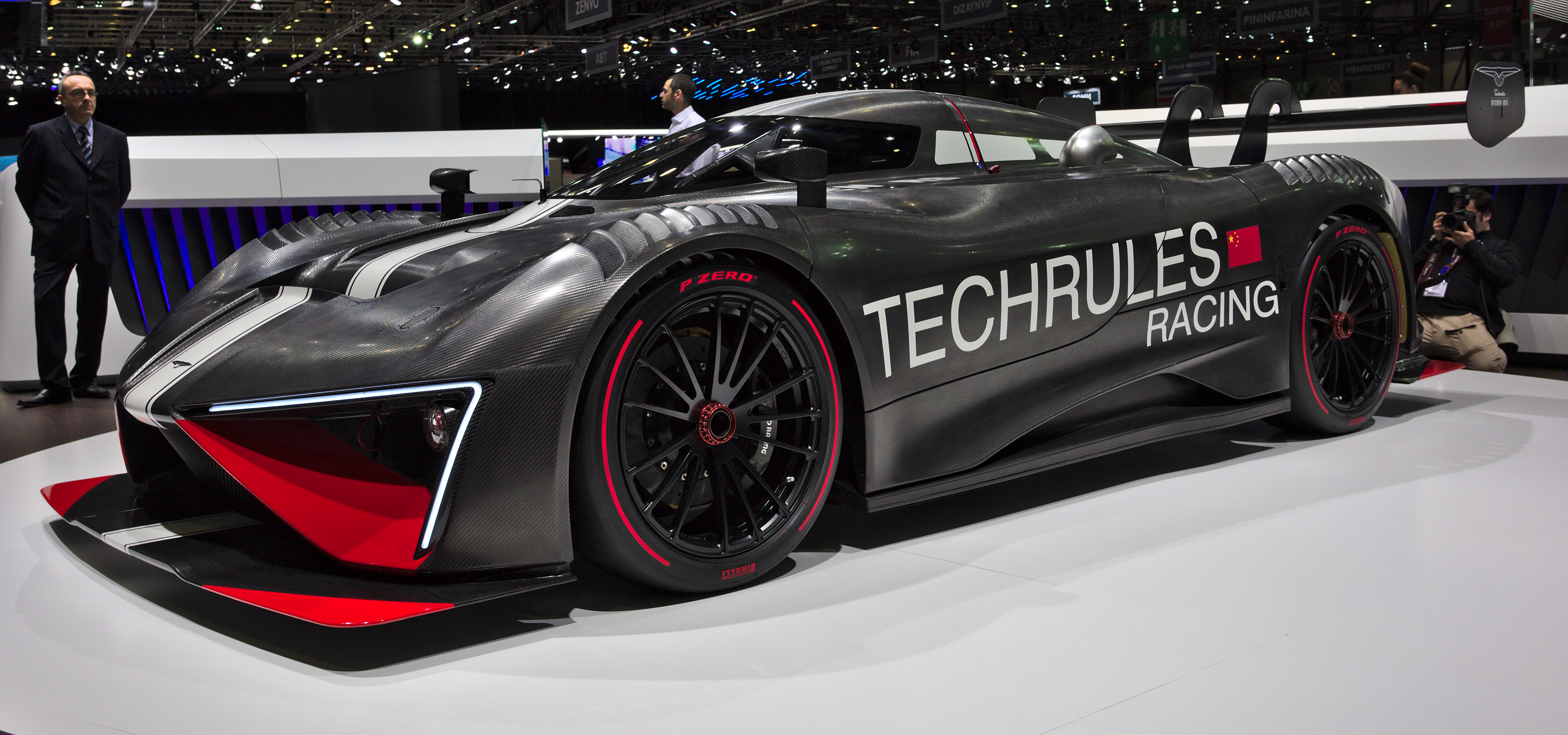
Ren RS

=== Specifications ===
The hardcore, track-only variant of the Ren, the Techrules Ren RS, was unveiled at the Geneva Motor Show alongside its road-oriented sibling. The powertrain of the Ren RS is the final setup/option, which has the turbine and six motors, this time pushing up to 1,287 hp (960 kW; 1,305 PS) and 1,725 lb⋅ft (2,339 N⋅m), leaving the power-to-weight ratio at 757 hp (564 kW; 767 PS) per ton, more than the most powerful version of the street-legal version. As with the most powerful powertrain of the street-legal version, the Ren RS is all-wheel drive. At the most potent form, the Ren RS can offer a wheel torque as high as 5,737 lb⋅ft (7,778 N⋅m) of wheel torque.

=== Performance ===
The Ren RS can accelerate from 0–60 mph (0–97 km/h) in 2.5 seconds, and can attain a top speed of 205 mph (330 km/h), 6 mph (10 km/h) faster than the road-legal counterpart.

== In media ==
Because turbines have always been a very inefficient way to convert chemical energy into useful, wheel-turning mechanical energy, only a few have tried to use a turbine in the powertrain system, and none have ever succeeded commercially. But, with electric vehicles, an electric motor is used to drive the wheels, which effectively frees the combustion engine to exclusively convert chemical energy into mechanical energy and finally into electric energy. This is a major breakthrough, making it possible for us to use the highly efficient turbine engine as a superb range extender on our vehicles.

— CEO Matthew Jin

- The car was questioned of its use of the turbine engine in an interview with CEO Matthew Jin and Autocar. He explained that this was to make the conversion of freeing the combustion engine to convert chemical energy into mechanical energy be more efficient.
- The car was also featured in the 2017 Concorso d'Eleganza Villa d'Este.
