= SiTech DEV1 =

Battery electric city car

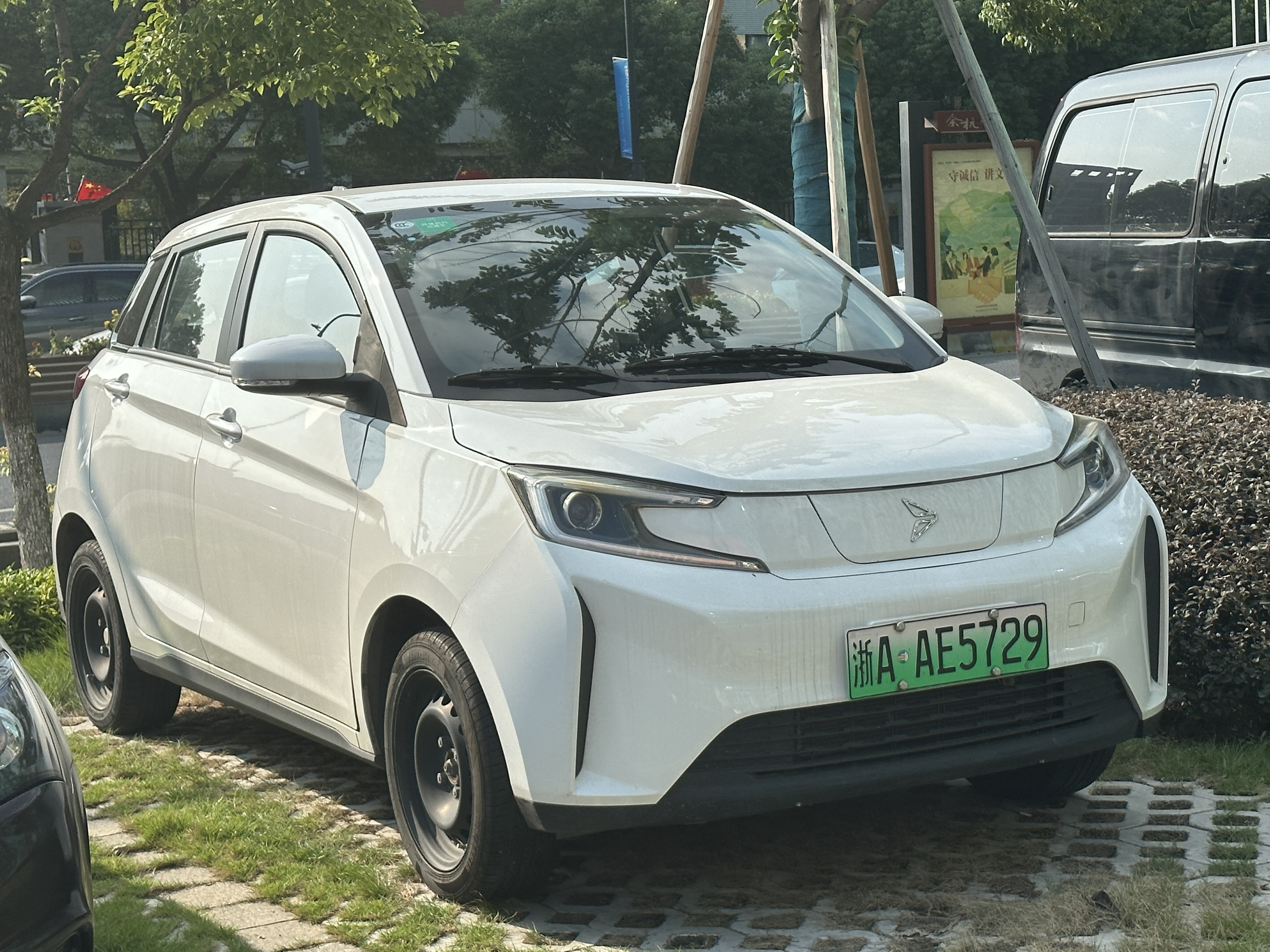

Overview
- Manufacturer: FAW-SiTech
- Also called: Diandongwu Young Guangxiaoxin (电动屋 Young光小新); Link Tour Yue01 (领途悦01)
- Production: 2018–2026
- Assembly: China

Body and chassis
- Class: City car (A)
- Body style: 5-door hatchback
- Layout: Front-engine, front-wheel-drive

Dimensions
- Wheelbase: 2,415 mm (95.1 in)
- Length: 3,735 mm (147.0 in)
- Width: 1,655 mm (65.2 in)
- Height: 1,550 mm (61.0 in)
- Curb weight: 1,120 kg (2,469 lb)

The SiTech DEV1 is a battery electric city car produced by the Chinese manufacturer FAW under their electric vehicle brand SiTech (Xinte, 新特).

== History ==
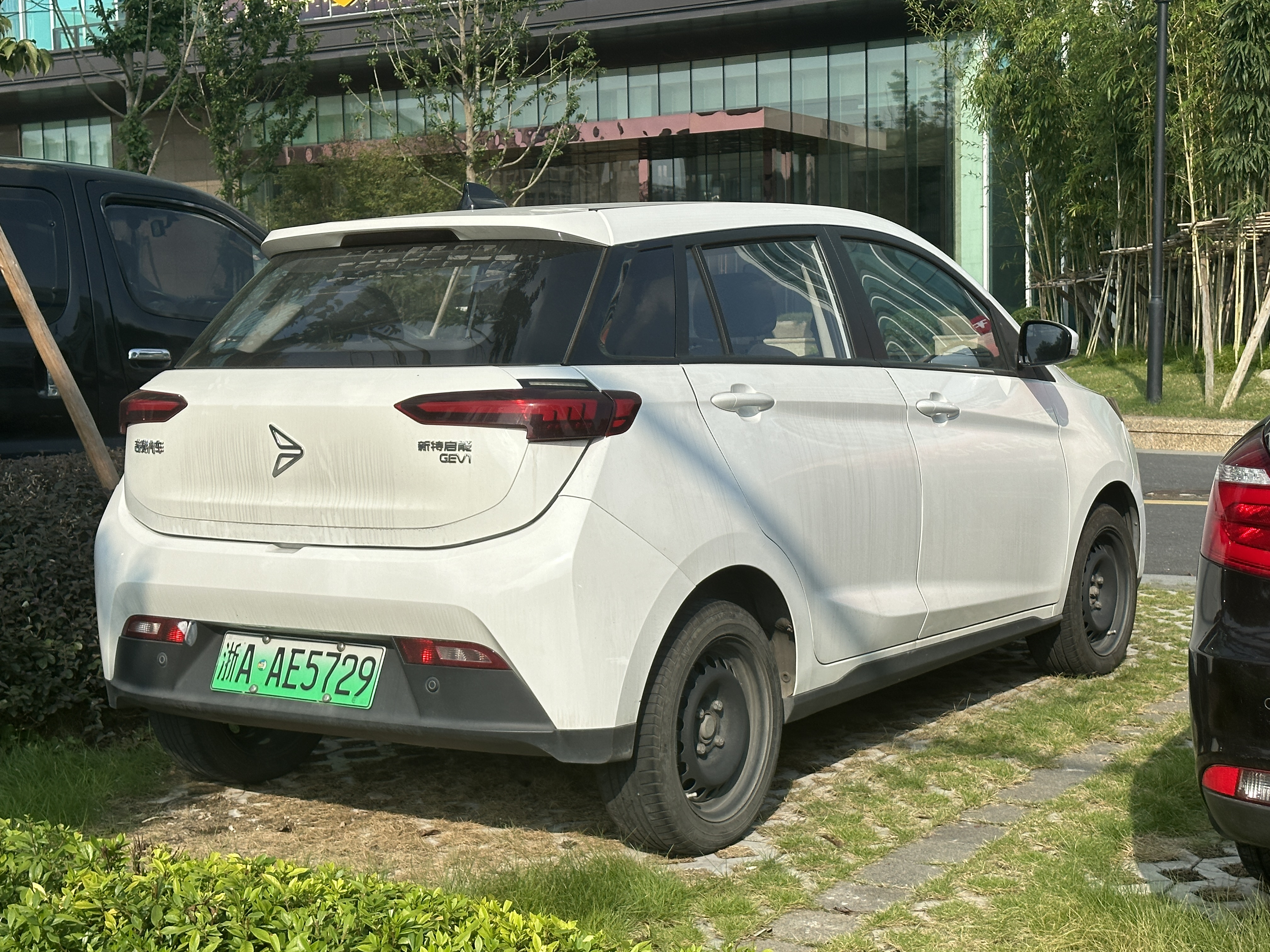
Rear view

The public debut for the DEV1 was during the 2018 Beijing Auto Show and it was launched in the Chinese car market in Q3, 2018.

Prices of the DEV1 electric city car in 2018 ranged from 139,900 yuan to 164,900 yuan.

== Description ==
The DEV1 is powered by a 55 kW electric motor that generates 170 Nm of torque, with a top speed of 100 km/h (62 mph). It is a 5-door hatchback with four seats. The battery of the DEV1 is capable of a range of 350 kilometers, and charging takes 40 minutes for 80% of battery charge. The charging port is located at the center front of the car. DEV1 can be charged in about 5.5 hours through a 6.6 kW onboard charger or a Wallbox at home or through public chargers the size of the onboard charger. However, the DEV1 can be charged from empty to 80% in around 40 minutes by charging at a fast-charging station.

== Link Tour Yue01 ==
The Link Tour Yue01 (领途悦01) is a restyled variant of the DEV1 produced by Link Tour. Link Tour is a brand introduced by Link Tour Holdings, the joint venture between Yogomo and Great Wall Motor.
