= Techrules AT96 =

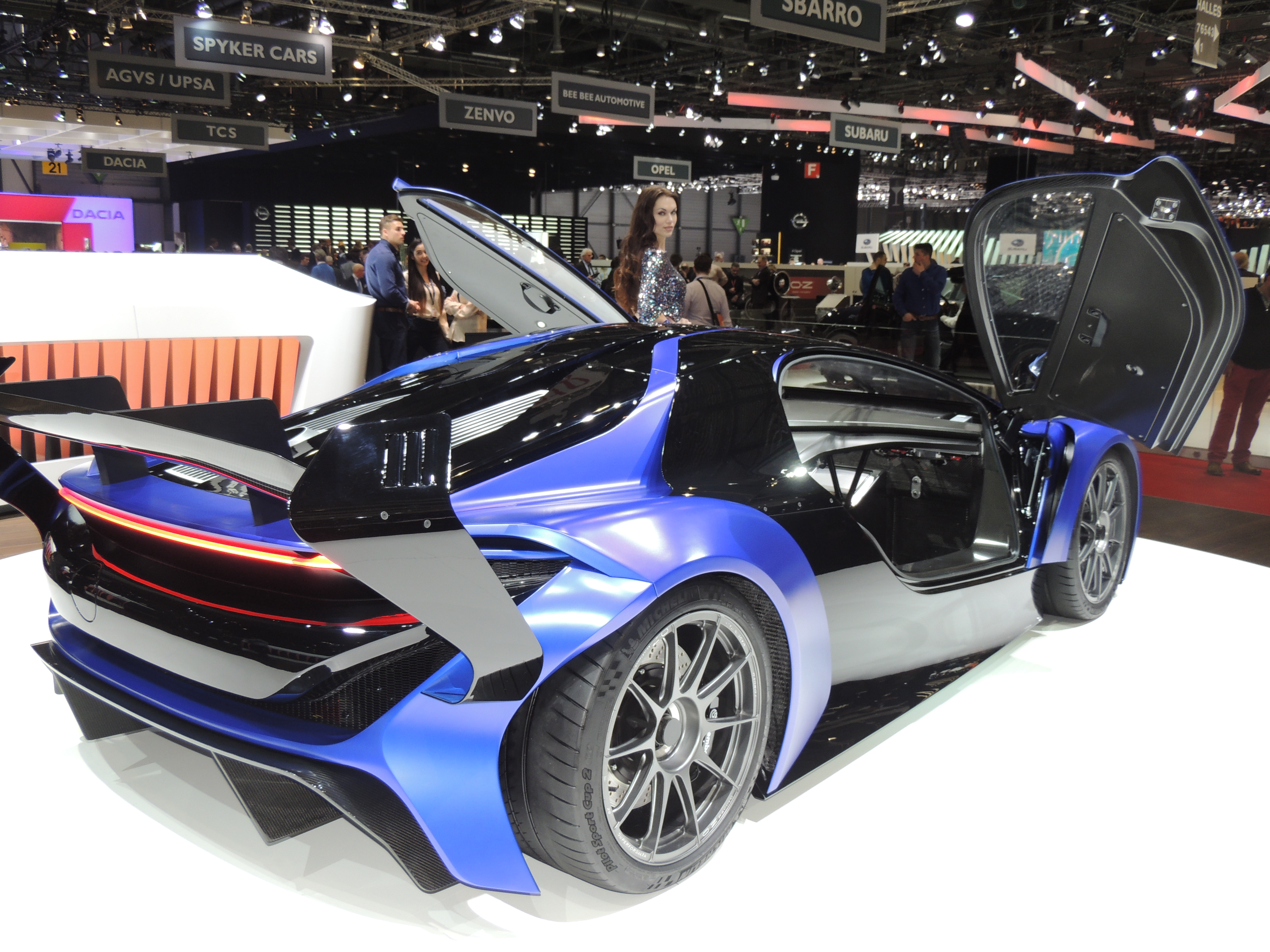
- The AT96 at the 2016 Geneva Motor Show

Overview
- Manufacturer: Techrules
- Production: 2016

Body and chassis
- Class: Electric sports concept car (S)
- Body style: 2-door coupe
- Doors: Two scissor doors

The Techrules AT96 is an electric sports car made by Techrules. Unlike most electric cars, it uses a multi-fuel (jet fuel, kerosene, natural gas, biogas) aviation turbine to charge the batteries. It has 1030 horsepower and 6372 lb-ft (8369 nm) of torque, a 0–60 mph (0–97 km/h) time of 2.5 seconds, and a top speed of 218 mph (351 km/h).

The Techrules GT96 variant uses a turbine limited to its gas fuels.

The car appears and features in the 2013 racing game Asphalt 8: Airborne, and the 2018 racing game Asphalt 9: Legends.
