= SiTech =

Chinese automobile manufacturer

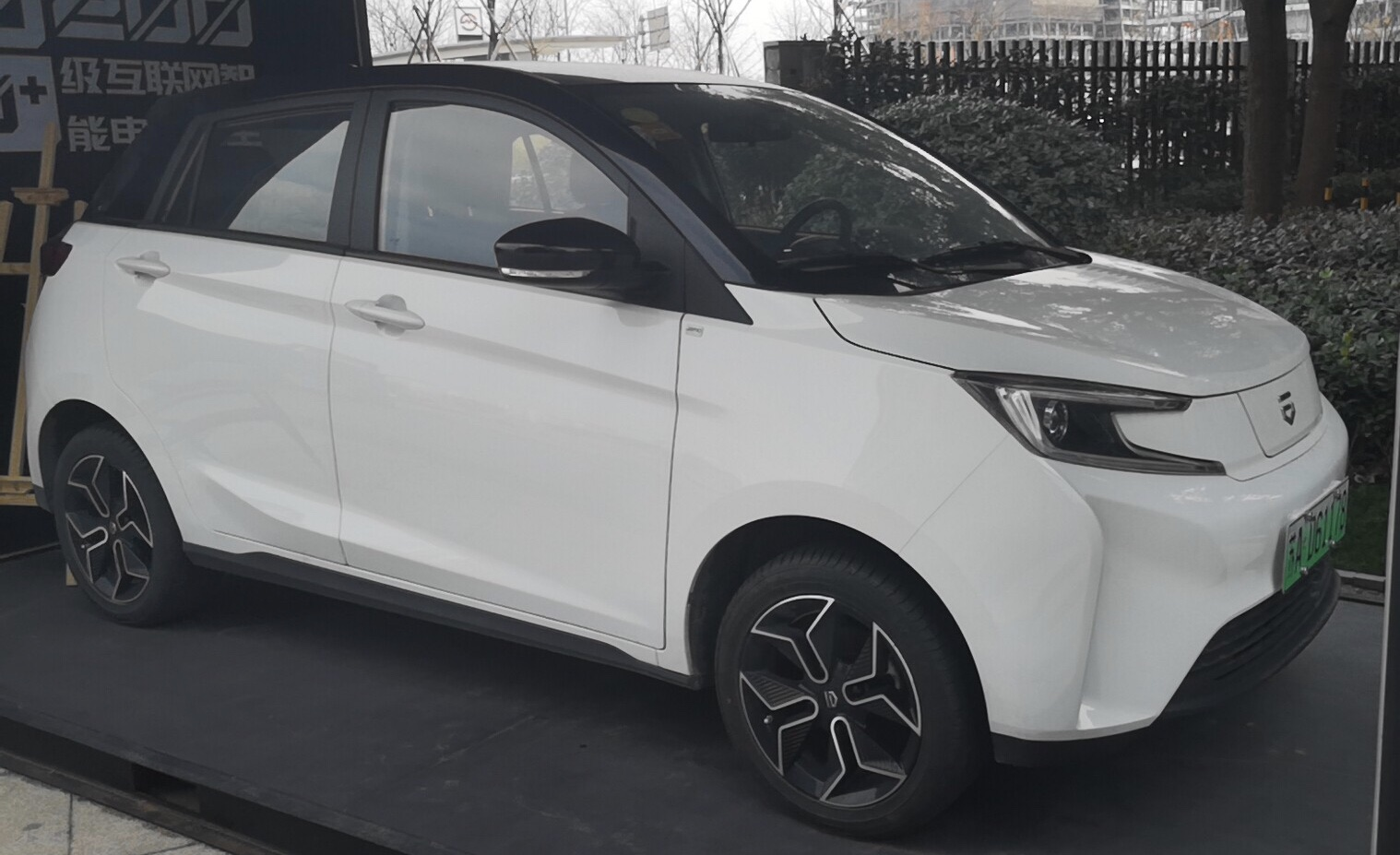
- Type: Private
- Industry: Automotive
- Founded: 2018; 8 years ago
- Defunct: 2020
- Successor: EV House
- Headquarters: Changchun, China
- Divisions: Gyon
- Website: www.sitechdev.com

SiTech (Chinese: 新特), also known as Xinte Auto (电动屋), is a Chinese automobile manufacturer headquartered in Changchun, China, that specializes in producing electric vehicles. Gyon is a luxury sub-division of SiTech.

== History ==
In April 2018, during the Beijing Auto Show, the Chinese automotive conglomerate FAW Group presented a new brand intended for the production and sale of urban electric cars. SiTech was created as a response to local initiatives such as Dearcc and Ora. The first SiTech model was the DEV1 small hatchback, which, after its premiere in the spring of 2018, went on sale in the third quarter that year, was intended exclusively for the Chinese domestic market. In January 2019, the manufacturer managed to sell the first 4,000 units of the DEV1. However, the company's results did not meet long-term expectations, and disappeared from the market after only 2 years at the end of 2020, and the SiTech DEV1 was transferred to the EV House brand.

== Vehicles ==
=== Current models ===
SiTech currently has three production vehicles.

| Model | Photo | Specifications |
|---|---|---|
| SiTech DEV1 | | Body style: Hatchback Class: A Doors: 5 Seats: 4 Battery: 35 kWh Production: 2018–present Revealed: 2018 Beijing Auto Show |
| SiTech MEV | | Body style: Sedan Class: Doors: 4 Seats: 5 Battery: 51 kWh Production: 2020 Revealed: 2020 |
| SiTech AEVS | | Body style: Hatchback Class: Doors: 5 Seats: 4 Battery: Production: 2018–2020 Revealed: 2020 |

== Sales ==
SiTech sold 300,000 units from 2019 to 2020.
