= Bestune B30 =

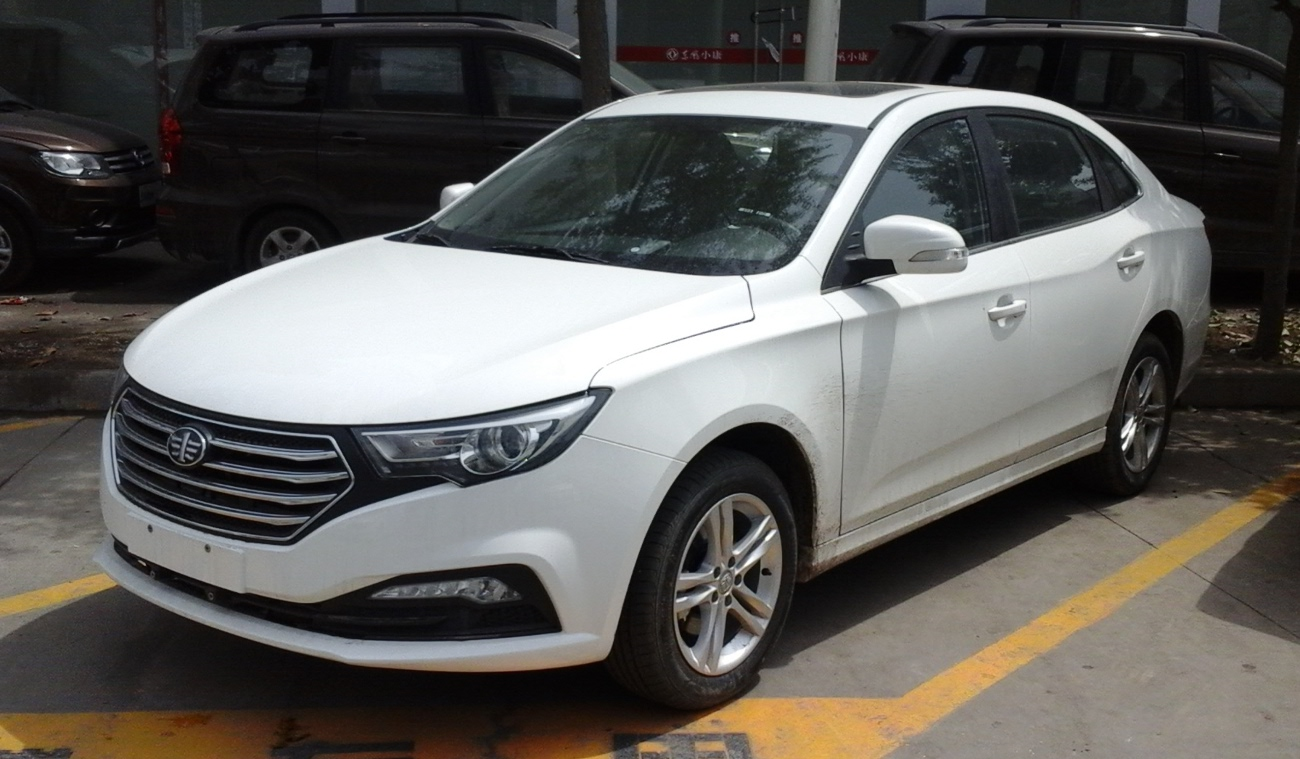
- Bestune B30

Overview
- Manufacturer: FAW Group - Bestune
- Also called: Besturn B30; SiTech MEV; SiTech MEV100
- Production: 2015–2020
- Assembly: Changchun, China; Tehran, Iran (Bahman Group)

Body and chassis
- Class: Compact car (C)
- Body style: 4-door saloon
- Layout: Front engine, front-wheel-drive

Powertrain
- Engine: 1.6 L CA4GB16 I4
- Transmission: 5 speed manual; 6 speed automatic

Dimensions
- Wheelbase: 2,630 mm (104 in)
- Length: 4,625 mm (182 in) (4-door)
- Width: 1,790 mm (70 in)
- Height: 1,500 mm (59 in)

The Bestune B30 (formerly Besturn B30) is a compact sedan produced by the FAW Group under the Bestune brand.

== Overview ==
The Besturn B30 was launched on the Chinese car market in November 2015 with prices ranging from 72,800 yuan to 92,800 yuan. The Besturn B30 was previewed by a concept car during the 2015 Shanghai Auto Show named the Besturn A-Class concept, as in the A-class segment of the Chinese car market equivalent to the B-segment in foreign markets or subcompact cars. The final production version of the B30 debuted on the 2015 Chengdu Auto Show in September 2015, with the market launch in November 2015.

The Besturn B30 is powered by a 1.6-litre DOHC inline-4 engine producing 109 hp and 155Nm. The transmission is a 6-speed automatic transmission.

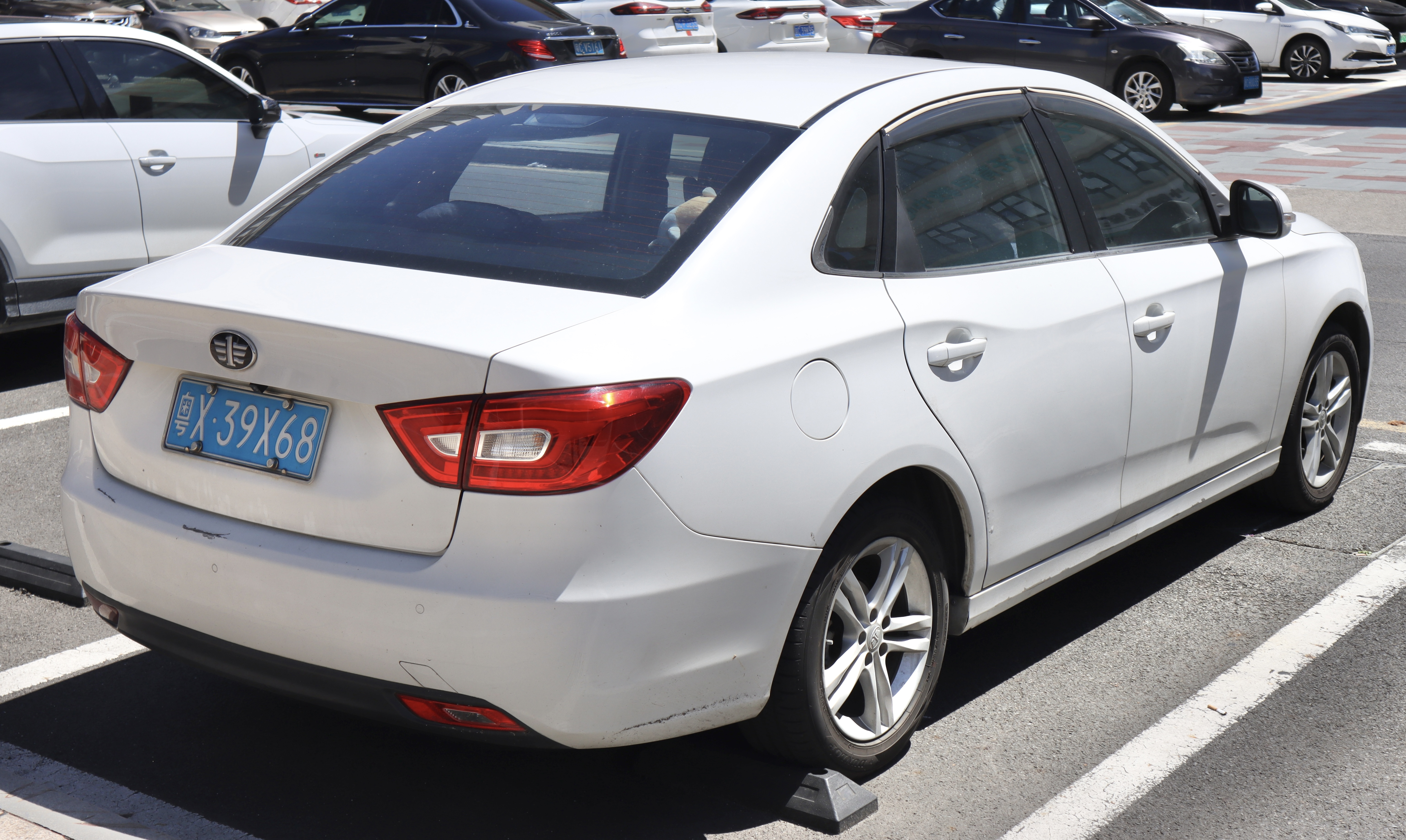
Rear quarter view

The FAW Besturn brand also launched a Besturn B30 Concept during the Shanghai Auto Show in 2011 previewing a small family car under FAW's Besturn brand based on the Volkswagen Jetta/ Bora named the Besturn C30 sedan.

== SiTech MEV ==
The SiTech MEV is the second vehicle of SiTech, which came out in 2020. It is an electric vehicle based on the Bestune B30 sedan with dimensions of 4632 mm/1790 mm/1500 mm, with a wheelbase of 2652 mm, and a weight of 1463 kg. It has a range of 402 km, and is powered by a 51 kWh battery. The MEV comes in the 60 edition, 70 edition, 80 edition, 90 edition, and the 100 edition. The MEV100 is a model jointly manufactured by SiTech and FAW. The SiTech MEV100 is essentially a rebadged Bestune B30 with the overall design based on the B30.
