= Letin Mengo =

Chinese electric mini-car

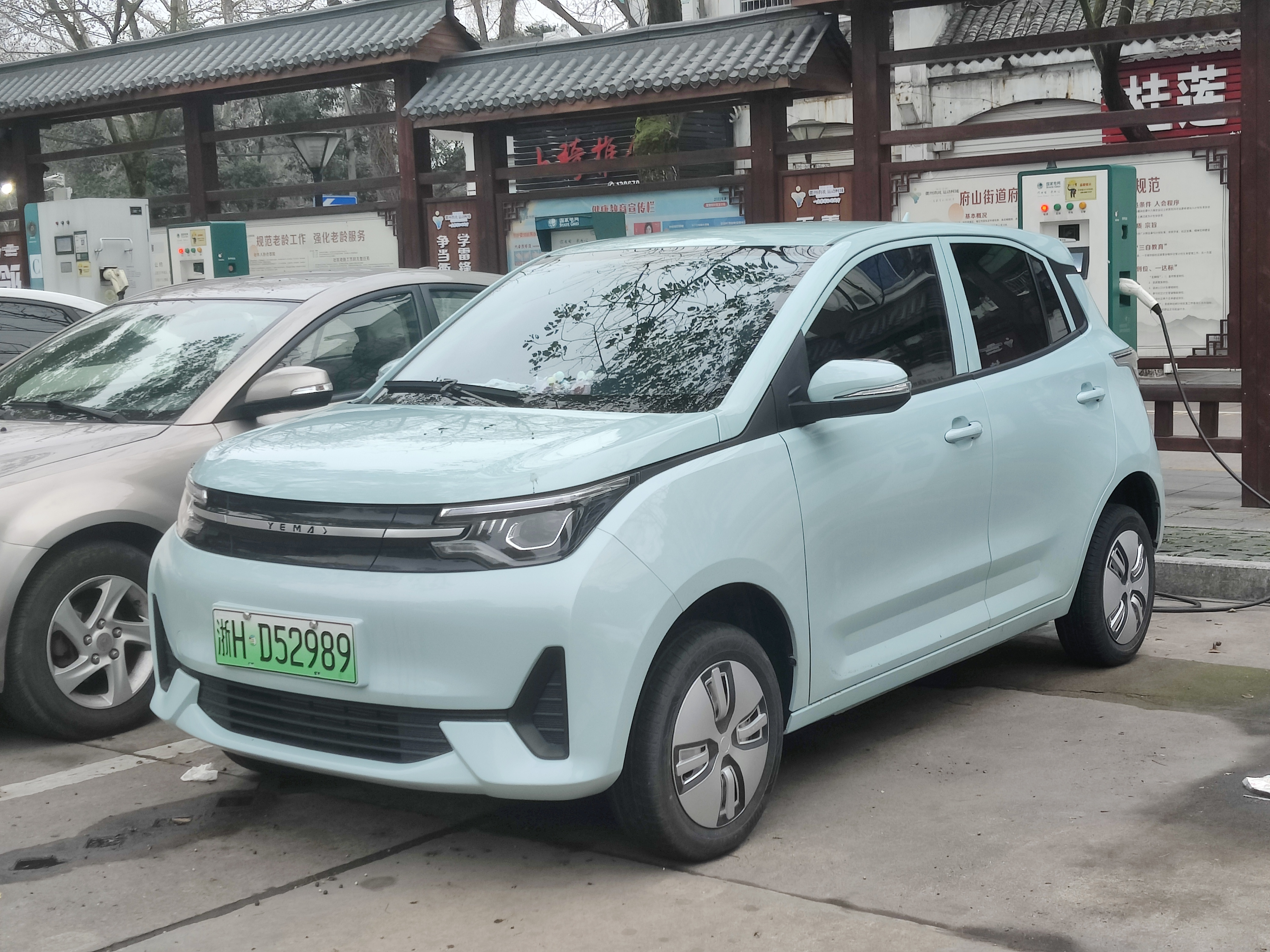

Overview
- Manufacturer: Levdeo
- Also called: Letin Mengo Pro; SEV E-WAN (2023, Mexico)
- Production: 2020–2023
- Assembly: China

Body and chassis
- Class: City car
- Body style: 5-door hatchback; 3-door hatchback
- Layout: Rear-motor, rear-wheel-drive Front-motor, front-wheel-drive

Powertrain
- Electric motor: Permanent magnet synchronous
- Power output: 25–35 kW (34–47 hp; 34–48 PS)
- Transmission: 1-speed direct-drive
- Battery: Li-ion battery: 11.52 kWh; 17.28 kWh; 29.44 kWh
- Electric range: 130–300 km (81–186 mi)

Dimensions
- Wheelbase: 2,442 mm (96.1 in)
- Length: 3,622 mm (142.6 in)
- Width: 1,607 mm (63.3 in)
- Height: 1,925 mm (75.8 in)
- Curb weight: 665 kg (1,466 lb)

The Letin Mengo (Chinese: 雷丁 芒果) was a battery electric city car manufactured by Levdeo under the Letin Brand from 2020 to 2023. Sales began in China in April 2021 with prices starting at Chinese Yuan 29,800 RMB.

== Overview ==
The Letin Mengo can seat up to 4 occupants and supports 5G connectivity, AR navigation, equips a thermostatic battery system and allows users to choose different wheel sizes. Letin is a brand launched by Levdeo, originally a company that started with low-speed electric vehicles, and in 2018 Levdeo acquired Qinxing Auto to enter the commercial vehicle segment. Later in early 2019, Levdeo acquired Yema Auto to obtain a passenger car production qualification and enter the new energy passenger car segment. In 2020, Levdeo launched the Letin brand and started to enter the new energy vehicle market and plans to launch a number of models similar to Japanese K-Car, with the Mengo being the first entry to the segment.

The Letin Mengo comes in three versions, each with a different type of battery and is available with two powertrain setups. The base model is rear-motor, rear-wheel-drive and powered by a 25 kW (34 hp; 34 PS) electric motor and 105 N⋅m (77 lb⋅ft) of torque, powered by an 11.52 kWh lithium battery. Capable of a range of 130 km (81 mi). For the medium variant, the 25 kW motor is shared and also rear-motor, rear-wheel-drive with the battery increased to a capacity of 17.28 kWh, supporting a range up to 185 kilometres (115 mi). The third option increases the power of the motor up to 35 kW (47 hp; 48 PS) while being front-motor, front-wheel-drive, and is paired with a higher capacity battery of 29.44 kWh, and 300 km (186 mi) of range.

The interior of the Letin Mengo city car is equipped with a 9-inch central control screen and a full LCD instrument panel, supporting the Internet of Vehicles functions, and an additional 19 storage spaces are designed within the interior of the car. The vehicle is also equipped with ADAS assisted driving system and automatic parking function.

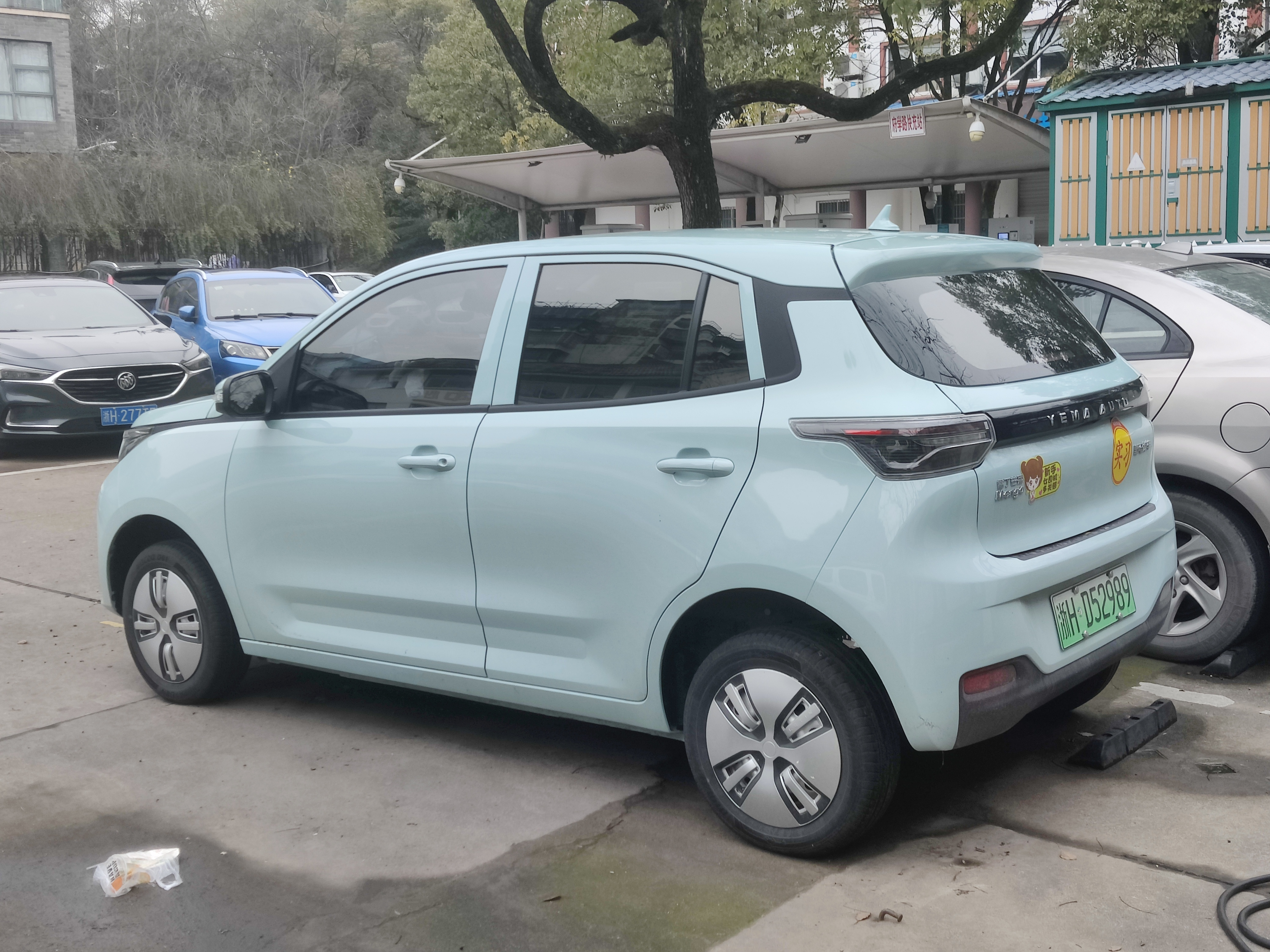
Rear view
