= Bordrin =

Chinese automobile manufacturer

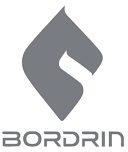
- Type: Private
- Industry: Automotive
- Founded: 2016; 10 years ago
- Founder: Huang Ximing
- Defunct: 2021
- Headquarters: Nanjing
- Key people: Bao Yimin, Zhang Zhiwei
- Number of employees: 600

Bordrin (Chinese: 博骏) was a Chinese automobile manufacturer with headquarters in Nanjing, China, that specialized in developing electric vehicles.

== History ==
Bordrin was founded in 2016 by Huang Ximing, and was based in Nanjing. In 2018, Bordrin partnered with Torc Robotics, based in Blacksburg, Virginia. In 2019, Bordrin created 3 electric SUV platforms: The i-SP, i-MP and i-LP. Bordrin also founded a partnership with Tianjin FAW Xiali Automobile Co., another electric vehicle company based in China, in 2019.

Bordrin's first vehicle was the iV6, introduced in 2019. The Bordrin iV6 dimensions are 4,700–1,905–1,640 mm (185.0–75.0–64.6 in) (length - width - height), and was claimed to have a L3 autonomous driving system. The interior features a 310-millimetre (12.2 in) multimedia touch screen, and a one-touch climate system. The iV6 can be fully charged in one hour.

In 2019, Bordrin introduced the iV7. It is also called the iEV7. It was first shown on April 16, 2019, at the Shanghai Auto Show.

Because of economic crisis caused by the COVID-19 pandemic, Bordrin's sales and vehicle price went down during the pandemic in 2020, at US$10.23 million, from $33.61 million in 2019. Bordrin filed for bankruptcy in early 2021 and underwent liquidation.

== Vehicles ==
=== Past concept models ===
Bordrin had 2 concept vehicles.

Model	Photo	Specifications
Bordrin iV6		Body style: mid-size Crossover SUV Class: J-segment Doors: 5 Seats: 5 Battery: Production: Cancelled Revealed: 2019 Auto Shanghai
Bordrin iV7		Body style: mid-size Crossover SUV Class: J-segment Doors: 5 Seats: 5-6 Battery: Production: Cancelled Revealed: 2019 Auto Shanghai

== See also ==
- Leapmotor
- Min'an Electric
- Sinogold
