= Sinogold =

Chinese automobile manufacturer

- Type: Private
- Industry: Automotive
- Founded: 2016; 10 years ago
- Founder: Zhongwei Wang
- Defunct: 2024; 2 years ago
- Headquarters: Shandong
- Key people: Zhongwei Wang
- Website: www.guojinauto.com?renqun_youhua=184421

Sinogold (Chinese: 国金) was a Chinese automobile manufacturer headquartered in Shandong, China, that specialized in producing electric vehicles.

== History ==
Sinogold was founded by Zhongwei Wang in 2016, and is based in Shandong. Sinogold joined with Shandong Guojin (Kingold) Automobile Manufacturing Co. in May 2016. Sinogold's factory stamps, welds, assembles, and paints all Sinogold vehicles.

Sinogold produced the K01 and the K03 in 2016, but they both failed to enter production. They later became the GM3.

There first production vehicle was the G60, which was later renamed the Sinogold GM3. It came out in 2017 and was a compact MPV heavily inspired by the Citroen Grand C4 Picasso. Its dimensions are 4,615 mm/1,845 mm/1,655 mm, and a top speed of 150 kilometres per hour. In May 2017, Sinogold was sued for advertising a picture of the Citroen C4 instead of the Sinogold GM3.

As of December 2021, patent images of a rebadged Chery Arrizo 5e surfaced wearing the Sinogold logo. The electric compact car was codenamed SGA7000BEV3 and later unveiled to be the Sinogold Junxing. The Junxing features slightly restyled front grilles and front and rear bumpers with a length of 4572mm or 4602mm, a width of 1825mm and a height of 1496mm. The wheelbase is 2670mm long. The maximum power output was listed as 120kW.

For the next 4 years, the company remained focused on only one product, to present a second model in 2022 to complement the offer of fully electric vehicles. This time, Sinogold has partnered with the domestic giant Chery Automobile to develop a twin version of the Chery Arrizo 5e in the form of the Sinogold Junxing sedan. The agreement also included a similar model to another Chery product, the Jetour X70 SUV as registered in Chinese office regulating the admission of cars to traffic Sinogold Yuechi, However, this one did not go on sale in the end just like the design of the city model A00.

== Vehicles ==
=== Production cars ===
Model	Photo	Specifications
Sinogold GM3		Body style: 5-door minivan Class: Compact MPV (M) Doors: 5 Seats: 5 Battery: 55 kWh battery Production: 2018–2023 Revealed: -
Sinogold Junxing		Body style: 4-door sedan Class: Compact car (C) Doors: 4 Seats: 5 Battery: ternary lithium battery Production: 2022–2024 Revealed: -

=== Concept vehicles ===
Model	Photo	Specifications
Sinogold Yuechi		Body style: 5-door SUV Class: Mid-size crossover SUV (D) Doors: 5 Seats: 5 Battery: ternary lithium battery Production: - Revealed: -
Sinogold A00		Body style: 3-door hatchback Class: City car (A) Doors: 3 Seats: 2 Battery: ternary lithium battery Production: - Revealed: -

== See also ==
- Leapmotor
- Min'an Electric
- Nio
- Bordrin
