= Min'an Electric =

Chinese automobile manufacturer

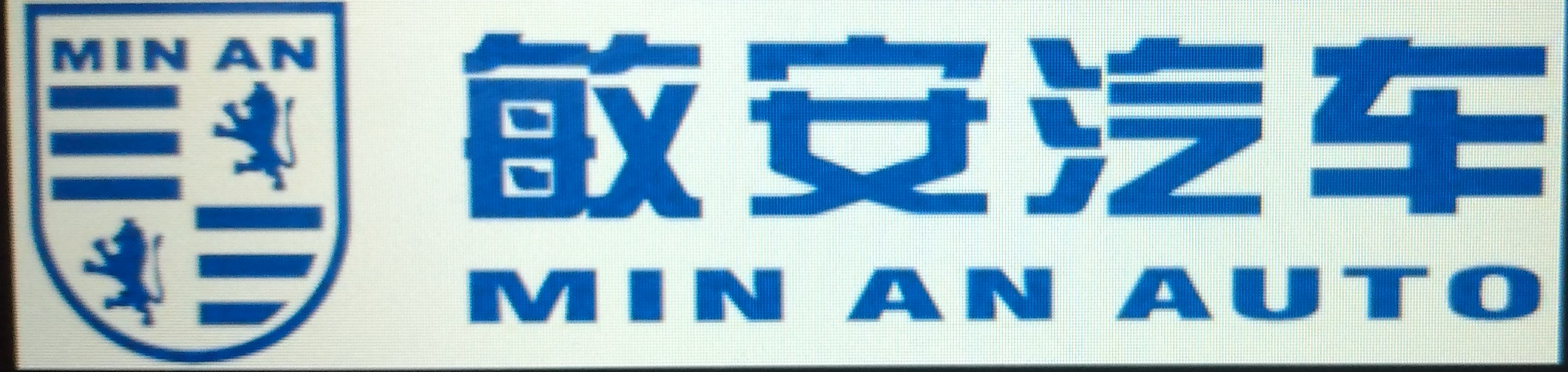
- Type: Private
- Industry: Automotive
- Founded: November 2011; 14 years ago
- Headquarters: Jiangsu, China
- Products: Automobiles
- Subsidiaries: Minwei Auto
- Website: www.minanmotor.com

Min'an Electric (Chinese: 敏安电动; simplified Chinese: 敏安电动; traditional Chinese: 敏安電動; pinyin: Mǐn ān diàndòng), also known as Min'an Auto, Min'an Motors, or simply Min'an, is a Chinese automobile manufacturer headquartered in Jiangsu, China, that specializes in producing electric vehicles.

== History ==
Min'an Electric was founded in 2011, and is based in Jiangsu, China. The founding of the company cost 2.5 billion yuan (US$365 million).

In October 2015, Min'an created Jiangsu Min'an Automotive Research Institute, a facility designed to test new technology. Min'an also partnered with Hong Kong Exhibition Plans Investment Co and Jiangsu Huai’an Development Holdings Ltd.

On November 2, 2018, the Min'an Automobile Plant was completed, costing 8.3 billion yuan. The factory stamps, welds, paints, assembles, packs, tests and inspections, vehicle parts logistics, and tests all Min'an vehicles. It also includes an office area and living facilities, a photovoltaic power station, and rainwater reuse stations.

The CO1 was made in early 2016. The CO1 was a mail car used by the Chinese government from 2018–present.

In 2016, Min'an produced the D01, an electric sports car prototype.

They produced the E01 in 2020. The E01 made production under the name ET-5. Which is based on the JMEV E400 (EVEasy EX5) rebadged as the ET-5, called Mintou.

In 2020, Min'an introduced the A02. The A02 later made production as the MX-6.

Min'an created to pure electric vehicles: The MX-6 and the ET-5. The MX-6 was introduced in China in 2020. It is powered by a 125 kWh battery with 168 hp. Its dimensions measure 4701 mm/1889 mm/1706 mm. It has a kerb weight of 1869 kg. The ET-5 was also introduced in 2020. The ET-5 failed to make production, and was remade under the name JMC E400.

== Vehicles ==
=== Current models ===
Min'an Electric currently has 3 prototype vehicles. None of the vehicles are in production as of February 2022.

Model	Photo	Specifications
Min'an Electric D01		Body style: Sports car Class: Doors: 4 Seats: Battery: Revealed: 2016 Taiwan Enterprise Fair
Min'an Electric MX-6		Body style: SUV Class: Doors: 5 Seats: 5 Battery: 125 kWh Revealed: 2020
Min'an Electric CO1		Body style: Van Class: Doors: 3 Seats: 2 Battery: Revealed: 2016

== See also ==
- Leapmotor
- Sinogold
