= FAW-GM Kuncheng =

Chinese compact pickup

Kuncheng

Overview
- Manufacturer: FAW-GM
- Production: 2011–2015

Body and chassis
- Class: Compact pickup truck
- Body style: 4-door Truck
- Related: Isuzu D-Max

Powertrain
- Engine: 2.2 L I4 (gasoline) turbo 2.4 L I4 (diesel)
- Transmission: 5-speed manual

Dimensions
- Wheelbase: 3,025 mm (119.1 in)
- Length: 5,070 mm (199.6 in)
- Width: 1,740 mm (68.5 in)
- Height: 1,720 mm (67.7 in)
- Curb weight: 1480kg

The FAW-GM Kuncheng (坤程) is a compact pickup truck that is developed as a joint venture between General Motors and First Automotive Works. It is currently sold only in mainland China.

== Overview ==
The FAW-GM Kuncheng pickup is only available as a crew cab with the body being shared with the pre-facelift first generation Isuzu D-Max due to the GM connection. The powertrain is a domestic-sourced 2.2 liter gasoline engine from Chinese engine maker Xin’guang Huachen with a maximum output of 76 kW (102 hp) and 193 N⋅m (142 lb⋅ft), mated to a 5-speed manual transmission. A model powered by a 2.4 liter diesel engine is also available.
