= FAW Car =

Chinese car manufacturer

FAW Car Co., Ltd 一汽轿车股份有限公司
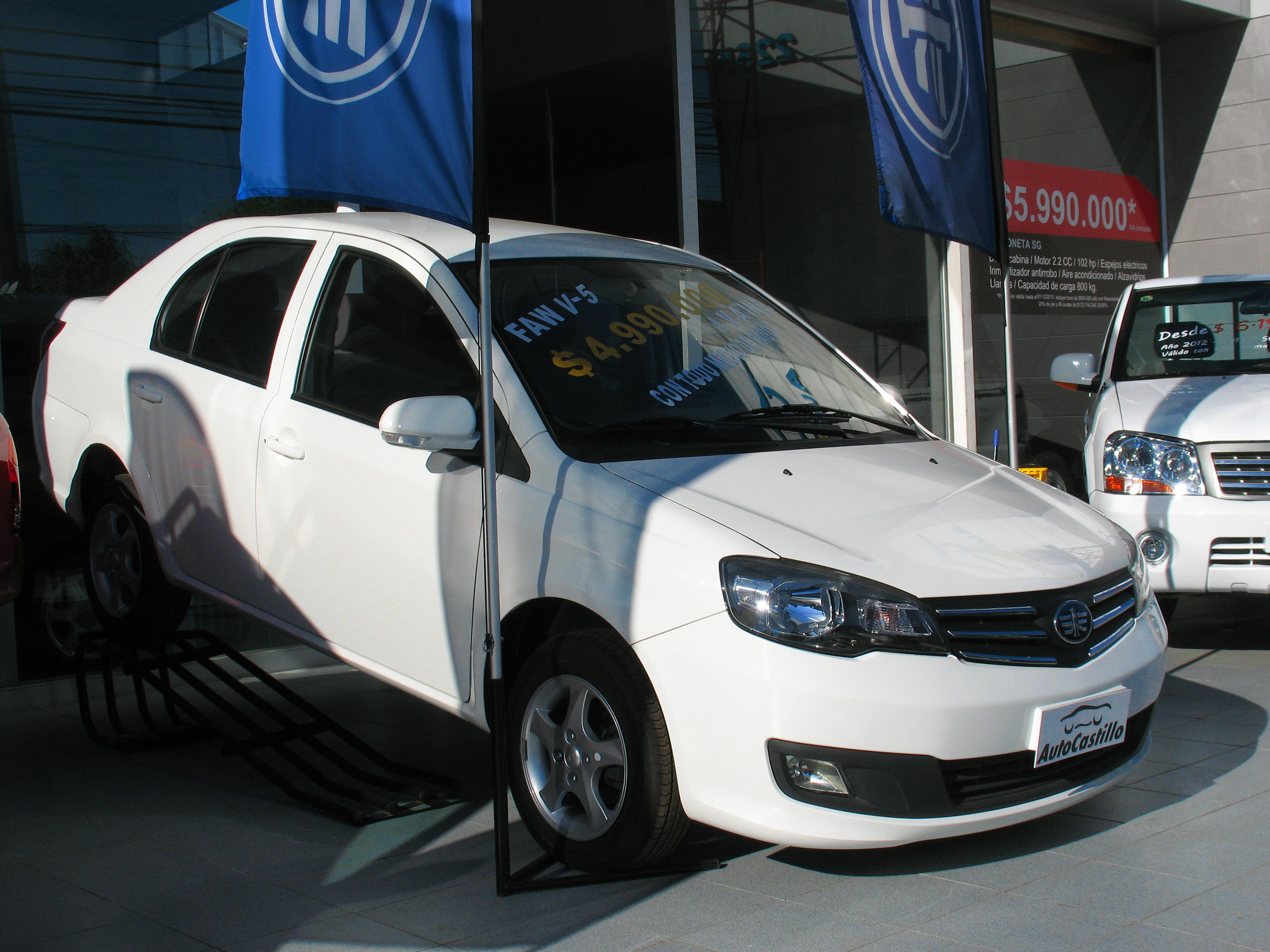
- Type: Public
- Traded as: SZSE: 000800
- Industry: Automotive
- Founded: 1997; 29 years ago
- Headquarters: Changchun, Jilin, China
- Key people: Xu Jian (chairman)
- Parent: FAW Group
- Website: www.fawcar.com.cn

FAW Car
- Simplified Chinese: 一汽轿车股份有限公司
- Traditional Chinese: 一汽轎車股份有限公司
Transcriptions
Standard Mandarin
- Hanyu Pinyin: Yīqì Jiàochē Gǔfèn Yǒuxiàn Gōngsī

FAW Car Company Limited is a subsidiary of FAW Group in Changchun, Jilin, China. It has been listed on the Shenzhen Stock Exchange since 1997. Its passenger car marques include Hongqi, Bestune, FAW and Oley.
