= FAW-GM =

Commercial vehicle manufacturing company

FAW-GM Light Duty Commercial Vehicle
- Company type: Joint venture
- Industry: Automotive
- Founded: 30 August 2009; 16 years ago
- Headquarters: Changchun, China
- Key people: Alexander Moinov (president)
- Products: Trucks
- Owner: FAW Group (50%); General Motors (50%)

FAW-GM Light Duty Commercial Vehicle (FAW-GM) is a commercial vehicle manufacturing company headquartered in Changchun, China, and a 50:50 joint venture between FAW Group and General Motors. It was founded in 2009 and its activities include the Harbin Light Vehicle factory and FAW Hongta Yunnan Automobile Co Ltd. The plants were named,FAW Harbin Light Duty Vehicle Co., FAW-GM Hongta Yunnan Automobile Manufacturing Co., Ltd. and Changchun Plant. The company builds Jie Fang pickups and light commercial vehicles, with the possibility of building models for GM to sell under their marques.

FAW-GM sold a total of 55,609 vehicles in China in 2012.

In 2019, GM withdrew from the joint venture. The company was then renamed to FAW Light Commercial Vehicle and becomes wholly owned by FAW.

== Products ==
FAW-GM builds pickups, vans, SUVs, MPVs, 1-ton, 2-ton and 3-ton trucks and exports CKD kits for assembly in Russia, Ukraine, Mexico and Vietnam, and exports to more than 20 countries. In 2011, FAW-GM introduced a new pickup, the Kuncheng.

FAW-GM's current products include the following models:

- Jie Fang Kuncheng Pickup
- Jie Fang 1-ton truck
- Jie Fang 2-ton truck
- Jie Fang 3-ton truck
