= FAW Bus and Coach =

Chinese bus manufacturer

- Founded: 1959; 67 years ago
- Headquarters: Wuxi, Jiangsu, China
- Products: Buses
- Parent: FAW Group
- Website: www.taihubus.com

FAW Bus and Coach (Chinese: 一汽客车无锡有限公司) is a bus manufacturer located in Wuxi, Jiangsu, China. Founded in 1959, it was assigned under the FAW Group in 1986. The buses are sold under the Taihu brand.

The Dalian division of FAW Bus and Coach Co Ltd manufactures Jie Fang and Yuan Zheng brand medium and large-size buses in a 186,300-square-meter factory in Dalian, Liaoning, China. An unfinished bus production base at the Dalian Economic & Technological Development Zone is expected to be completed in mid-2010 and will produce hybrid buses.

In 2018, CRRC Electric Vehicle Times Electric Vehicle Co. merged FAW Bus (Wuxi) Co. through a capital increase and established Wuxi CSR New Energy Vehicle Co.

== Models ==
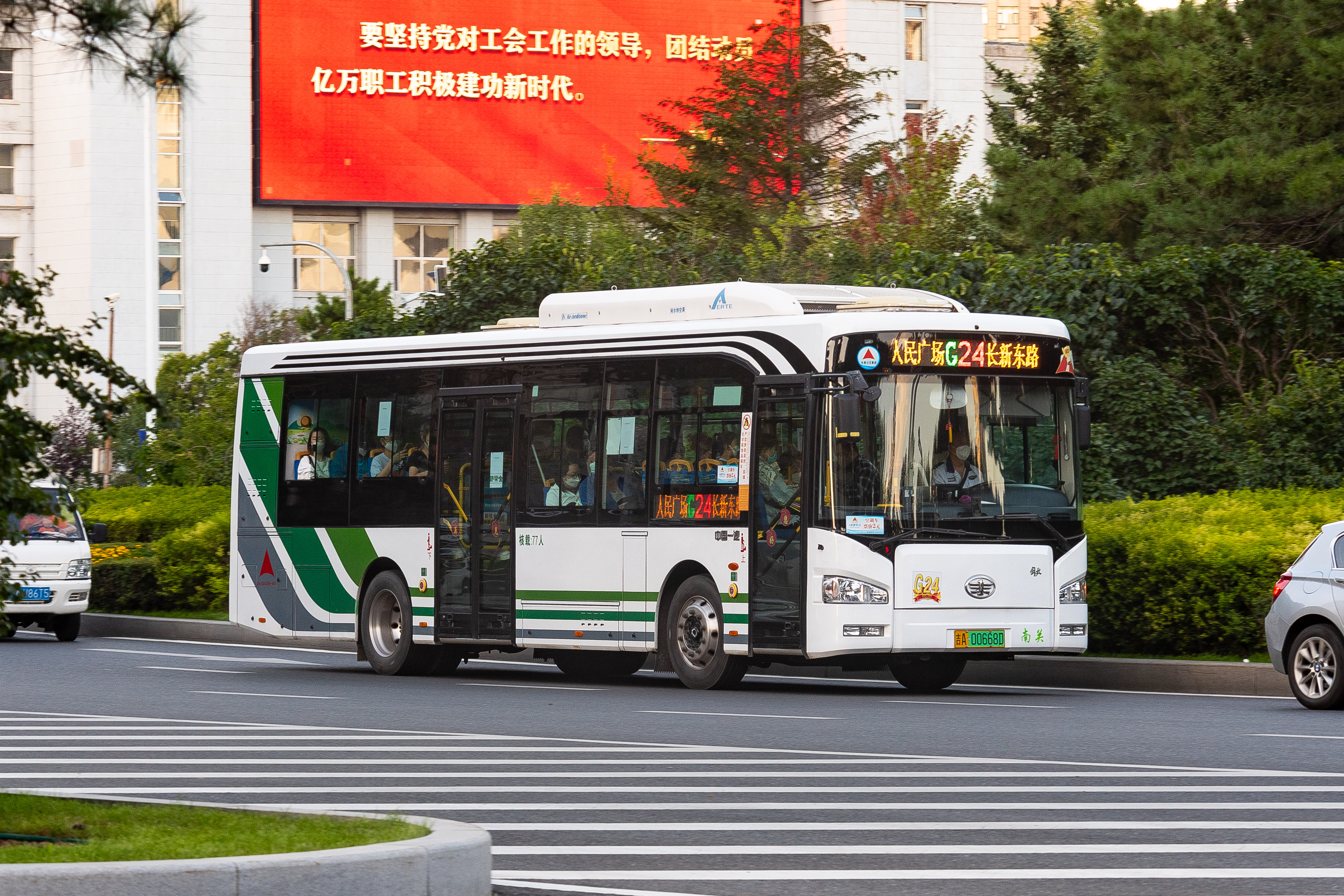
CA6100UR series in Changchun Public Transport service

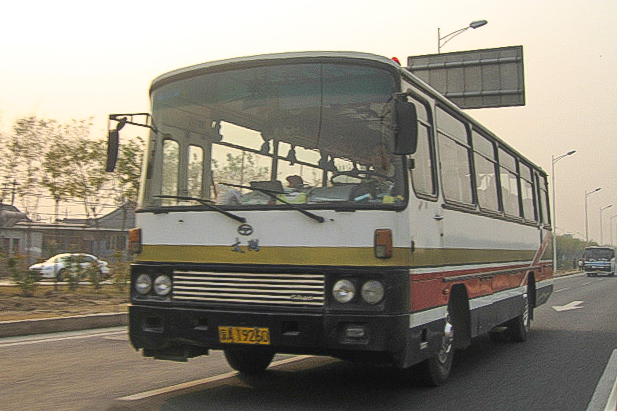
XQ6960 series, an early model of Taihu Bus

- Taihu CA6100S1H2
- Taihu CA6100S2H2
- Taihu CA6122CH2
- Taihu XQ6102SH2
- Taihu XQ6103Y1H2
- Taihu XQ6104S
- Taihu XQ6113Y1H2
- Taihu XQ6123Y1H2
- Taihu XQ6600TQ9
- Taihu XQ6601TQ9
- Taihu XQ6609TQ2
- Taihu XQ6739SH2
- Taihu XQ6761SH9
- Taihu XQ6769SH2
- Taihu XQ6791YH2
- Taihu XQ6820S1H2
- Taihu XQ6861YH2
- Taihu XQ6890SH2
- Taihu XQ6890S1H2
- Taihu XQ6961T1
