= Bestune Yueyi 03 =

Battery electric compact crossover SUV

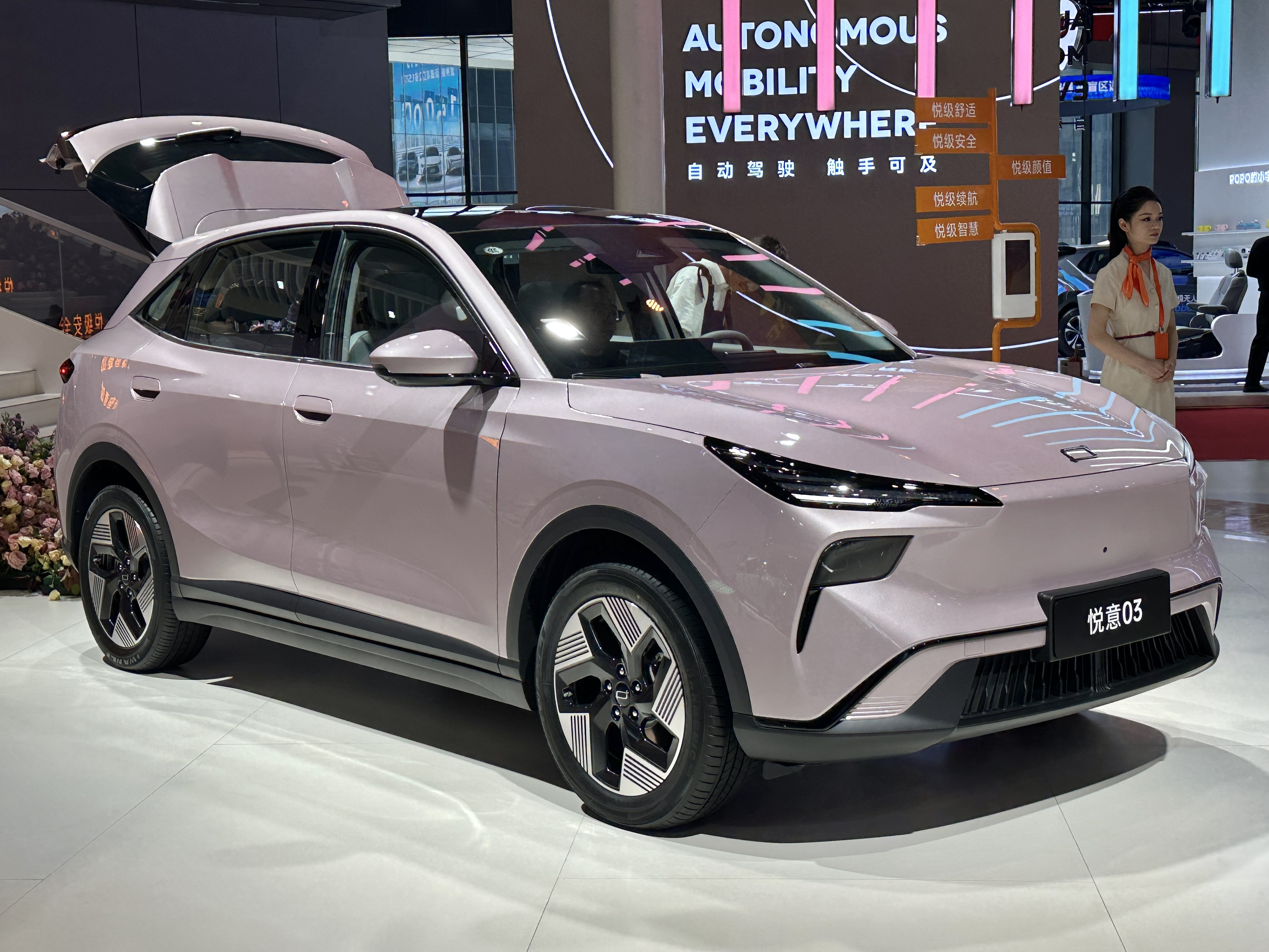

Overview
- Manufacturer: Bestune (FAW Group)
- Model code: E311
- Production: 2025–present
- Assembly: China: Changchun

Body and chassis
- Class: Compact crossover SUV (C)
- Body style: 5-door SUV
- Layout: Front engine, front-wheel drive

Powertrain
- Power output: 166 hp (124 kW; 168 PS)
- Battery: 45.83 kWh LFP CALB; 61.47 kWh LFP
- Electric range: 445–565 km (277–351 mi) (CLTC)

Dimensions
- Wheelbase: 2,750 mm (108.3 in)
- Length: 4,450 mm (175.2 in)
- Width: 1,860 mm (73.2 in)
- Height: 1,635 mm (64.4 in)
- Curb weight: 1,590 kg (3,505 lb)

The Bestune Yueyi 03 (Chinese: 一汽悦意03) is a battery electric compact crossover SUV produced by the FAW Group under the brand name Bestune.

== Overview ==
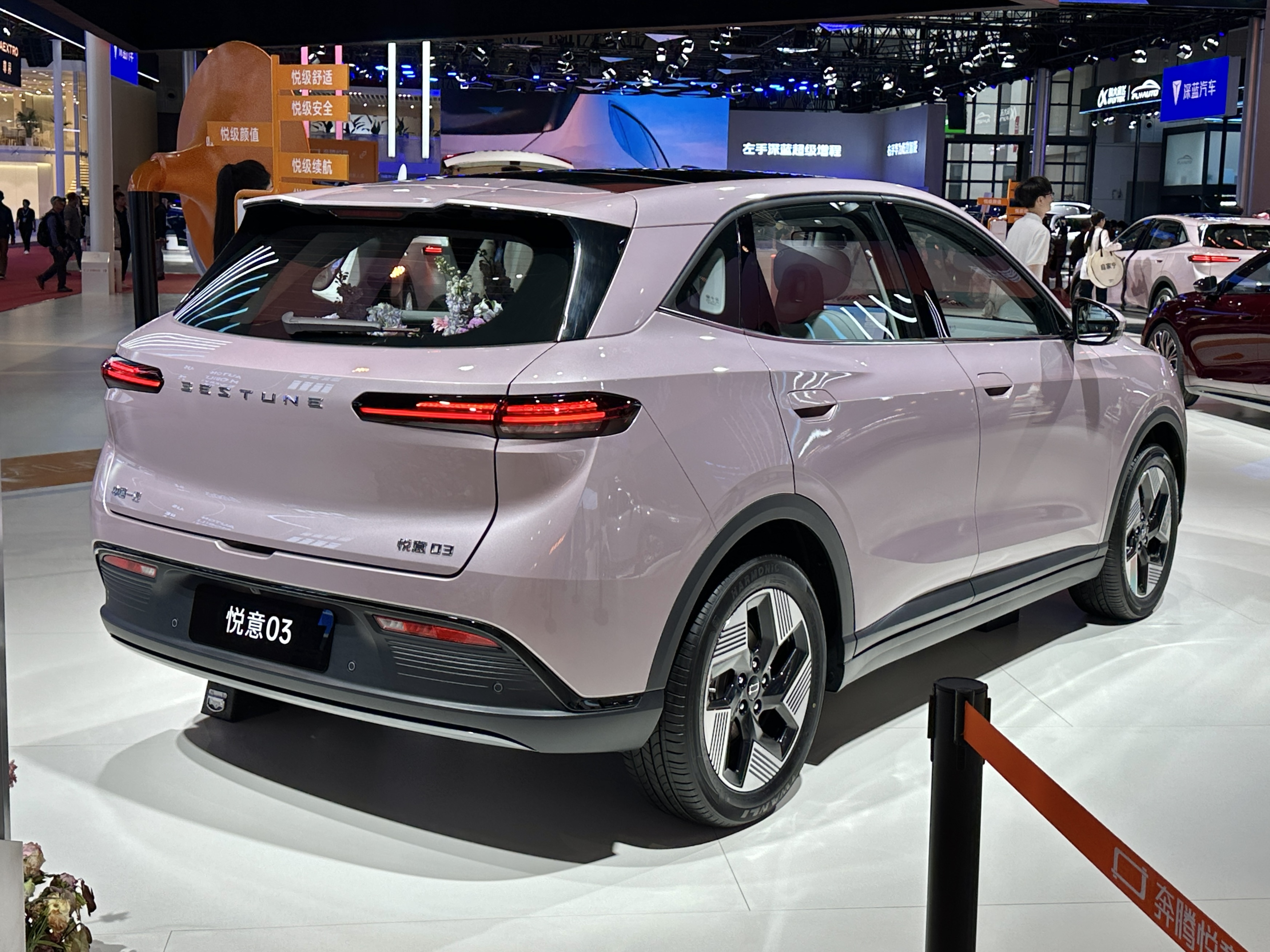
Rear view

In November 2024, the FAW Group was unveiled the first model in its new, electrified Yueyi line. The Yueyi 03 is a compact crossover maintains the same aesthetic as its competitors, featuring split, double-row headlights, narrow taillights, and body proportions designed for optimal aerodynamics.

The passenger compartment features a two-tone, black-and-white aesthetic, present both in the massive, vertically sloping cockpit and on the door panels. A digital instrument display sits in front of the two-spoke steering wheel, and a 14.6-inch touchscreen infotainment system sits in the center of the console.

== Specifications ==
The Yueyi 03 is equipped with a fully electric drive system, featuring a 166 horsepower (124 kW; 168 PS) motor with a maximum torque of 200 N⋅m (150 lb⋅ft). Its 48.35 kWh battery provides a combined range of up to 445 kilometers (277 miles) according to the Chinese CLTC measurement standard.

== Sales ==
Year	China
2025	25,989
