= FAW Group =

Chinese central state-owned automobile manufacturer

China FAW Group Corporation Limited

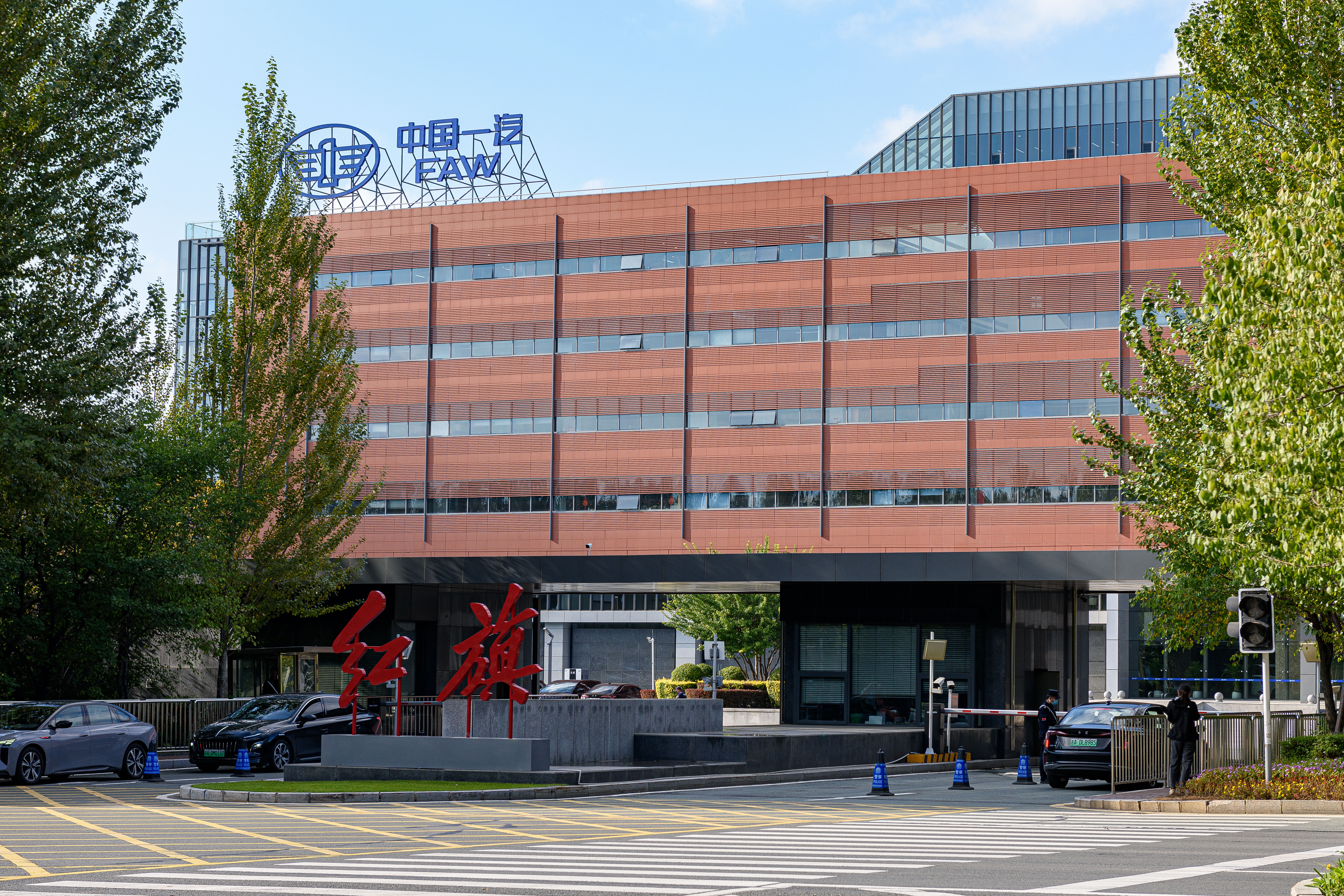
- FAW Group headquarters in Changchun
- Native name: 中国第一汽车集团有限公司
- Type: State-owned enterprise
- Industry: Automotive
- Founded: 15 July 1953; 73 years ago
- Headquarters: Changchun, Jilin, China
- Area served: Asia-Pacific (except Taiwan, South Korea, Japan), Central Asia, Middle East and North Africa, Sub-Saharan Africa, Latin America, Caribbean
- Key people: Qiu Xiandong (Chairman) Liu Yigong (President) Giles Taylor (Global Vice President of Design)
- Products: Automobiles; Buses; Trucks; Automotive components
- Production output: 3,302,000 units (2025)
- Revenue: ▲US$ 89.5 billion (2023)
- Net income: ▼US$ 2.9 billion (2023)
- Total assets: US$ 99.5 billion (2023)
- Number of employees: 119,658 (2023)
- Divisions: Hongqi; Jiefang; Bestune
- Subsidiaries: List: Transportation; FAW Car Company; FAW Jilin; FAW Tianjin; FAW Jiefang; FAW Bus and Coach; FAW Hongta; FAW-GM; Jiefang; FAW-Volkswagen; Chendu FAW Other; FAW Tool; FAW Tool and Die; FAW Foundry; Harbin Light Vehicle Factory; Dalian Diesel Engine; The 9th Industrial Machinery Design and Research Institute International: FAW Eastern Europe; Myanmar FAW; FAW Pakistan; FAW USA

Chinese name
- Simplified Chinese: 第一汽车集团
- Traditional Chinese: 第一汽車集團
- Literal meaning: First Automotive Group
Transcriptions
Standard Mandarin
- Hanyu Pinyin: Dìyī Qìchē Jítuán

Abbreviation
- Simplified Chinese: 中国一汽
- Traditional Chinese: 中國一汽
Transcriptions
Standard Mandarin
- Hanyu Pinyin: Zhōngguó Yīqì
- Website: faw.com

China FAW Group Corp., Ltd. (First Automotive Works) is a Chinese central state-owned automobile manufacturer headquartered in Changchun, Jilin. Founded on 15 July 1953, it is currently the second largest of the "Big Four" state-owned car manufacturers of China, together with SAIC Motor, Dongfeng Motor Corporation and Changan Automobile.

The company produces and sells vehicles under its own branding, such as Hongqi, Bestune (Benteng) and under foreign-branded joint ventures such as FAW-Toyota and FAW-Volkswagen (Volkswagen, Audi, Jetta).

Its principal products are automobiles, buses, light, medium and heavy-duty trucks, and auto parts. FAW became China's first automobile manufacturer when it unveiled the nation's first domestically produced passenger car, the Hongqi, in 1958.

As a state-owned enterprise of China, FAW Group is controlled and managed by State-owned Assets Supervision and Administration Commission of the State Council (SASAC), which under Chinese law performs the functions of an investor.

The company has three publicly traded subsidiaries: FAW Jiefang Group Co., Ltd. (SZSE: 000800), Changchun FAWAY Automobile Components Co., Ltd. (SSE: 600742) and Qiming Information Technology Co., Ltd. (SZSE: 002232).

== History ==
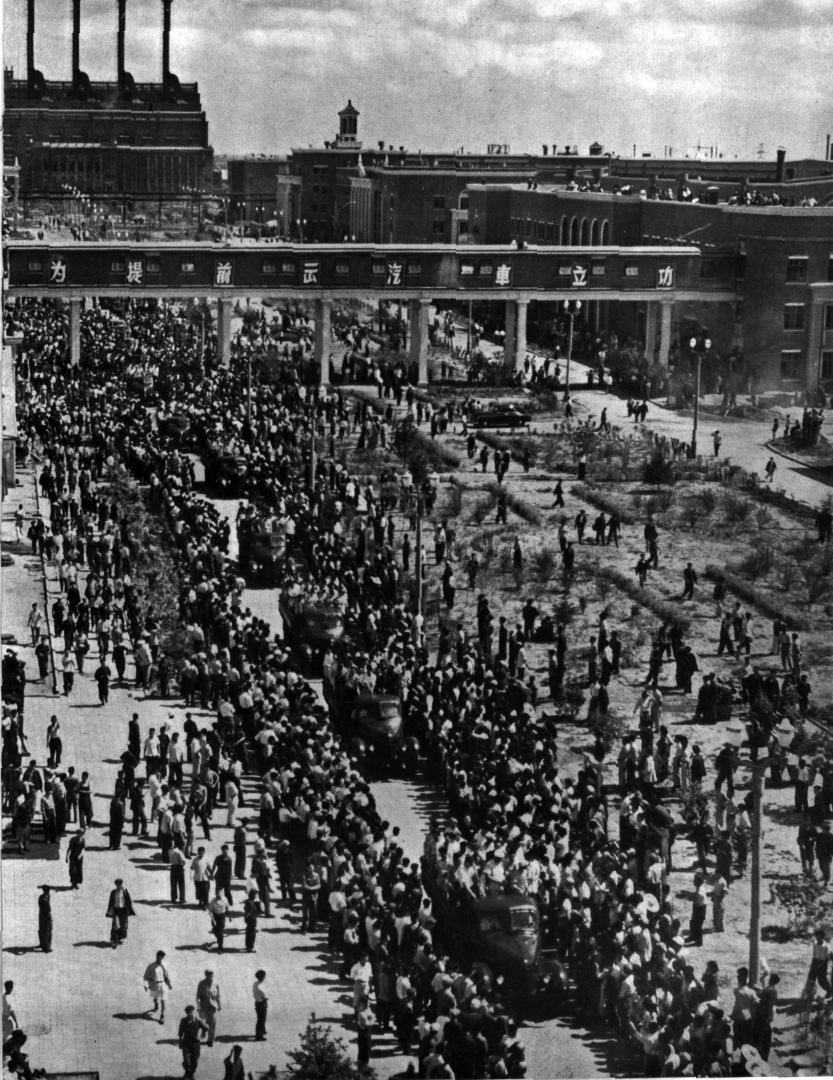
First Automotive Works' first products, 1956

First Automotive Works broke ground on its first factory in 1953 (the first year of the first five-year plan), and produced its first product, the Jiefang CA-10 truck (based on the Soviet ZIS-150) in 1956.

The Soviet Union lent assistance during these early years providing technical support, tooling, and production machinery. Before the first factory opened, 39 Chinese FAW employees traveled to the Stalin Truck Factory for instruction in truck production. Operations were conducted under Soviet direction, and the USSR is even credited with choosing Changchun as the location for the first FAW facility.

First Automotive Works initially made only commercial trucks, but started producing passenger cars in 1958. These vehicles, Hongqi luxury sedans, were the first domestically produced Chinese automobiles. Made primarily for the party elite, the design changed little over their thirty-year production run. Following this, FAW's Audi products are the traditionally favoured choice for ranking Chinese state officials.

The First Automotive Works "winged 1" badge is derived from the Chinese 一汽 ("一" meaning "one" and "汽", from "汽车" meaning "automotive") and depicts a hawk spreading its wings, 一 (1). The logo was introduced in 1964.

During the Third Front campaign to develop strategic industries in China's rugged interior to prepare for potential invasion from the United States or the Soviet Union, the First Automotive Works transferred a third of its workforce to develop the Second Automotive Works.

In 1992, the name First Automotive Works was changed to FAW Group Corporation.

Though FAW was the fourth Chinese automaker to take on Western partners, its early joint venture with Volkswagen (VW) in 1990 saw it become the second Chinese auto company to develop a strong cooperative relationship with a foreign counterpart. SAIC was the first, in 1984 and also with VW.

Volkswagen was the first foreign partner for FAW, but others soon followed. The company acquired 50% ownership of Tianjin Automotive Xiali in September, 2002, and renamed the brand FAW Tianjin. As a result, FAW ended up with Toyota as a foreign joint venture partner. FAW established a joint venture with General Motors in 2009 and has joint ventures with a handful of other foreign companies as well.

FAW Group logo, 2009–2022

In 2008, the company produced more than 1.5 million vehicles. In 2009, it was the largest machinery corporation and the second largest auto maker in China. In 2010, the 2.56 million units sold made it the third most-productive vehicle maker in China that year, and one of its offerings, the FAW Xiali, was the 7th most-purchased car in China in 2010. It produced 2.6 million vehicles in 2011, the third-largest output of any China-based company. While it retained its third place rank, the number of whole vehicles produced in 2012 slowed to 2.3 million. Passenger cars made up a relatively scant 64% of total production that year.

In September 2018, British car designer Giles Taylor joined the FAW Group as Global Vice President of Design and Chief Creative Officer for Hongqi. In July 2021, FAW transferred 49% of the shares of FAW Haima to Hainan Development Holdings Co., Ltd. (Hainan Holdings) at no charge. Haima Automobile holds 51% of the shares in FAW Haima, while Hainan Holdings hold 49% of the shares.

As of 2024, many other brands have been liquidated, leaving only Hongqi and Bestune as passenger car brands.

=== Collaboration with Leapmotor ===
In March 2025, FAW Group and Leapmotor signed the MOU on strategic cooperation, under which the two parties will jointly develop passenger vehicles and collaborate on auto parts.

In May 2025 at the Auto Shanghai, Zhu Jiangming, Chairman of Leapmotor, revealed that the two companies have finalized their partnership and will jointly develop a model for the Hongqi brand targeting overseas markets. Mass production of the new vehicle is set to begin in the second half of 2026 at Leapmotor's Hangzhou plant. The new Hongqi model will be built on the same platform as Leapmotor B10 with both battery electric and range-extender powertrain.

=== Collaboration with Yueda Group ===
In September 2023, Bestune announced the completion of its capital increase project, the registered capital increased from CNY 6.0 billion to CNY 8.4 billion. Yueda Automotive Group, a subsidiary of state-owned Yueda Group, became the first external investor introduced to Bestune. FAW Corporation Limited (FAW Group), FAW Equity Investment, and Yueda Automotive Group hold stakes of 86.16%, 11.87%, and 1.97%, respectively.

In September 2025, FAW Group, Yueda Automotive, Agricultural Bank of China, China Telecom, and Nanjing Horizon Information Technology jointly increased their capital investment in Bestune, raising a total of 8.55 billion yuan. Following the capital increase, the equity structure of Bestune changed. The combined shareholding of FAW and FAW Equity Investment in Bestune decreased from 86.1568% to 79.0394%. Yueda Automotive's shareholding increased from 1.9741% to 10.3358%, making it the second-largest shareholder. Nanjing Horizon, Agricultural Bank of China, and China Telecom hold 0.6044%, 6.0443%, and 3.0222% respectively.

In June 2026, at the Yueyi 08 launch event, FAW Group announced that FAW Yueyi has been upgraded to an independent new energy brand.

=== Collaboration with GAC Group ===
In September 2026, GAC Group announced that it planned to acquire part of the equity of a vehicle joint venture held by FAW Group through the issuance of shares, and to raise supporting funds. Upon completion of the transaction, FAW Group will become the second largest shareholder of GAC Group.

== List of Chairmen ==
Current Qiu Xiandong (since September 2023)

=== Past Chairmen ===
- Xu Jianyi (2010–2015)
- Xu Ping (2015–2017)
- Xu Liuping (2017–2023)

== Brands and products ==
FAW sold products under at least ten different brands including its own, but most of its brands has been discontinued or consolidated into Hongqi, Jiefang, Bestune and Yueyi brand currently.

=== Hongqi ===
Hongqi, meaning "red flag" in Chinese, is a luxury car marque owned by the FAW Group. Hongqi was launched in 1958. It is the oldest Chinese passenger car marque.

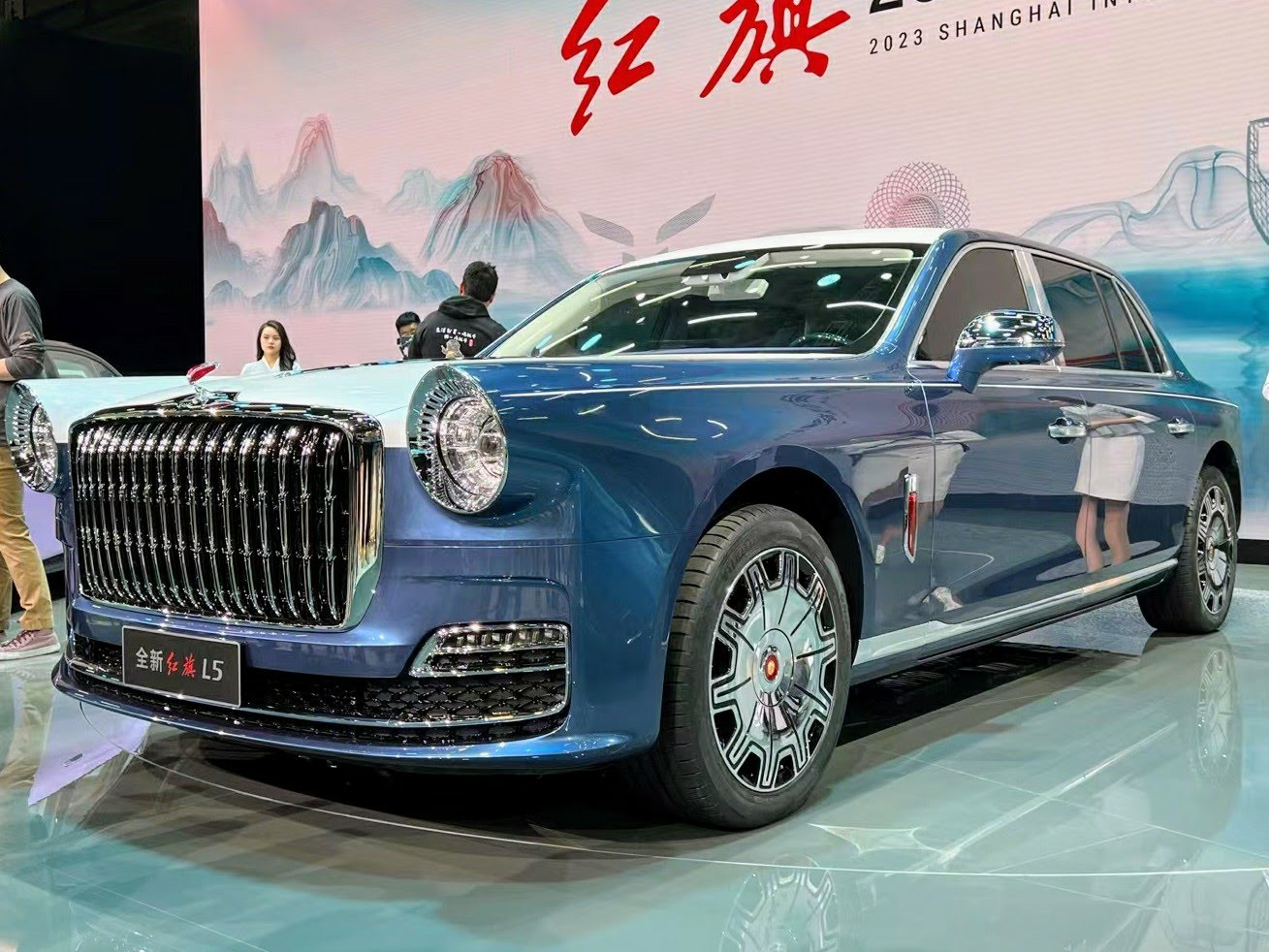
Hongqi L5

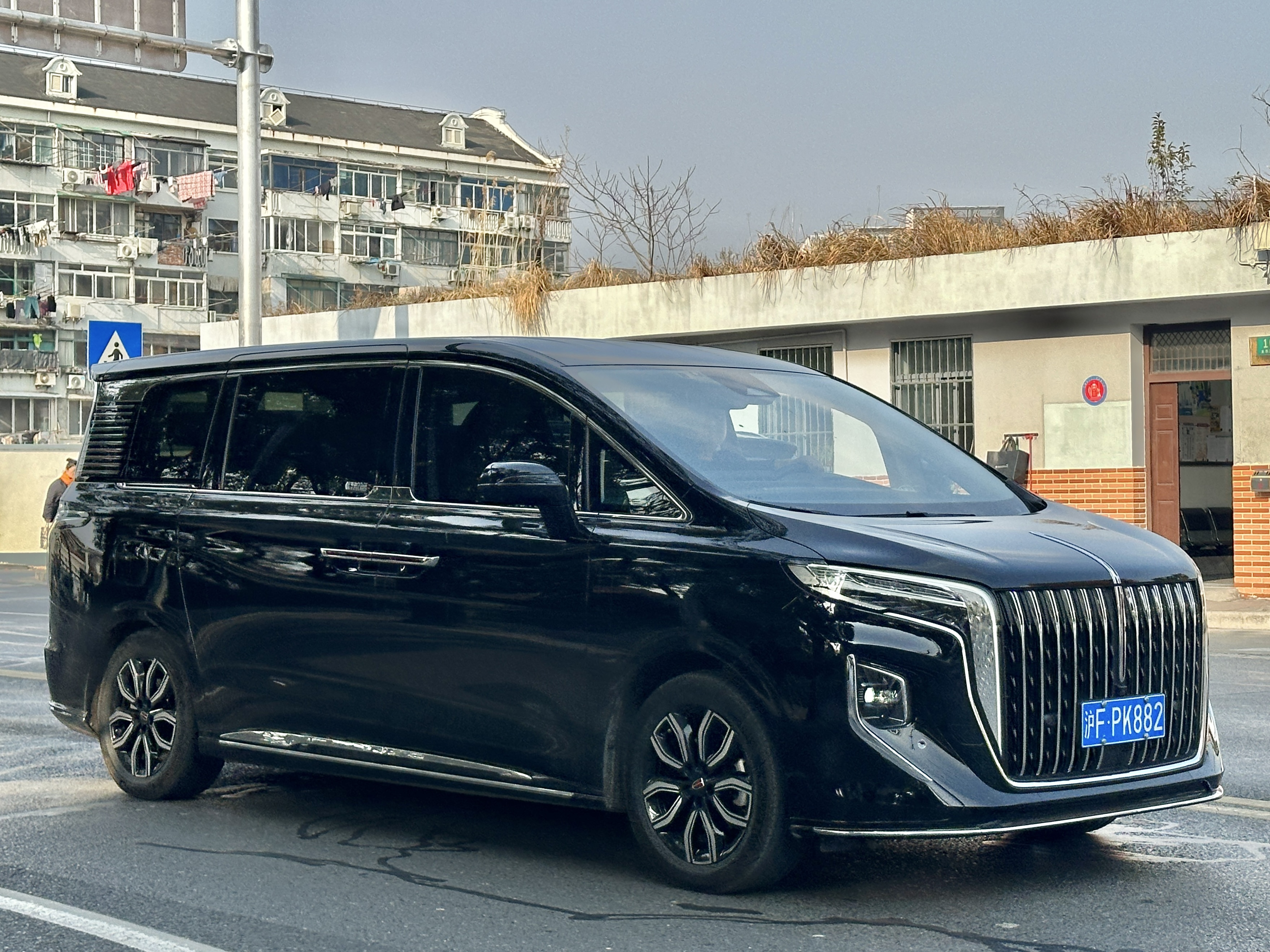
Hongqi HQ9

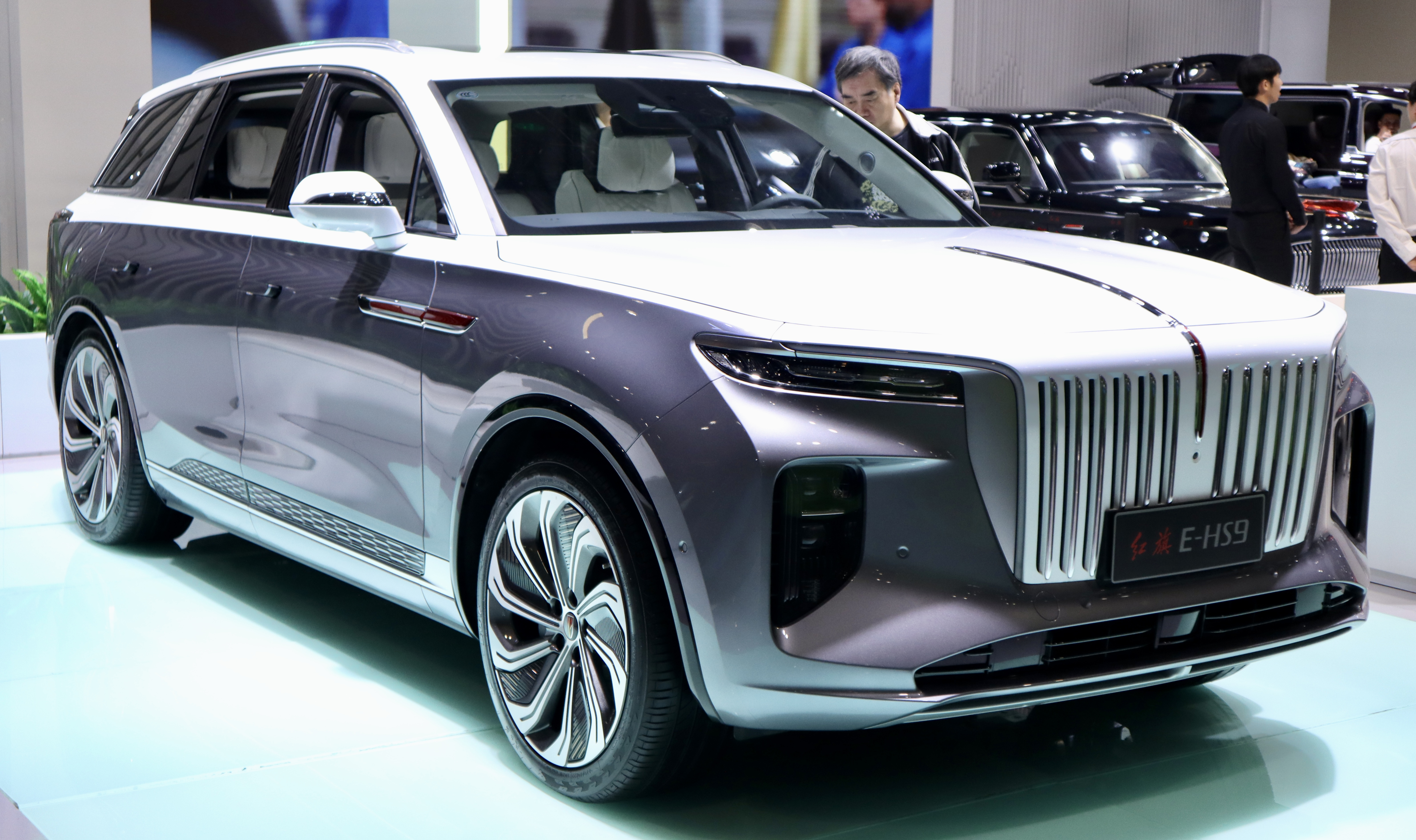
Hongqi E-HS9

=== Jiefang ===
Jiefang is the medium and heavy truck brand of FAW Group. The first truck was produced 1956. It was the first-ever truck built by the People's Republic of China.

Jiefang became a subsidiary on 18 January 2003 with two subsidiaries of its own, Qingdao Truck Division and FAW Trading Company, it is one make of Jiefang branded trucks.

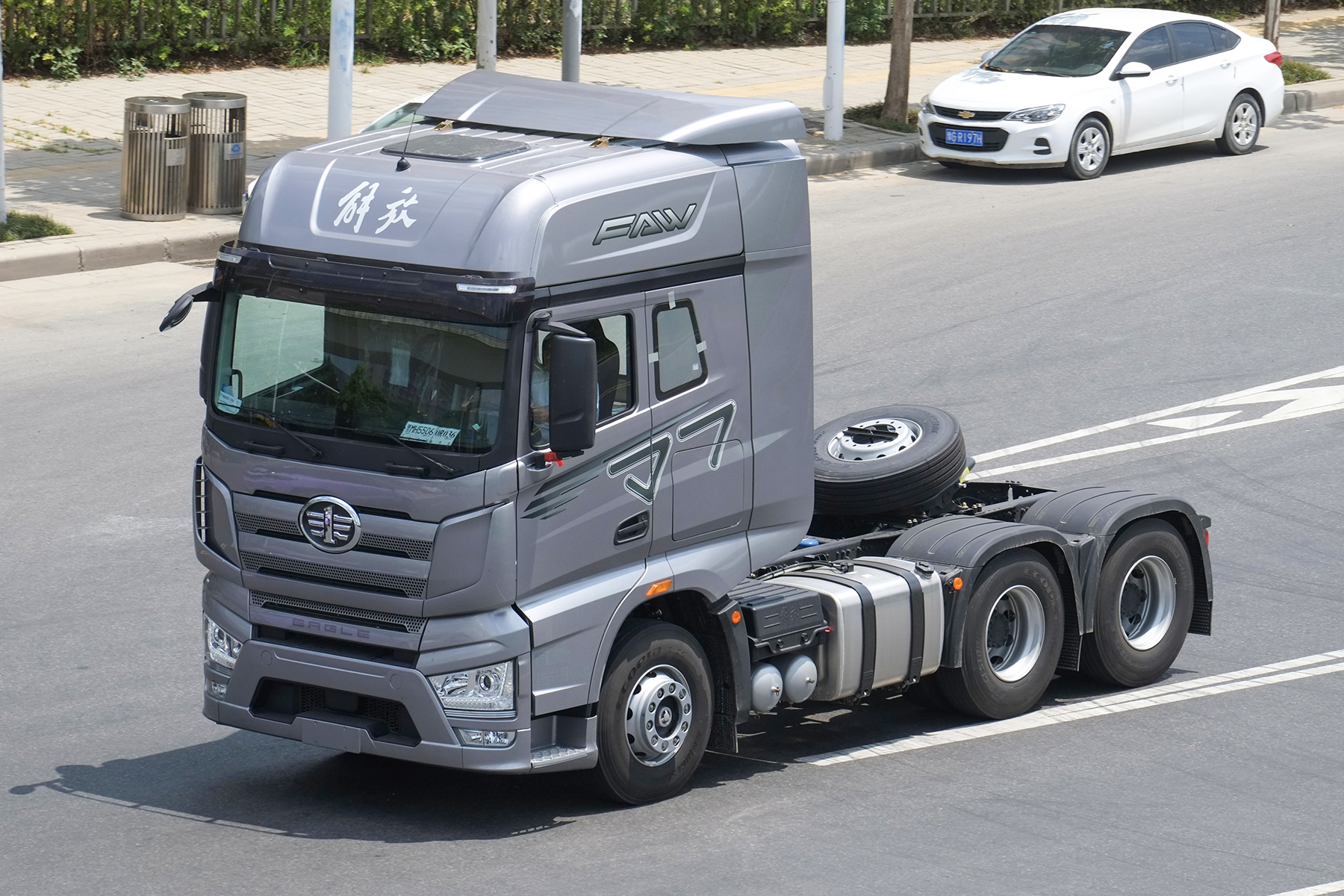
Jiefang J7

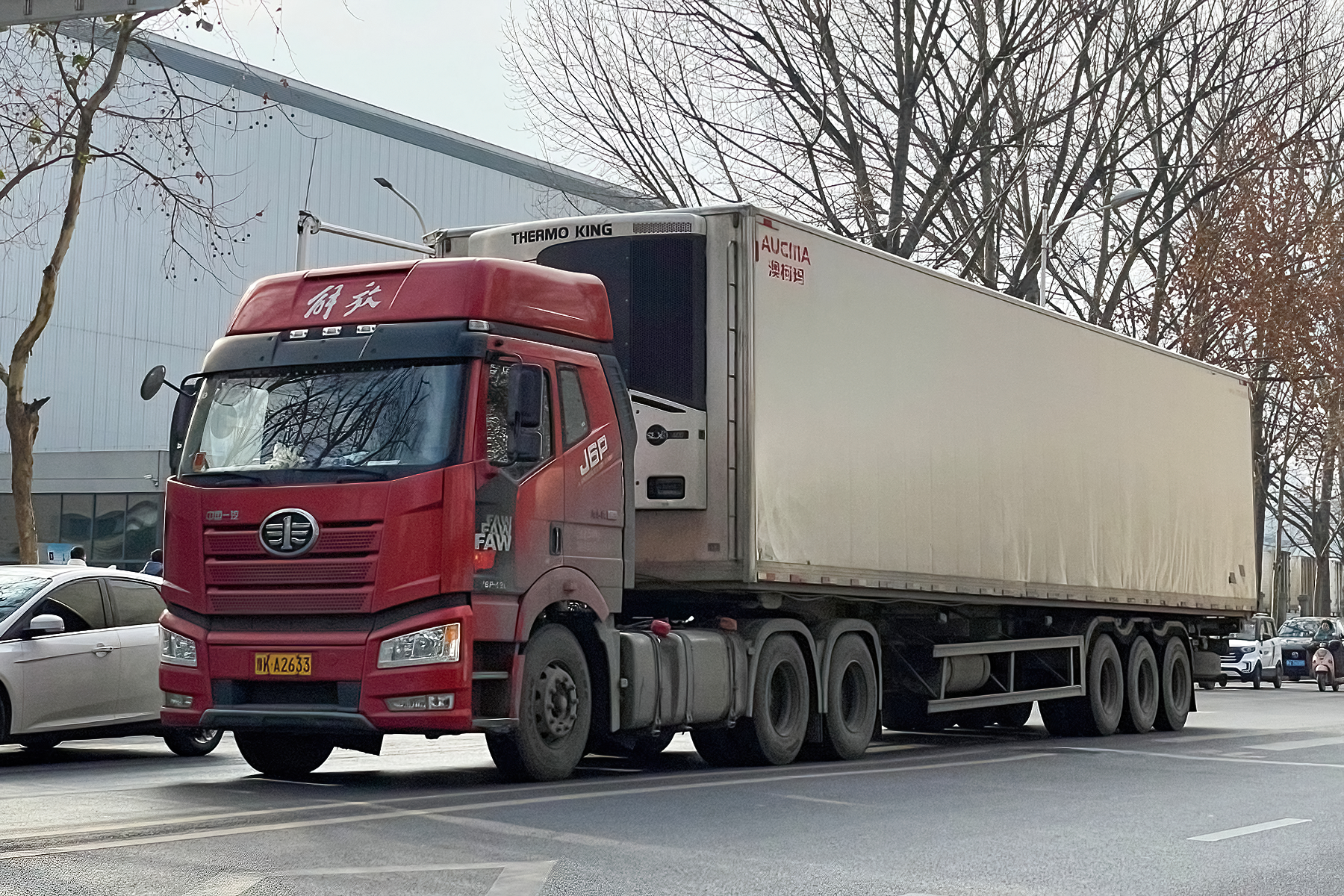
Jiefang J6P

=== Bestune (formerly Besturn) ===
Bestune was established on August 18, 2006, It may also be known as Ben Teng. It serves as the passenger car brand in FAW Group.

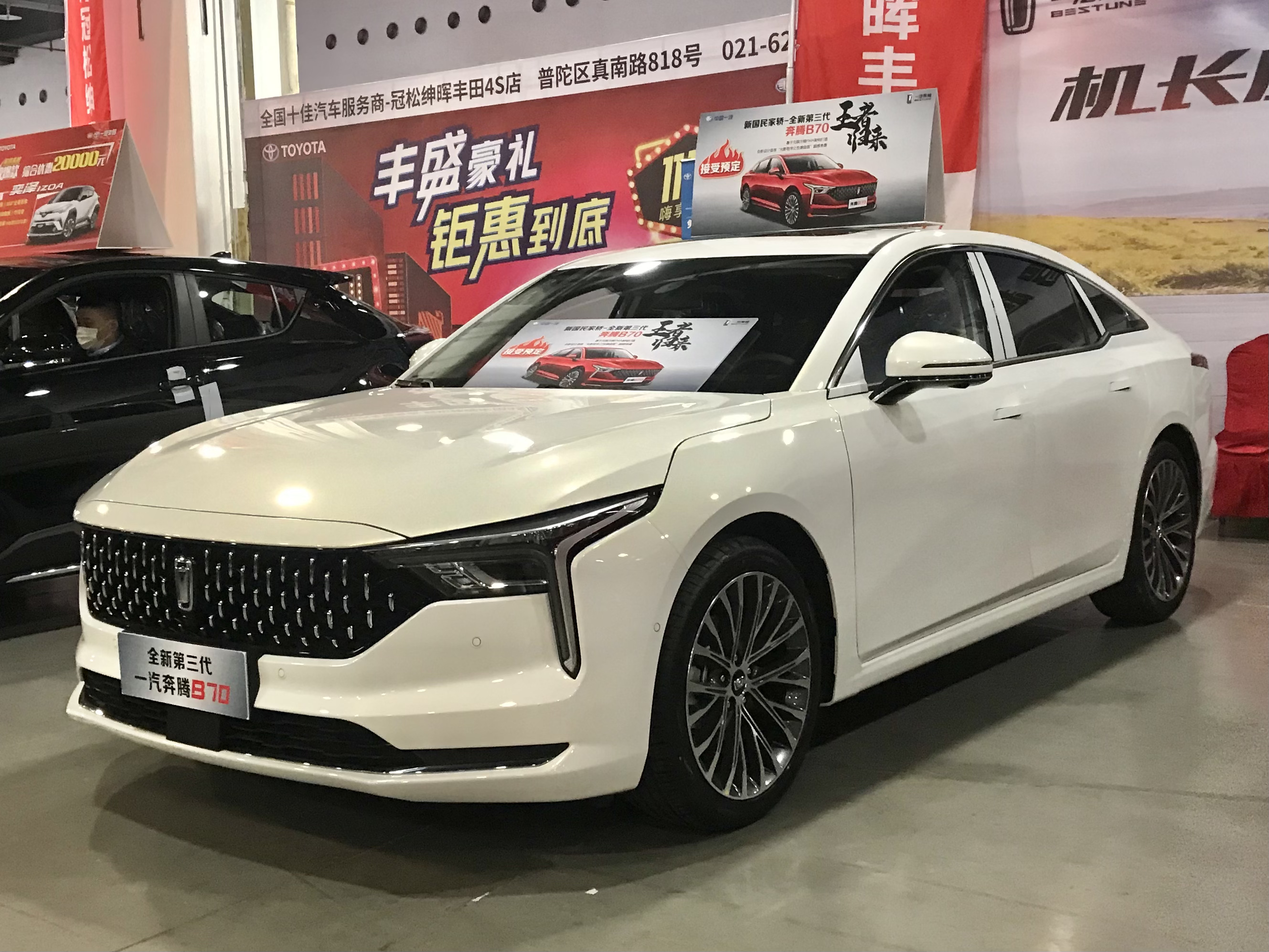
Bestune B70

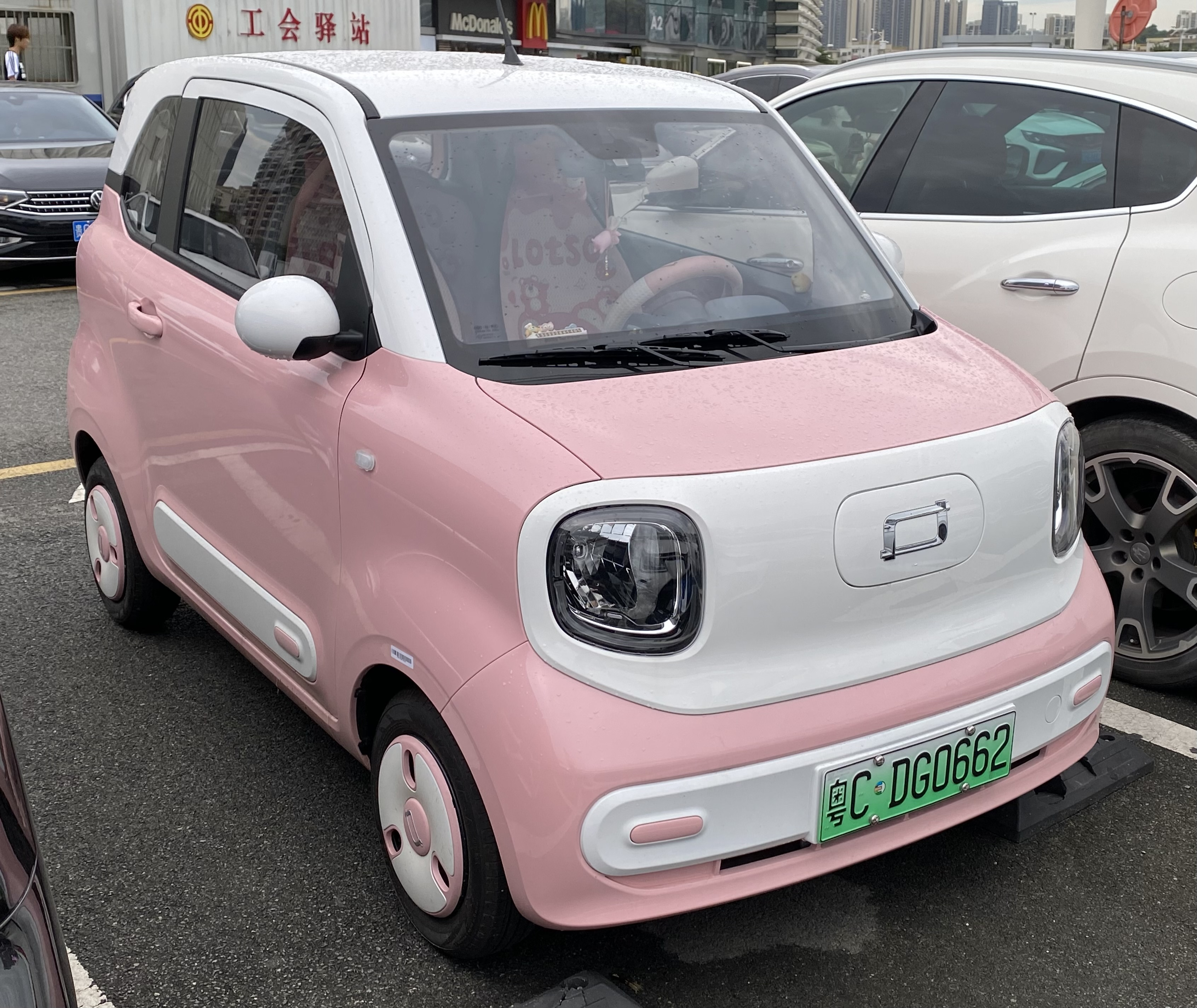
Bestune Pony

=== Yueyi ===
Yueyi was originally a product line under Bestune after the investment from Yueda Group in 2023. It became an independent brand since 2026.

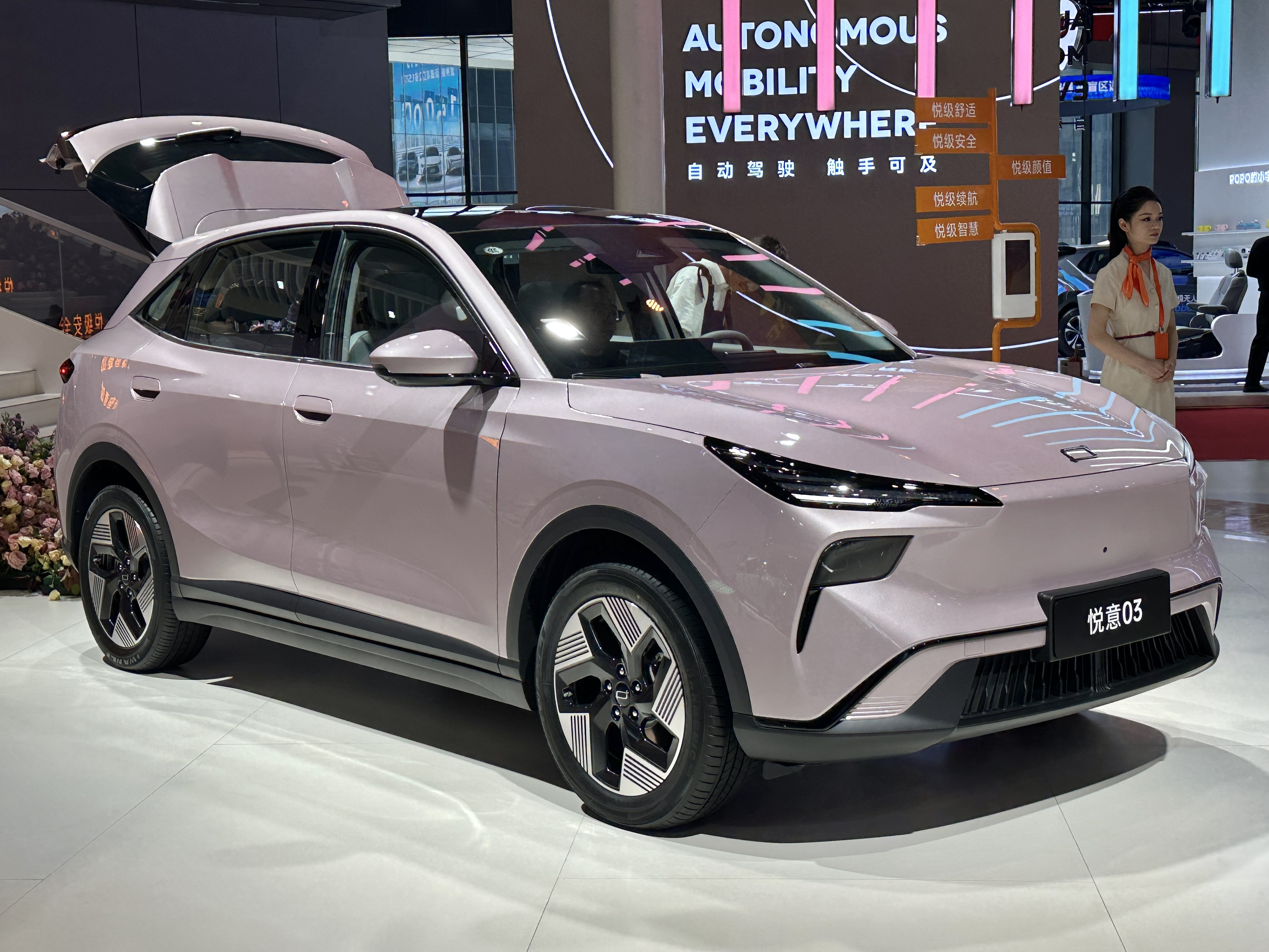
Yueyi 03

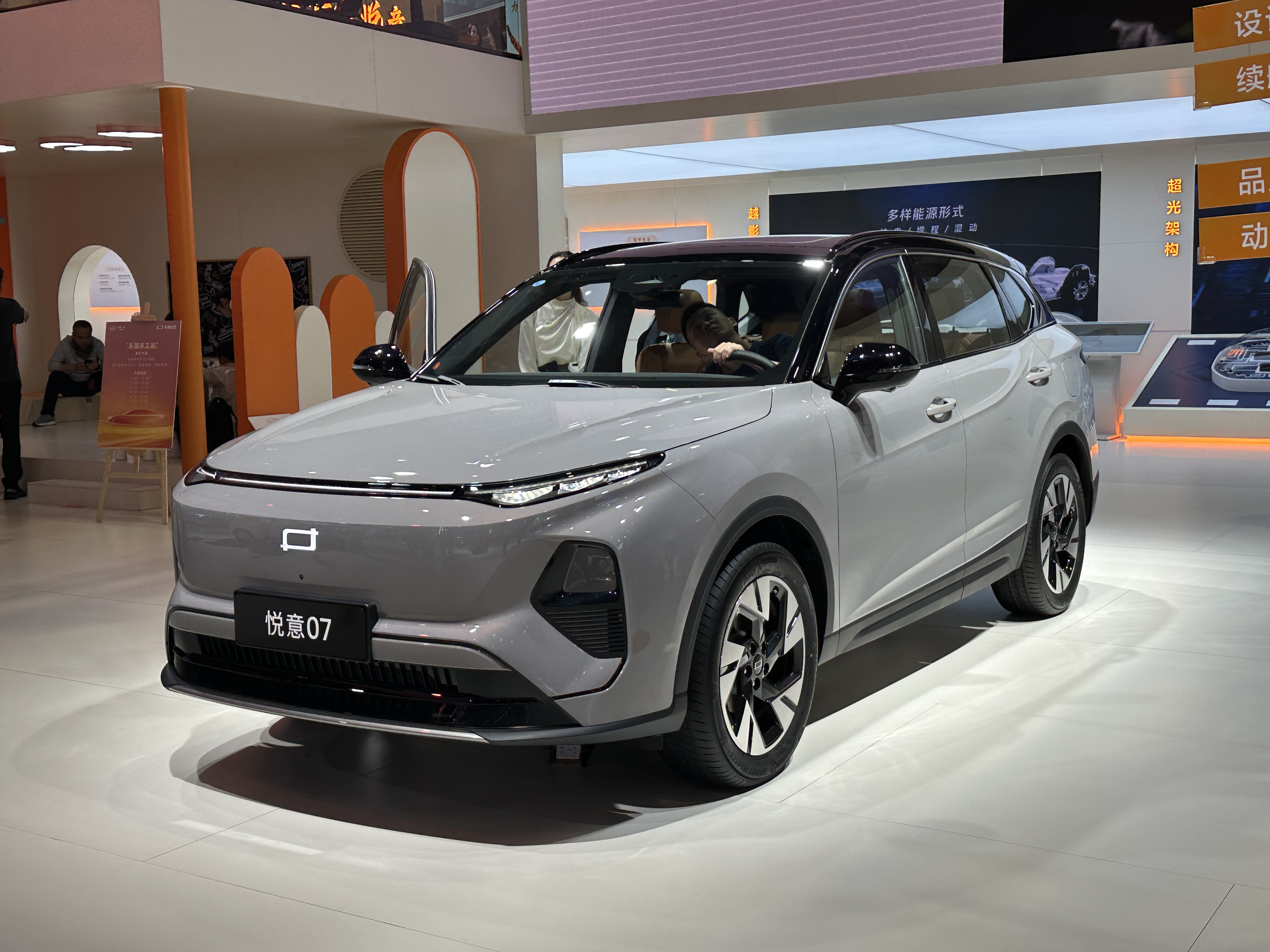
Yueyi 07

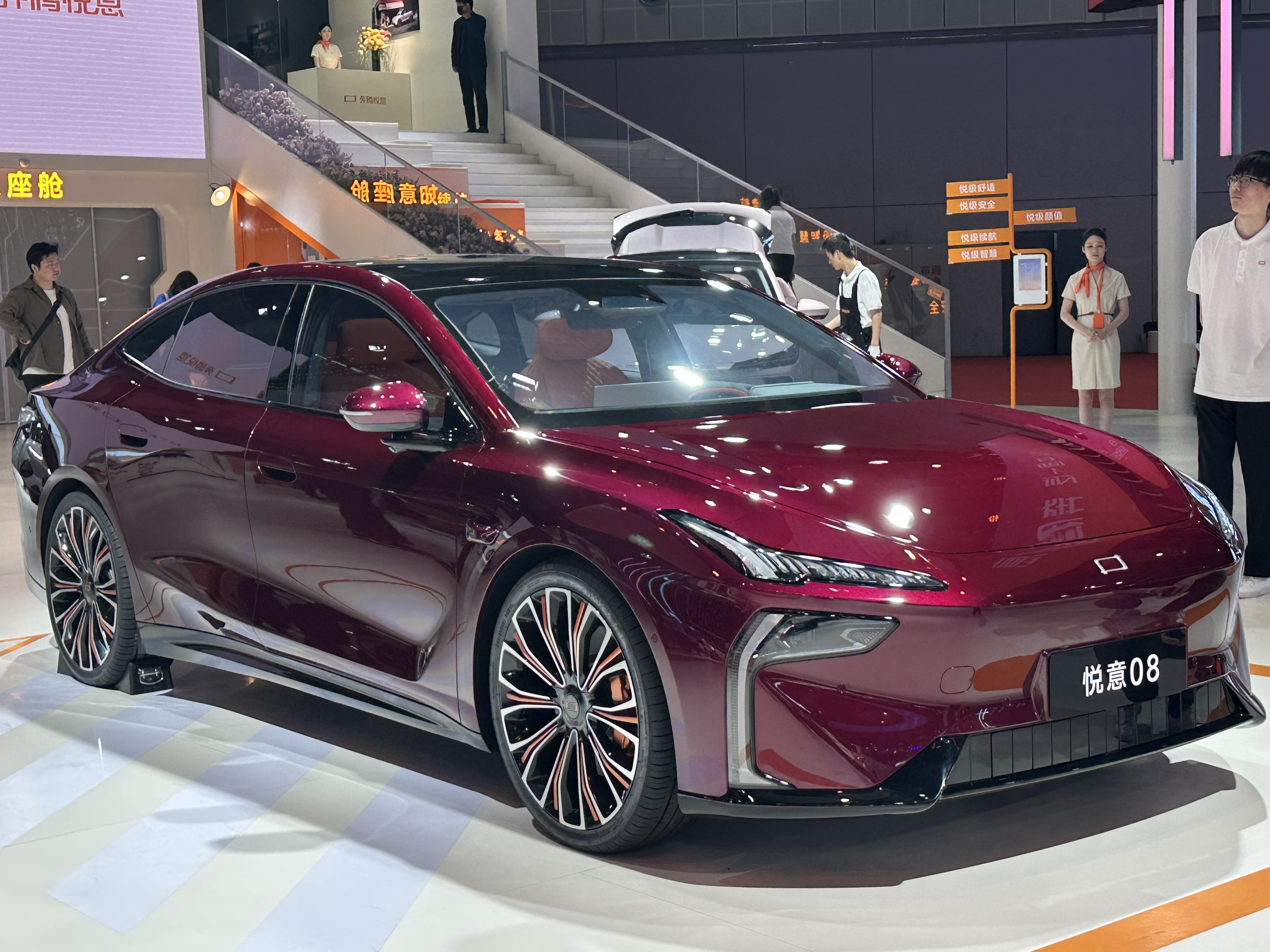
Yueyi 08

=== FAW discontinued brands ===
- FAW Haima (divested), founded in January 1992 as Hainan Mazda Motor, a joint venture between the Hainan provincial government and Mazda to produce Mazda models for sale in China. In 2006, Mazda's share of Hainan Mazda was acquired by FAW Group, and the company became a subsidiary of FAW. In July 2021, FAW transferred 49% of the shares of FAW Haima to Hainan Development Holdings Co., Ltd. (Hainan Holdings) at no charge.
- Tianjin FAW (discontinued), Junpai, Huali, Xiali (discontinued), Jiaxing (discontinued)
- FAW Jilin (discontinued), a maker of mini-vehicles, small trucks and vans under the Senia and Jiabao brands.
- Oley (discontinued), a newer brand that was targeting young buyers. Defunct in 2015.
- SiTech (discontinued), a brand that focuses on electric vehicles. Established in 2018 with the first car called SiTech DEV1 launched.
- Pengxiang
- Shenli
- Yuan Zheng
- FAC (marque), FAW Lingyuan
- Baolong

FAW group sales by brand
Year	Total	FAW Group	FAW Jiefang	FAW Bestune		FAW Haima	FAW Jilin		FAW Tianjin	
Year	Total	Hongqi	Jiefang	Bestune	Oley	Haima	Senia	Jiabao	Junpai	Xiali
2010	1,038,290	193	394,739	132,212	-	140,332	48,499	70,795	-	245,920
2011	907,337	2	280,104	112,816	-	156,212	41,090	62,555	-	250,153
2012	718,327	127	230,026	72,484	6,545	131,642	41,270	49,672	-	183,976
2013	723,969	2,981	276,956	121,254	6,300	113,446	40,424	39,554	-	129,392
2014	627,006	2,708	239,450	179,453	6,933	90,426	17,666	17,776	4,041	68,018
2015	505,849	5,044	178,300	147,897	1,936	70,938	14,159	22,705	29,308	35,541
2016	505,711	5,052	231,203	105,670	863	63,029	50,440	10,612	16,595	21,909
2017	572,862	4,702	317,445	116,472	186	39,369	62,290	5,308	17,598	9,482
2018	543,986	33,028	338,302	88,708	197	22,507	36,248	3,375	17,674	11,22
2019	589,832	100,166	352,702	120,193	discontinued	4,452	5,818	683	3,771	221
2020	779,403	200,338	492,622	83,391	discontinued	2,936	discontinued		discontinued	
2021	846,803	300,638	454,426	77,218	discontinued	14,521	discontinued		discontinued	
2022	555,406	309,657	170,049	75,700	discontinued	divested	discontinued		discontinued	
2023	732,328	370,000	241,662	120,666	discontinued	divested	discontinued		discontinued	
2024	813,632	411,777	251,078	150,777	discontinued	divested	discontinued		discontinued	
2025	940,080	460,000	280,000	200,017	discontinued	divested	discontinued		discontinued	

== Joint ventures ==
=== FAW-Toyota ===
Created in 2003, FAW operates this joint venture with Japanese automaker Toyota through Tianjin FAW. Key subsidiaries include:

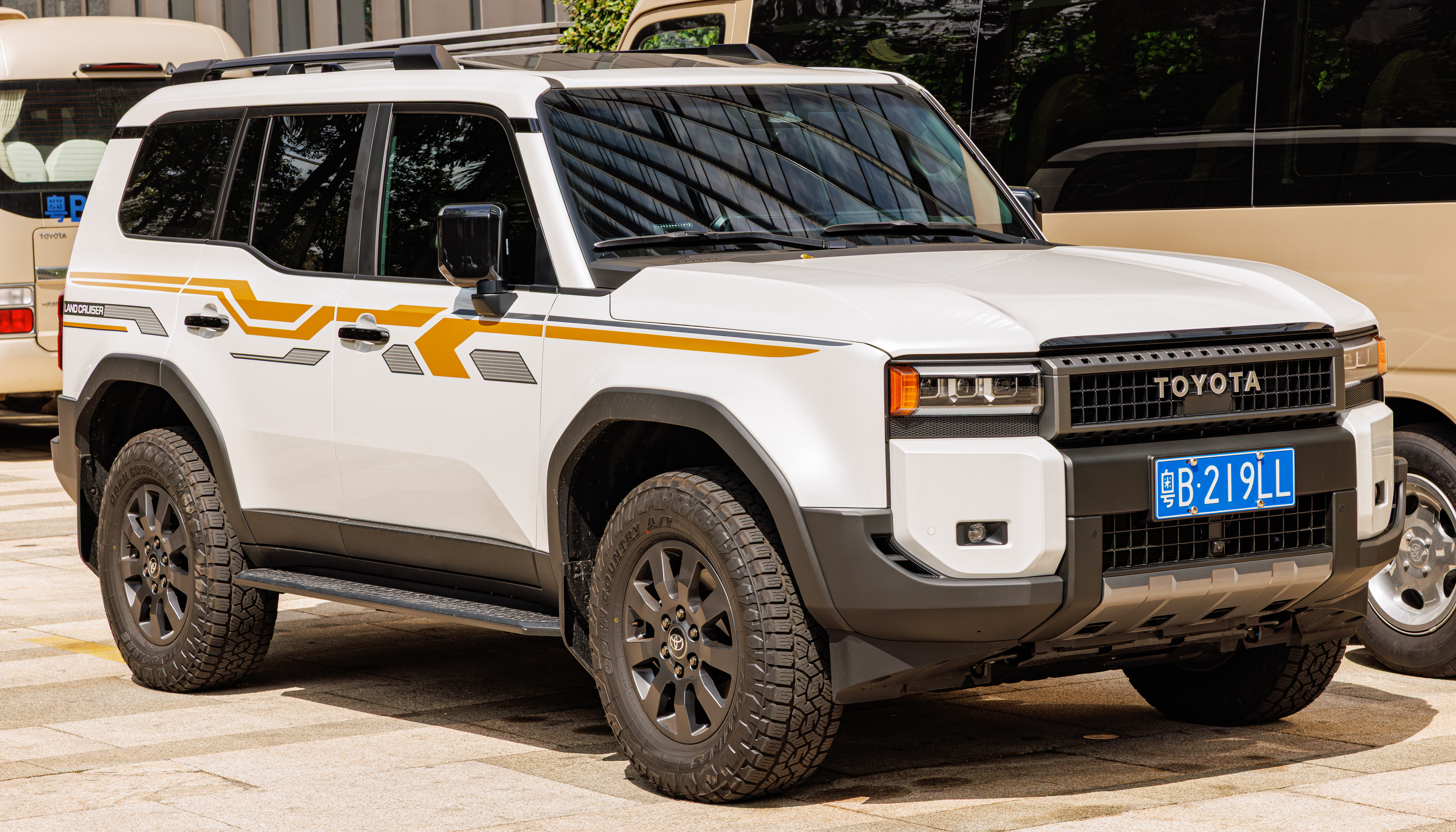
A Toyota Land Cruiser Prado produced by Sichuan FAW Toyota Motor

Sichuan FAW Toyota Motor Co

Operates a passenger car production base in the Chenghua District of Sichuan province and another in Changchun, Jilin province. As of 2008, its 10,000 units/year capacity production base in Changchun makes the Toyota Prius and Toyota Land Cruiser. The other production base it controls may make buses.

Tianjin FAW Toyota Engine Co Ltd

This equally owned joint venture with Toyota makes engines at its production bases in the Xiqing District of Tianjin and at the Tianjin Economic-Technological Development Area (Zone). Combined, both bases can produce 440,000 units annually.

FAW Toyota Changchun Engine Co Ltd

Making engines at a 130,000 units/year capacity production base in the Changchun Economic and Technology Development Zone, this equally owned joint venture was established in 2004.

=== FAW-Volkswagen Automobile Co Ltd ===
Established in 1991, this large-scale automobile manufacturer is a joint venture between FAW Group and Volkswagen AG which, as of 2003, have ownership stakes of 60% and 40%, respectively. It manufactures Audi and Volkswagen-branded automobiles for sale in China.

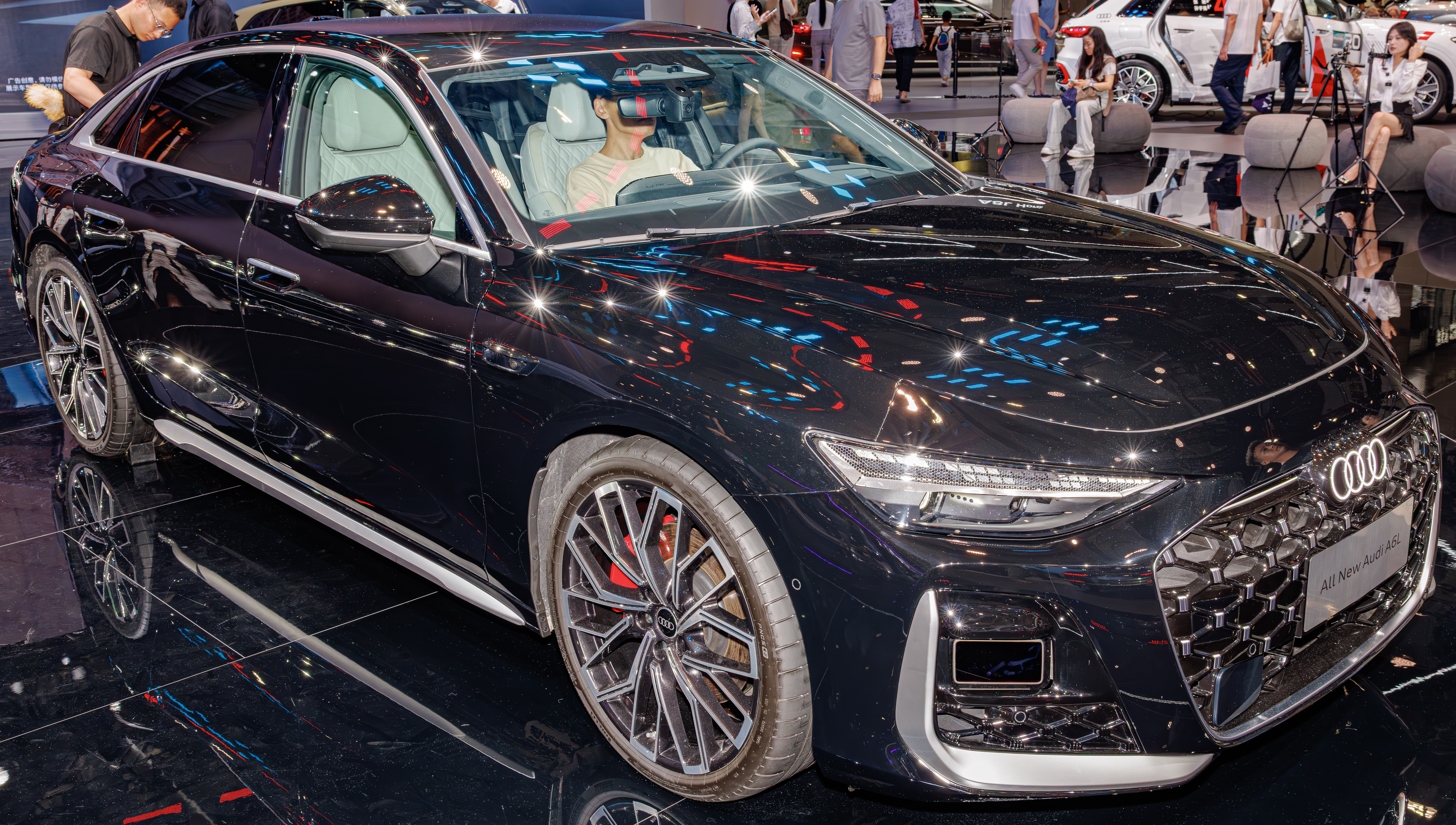
Audi A6L

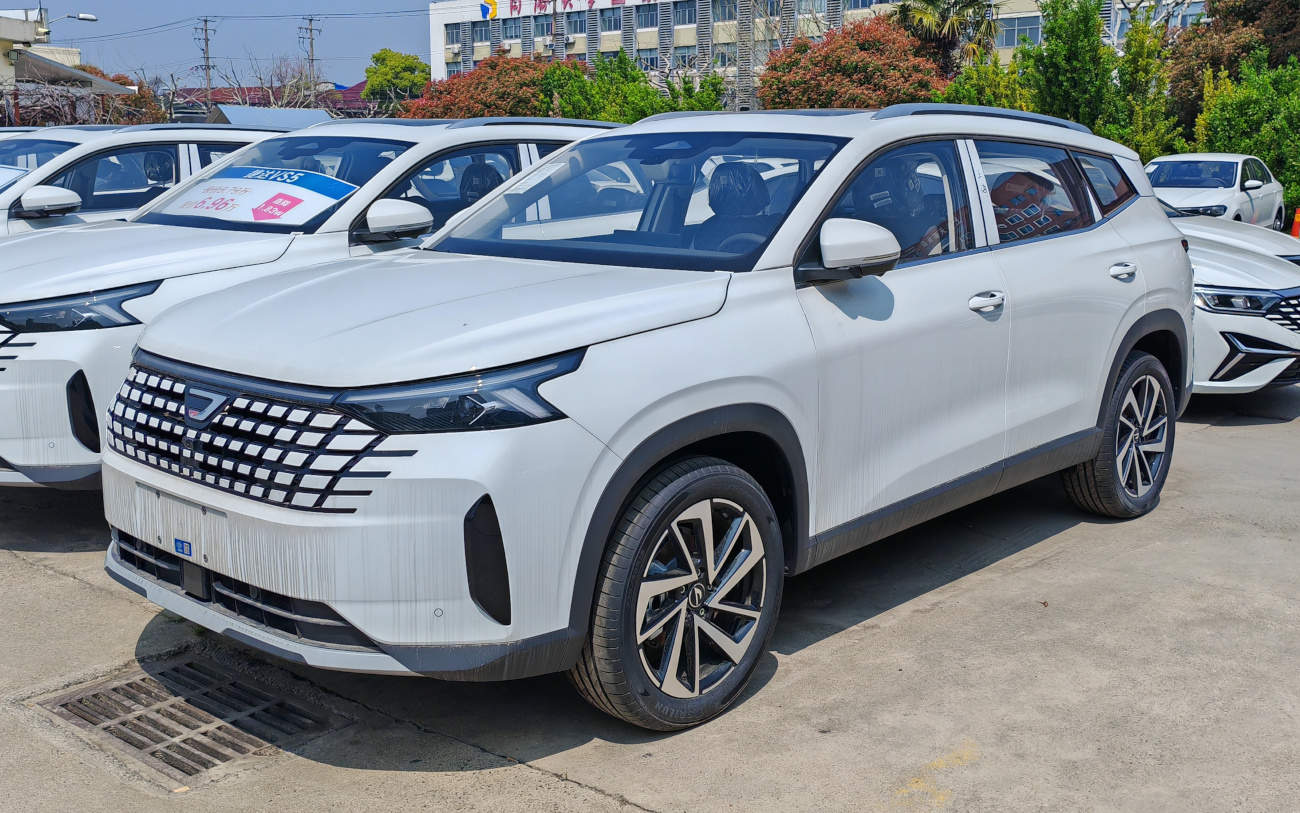
Jetta VS8

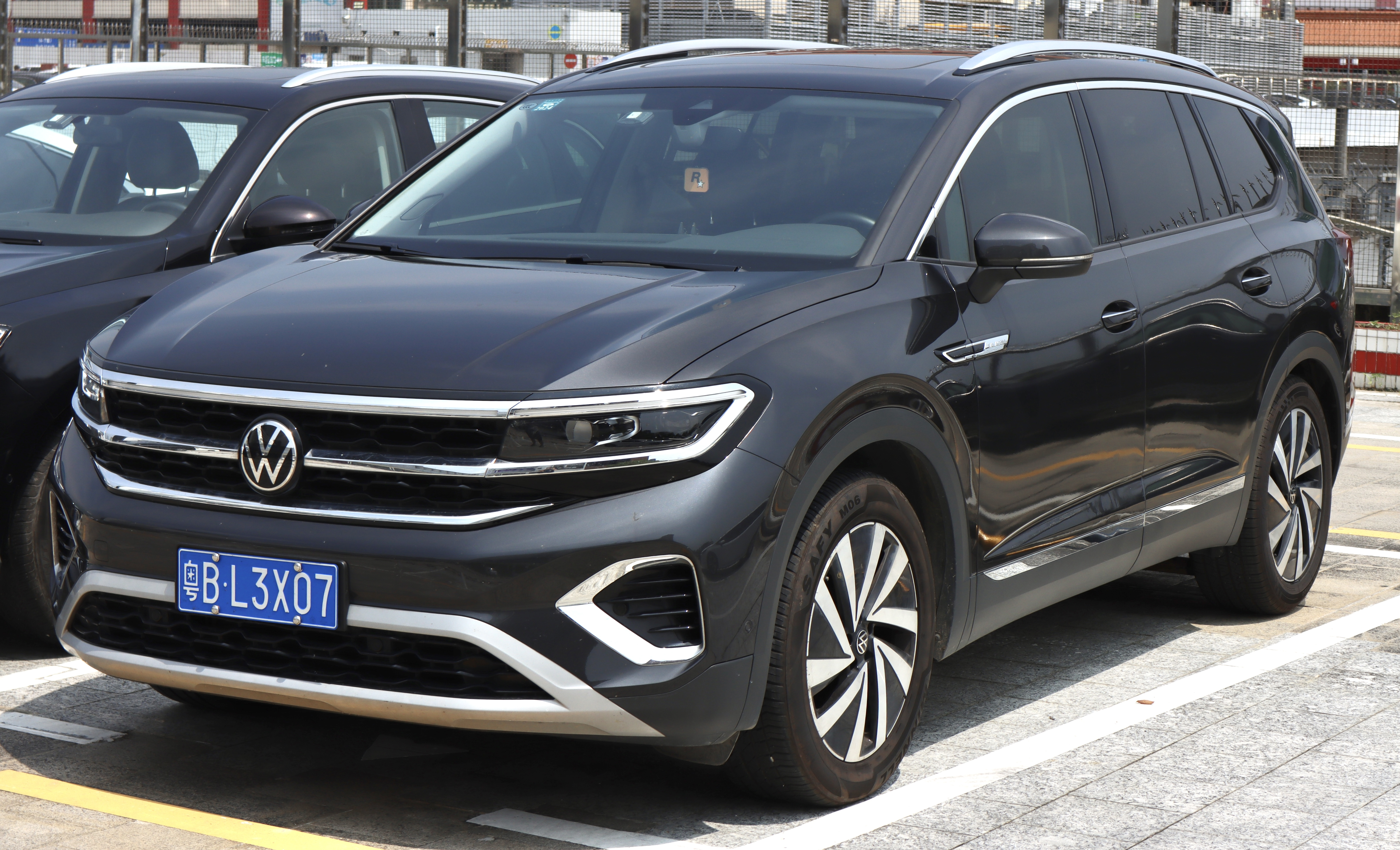
Volkswagen Talagon

Chengdu FAW Co Ltd

This subsidiary of FAW's joint venture with VW controls production bases in Chengdu, Sichuan province.

=== Audi FAW NEV ===
Audi FAW NEV Company (Chinese: 奥迪一汽新能源汽车有限公司), commonly known as Audi FAW, is a Chinese electric vehicle manufacturer headquartered in Changchun, Jilin province. Established in 2021 as a joint venture between German automaker Audi and Chinese state-owned FAW Group, it represents Audi's first majority-controlled new energy vehicle partnership in China.

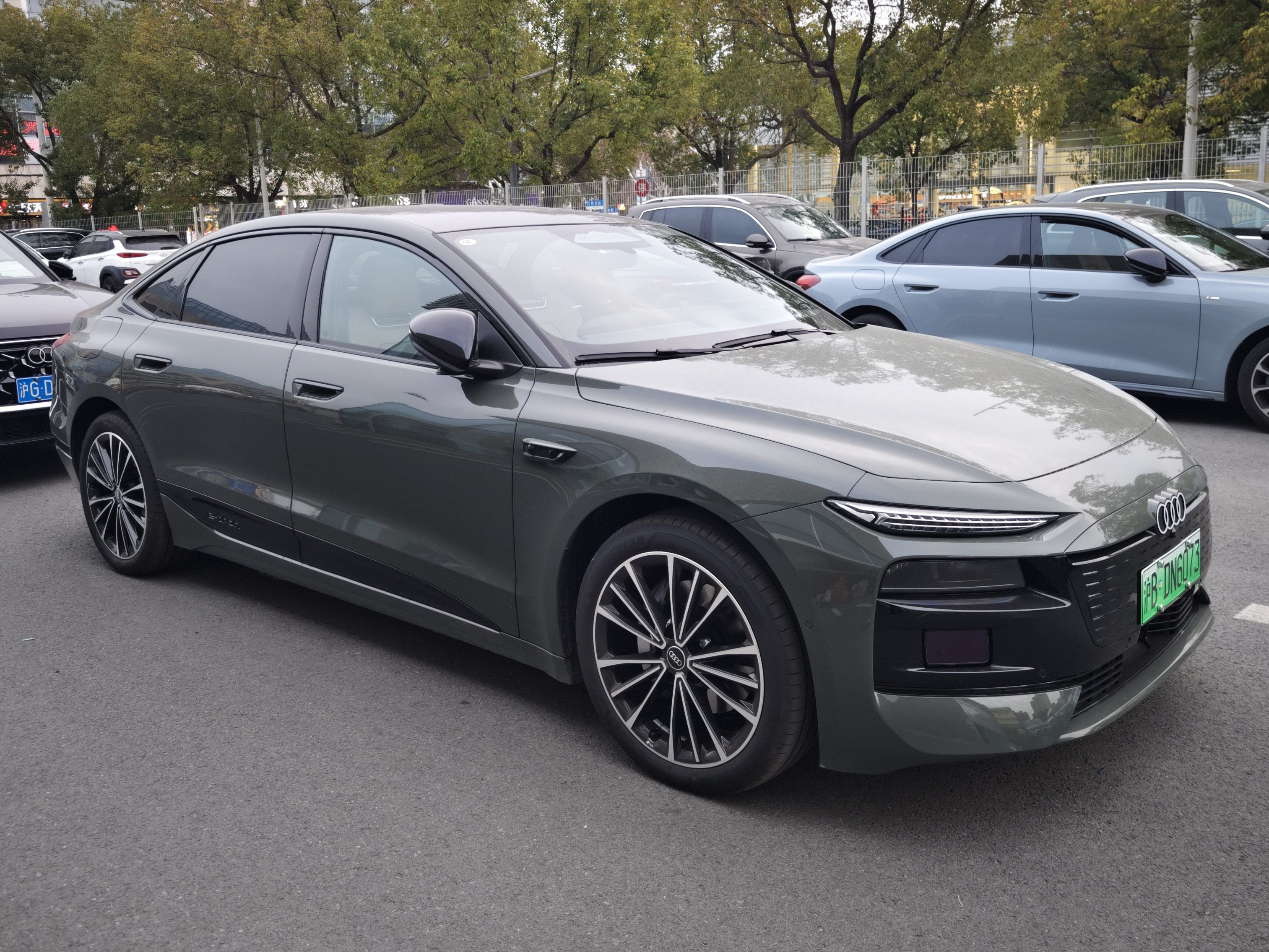
Audi A6L e-tron

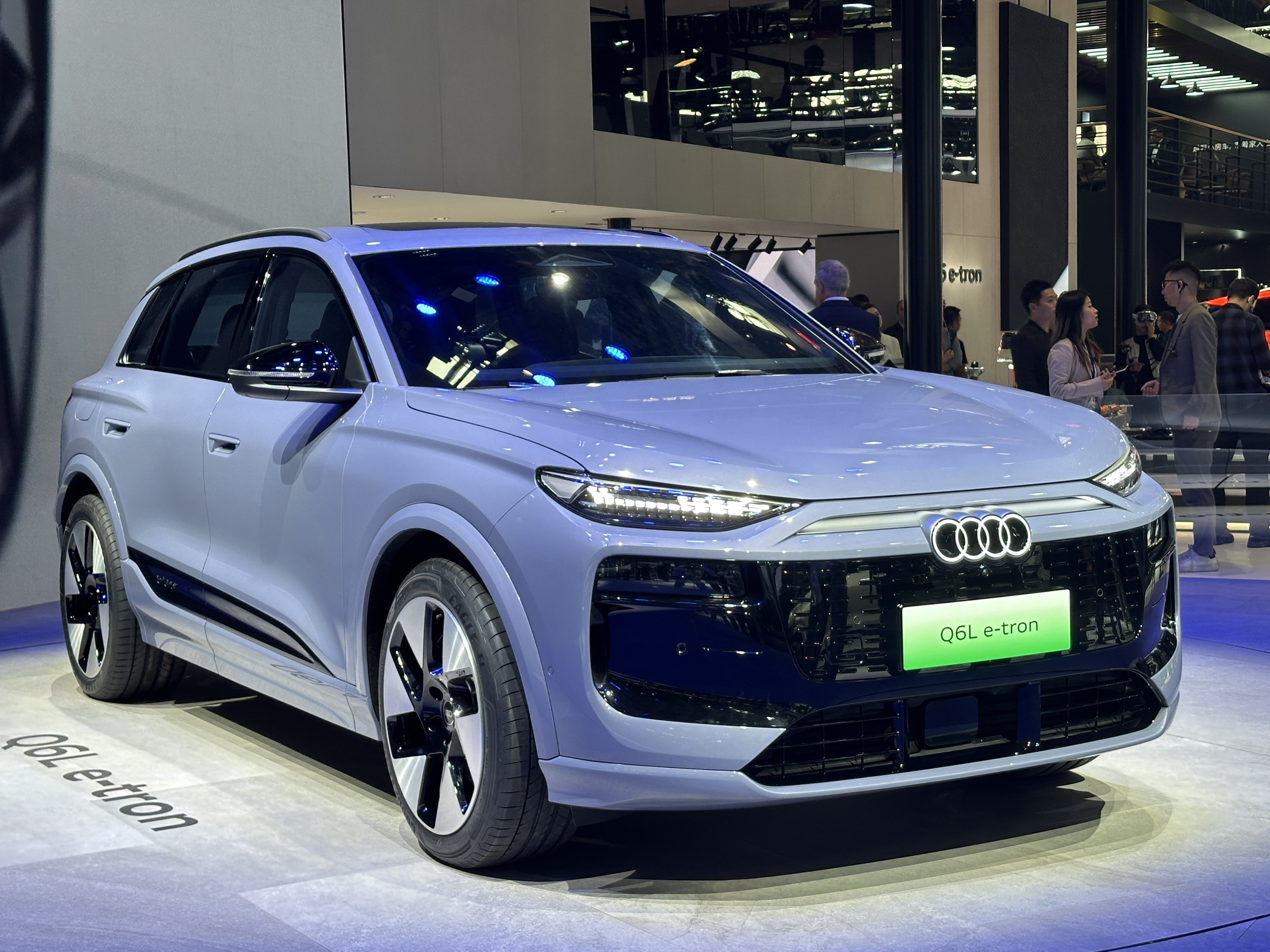
Audi Q6L e-tron

=== FAW-GM ===
A joint venture with General Motors that mainly produces Jiefang light-duty trucks, this JV includes the Harbin Light Vehicle and FAW Hongta Yunnan factories.

FAW-GM Light Duty Commercial Vehicle Co Ltd

This joint venture with General Motors mainly produces Jiefang light-duty trucks.

=== Silk-FAW Automotive ===
This joint venture with US based design firm Silk EV produces high end luxury hybrid sports cars.

== Strategic investment ==
Leapmotor (5% stake)

- In December 2025, Leapmotor announced that FAW Group would acquire 5% of its shares for 3.744 billion yuan. Following this acquisition, the stake held by Zhu Jiangming and other shareholders, who together form the single largest shareholder group, will dilute from 23.75% to 22.56%, while Stellantis' stake will decrease from 19.99% to 18.99%. The investment funds from FAW will be allocated in proportions of 50%, 25%, and 25% for research and development, supplementing working capital and general corporate purposes, and expanding the sales and service network while enhancing brand awareness, respectively.

== Subsidiaries and divisions ==
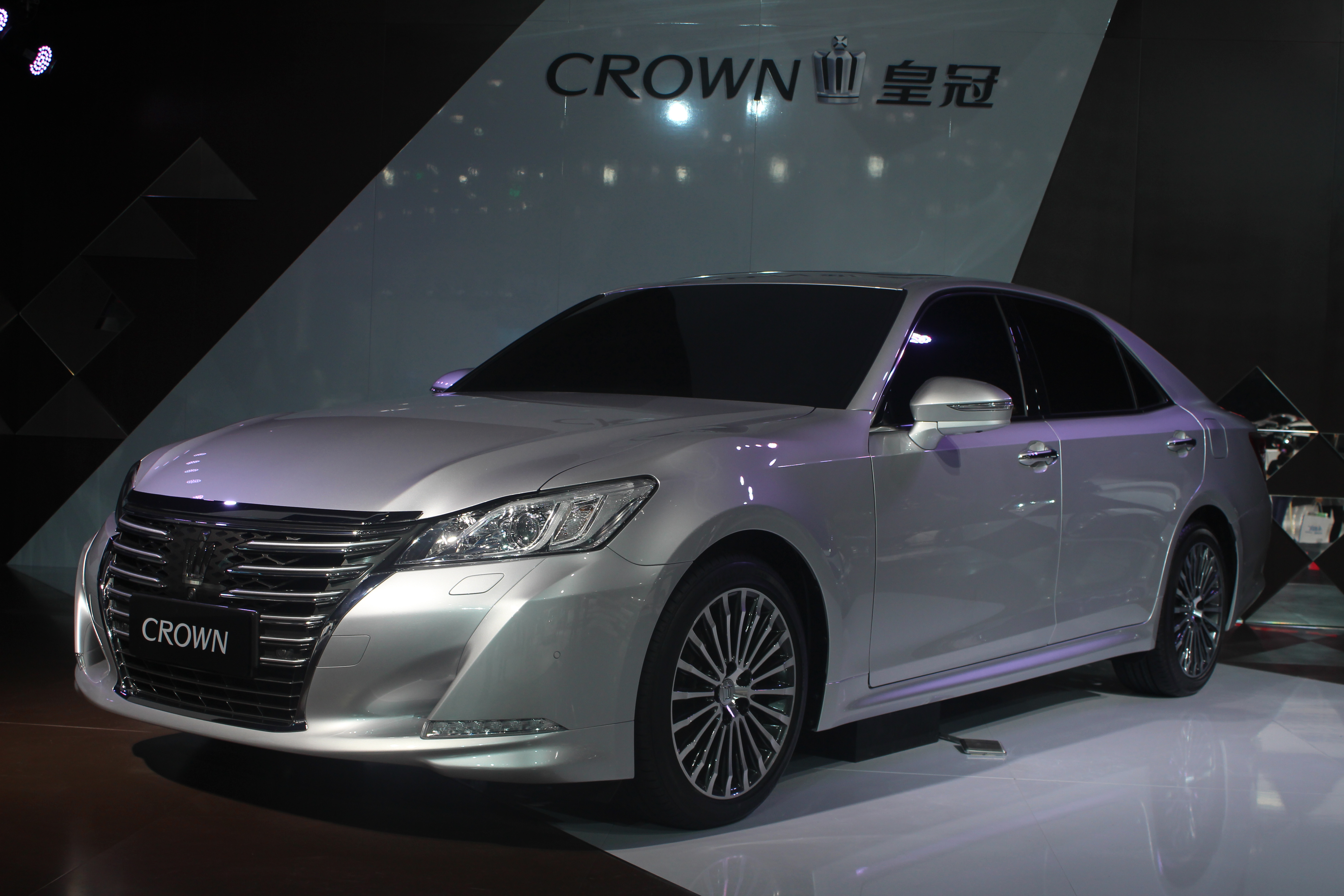
FAW Toyota Crown

FAW has at least 28 wholly owned subsidiaries and controlling shares in 18 partly owned subsidiaries. These include the wholly owned subsidiaries FAW Jiefang Truck Co Ltd and FAW Bus and Coach Co Ltd, and the publicly traded FAW Car Co Ltd, Tianjin FAW Xiali Automobile Co Ltd, and Changchun FAWAY Automobile Components Co Ltd.

Below is an incomplete list.

=== Vehicle-producing divisions ===
==== Chengdu FAW Automobile Co Ltd ====
Chengdu FAW produces Huaxi brand light and medium buses based on the Toyota Coaster. Originally the Sichuan Bus Company, it became a partly owned subsidiary in 2002 after acquisition by FAW.

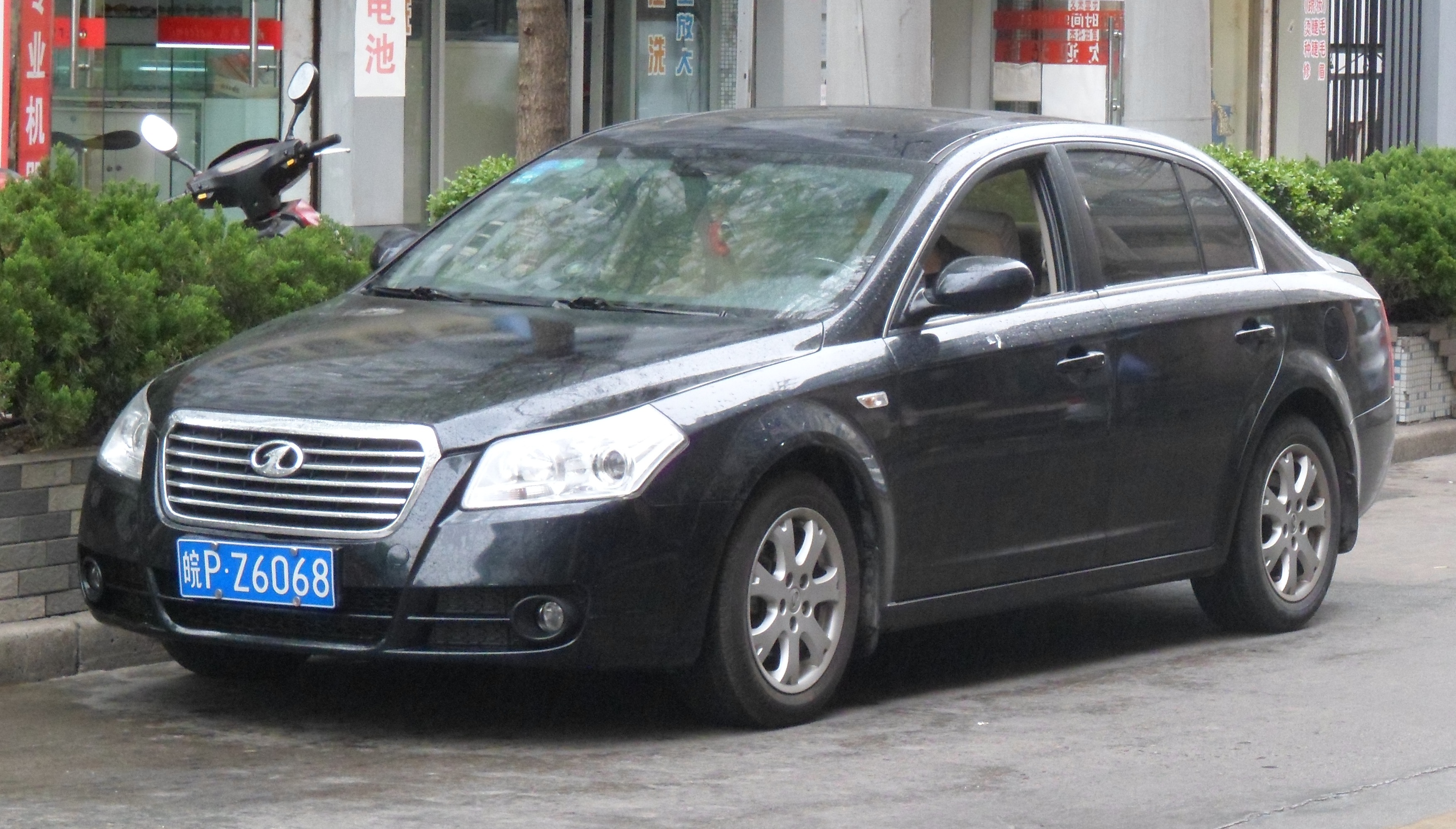
A Besturn B70 produced by FAW Car Company

==== FAW Car Co Ltd ====
Created in 1997 from the merger of Changchun Gear Factory, the FAW No. 2 Engine Factory, the FAW No. 2 Car Factory, and the former FAW No. 1 Car Factory, this publicly listed subsidiary produces cars, transmissions, and engines. It has a production base in western Changchun, Jilin province.

==== FAW Bus and Coach ====
Founded in 1959, it produces buses sold under the Taihu brand.

==== FAW Hongta Yunnan Automobile Co Ltd ====
Created in 1997 when FAW purchased a controlling interest in Hongta Yunnan Automobile Co Ltd, this subsidiary company, as of 2003, produces 1/2-3 ton pickups, light trucks, and license-built Daihatsu models. This factory was included in the FAW-GM Light Duty Commercial Vehicle joint venture.

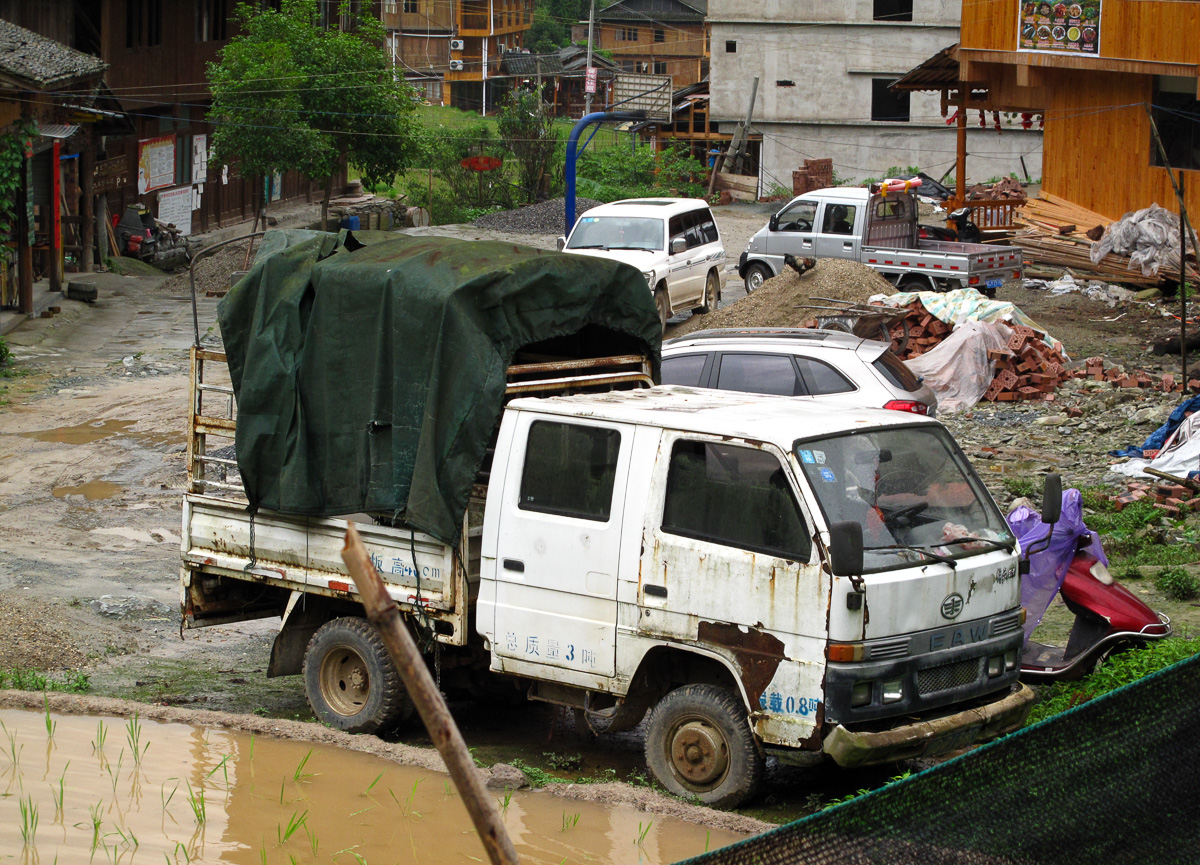
FAW Hongta Lanjian Jiefang

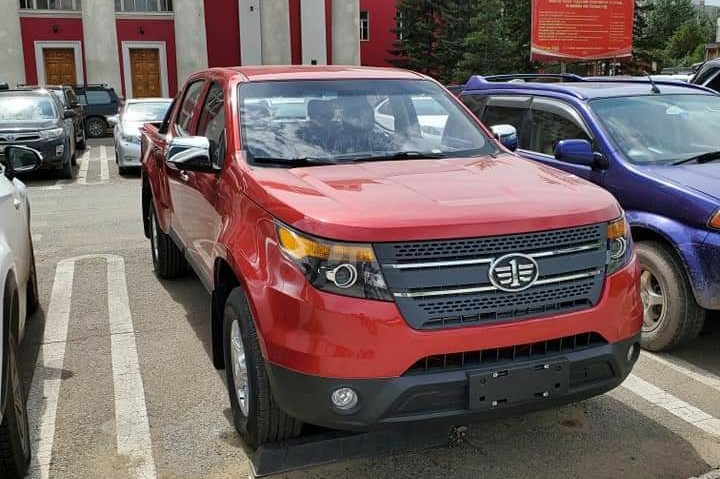
FAW Hongta T340

==== FAW Jilin Automobile Co Ltd ====
Founded in 1980, this company became a wholly owned subsidiary of FAW Group in either 1987 or March 1991. It manufactures compact trucks and buses originally based on Suzukis. More recently, Jilin participated in a five-year-long joint venture with Daihatsu.

==== FAW Passenger Vehicle Co ====
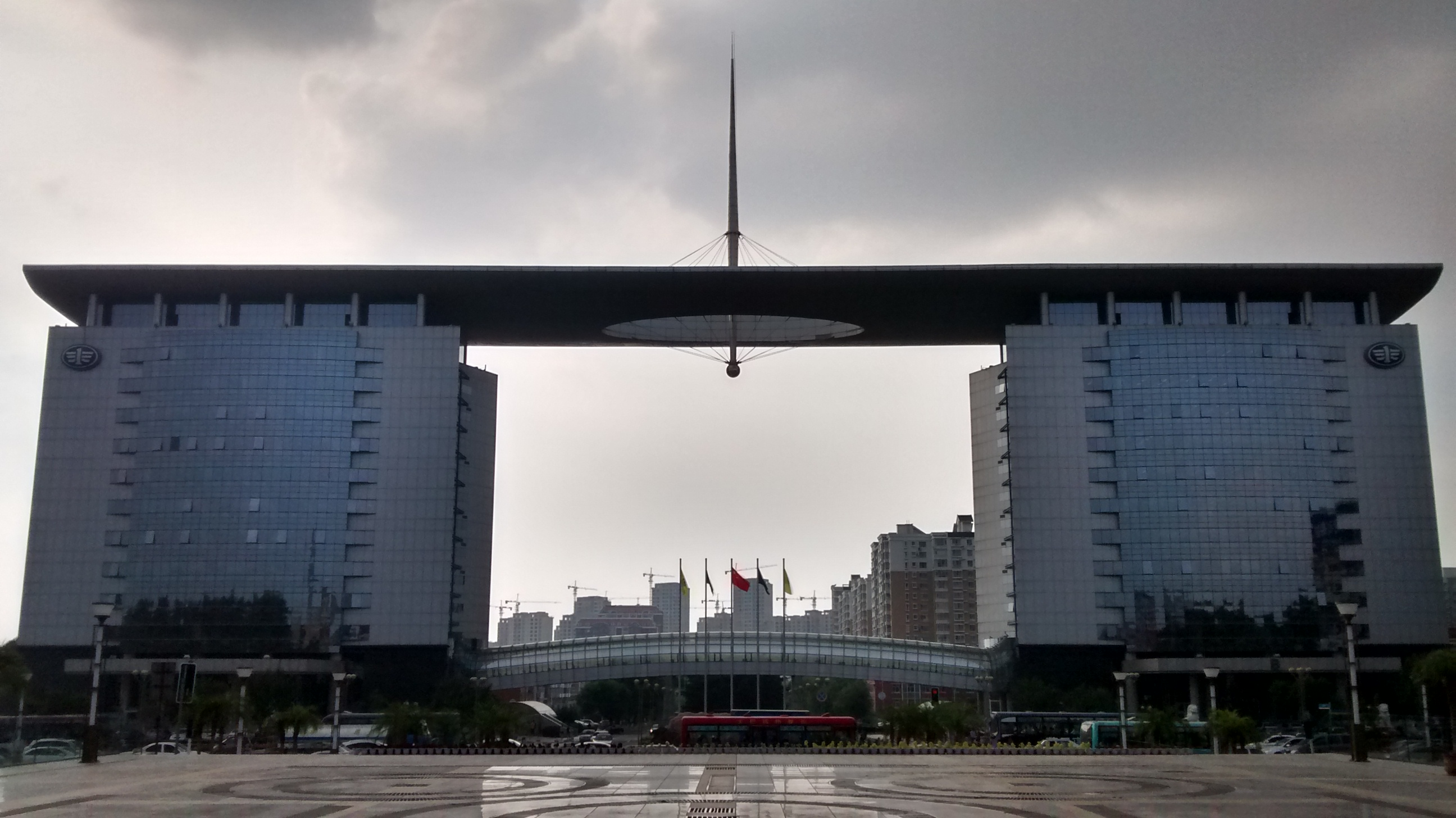
FAW Group Corporation Main Building

As of 2012, this company has two factories and some of the products it produces carry the Oley brand.

==== FAW Sichuan Automotive Co Ltd ====
Established in 1997, this part-owned subsidiary designs, produces, and markets medium and heavy truck bodies, wheels, and components for both FAW and other manufacturers.

==== The Harbin Light Vehicle Factory ====
Established in 1965, this FAW Group subsidiary made military vehicles until partnering with FAW in the 1990s. It has since produced pickups, Jiefang trucks, and mini-vehicles (small trucks and vans that see commercial use). This factory was included in the FAW-GM Light Duty Commercial Vehicle joint venture.

=== Other divisions ===
- The 9th Industrial Machinery Design and Research Institute - Wholly owned subsidiary since 1958, responsible for production base design.
- FAW Forging Co Ltd - Producing die and hand-forged auto parts, this subsidiary was established on 31 May 2000.
- FAW Foundry Co Ltd - This wholly owned subsidiary produces cast auto parts including engine blocks.
- FAW Jiaxin Heat Treatment and Electroplate Technology Co Ltd - This wholly owned subsidiary designs and manufactures complete heat treatment and electroplating systems.
- FAW Qiming Information Technology Co Ltd - Established in 2000, this subsidiary company is responsible for GPS research and development, business development, sales and marketing, after sales support, and system integration. A vehicle-monitoring division of its GPS research & development arm used a system purchased from Avaya to, "monitor over 3,000 vehicles throughout China".
- FAW Tool Co Ltd - This wholly owned subsidiary specializes in development and production of non-standard tools for automotive manufacture.
- FAW Tool and Die Co Ltd - Manufacturing automotive dies is the main responsibility of this wholly owned subsidiary.
- Dalian Diesel Engine Co - Produces engines for commercial trucks, construction equipment, and agricultural machinery. In 1986, 35 years after its inception, this company became a wholly owned subsidiary of FAW.
- FAW Import and Export Corporation (FAWIE) - Established as a subsidiary in 1984, FAWIE is the international sales and marketing division of FAW Group. Overseas joint ventures and technical cooperation with foreign countries are also within its remit. This subsidiary has established overseas production facilities in Pakistan, South Africa, Tanzania, Ukraine, Vietnam, and Russia.

=== Minor joint ventures ===
- Chengdu Araco Automobile Trim Part Co Ltd - This joint venture with Japan's ARACO produces interior trim parts.
- FAWER Automotive Component Co Ltd - Operated with American auto-parts maker Visteon, produces air-conditioning units at a facility in the Changchun Automotive Development Zone
- FAW Bharat Forging Co Ltd - A joint venture with India's Bharat Forge Ltd, it manufactures forged products including automotive components for passenger cars, buses, commercial vehicles, and others for railway, mining, steel, and petroleum industries.
- FAW Huali (Tianjin) Automobile Co Ltd - A joint venture with Tianjin Automotive Industry (Group) Co Ltd that, since 2003, has manufactured Daihatsu models sold under the brand name Dario. As of 2008, it continues to produce Daihatsu models, has a 10,000 units per year production capacity, and is majority owned by FAW with a 75% ownership stake.
- Wuhu FAW Yangzi Automobile Co Ltd - This joint venture with Yangzi Group and Wuhu Automotive Industry Company manufactures trucks, custom bus chassis, and medium-size buses.
- Changchun Fawer-Johnson - A joint venture between FAW Sichuan and Johnson Controls, it produces a wide range of interior components including automotive seats and trim.

== Production bases and facilities ==
FAW has production bases located in 14 provinces throughout China including the provinces of Guangdong, Hainan, Heilongjiang, Jilin, Liaoning, Shandong, Sichuan, and Yunnan. Non-provincial locales include Pudong and Tianjin.

=== Changchun ===
FAW headquarters are located in Changchun, Jilin province, and operations here include an R&D and test center. Also, FAW has two production bases here: one produces for the FAW-Volkswagen joint venture and the other makes self-branded autos.

=== Chengdu ===
An unfinished production base in the Longquan Economic Development Zone in Chengdu, Sichuan province, replaces an older Sichuan base and will produce passenger cars for a FAW-Toyota joint venture, Tianjin FAW Toyota Motor Co Ltd, when it is completed in 2010.

FAW Jiefang Truck Co Ltd also has a production base here.

Another site in Chengdu produces cars for FAW-Volkswagen, and a second VW production base is, as of 2009, scheduled to be built in the city.

=== Dalian ===
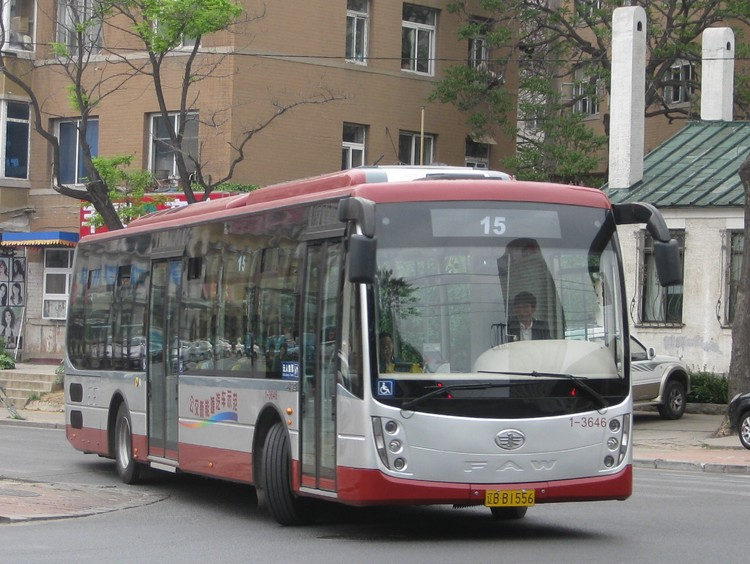
A hybrid electric bus produced by FAW Bus and Coach Co Ltd in Dalian

The Dalian division of FAW Bus and Coach Co Ltd manufactures Jiefang and Yuan Zheng brand medium and large-size buses in a production base in Dalian, Liaoning province. An unfinished bus production base in at the Dalian Economic & Technological Development Zone is expected to be complete in mid-2010 and will produce hybrid buses.

Another Dalian base produces engines for commercial trucks, construction equipment, and agricultural machinery.

=== Foshan ===
As of 2010, 150,000 units/year production capacity FAW-VW production base will soon be built in this Guangdong province city.

=== Hainan ===
Located in the sunny, southern vacation spot of Hainan island and built in 1958, Hainan Island Test Grounds is an auto testing site that includes a test track. FAW Hainan Automobile Co Ltd operates FAW's southernmost production facility here.

A production base on the island manufactures license-built Mazdas.

=== Harbin ===
A planned production base at the Aviation & Automobile Development Zone (Pingfang Development Zone) in the city of Harbin, Heilongjiang province, will see completion in December 2010 and produce light trucks.

=== Shanghai ===
FAW Jiefang Truck Co Ltd has a production base in Pudong New Area in Shanghai.

=== Tianjin ===
Plants No. 1, 2, and 3 in the city of Tianjin produce automobiles for the FAW-Toyota joint venture Tianjin FAW Toyota Motor Co Ltd. Plant No. 1 is in Yangliuqing Town, Xiqing District, and plants No. 2 and 3 are located in the Tianjin Economic and Technological Development Zone and began production in 2007. Tianjin FAW Toyota Motor Co Ltd also has an engine plant in Tianjin.

=== Qingdao ===
A FAW Jiefang Truck Co Ltd medium, heavy, and severe-duty truck production base is located in Qingdao, Shandong province.

== Export and overseas sales ==
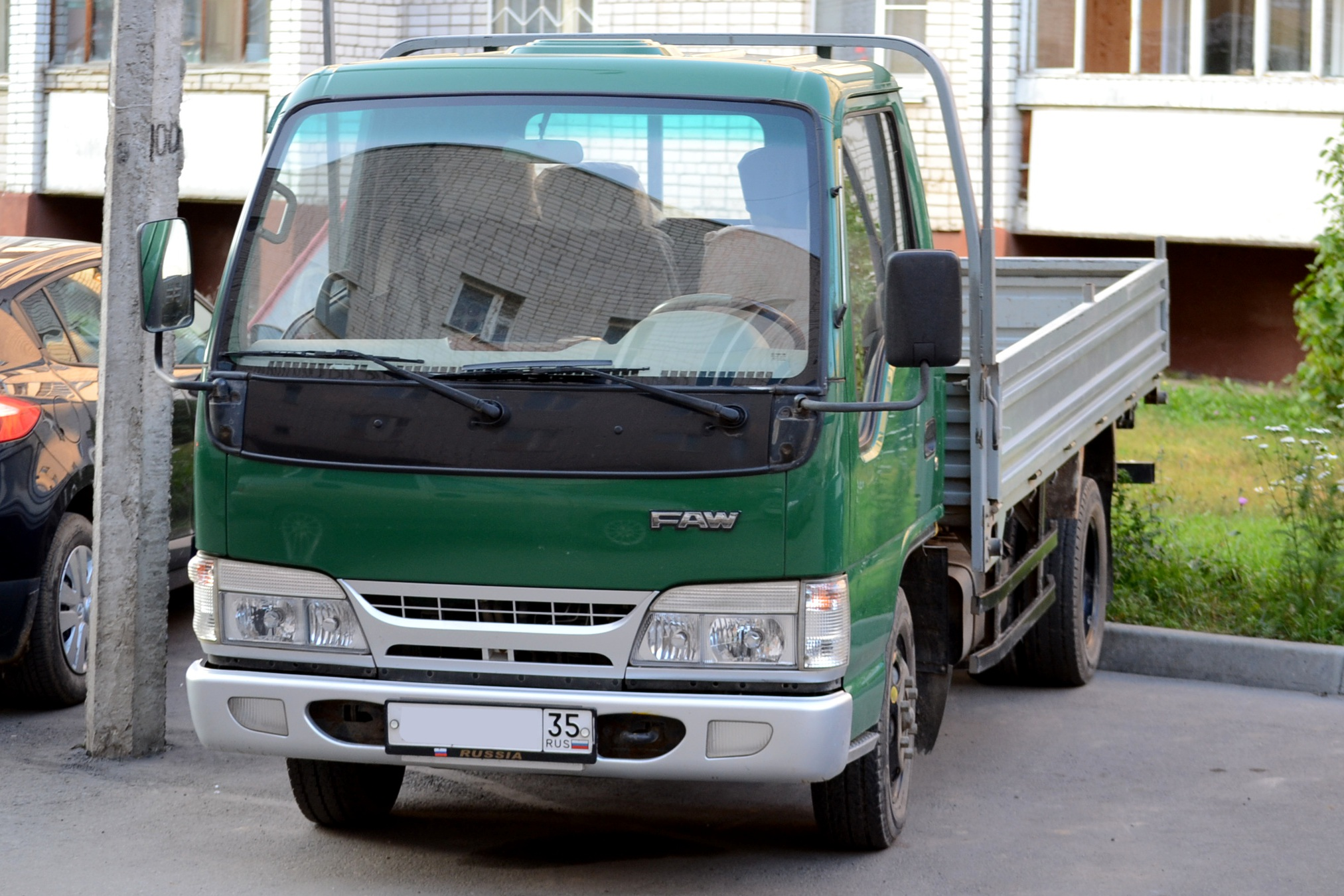
A FAW CA1031 truck in Russia

While primarily manufacturing products for sale in its home market, FAW began exports to foreign countries in 1957 with the sale of three commercial trucks to a businessperson in Jordan. FAW has shipped its products to more than eighty nations, including Egypt, Iraq, Kenya, Mexico, Myanmar, Pakistan, Russia, South Africa, Iran, Zimbabwe and Uruguay.

NAZ-Nakhchivan Automobile Plant has assembled FAW cars in Nakhchivan, Azerbaijan, since 2020.

== See also ==
- Dongfeng Motor
- China Changan Automobile
- Automobile manufacturers and brands of China
- List of automobile manufacturers of China
- Automotive industry in China
