= FAW Oley =

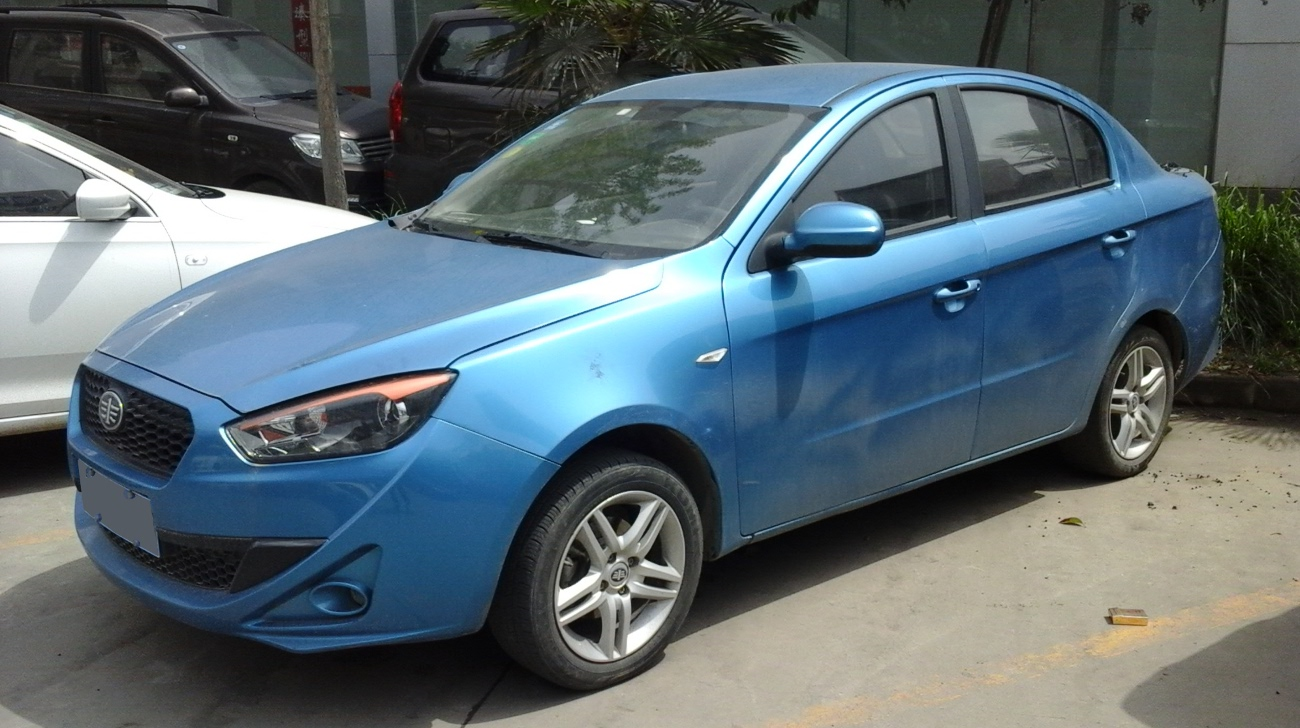
- FAW Oley sedan in China

Overview
- Manufacturer: FAW Group - Junpai
- Also called: Pyeonghwa Hwiparam 1516 (North Korea)
- Production: 2012–2016
- Assembly: Tianjin, China

Body and chassis
- Class: Subcompact car (B)
- Body style: 4-door sedan 5-door hatchback
- Layout: Front engine, front-wheel-drive

Powertrain
- Engine: 1.5 L ET1 I4 (petrol)
- Transmission: 5-speed manual 4-speed automatic

Dimensions
- Wheelbase: 2,525 mm (99 in)
- Length: 4,610 mm (181 in) (sedan); 4,200 mm (165 in) (hatchback)
- Width: 1,660 mm (65 in)
- Height: 1,465 mm (58 in)

The FAW Oley (一汽欧朗) is a subcompact car available as sedan and hatchback bodystyles produced by the FAW Group under the Oley brand.

== Overview ==
The Oley sedan was originally codenamed the A130 during development phase, and was originally developed as a subcompact named the B30 for the Bestune (Besturn at the time) brand. The Oley was built on the PQ32+ platform developed from the Mark 2 Volkswagen Jetta platform built by FAW Volkswagen. The platform was criticized for being cheap and the design was criticized for being too radical for the Bestune brand, which led to FAW launching the Oley brand as a brand for younger generations.

The Oley brand was revealed in November 2011. In March 2012, the first product, the Oley sedan was launched in the Chinese market. The production Oley sedan was previewed by the GO Concept during the 2011 Shanghai Auto Show. Production started on Marth 7, 2012.

The Oley subcompact is powered by a 1.5-litre engine codenamed CA4GA5 producing a maximum output of 102 hp and 135 nm. Transmission is either a 5-speed manual transmission or a 4-speed automatic transmission.

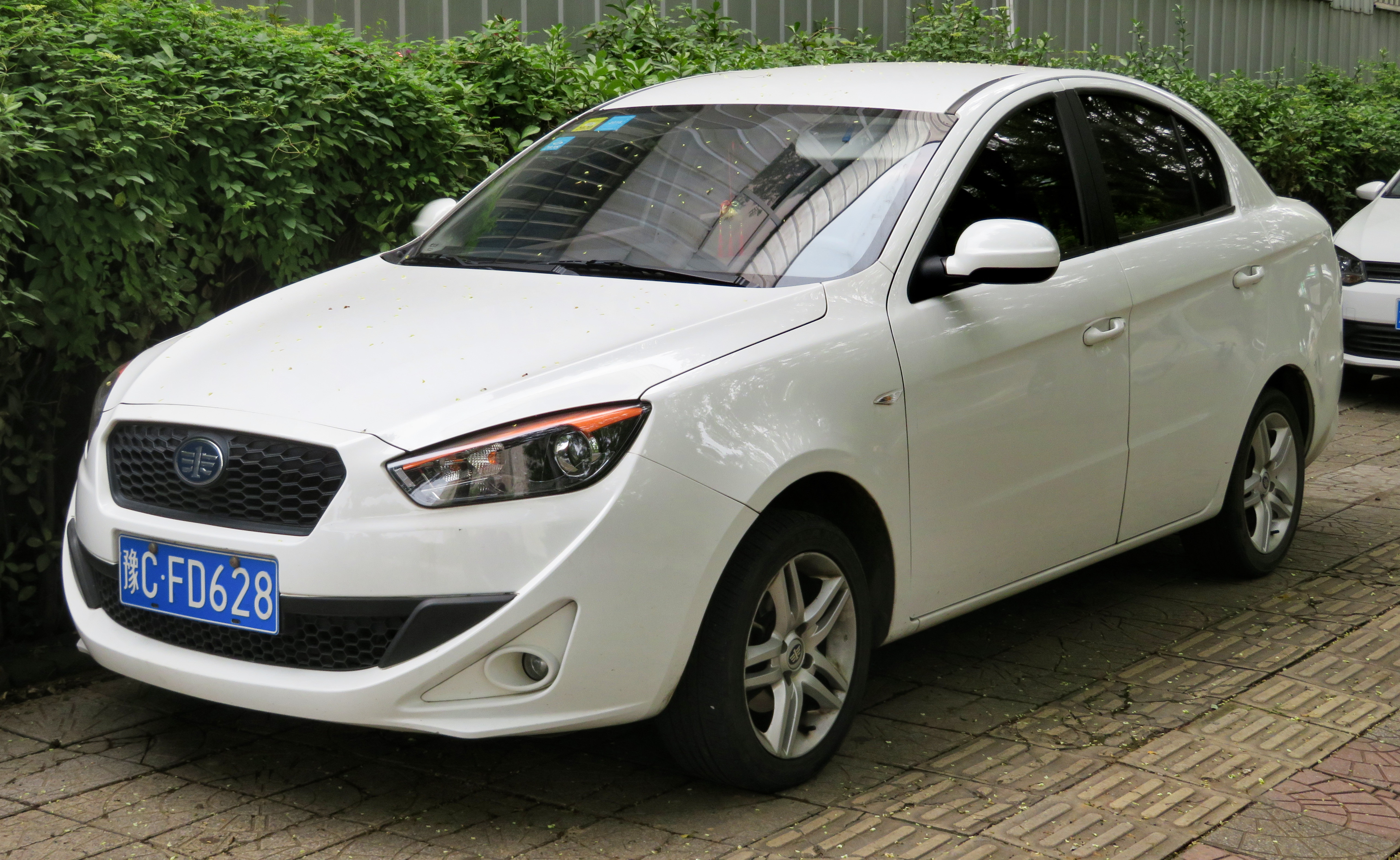
FAW Oley sedan

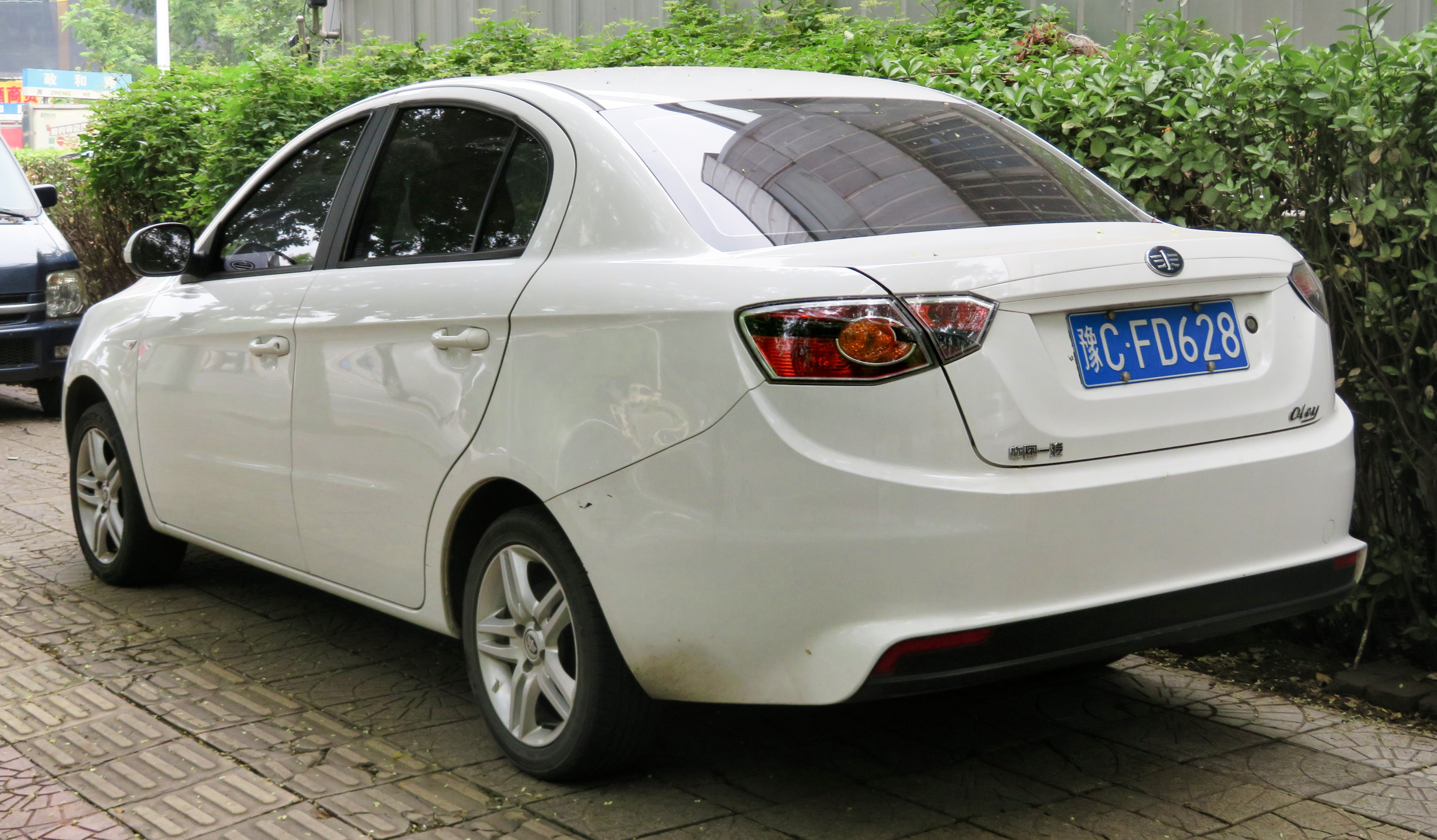
FAW Oley sedan rear

The Oley hatchback was unveiled during the 2013 Shanghai Auto Show, and was launched in the Chinese market in December 2013. The hatchback features the same interior and powertrain as the sedan launched in 2012.

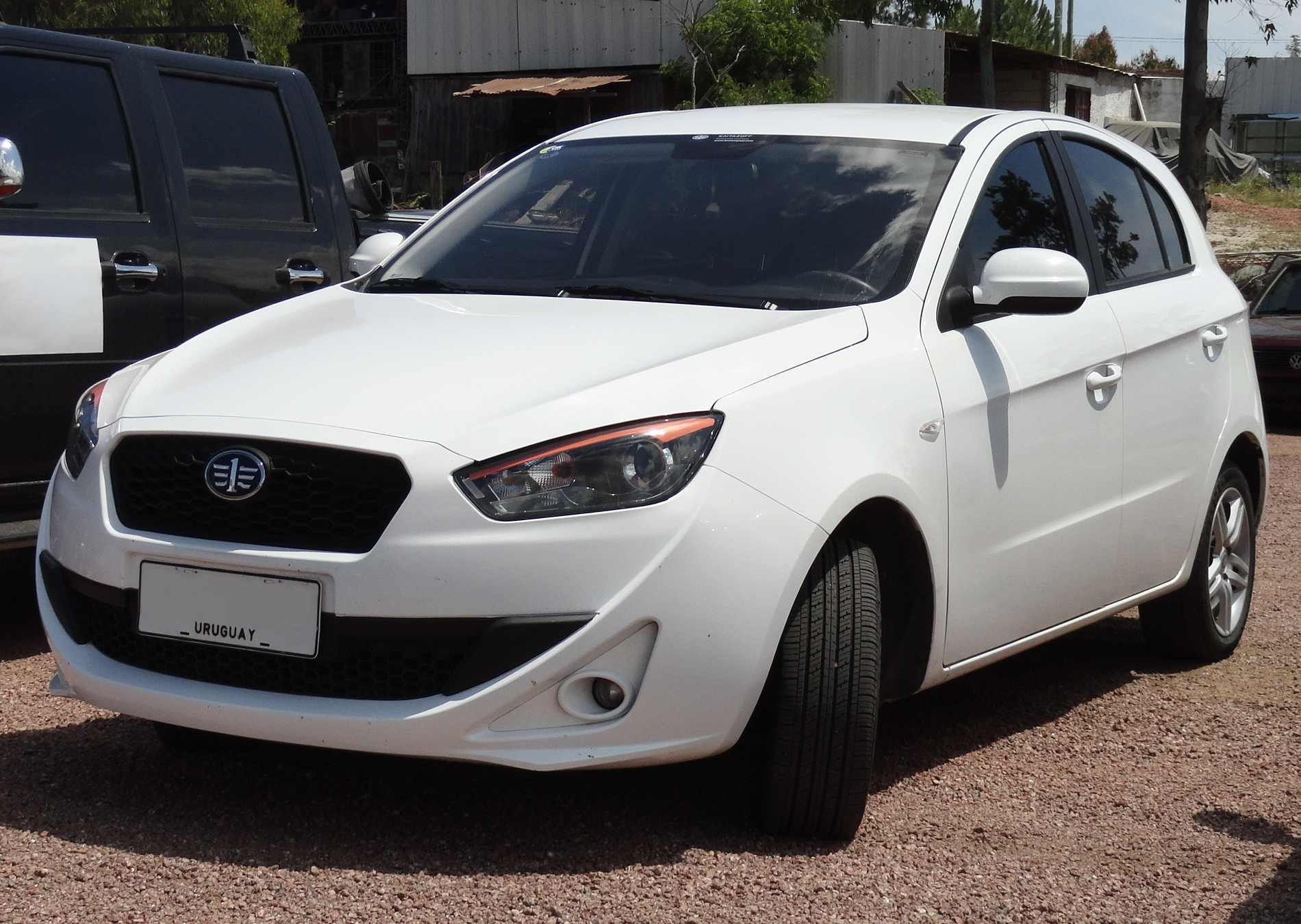
FAW Oley hatchback

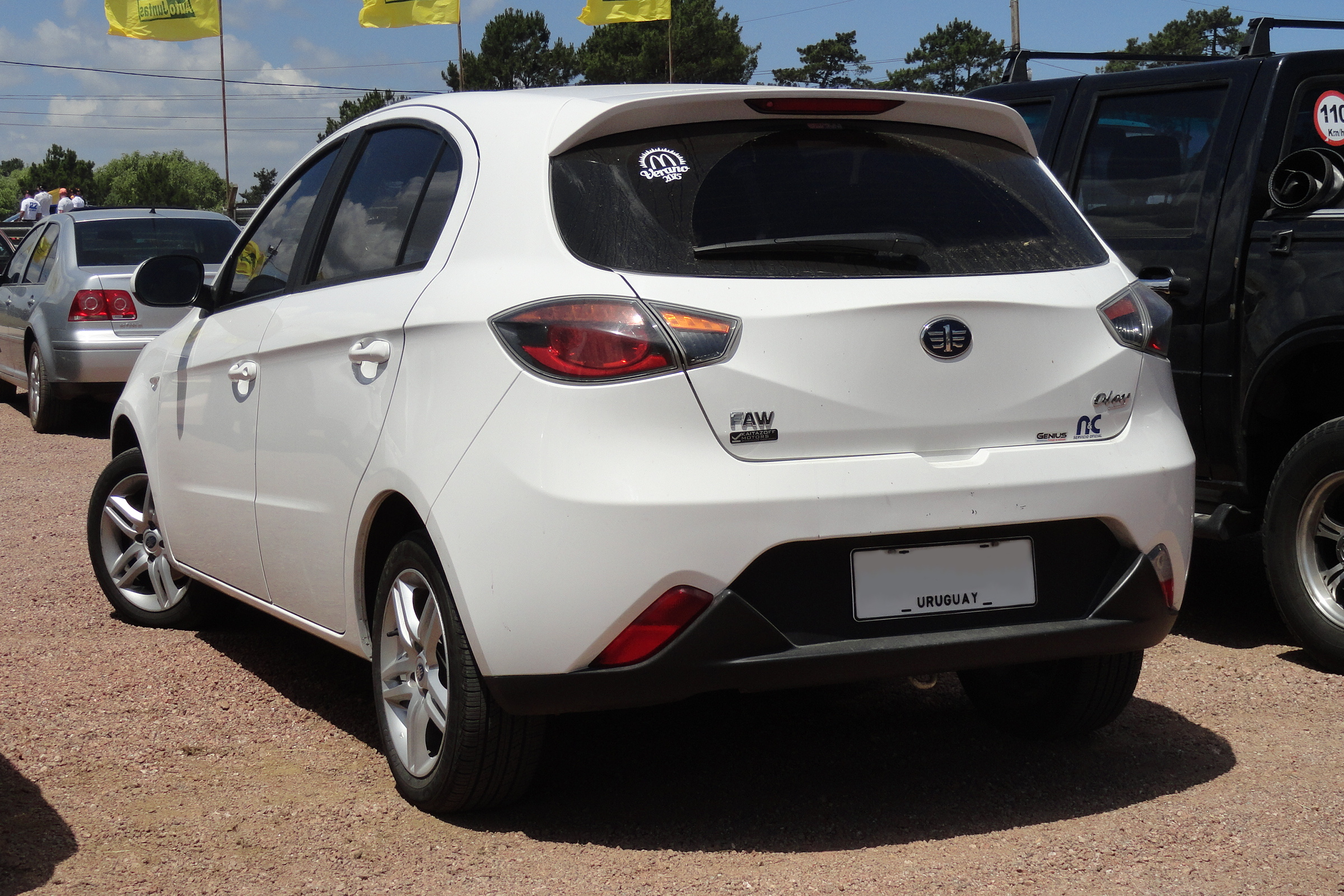
FAW Oley hatchback rear

=== FAW Oley EV ===
The Oley EV is the electric version of the Oley hatchback, and was launched on the Chinese car market in the second quarter of 2015. The Oley EV is powered by an electric motor with an output of 47 hp with electricity coming from a 21.1 kWh lithium-ion battery pack. The range of the Oley EV is 150 kilometer and the top speed is 140 kilometer per hour. FAW claims the acceleration from 0 to 50 kilometers per hour is 6.8 seconds and 4 seconds for acceleration from 50 to 80 kilometers per hour. The curb weight of the Oley EV is 1250 kg. Charging takes 48 minutes for 80% battery on a fast charger.
