= Bestune T33 =

Subcompact crossover SUV

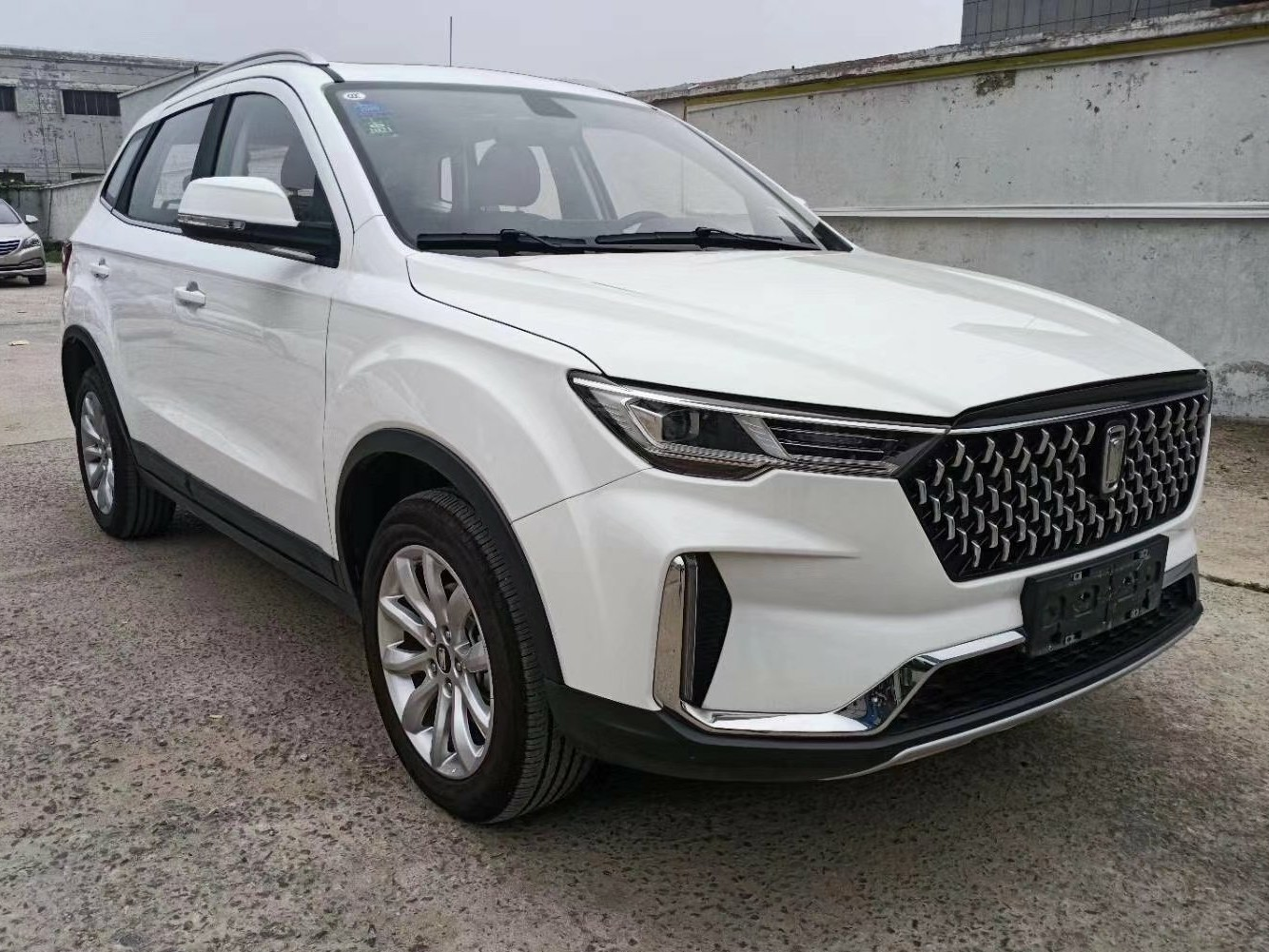

Overview
- Manufacturer: Bestune (FAW Group)
- Also called: Senia R8; Senia Hongyan
- Production: 2019–2022 (China); 2022–present (export)
- Assembly: China: Changchun

Body and chassis
- Class: Subcompact crossover SUV (B)
- Body style: 5-door SUV
- Layout: Front engine, front-wheel drive
- Related: Senia R7; Besturn X40

Powertrain
- Engine: 1.6 liter (16 Valve) inline-4 engine
- Transmission: 5-speed manual 6-speed automatic

Dimensions
- Wheelbase: 2,600 mm (102.4 in)
- Length: 4,330 mm (170.5 in)
- Width: 1,780 mm (70.1 in)
- Height: 1,680 mm (66.1 in)
- Curb weight: 1,315–1,345 kg (2,899–2,965 lb)

Chronology
- Predecessor: Bestune X40

The Bestune T33 is a subcompact crossover SUV produced by the FAW Group under the brand name Bestune.

== Overview ==
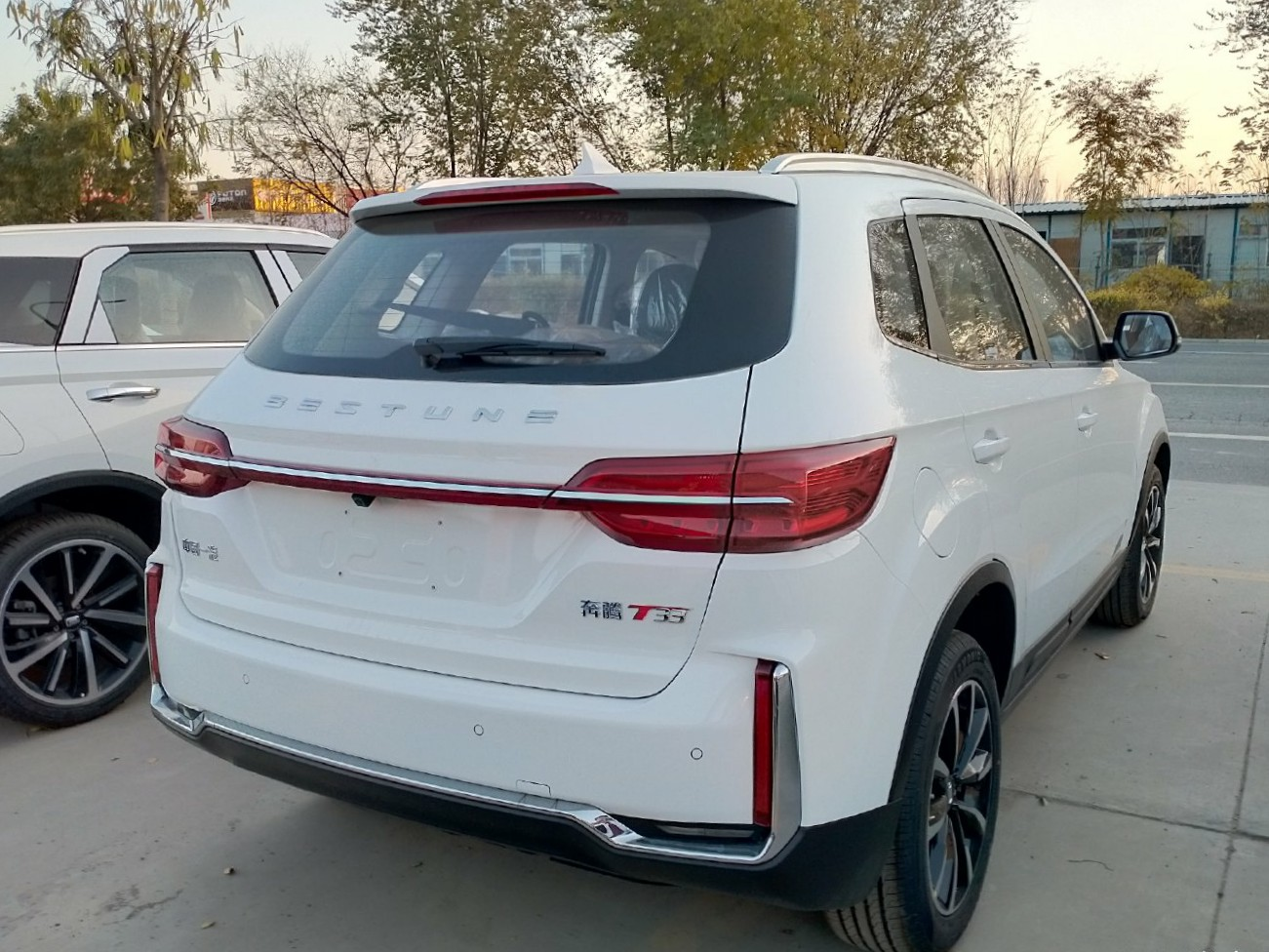
Rear view

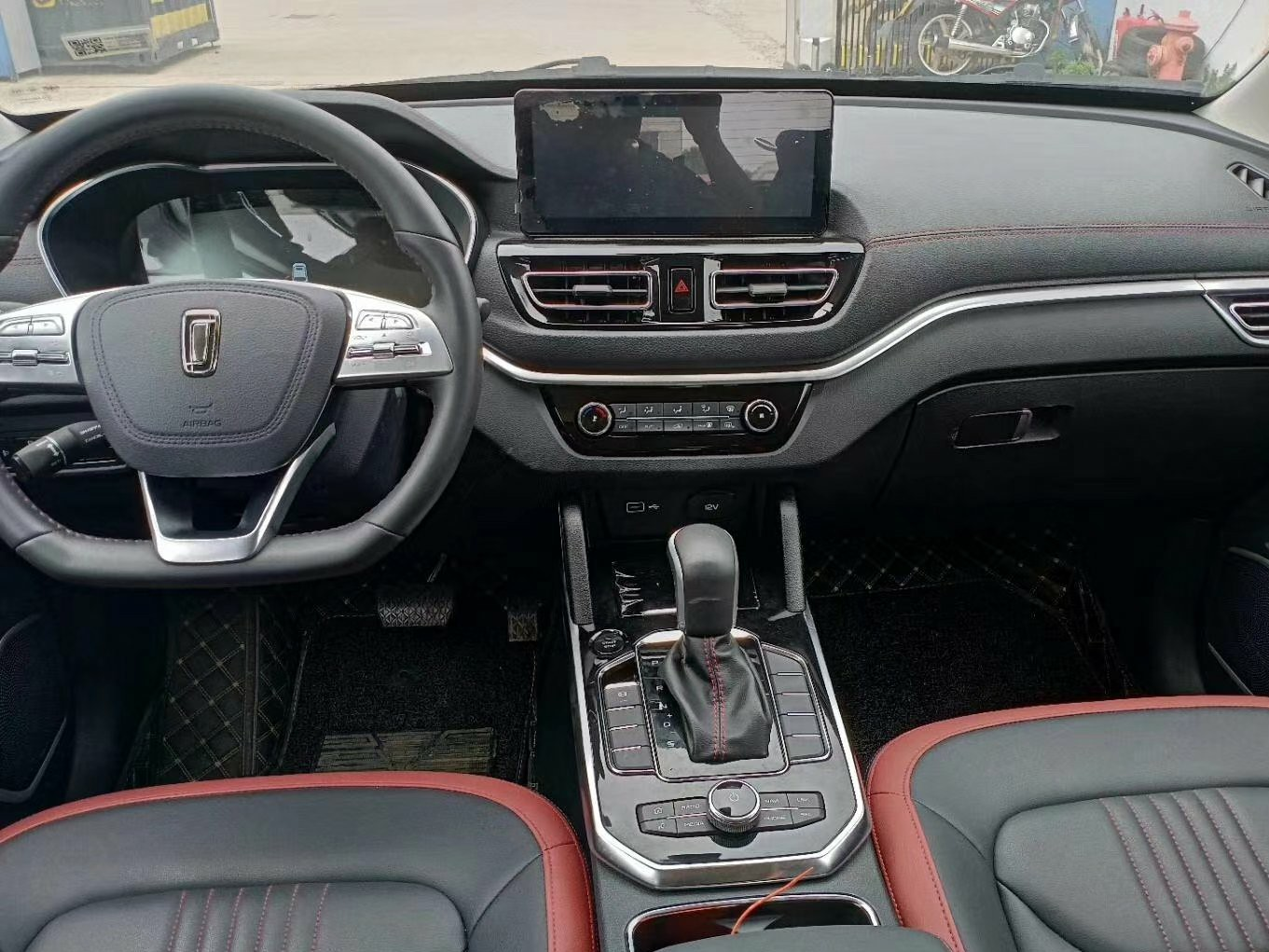
Interior

The Bestune T33 is launched in July 2019, and is originally based on the Bestune X40 shown at the 2016 Guangzhou Auto Show while the whole vehicle received a complete makeover to replace the X40.

== Specifications ==
The front and rear of the Bestune T33 features the design language inline with the compact Bestune T77 launched earlier, and is followed by the mid-size Bestune T99 and compact Bestune T55 crossovers. The T33 also features 18-inch tires. The interior of the T33 is equipped with a full LCD 3D naked eye dashboard and a 10.25-inch central control LCD screen with FAW's D-Life 4.0 intelligent network connection infotainment system and a virtual assistant called YOMI which could be customized.

== Powertrain ==
At the market launch, the car was powered exclusively by a 1.6-liter gasoline engine with intake manifold injection and a maximum output of 84 kW (114 hp) shared with the previous X40. The engine is optionally available with a 5-speed manual transmission or a 6-speed automatic transmission. At the end of 2020, this engine was replaced by a supercharged 1.2-liter gasoline engine with 105 kW (143 hp).
