= Bestune T90 =

Mid-size crossover SUV

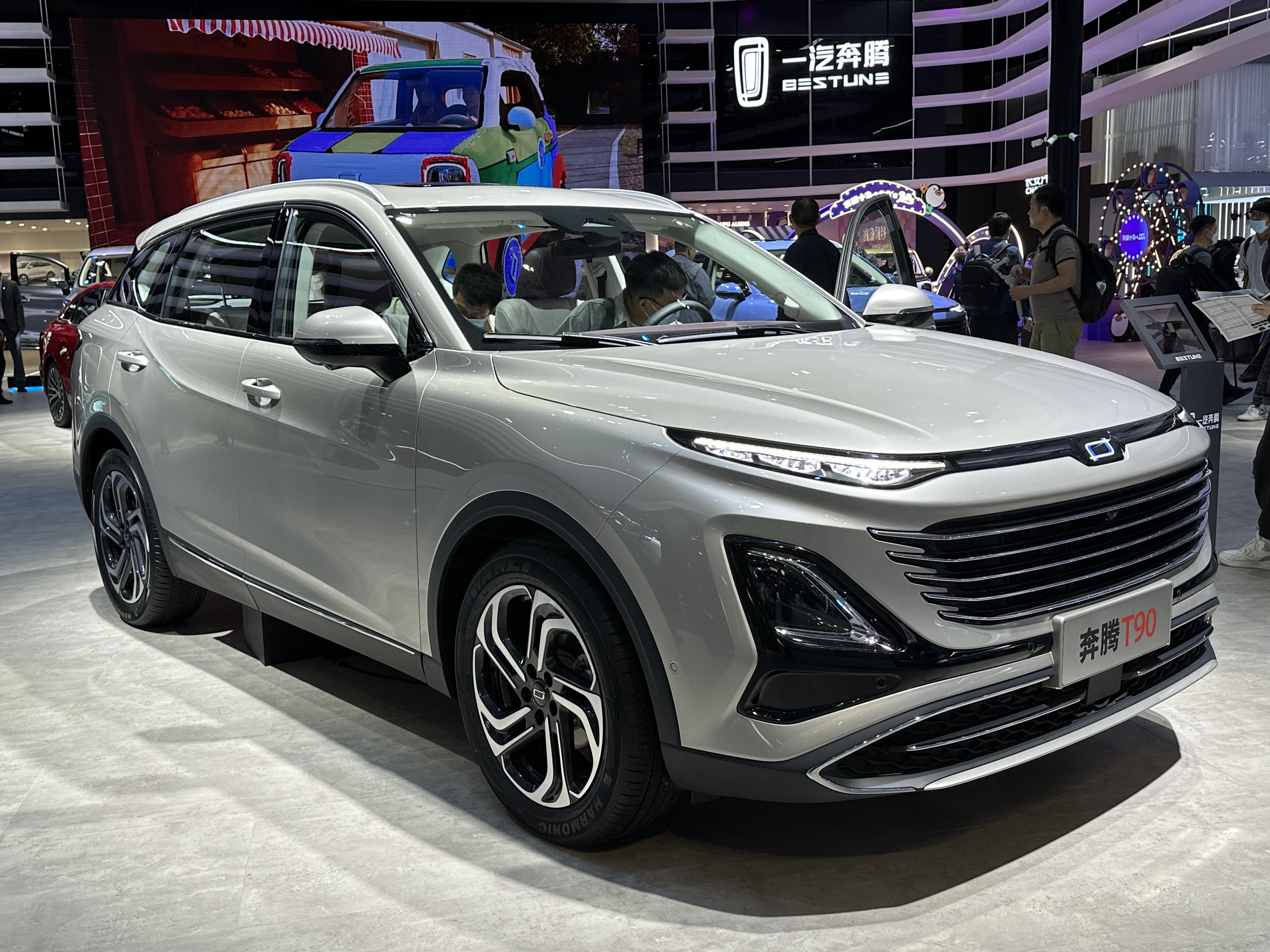
- The Bestune T90 at 2023 Auto Shanghai.

Overview
- Manufacturer: Bestune (FAW Group)
- Also called: Bestune Yueyi 07 (plug-in hybrid, 2025–present)
- Production: 2023–2026 (China); 2024–present (export); 2025–present (Yueyi 07)
- Assembly: China: Changchun

Body and chassis
- Class: Mid-size crossover SUV (D)
- Body style: 5-door SUV
- Layout: Front engine, front-wheel drive

Powertrain
- Engine: Petrol: 1.5 L turbo I4; 2.0 L turbo I4
- Transmission: 8-speed automatic

Dimensions
- Wheelbase: 2,772 mm (109.1 in)
- Length: 4,718 mm (185.7 in); 4,745 mm (186.8 in) (Yueyi 07)
- Width: 1,880 mm (74.0 in)
- Height: 1,710 mm (67.3 in)
- Curb weight: 1,525–1,575 kg (3,362–3,472 lb)

The Bestune T90 is a mid-size crossover SUV produced by the FAW Group under the brand name Bestune. In production since 2023, it is positioned between the T77 and T99.

== Overview ==
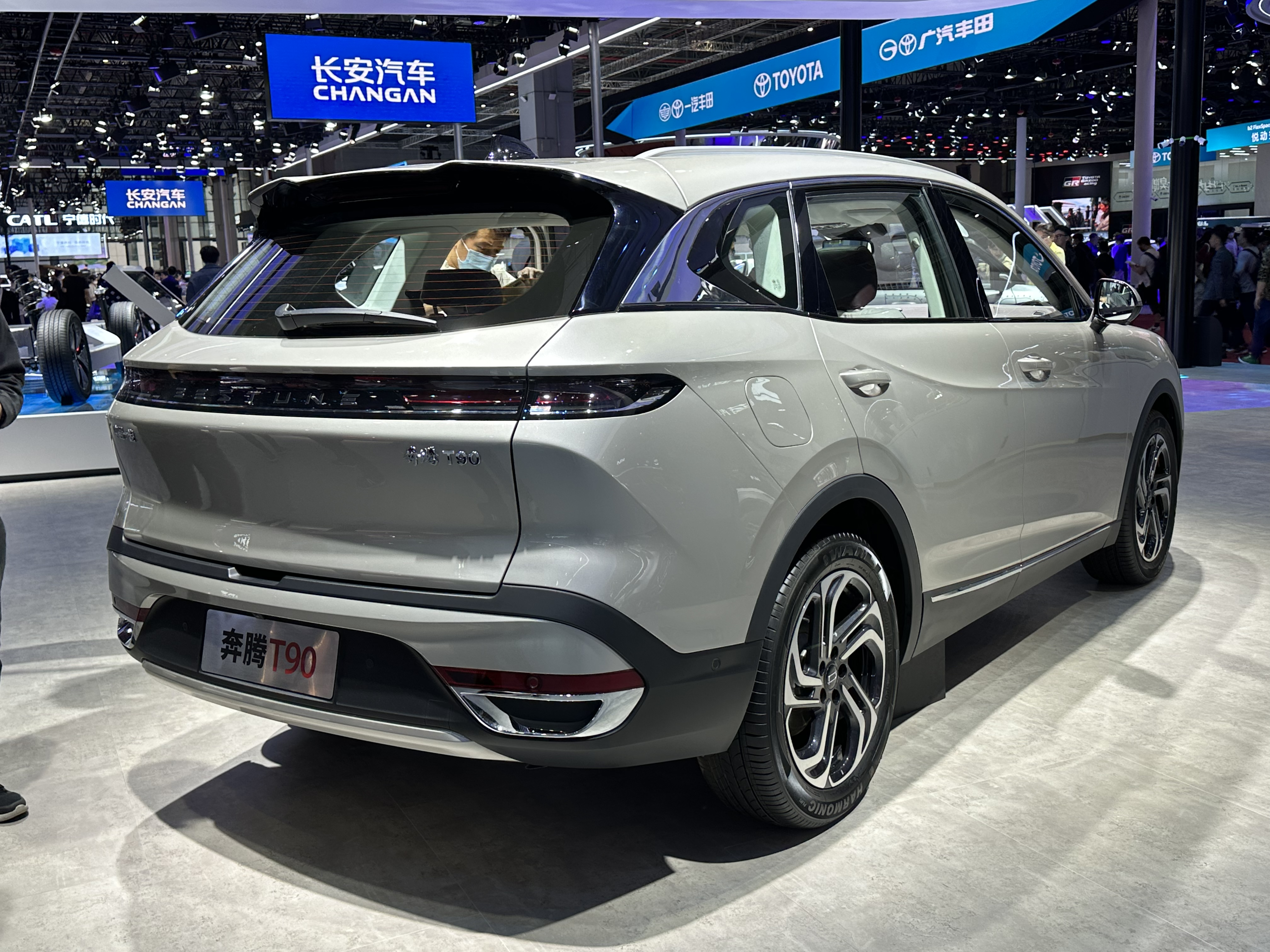
Rear view

The 4.72 meter long vehicle was presented at Auto Shanghai in April 2023. The market launch on the Chinese market took place in June 2023.

== Specifications ==
The T90 is powered by either a 1.5-liter gasoline engine with 124 kW (169 hp) or a 2.0-liter gasoline engine with 185 kW (252 hp). Both engines have a turbocharger and front-wheel drive. MacPherson struts are installed on the front axle and multi-link suspension on the rear axle.

The passenger cabin has an aesthetic combining panels made of piano plastic, leather and chrome. In front of the driver there are digital indicators with a diagonal of eight inches and an additional HUD system in front of the driver's eyes, while the central console is dominated by a vertical touch screen of the multimedia system with a diagonal of 12.6 inches.

== Bestune Yueyi 07 ==
In February 2025, a hybrid variant debuted as part of the second model from the electrified Yueyi line was called as the Bestune Yueyi 07 (Chinese: 一汽悦意07). Visually, it was distinguished by redesigned bumpers, led by a different front fascia with a distinctive light strip and a small, low-mounted air intake. The combustion-electric drivetrain consisted of a 1.5-liter gasoline engine, which, together with an electric motor, developed a combined power of 225 hp. A 31 kWh battery, rechargeable from a wall socket, enabled an all-electric range of up to 150 kilometers.

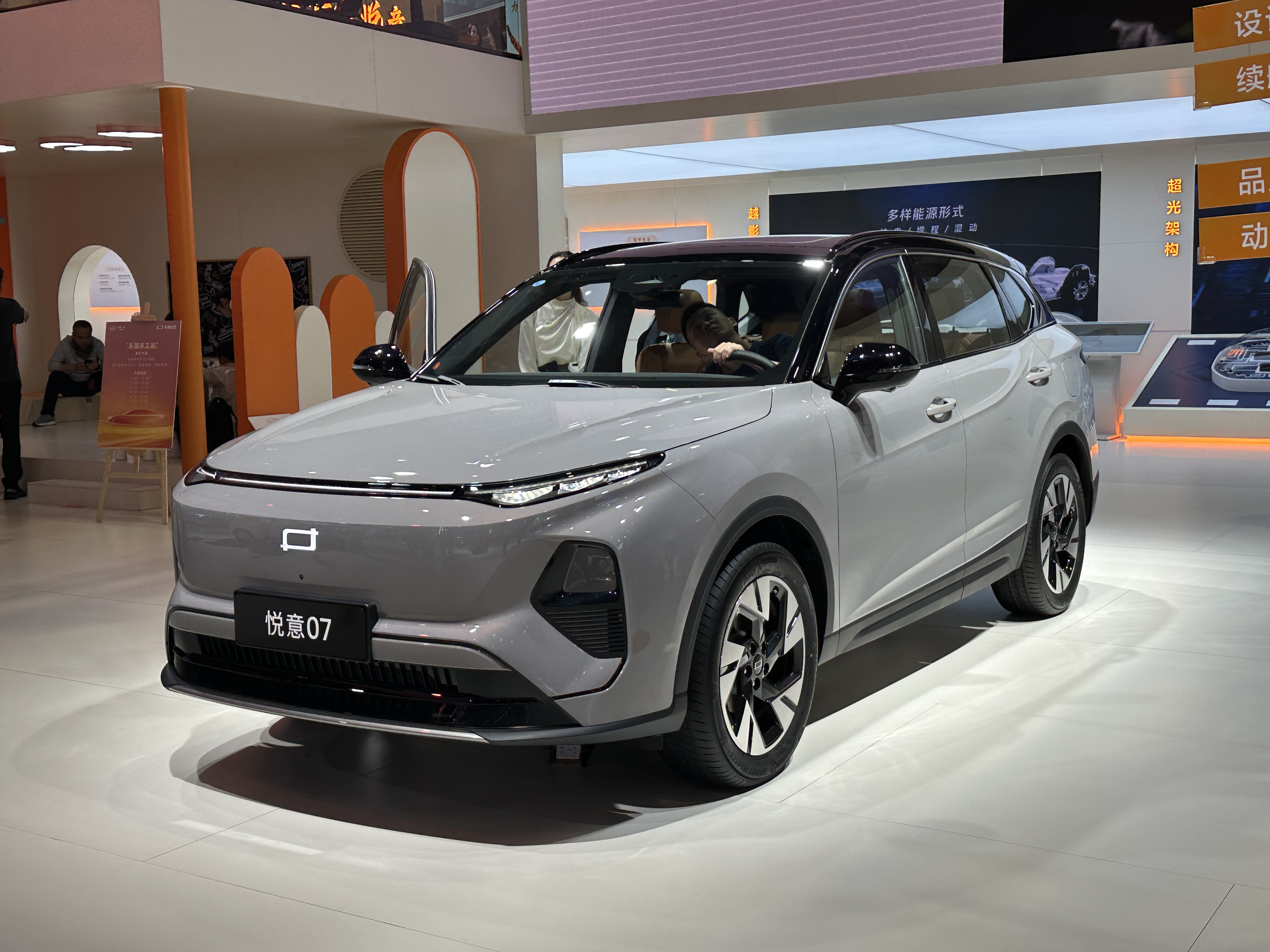
Bestune Yueyi 07

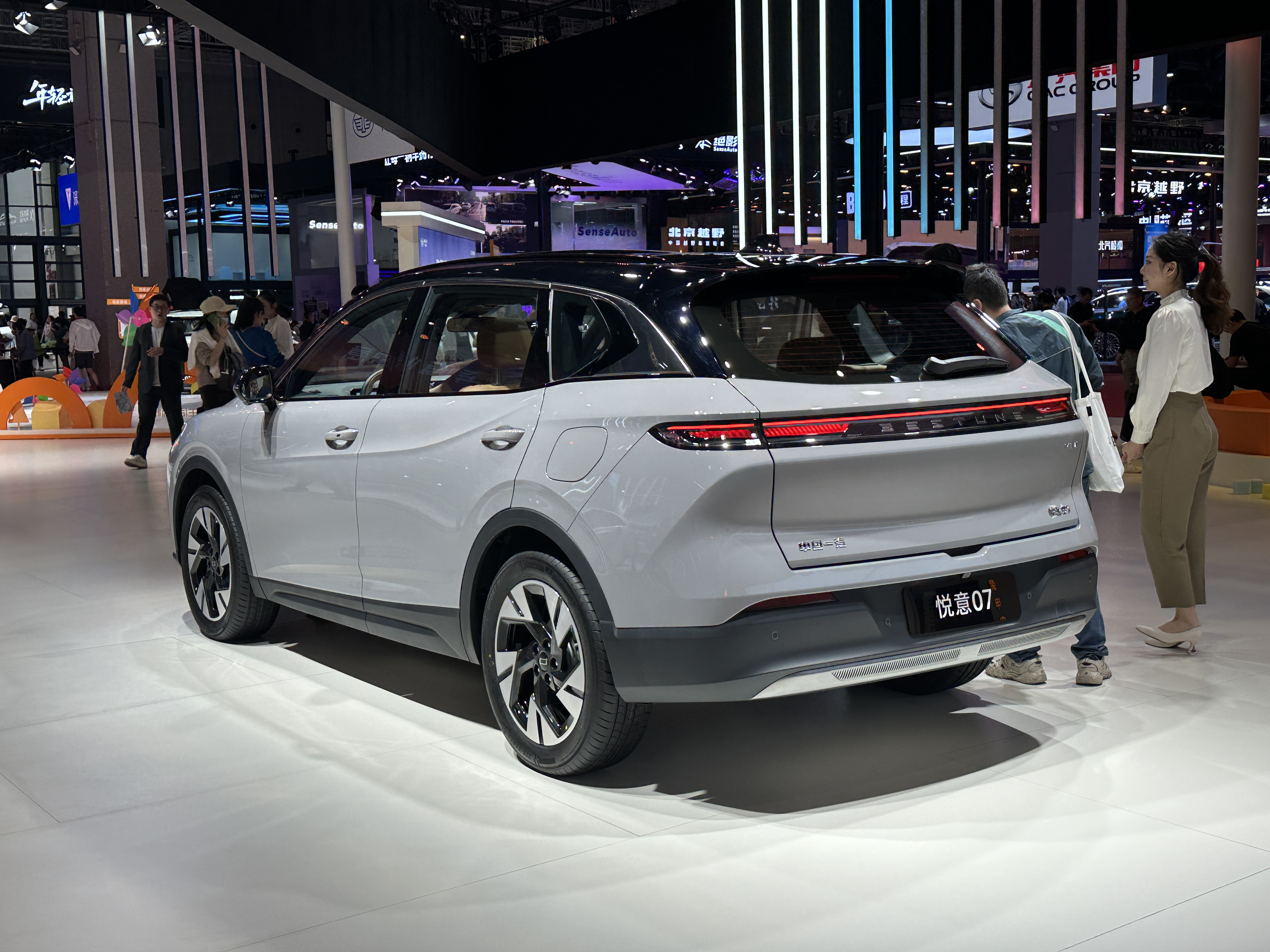
Rear view

== Sales ==
Year	China	
Year	T90	Yueyi 07
2023	5,318	—
2024	7,669	—
2025	2,860	3,080
