= T99 (disambiguation) =

T99 is a Belgian music group.

T99 may also refer to:

- T99 (camouflage), a camouflage pattern
- Bestune T99, a Chinese crossover
- Jimmy Nelson (singer) (1919–2007), American blues singer
- Type 99 tank, a Chinese tank
- Universal Combat Platform T-99, a Russian prototype tank
- Tetris 99, a video game
