= M84 =

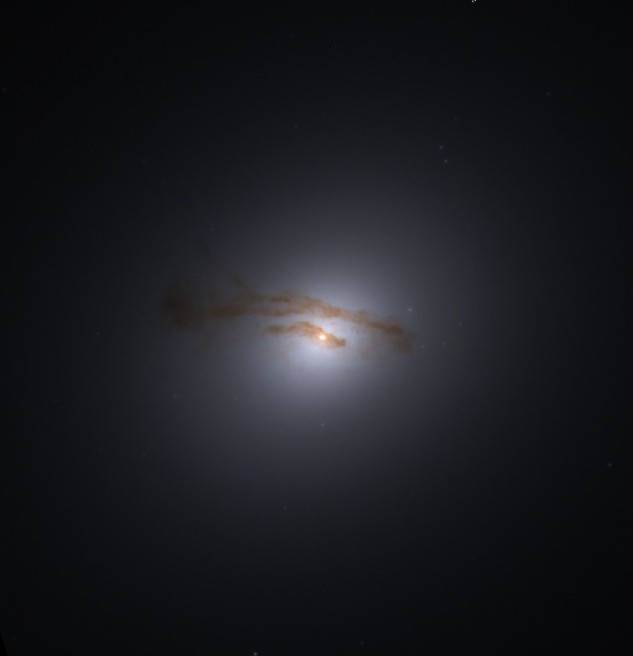
Messier 84 nucleus by Hubble Space Telescope

M84 or M-84 may refer to:

- M-84, a Yugoslav main battle tank
- M-84 (Michigan highway), a north–south state trunkline highway in the Lower Peninsula
- M-84, a route of the United States Marine Highway Program
- M84 camouflage pattern, the former camouflage pattern of the Danish military
- M84 mortar carrier, a derivative of the American M59 armored personnel carrier
- M84 stun grenade, a flashbang used by the United States
- Messier 84, a giant elliptical or lenticular galaxy in the constellation Virgo
- Nora M-84, a Yugoslav and Serbian 152 mm and 155 mm gun-howitzer
- Zastava M84, a general-purpose machine gun
