= Modèle 1951 helmet =

French military helmet

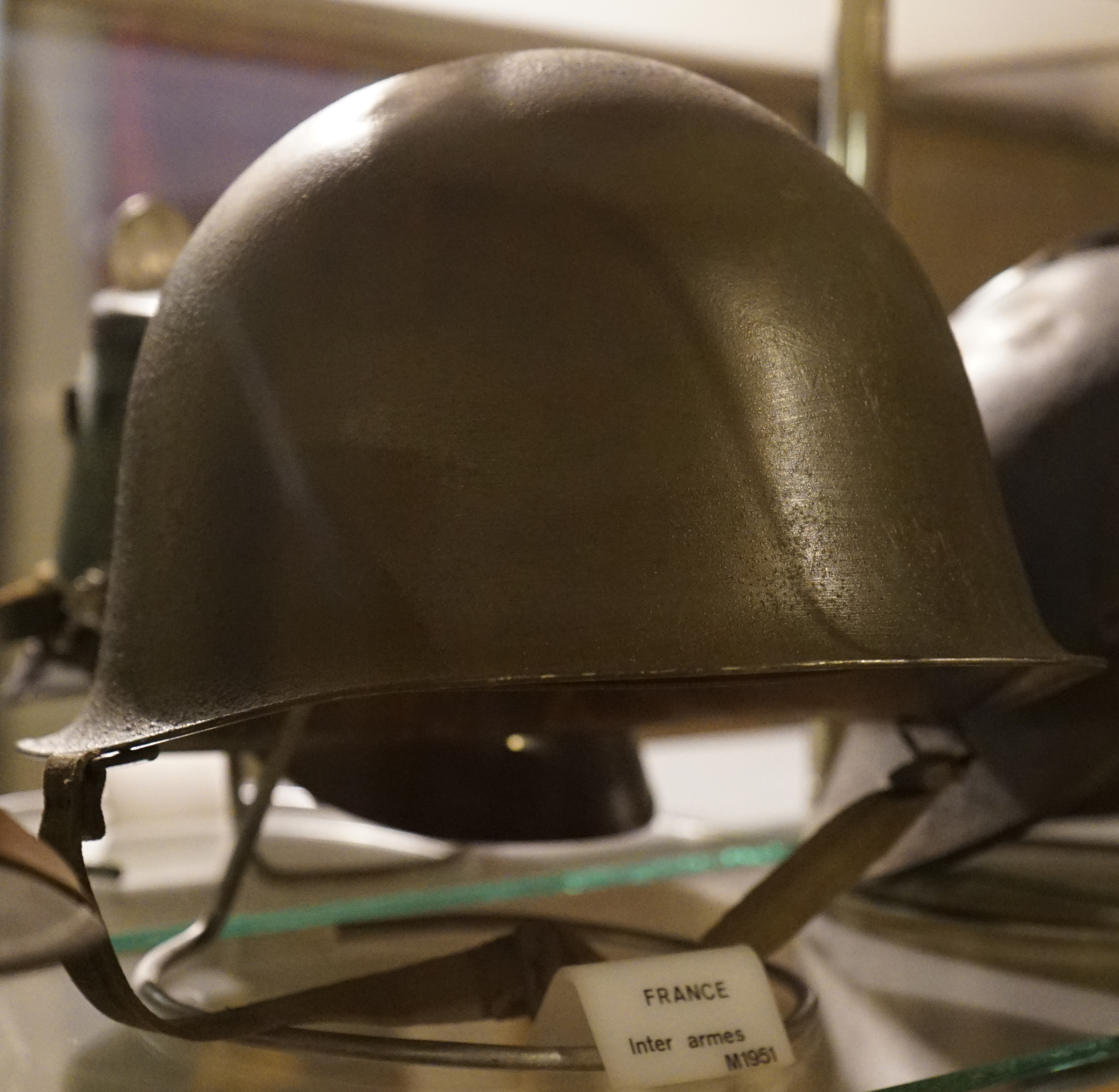
- Modèle 1951 helmet of the French Army.
- Type: Combat helmet
- Place of origin: France

Service history
- In service: 1952–1990 (France)
- Used by: See Users
- Wars: First Indochina War; Korean War; Vietnam War; Laotian Civil War; Cambodian Civil War; Algerian War; Cameroon War; Bizerte crisis Suez Crisis; 1958 Lebanon crisis Portuguese Colonial War; Angolan Civil War; Rhodesian Bush War; South African Border War; Chadian Civil War (1965–1979); Chadian–Libyan War; Toyota War; Tuareg rebellion (1990–1995); Sand War; Ifni War; Western Sahara War; Western Sahara conflict Mauritania–Senegal Border War; Djiboutian Civil War; 1967 Six-Day War; 1967-1970 War of Attrition; Palestinian insurgency in South Lebanon; 1973 Yom Kippur War; Lebanese Civil War; 1978 South Lebanon conflict 1982 Lebanon War; South Lebanon conflict (1985–2000); 2006 Lebanon War; Republic of the Congo Civil War (1993–1994); Republic of the Congo Civil War (1997–1999); First Ivorian Civil War; Second Ivorian Civil War; Mali War; Islamist insurgency in the Sahel; Central African Bush War; Central African Republic Civil War

Production history
- Designer: French Army Quartermaster Corps
- Designed: 1951
- Manufacturer: French Army Quartermaster Corps; HR; A.G. Paris; E.P.C. Paris; SAUF Paris; Richard Haas & Cie; J.Dunois & Fils Vincennes; Cie Labbé Fr. St-Florent du Cher; Établissements Luchaire; Franck Aubervilliers; Carpentier Cusset; Ducellier Issoire; Japy Voujaucourt; L.U. Messei; M.AM.OU Marseille; Menesa Neunkirchen; Thilbault Montreuil
- Produced: 1951–1976

The Modèle 1951 helmet was a military helmet used by the French military (Army, Navy, Air Force and Gendarmerie), iconic of the Algerian War. It replaced a variety of helmets used during the Second World War, including the Adrian helmet, Modèle 1945 helmet and American-supplied M1 Helmet.

== Development ==
The Modèle 1951 was designed to have the same general shape as the US M1 Helmet, in an effort towards standardisation within NATO. The two differ in that the M1 has a longer visor and a more pronounced downwards slope on the sides. The M1 also has a nape strap while the Modèle 1951 does not.

== Description ==
The Modèle 1951 comprised a heavy external cover, made of 1.2 mm of an amagnetic alloy of manganese steel, and a lighter inner helmet.

The Modèle 1951 was produced until 1976, before being superseded by the Modèle 1978 helmet. It nonetheless remained in service well into the 1980s.

== Users ==
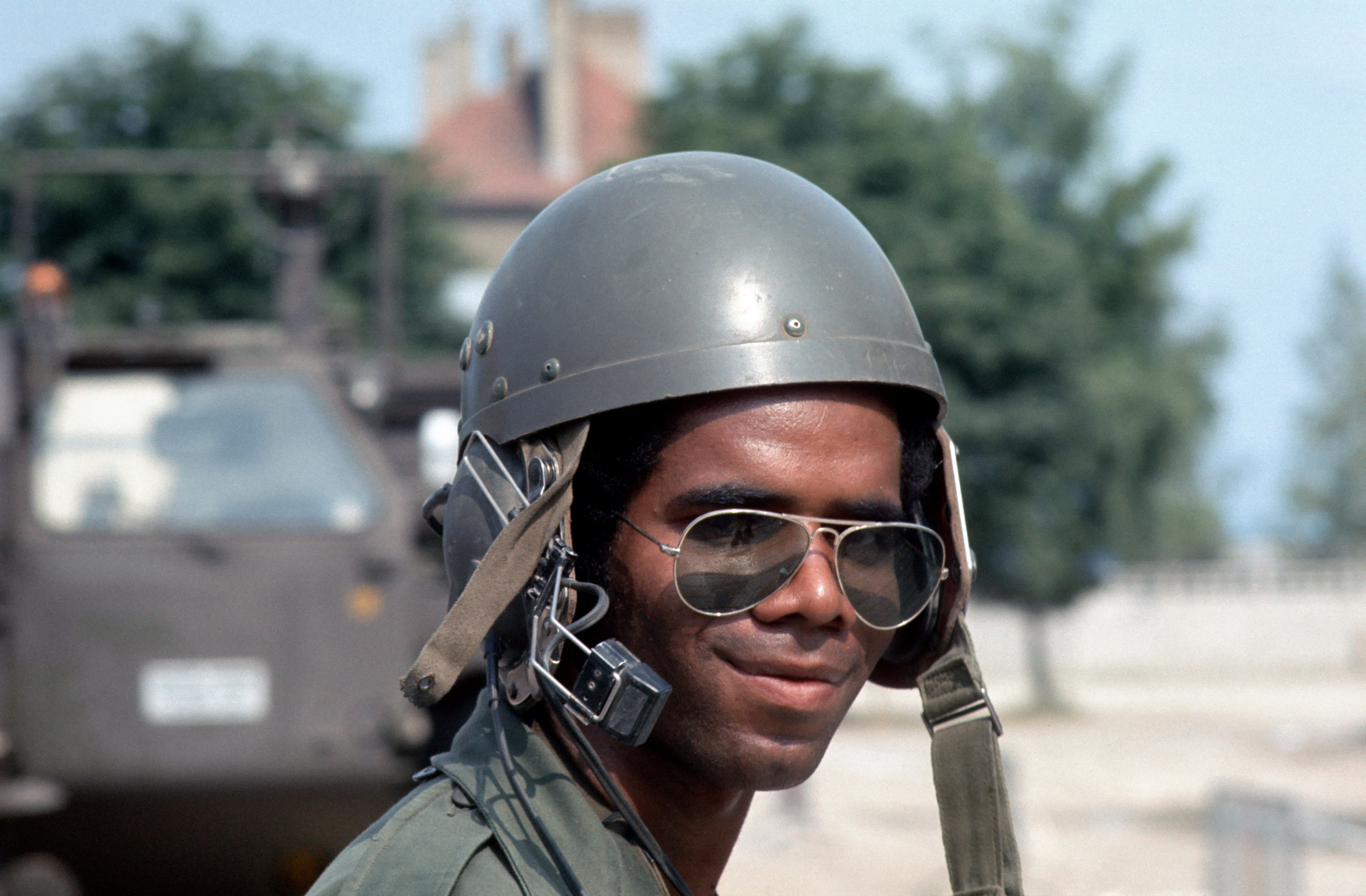
A French soldier with a Mle 1951 liner for armored troops (aka Modele 1965), 1976.

- Algeria
- Benin
- Burkina Faso – Burkina Faso Armed Forces
- Cambodia – Khmer National Armed Forces
- Cameroon – Cameroon Armed Forces
- Central African Republic
- Chad
- Comoros
- Djibouti
- France – French Armed Forces, Gendarmerie Nationale
- Gabon
- Guinea
- Kingdom of Laos – Royal Lao Armed Forces
- India – Indian Armed Forces, Indian Police Service
- Israel – Israel Defense Forces
- Ivory Coast – Armed Forces of the Republic of Ivory Coast, National Gendarmerie
- Kenya – Kenya Defence Forces, Kenya Police
- Lebanon – Lebanese Armed Forces, Internal Security Forces
- Madagascar
- Mali
- Mauritania
- Morocco – Royal Moroccan Armed Forces, Royal Moroccan Gendarmerie
- Niger
- Pakistan – Pakistan Armed Forces and paramilitaries
- Portugal – Portuguese Army, Portuguese Republican National Guard
- Republic of the Congo
- Rhodesia – Rhodesian Army, British South Africa Police
- Senegal – Armed Forces of Senegal, National Gendarmerie
- South Vietnam – Vietnamese National Army, Republic of Vietnam Military Forces
- South Africa – South African Defence Force, South African Police, South West Africa Territorial Force, South West African Police
- Tunisia – Tunisian Armed Forces, Tunisian National Guard
- Togo

=== Non-state users ===
- Al-Mourabitoun – Seized from Lebanese Armed Forces stocks.
- Al-Tanzim – Seized from Lebanese Armed Forces stocks or provided by Israel.
- Amal Movement – Seized from Lebanese Armed Forces stocks.
- Army of Free Lebanon – Seized from Lebanese Armed Forces stocks.
- Guardians of the Cedars (GoC) – Seized from Lebanese Armed Forces stocks or provided by Israel.
- Hezbollah – Seized from Lebanese Armed Forces stocks.
- Kataeb Regulatory Forces – Seized from Lebanese Armed Forces stocks or provided by Israel.
- Lebanese Arab Army – Seized from Lebanese Armed Forces stocks.
- Lebanese Forces – Seized from Lebanese Armed Forces stocks or provided by Israel.
- Lebanese Youth Movement (MKG) – Seized from Lebanese Armed Forces stocks.
- People's Liberation Army (Lebanon) – Seized from Lebanese Armed Forces stocks.
- South Lebanon Army – Seized from Lebanese Armed Forces stocks or provided by Israel.
- Tigers Militia – Seized from Lebanese Armed Forces stocks or provided by Israel.
- Tyous Team of Commandos (TTC) – Seized from Lebanese Armed Forces stocks or provided by Israel.
- UNITA/FALA – Seized from Portuguese Army stocks or provided by South Africa.
- Palestine Liberation Organization – Seized from Lebanese Armed Forces stocks.
- Polisario Front/Sahrawi People's Liberation Army – Captured from the Royal Moroccan Army or provided by Algeria.
- Zgharta Liberation Army (a.k.a. Marada Brigade) – Seized from Lebanese Armed Forces stocks.

== See also ==
- Modèle 1978 helmet
- SPECTRA helmet
