= SPECTRA helmet =

French military helmet

SPECTRA F2 helmet
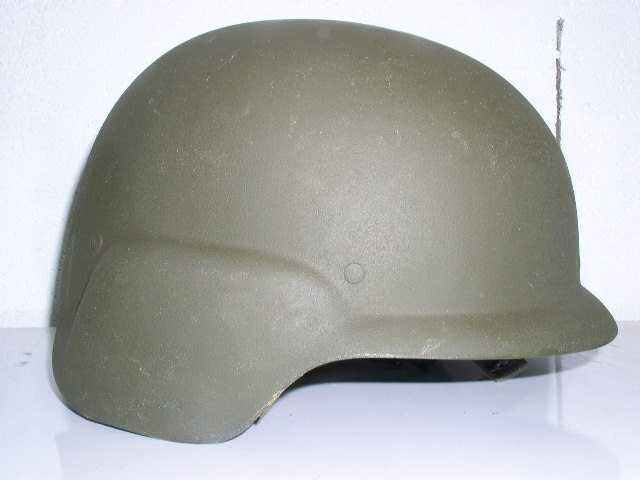
- Spectra helmet in OD color
- Type: Combat helmet
- Place of origin: France

Service history
- In service: 1992–present
- Used by: See Users
- Wars: Bosnian War; Kosovo War; War in Afghanistan (2001-2021); Mali War

Production history
- Designer: CGF Gallet (Currently MSA Gallet)
- Manufacturer: CGF Gallet (Currently MSA Gallet)
- Variants: See Variants

The SPECTRA helmet or CGF Gallet Combat Helmet is the PASGT-style ballistic helmet in use with the French military, and the armies of several other countries. Built by CGF Gallet (producer of the F1 helmet for firemen), it weighs 1.4 kg (3.1 lb), is available in three sizes, and is made from ultra-high-molecular-weight polyethylene Spectra fibers, produced under license from Honeywell.

The SPECTRA helmet can stop shell fragments of 1.1 g (0.039 oz) travelling at 680 m/s (2,200 ft/s), an 80% improvement over the Modèle 1978 helmet it replaced.

== History ==
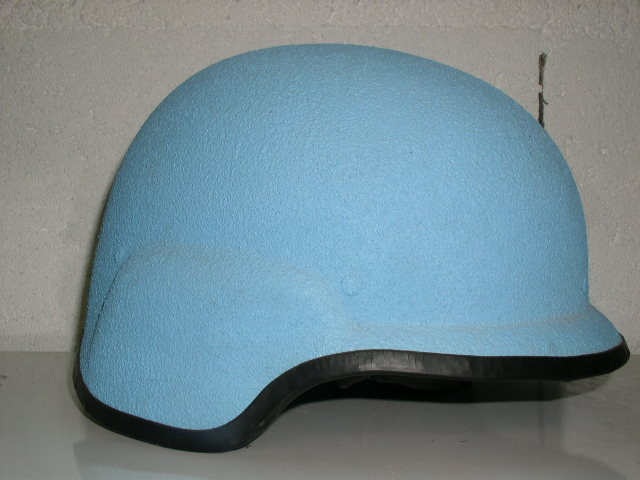
The first models were made for United Nations peacekeeping operations, and were blue in the mass.

The SPECTRA helmet is the result of studies conducted in the 1990s, intended to design the helmet for the French Army of the 2000s. In 1992, the conflict in the former Yugoslavia placed large numbers of French troops in contact with well-trained and well-equipped forces, especially snipers during the Siege of Sarajevo, where heavier protection than the Modèle 1978 helmet proved necessary.

The Army requested an emergency study for the new helmet, and tests were made, which selected the Dyneema fiber. Gallet drafted a model based on the Personnel Armor System for Ground Troops (PASGT or Fritz) helmet used by the United States Army, and produced a first series of 5,000 which was immediately made available to the blue helmets in the former Yugoslavia. These first models were mostly blue in color. Later models used the NATO green color.

They gradually equipped all French troops, with priority given to units on missions in foreign territories. This completely replaced all the 1978 helmets in French service.

At one point, it was tested by the Uruguayan military, but it was not adopted.

== Description ==
The helmet is made of Spectra fibre. It is not bulletproof against rifle or carbine bullets. It is a fragmentation-resistant helmet with a maximum distortion (loss of shape) of 20 mm (0.79 in) from a 9mm full metal jacket bullet (FMJ) of 8 g (124 gr) travelling 430 m/s (1,400 ft/s) on impact. It has a resistance to fragments that meets NATO Standardised Regulation (STANAG) 2920, V50 mini, which is 680 m/s (2,200 ft/s). Resistance to shock-impact meets protection standard EN397 for industrial helmets.

The helmet can be worn with earmuffs and an individual radio system. Further equipment, like night vision, can be added. The new infantry combat equipment of the French army, the Félin system, is partly based on development of the SPECTRA helmet.

== Variants ==
=== M/96 ===
In the early 1990s, the Danish army began looking for a replacement to the old US M1 helmet designated M/48 Steel helmet, which had been the standard helmet in Denmark since World War 2. The M/96 helmet was officially brought into service in 1996 as the M/96.

==== Helmet covers ====
The removable helmet cover allows to change the pattern of the camouflage. For instance, the Danish army uses three different covers:

- Helmet cover "Dk-version". An early version produced probably locally in Denmark. Almost identical to the CGF Gallet 900076 version but with no rubber rim, instead it has a drawstring to keep it tight to the helmet. The loops of the drawstrings on top of the helmet sometimes are quite big. M/84 camouflage pattern. Still in use in some places until roughly 1998 or 1999.
- M/96 Helmet cover. CGF Gallet 900076-VSxx (x = XL, L, M). This is the standard cover in the Danish army. M/84 camouflage pattern and a big rubber rim to hold it tight to the helmet. Made of the same fabric as the M/84 Combat uniform: 67% cotton & 33% polyester.
- M/03 Helmet cover. MSA Gallet 501814-JJxx (x = XL, L, M). With M/99 Desert camouflage pattern and a big rubber rim to hold it tight to the helmet. Made of the same fabric as the M/03 Desert uniform: 90% cotton & 10% polyester.

== Users ==
- Austria: Service helmet of Bundesheer.
- Bangladesh: Standard service helmet.
- Canada: Used helmet design for creation of CG634.
- Denmark: Designated M/96 in Danish service
- Djibouti
- France: The F2 helmet was adopted by the French Army.
- Morocco: Standard helmet of Military of Morocco.
