= Lada Saint Petersburg =

Lada Saint Petersburg LLC
- Native name: ООО Лада Санкт-Петербург
- Formerly: Nissan Manufacturing Rus LLC
- Company type: Subsidiary
- Industry: Automotive
- Founded: 20 June 2006
- Headquarters: Saint Petersburg, Russia
- Products: Cars
- Revenue: ▼ ₽36,707.07 million (2022)
- Operating income: ▼ ₽-6,771.19 million (2022)
- Net income: ▼ ₽-6,015.65 million (2022)
- Total assets: ▼ ₽31,667.64 million (2022)
- Total equity: ▲ ₽23,265.29 million (2022)
- Owners: AvtoVAZ (99%); NAMI (1%)
- Parent: AvtoVAZ

Lada Saint Petersburg is a Russian car manufacturing company owned by AvtoVAZ and headquartered in Saint Petersburg. The company was established in 2006 as a Nissan subsidiary focused on crossover assembly with the name Nissan Manufacturing Rus and started production in 2009. In 2022, it was acquired by NAMI which sold it to AvtoVAZ. The company adopted its present name in June 2023.

== History ==
In 2006, Nissan began building an assembly facility with capacity to produce up to 50,000 vehicles per year at the village of Pargolovo in Saint Petersburg, incorporating it as Nissan Manufacturing Rus LLC (Russian: ООО "Ниcсан Мэнуфэкчуринг Рус") in June 2006. The facility became operational in June 2009 and it produced various crossovers as the X-Trail, Murano and Qashqai. By 2014, it was expanded to produce up to 100,000 vehicles per year.

In March 2022, following a lack of components as a result of sanctions derived from the Russian invasion of Ukraine, Nissan Manufacturing Rus halted operations. In November 2022, the state enterprise NAMI acquired Nissan Manufacturing Rus (including its assembly plant, a research and development facility, and the Moscow marketing and sales offices) for a "symbolic price" with a six-year buyback option for Nissan. In February 2023, NAMI sold 99% of the company in turn to its AvtoVAZ subsidiary for €1. AvtoVAZ announced plans to use the Nissan Manufacturing Rus plant to assemble C and D-segment vehicle kits from other manufacturers, under the Lada and XCITE badging. In June 2023, the company was officially re-registered as Lada Saint Petersburg LLC. That same month, Lada Saint Petersburg announced its first model, the Lada X-Cross 5 crossover, a badge engineered Bestune T77 from FAW.
