= Modèle 1978 helmet =

French military helmet

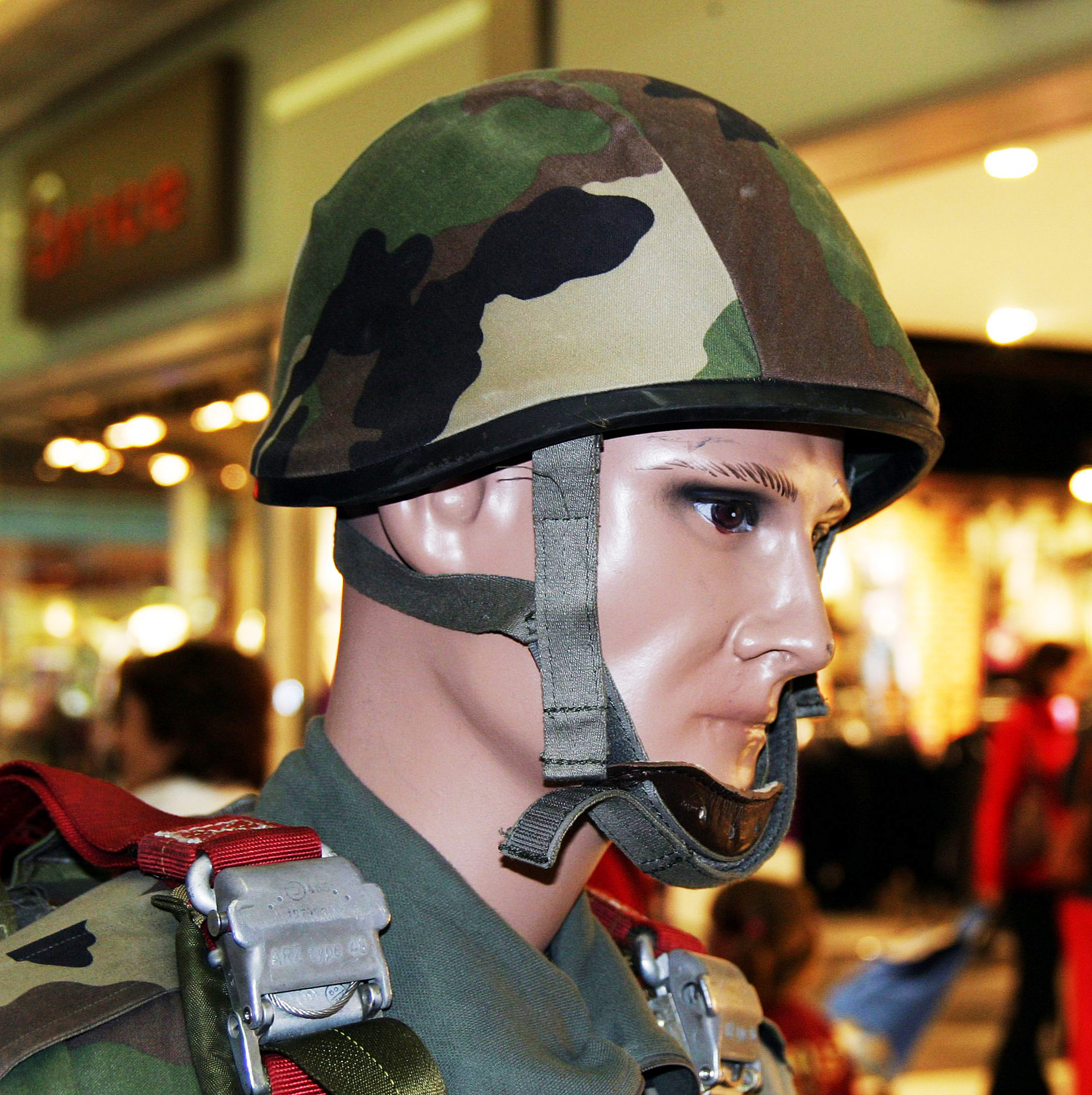
Uniform of a paratrooper of the troupes de Marine

The Modèle 1978 helmet is a modern military steel helmet used by the French Army under the F1 designation and commonly called "heavy helmet" (other nicknames include "locomotive skin cap"). It replaced the Modèle 1951 helmet. It was the standard helmet for both the Army and the Mobile Gendarmerie. In 1992 the SPECTRA helmet started to supersede the Modèle 1978. The SPECTRA helmet is made of Spectra fiber, which makes the Modèle 1978 the last French helmet made of steel.

== Design and production ==
The Modèle 1978 is a one-piece helmet made 1.2mm of amagnetic steel, weighing 1.2 kg. They were usually painted in NATO olive paint with IR-isolating properties to reduce the thermal signature of the wearer. It was made by the Dunois company in Cousance, and by GIAT in Rennes. By 1983, some 300,000 helmets were in service, for a total of 700,000 planned.

== History ==
Research on the Modèle 1978 helmet started around 1973. In contrast to the Modèle 1951 helmet, the new model was a one-piece heavy helmet, rather than consisting of a light liner underneath a stronger metal helmet. Prototypes went for testing in the 1st Parachute Chasseur Regiment, the 75th Infantry Regiment and the 13th Bataillon de Chasseurs Alpins.

On 5 June 1978, the French Army adopted prototypes helmet A4 and chin strap A5 as the Modèle 1978 helmet. Usage by paratroopers, in particular, yielded improvements to the chin strap to avoid accidents. The modified variant entered service in 1982 as the F1 série 2 helmet. The helmet can be fitted with a plastic camouflage covering.

The Modèle 1978 helmet saw its baptism of fire with the Multinational Force in Lebanon in 1982.

== Users ==
- France
- Lebanon
- Morocco

== Citations and references ==
Citations

References

- Coune, Frédéric (1984). Les casques militaires franc̦ais 1864-2015. Paris: Histoire & Collections. ISBN 9782352504269. OCLC 927363934.
- Dagnas, Jean-Gabriel (1984). Les casques de combat du monde entier de 1915 à nos jours. Limoges: Lavauzelle. ISBN 9782702500514. OCLC 84566886.
- Spencer Kidd, R (2013). Military uniforms in Europe 1900 - 2000. Vol. 2. Lulu.com. ISBN 9781291187465.
- McNab, Chris; Dréer, Francis; Richard, Olivier (2012). Uniformes et tenues de combat : encyclopédie visuelle. Paris: Elcy Éditions. ISBN 9782753205840. OCLC 822873180.
