= Shengrui Transmission =

Chinese automatic transmissions manufacturer

Shengrui Transmission is an automatic transmissions manufacturer based in Weifang, Shandong Province, China. It is a relative newcomer, founded in 2003. It is in partnership with Ricardo plc in developing an automatic transmission.

Shandong Shenrui Transmission 山东盛瑞 is a subsidiary of Shandong Wei Cai Diesel Engine Manufacturer and a part supplier to it. Shenrui contracted Ricardo of UK in 2009 to design 8-speed Automatic Transmission for it for 1 million British Pound. The 8-AT was produced but not without problems. Without any experiences to solve the problems, Shenrui contracted Ricardo to help solve problems mainly on calibration and drivability issues and paid another 1 million pound. After almost 5 years, finally the 8-AT found its first customer, JMC, 江铃. JMC use Shenrui 8-AT on its new Land Rover look alike SUV, the X-7. Since X-7 offered only automatic transmission version, a very unusual move in China, the vehicle SOP date was delayed for more than 6 month due to 8-AT problems. The X-7 SUV is now (as of December 2015) selling at more than 6000 units a month, so does the Shenrui 8-AT.
