= Bestune T99 =

Mid-size crossover SUV

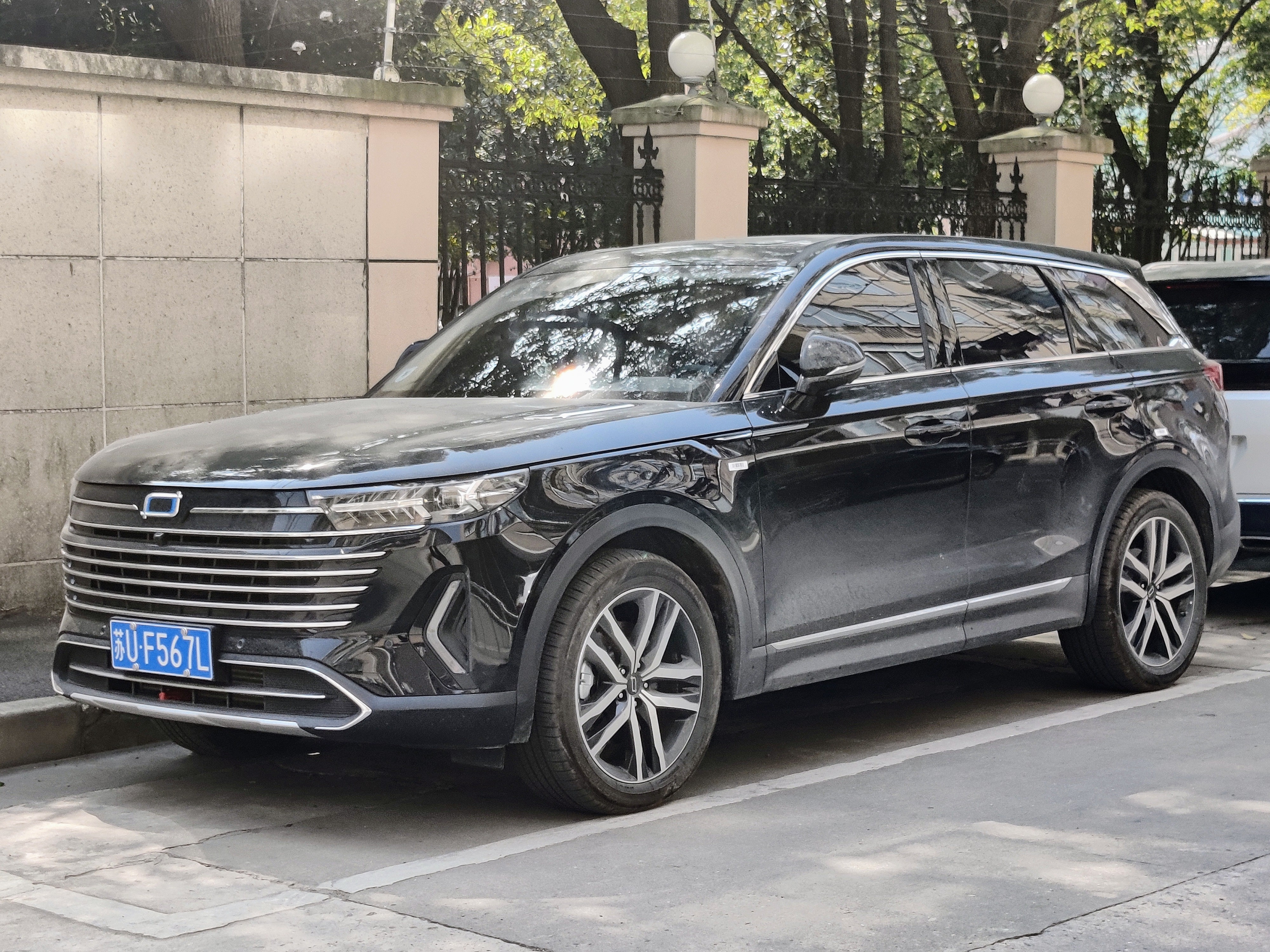

Overview
- Manufacturer: Bestune (FAW Group)
- Model code: D058
- Production: 2019–2025 (China); 2022–present (export)
- Model years: 2020–2025 (China); 2023–present (export)
- Assembly: China: Changchun

Body and chassis
- Class: Mid-size crossover SUV
- Body style: 5-door SUV
- Layout: Front-engine, front-wheel drive

Powertrain
- Engine: 2.0 L CA4GC20TD-32 Turbo I4
- Power output: 165 kW (224 PS; 221 hp)
- Transmission: 6-speed Aisin automatic; 8-speed Shengrui automatic

Dimensions
- Wheelbase: 2,870 mm (113.0 in)
- Length: 4,800 mm (189.0 in)
- Width: 1,915 mm (75.4 in)
- Height: 1,685 mm (66.3 in)
- Curb weight: 1,775 kg (3,913 lb)

The Bestune T99 is a mid-size crossover SUV produced by the FAW Group under the brand name Bestune. It is positioned above the Bestune T77.

== History ==
The FAW Group presented a first preview of the crossover at the Auto Shanghai in April 2019 with the T2 Concept. The 4.80 m long series model was presented in September 2019. The T99 has been on sale in China since 1 November 2019.

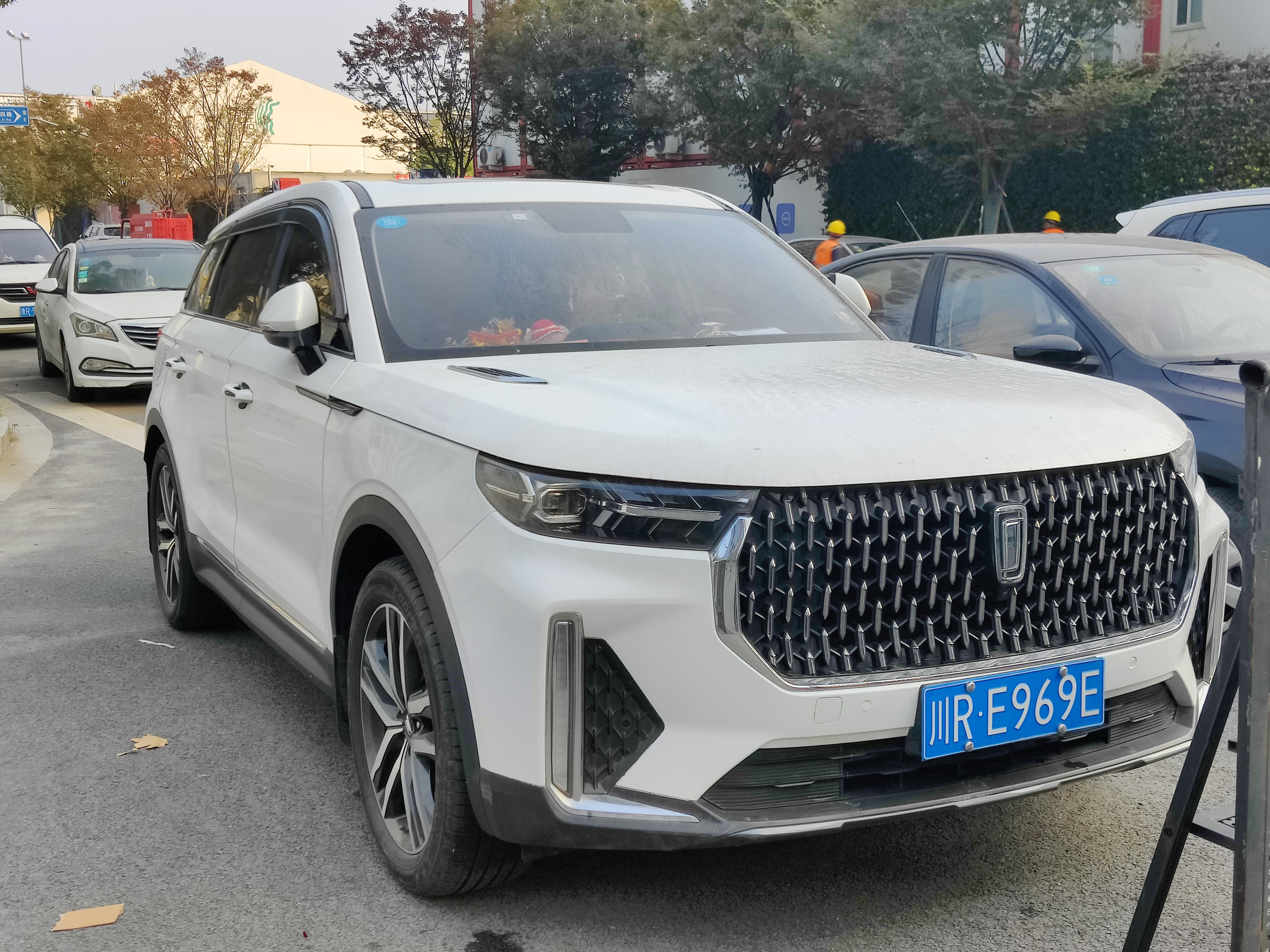
Bestune T99 (pre-facelift)

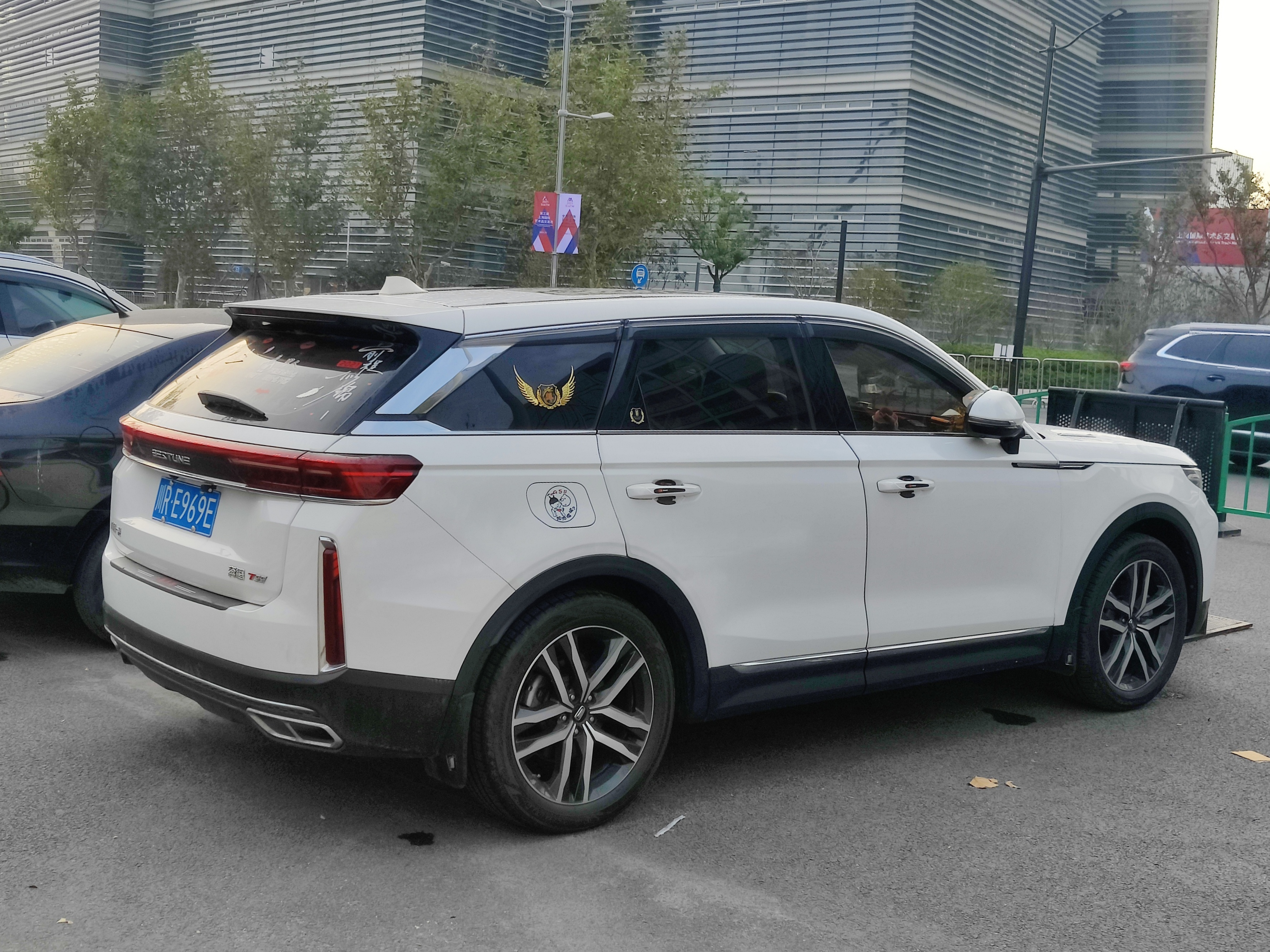
Rear view

== Overview ==
=== Infotainment ===
As a special feature, the manufacturer offers the vehicle with a holographic assistant. This assistant displays a holographic image on the dashboard. It supports the driver in essential functions of the vehicle - for example air conditioning control - and is addressed by voice control.

=== 2023 facelift ===
In December 2022, the Bestune T99 received a facelift or the 2023 model year alongside the T77 facelift. The front end has been completely redesigned with the rear end slightly restyled. For the interior, three LCD displays including a dual 12.3-inch LCD screen for dashboard and central control display plus a 7-inch LCD touch-screen air-conditioning control panel. The controls on the steering wheel are upgraded to touch-type, and the facelift model is also equipped with a handle-type electronic gearshift.

In terms of power, the updated Bestune T99 is unchanged.

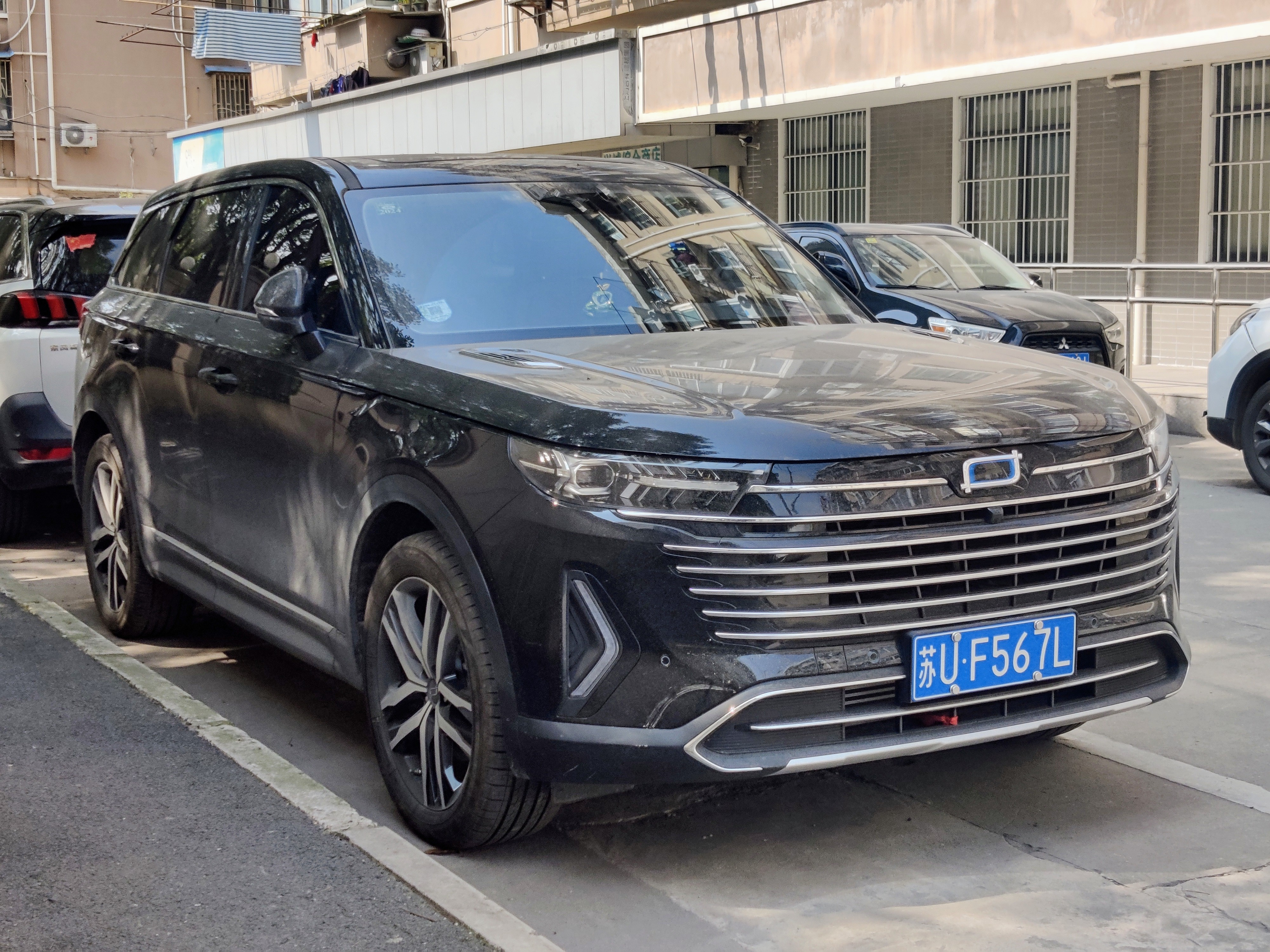
Bestune T99 2023 (facelift)

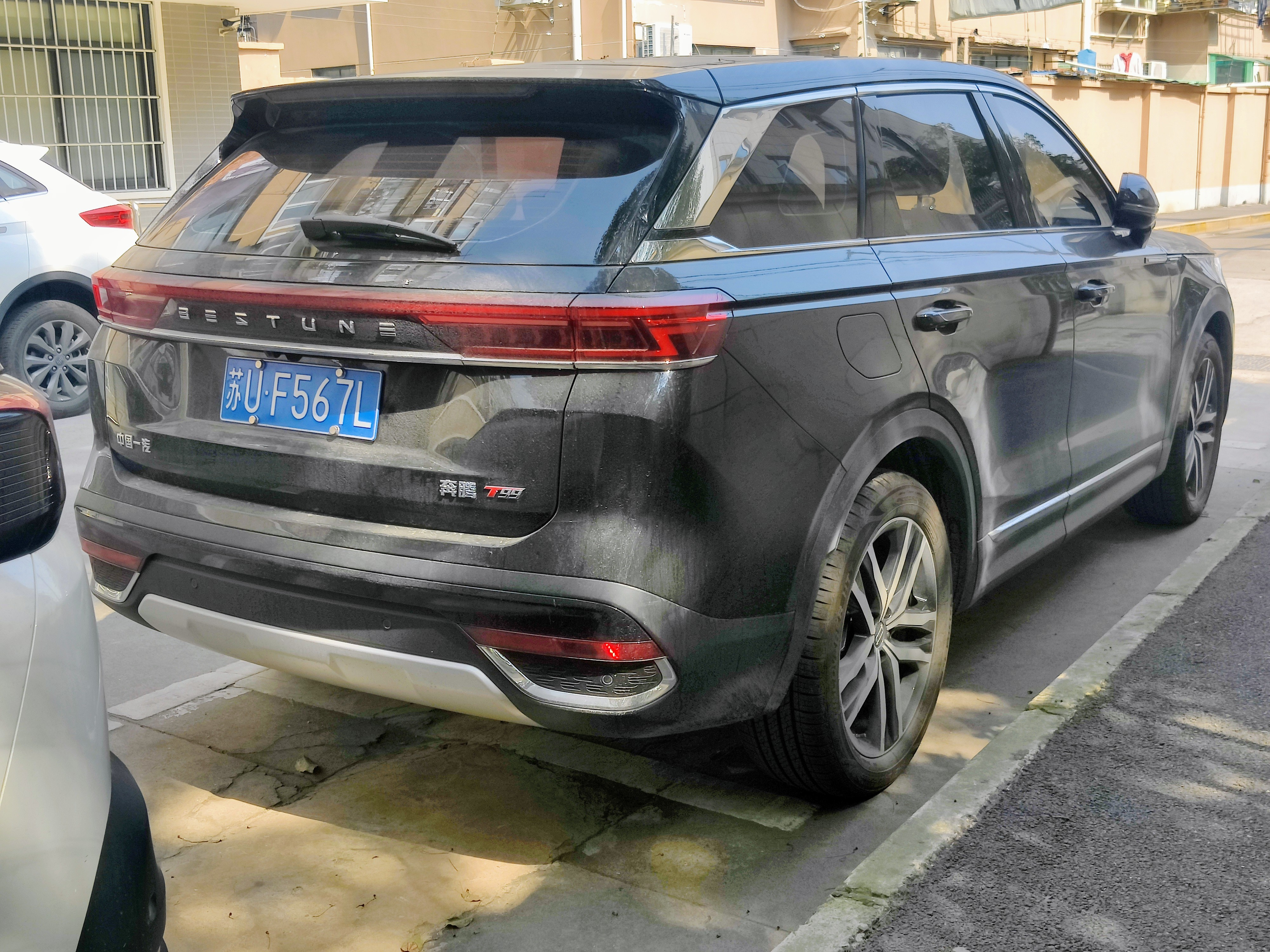
Rear view

== Technical specifications ==
The T99 is powered by a turbocharged two-liter petrol engine with 165 kW (224 PS; 221 hp) between 4,500 and 5,500 rpm and a maximum torque of 340 N⋅m (251 lb⋅ft; 35 kg⋅m) between 1,650 and 4,500 rpm. A 6-speed automatic transmission from Aisin Seiki has also been available since June 2020. An 8-speed automatic transmission from Shengrui is used.
