= Bestune T77 =

Compact crossover SUV

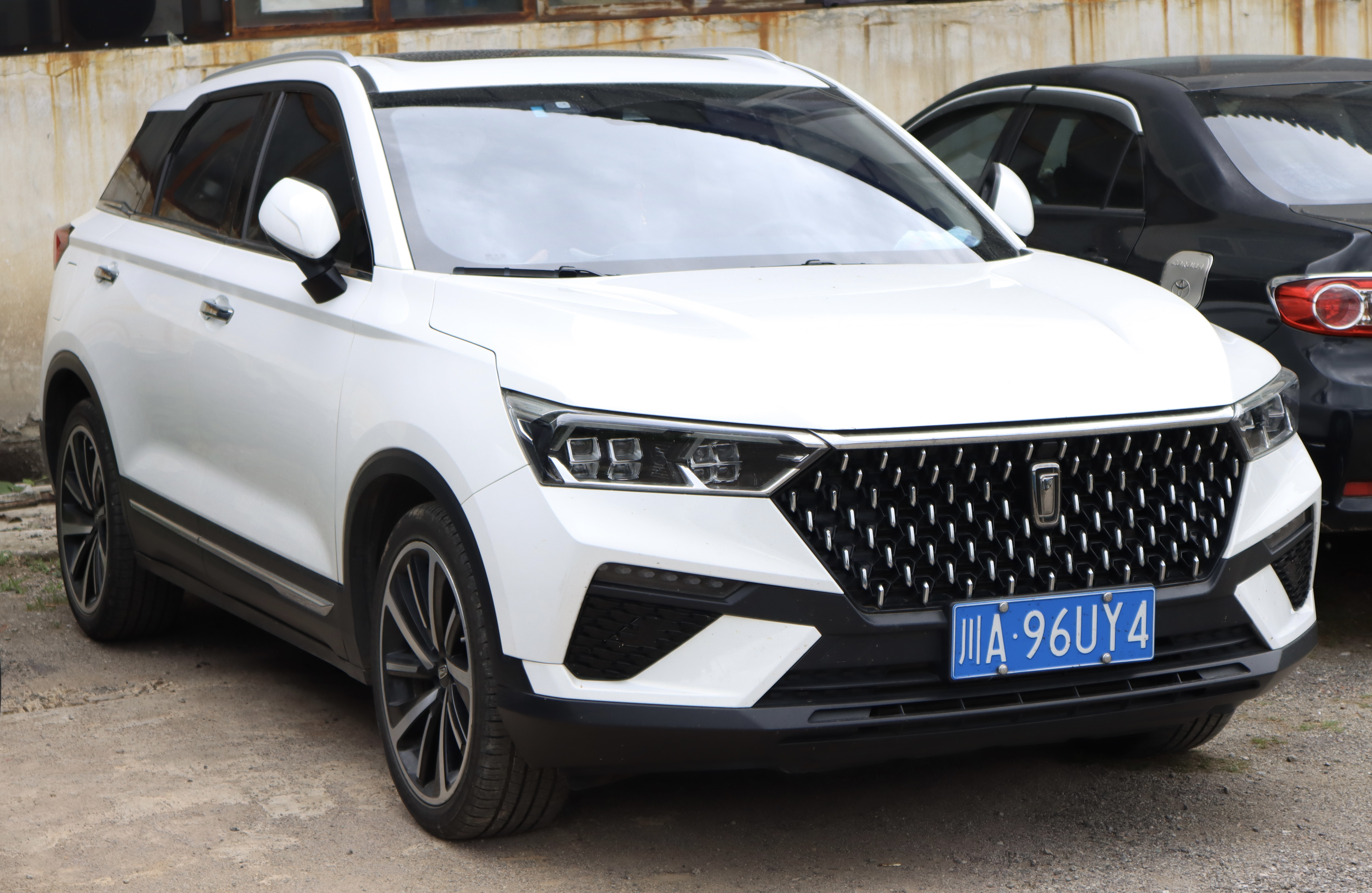
- Bestune T77 (pre-facelift)

Overview
- Manufacturer: Bestune (FAW Group)
- Also called: FAW Bestune T77; Lada X-Cross 5 (cancelled)
- Production: 2018–2025 (China); 2020–present (export)
- Assembly: China: Changchun; Russia: St. Petersburg (Lada Saint Petersburg)

Body and chassis
- Class: Compact crossover SUV (C)
- Body style: 5-door SUV
- Layout: Front-engine, front-wheel-drive

Powertrain
- Engine: Petrol: 1.2 L CA4GA12TD I4; 1.5 L CA4GB15TD-30 I4
- Transmission: 6-speed manual 7-speed DCT

Dimensions
- Wheelbase: 2,600 mm (102.4 in)
- Length: 4,525 mm (178.1 in)
- Width: 1,845 mm (72.6 in)
- Height: 1,615 mm (63.6 in)
- Curb weight: 1,468–1,515 kg (3,236–3,340 lb)

The Bestune T77 is a compact crossover SUV produced by the FAW Group under the brand name Bestune.

== Overview ==
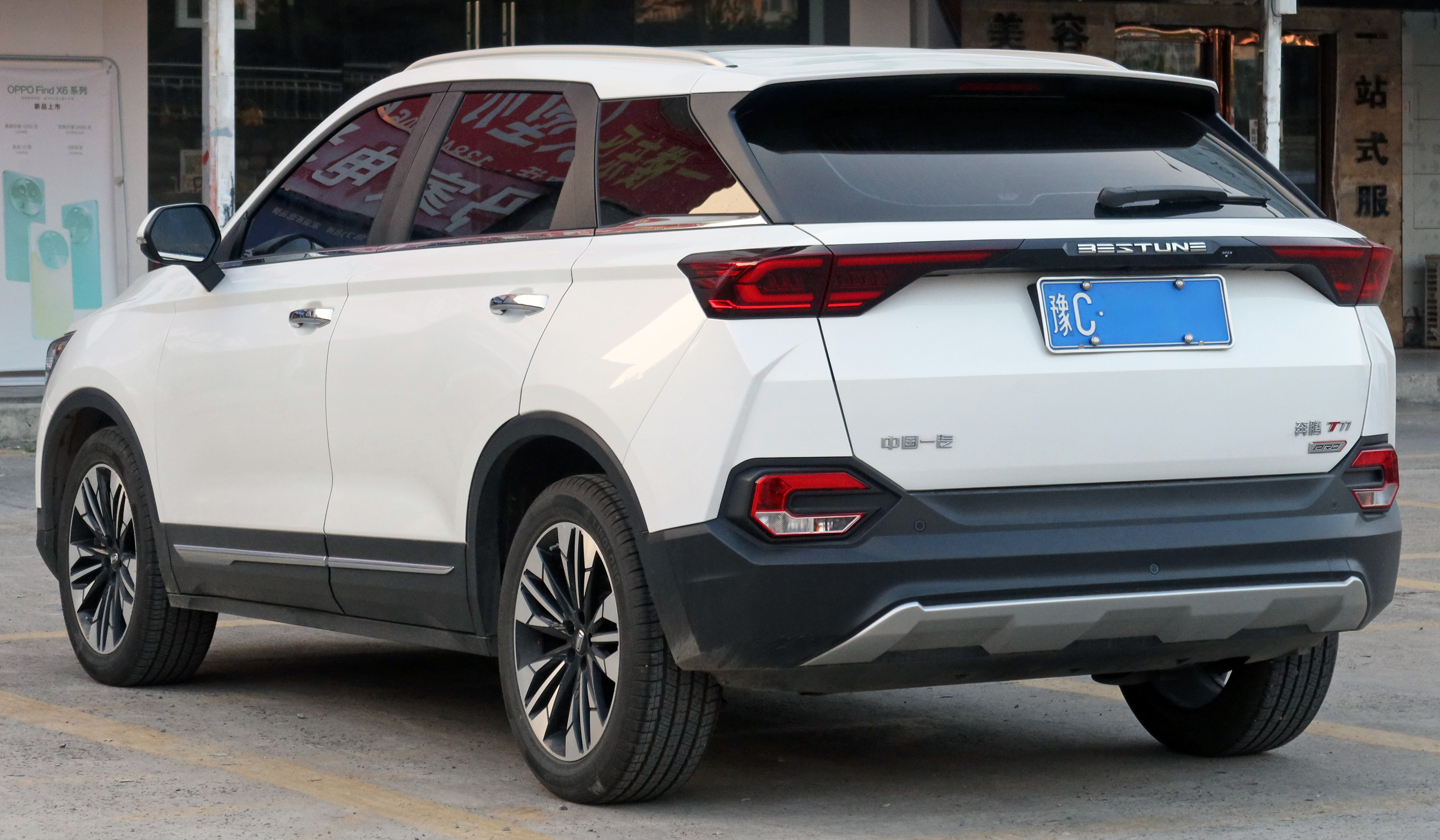
Rear view

The Bestune compact crossover was first introduced at the Beijing Auto Show in April 2018 as the Bestern T-Concept. The production model debuted at the Guangzhou Auto Show in November of the same year. Since then, the T77 is sold in China.

The Bestune T77 is the first vehicle marketed by FAW under a new international name "Bestune" instead of "Besturn". The Chinese brand name remains unchanged.

The interior of the Bestune T77 features a holographic assistant called the holographic intelligent control system. The system comes with three characters, and five appearance options for each. The assistant can perform 43 different acts following voice commands. There are criticisms of one of the vehicle's holographic assistants (an anime girl) being referred to as "hot".

The Bestune T77 is powered by a 1.2-litre engine developing 143 horsepower (107 kW; 145 PS). The engine is paired with a five-speed manual gearbox or a seven-speed dual-clutch transmission, and is only available as a front-wheel-drive model. The FAW brand in Russia debuted the crossover as the Besturn X60 in fall 2020.

The Bestune T77 is 4,525mm (178in) long, 1,845mm (73in) wide, and 1,615mm (63in) tall. Additionally, it weighs 1,468-1,515kg and has a wheelbase or 2,700mm.

In March 2020, the T77 Pro variant was introduced to the Chinese market, equipped with the new Mitsubishi-derived 1.5-liter turbocharged four-cylinder direct-injection engine (CA4GB15TD-30), delivering 169 hp and 258 N·m of peak torque. This engine was paired with either a 6-speed manual transmission or a 7-speed wet dual-clutch automatic transmission (DF727) manufactured by Qingshan Industry. Visually, it underwent no major changes, with modifications limited to the interior of the front light clusters, which now feature matrix LEDs.

=== 2023 facelift ===
In December 2022, the facelift was unveiled and subsequently went on sale in China in the spring of 2023. It features the introduction of new front and rear bumpers, redesigned light clusters with a new internal LED pattern, and the new Bestune logo at both the front and rear. Inside, the automatic gear selector has been redesigned, and the layout of several physical controls on the center console has been optimized.The engine lineup consists solely of the 1.5 Turbo 169 hp, paired exclusively with the 7-speed DCT transmission

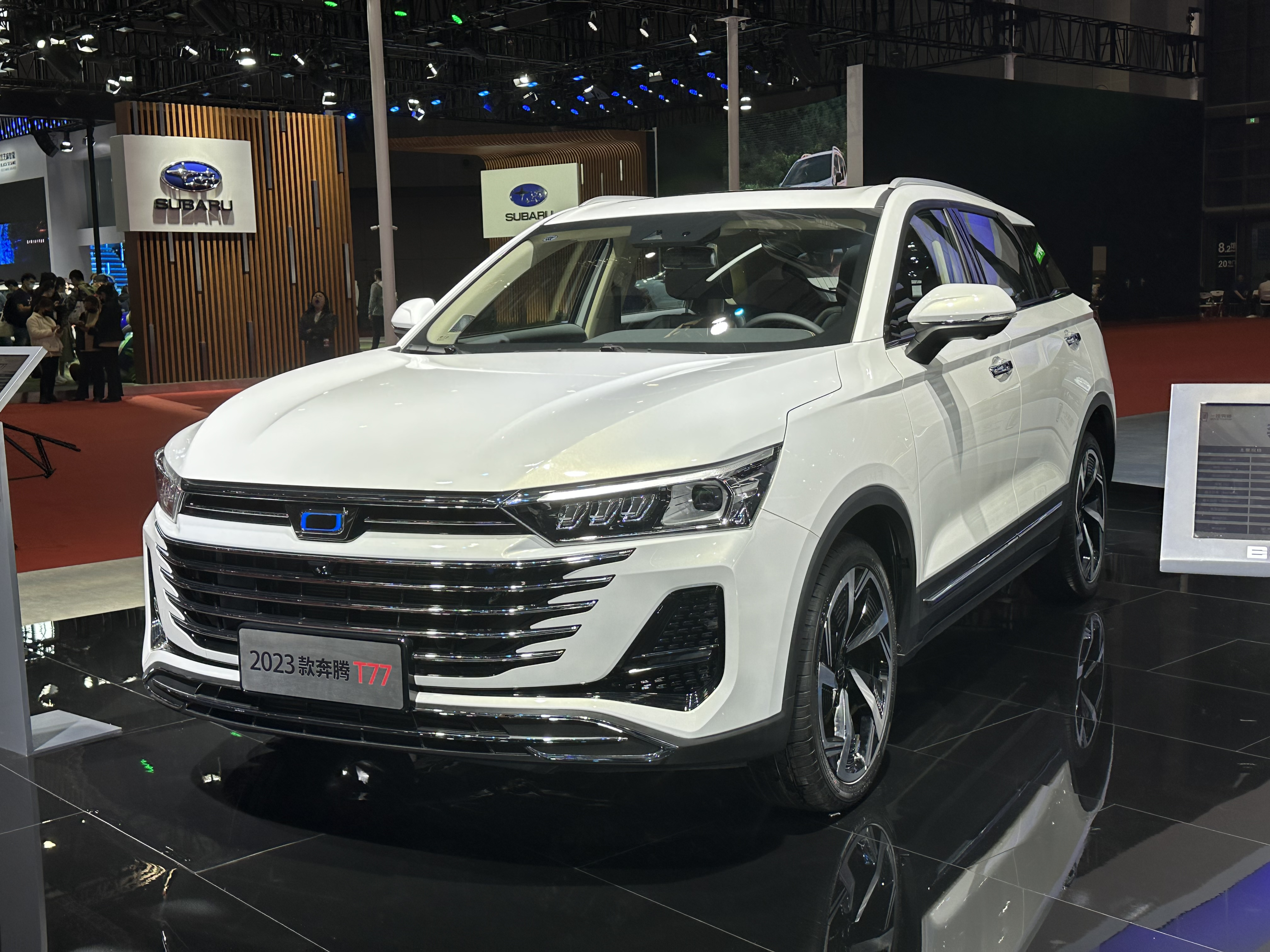
Bestune T77 2023 (facelift)

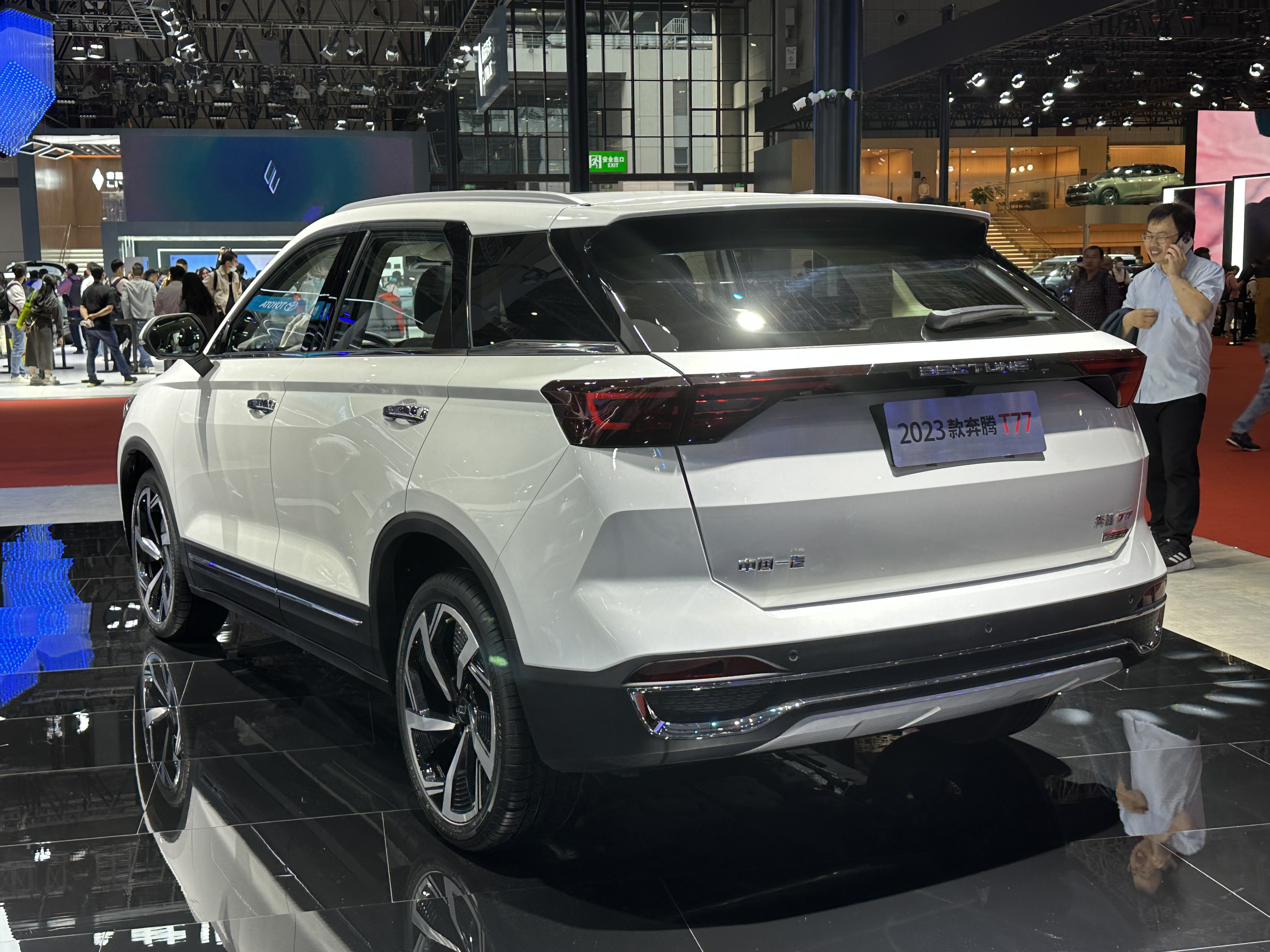
Rear view

== Export market ==
=== Europe ===
In Europe, it has been imported by local distributors since February 2026; the European T77 is based on the pre-facelift T77 Pro Chinese version (2020 design model) and features a 1.5-liter Turbo direct-injection engine with power reduced to 160 hp and 258 Nm of torque. The gearbox is a 7-speed dual-clutch automatic (DCT). The top speed is 181 km/h and the 0-100 km/h sprint takes 9.8 seconds. It is marketed in France, Spain, Germany, and Italy.

=== Russia ===
==== Lada X-Cross 5 ====
The Lada X-Cross 5 is a rebadged Bestune T77 launched in June 2023 for the Russian market and is produced at the AvtoVAZ plant in Saint Petersburg, which was previously owned by Nissan.

Production lasted only 6 months. Between June and December 2023, a total of only 170 units were assembled. The car never arrived at dealerships for private customers. The 170 produced units were entirely allocated to AvtoVAZ's internal and corporate fleet or sold directly to corporate and government customers.

== Sales ==
Year	China
2023	4,984
2024	4,599
2025	1,223
