= M84 camouflage pattern =

Danish military camouflage pattern

M84 camouflage pattern M/84 Pletsløring
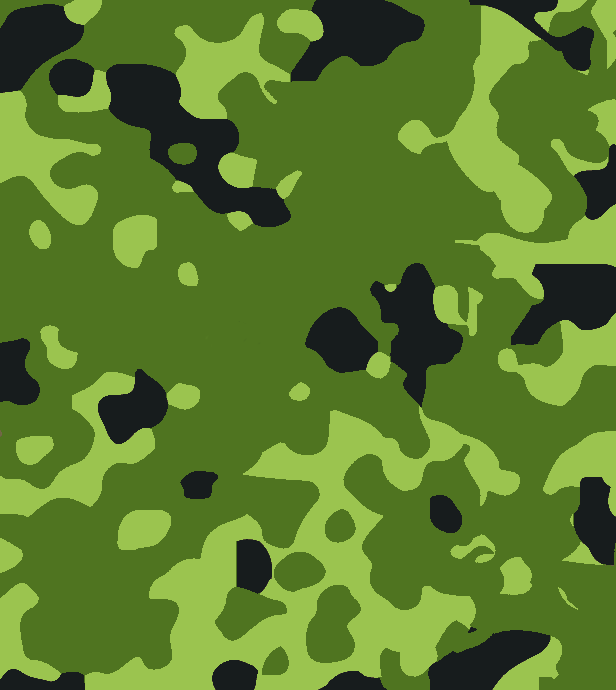
- Camo pattern of the M84
- Type: Military camouflage pattern
- Place of origin: Denmark

Service history
- In service: 1984–present
- Used by: Danish Defence; See Other users for non-Danish users
- Wars: Bosnian War (1992–1995); Afghanistan War (2001–2021); Iraq War; War in Ukraine (2014–present)

Production history
- Designer: Marquardt & Schulz (Note: Based on the Flecktarn B camo pattern)
- Designed: 1978 (T/78 first presented, but not used)
- Variants: See Variants for details on the camo patterns used

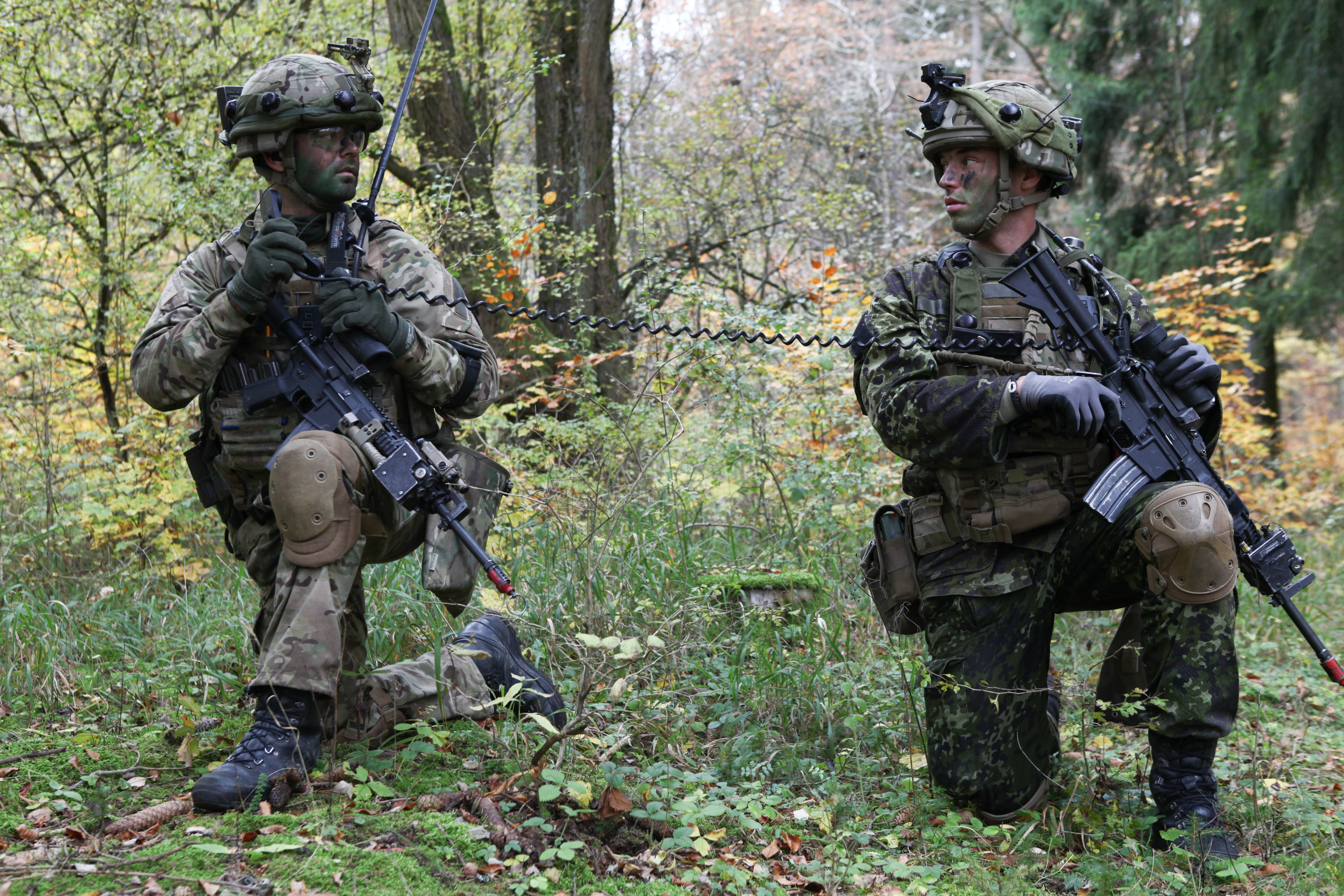
M/11 (left) M/84 (right)

The M/84 camouflage pattern (Danish: M/84 Pletsløring, lit. 'M/84 spot camouflage'), is the former camouflage pattern of the Danish military. The M/84 is a derivative of the Flecktarn B pattern produced by the German firm Marquardt & Schulz. Using the same shapes and pattern, the number of colours was changed from 5 to 3 – choosing olive green, light green and black to better match the colouration of the Danish woodland environment.

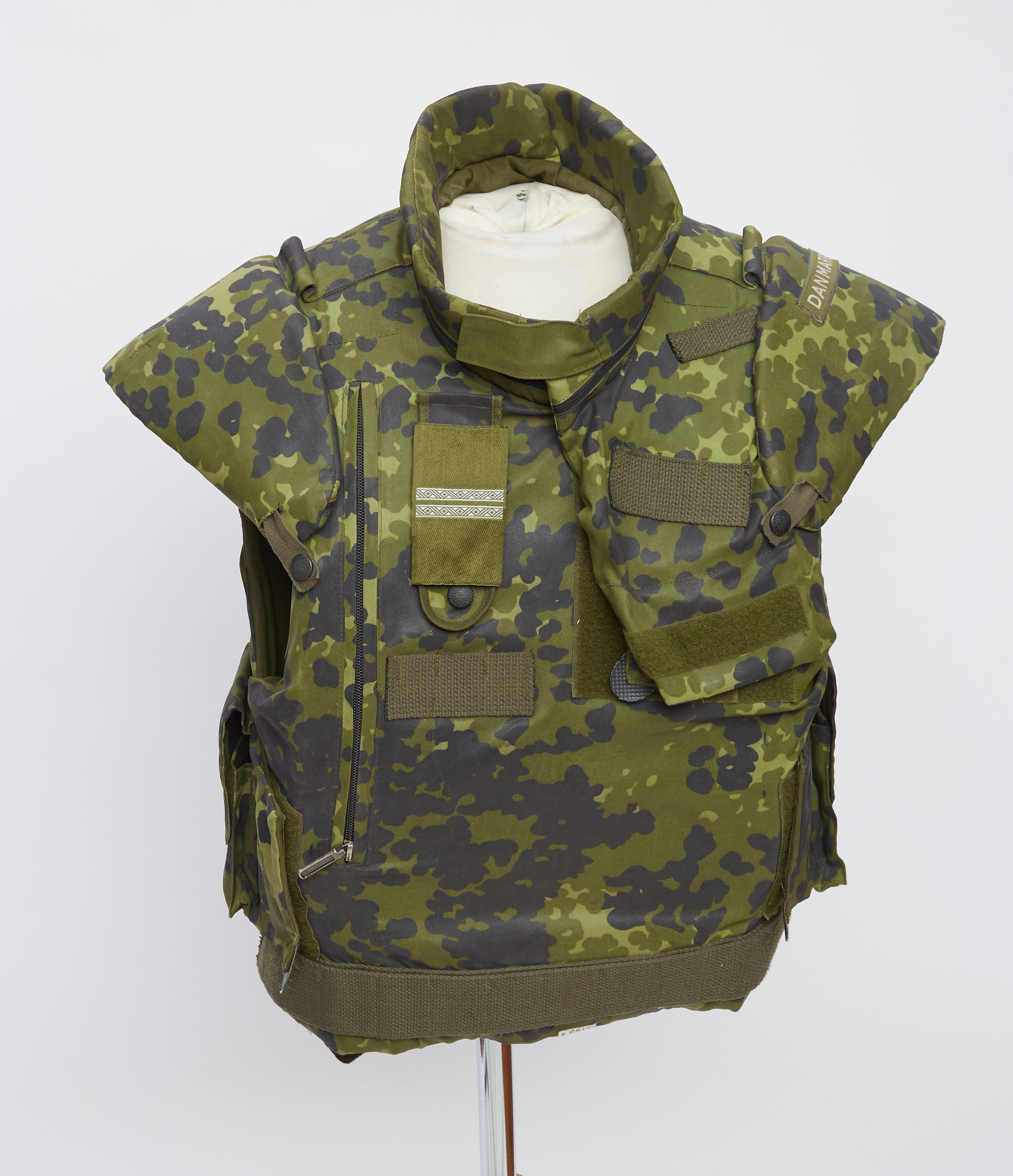
M84 pattern

The use of spots creates a "dithering" effect, which eliminates hard boundaries between the different colors in much the same way the squares in the newest digital camouflage patterns do. The pattern is designed for use in temperate woodland terrain.

Two desert versions of the pattern, T/99 and M/01, were created for Danish operations in arid environments. It has since mostly been replaced by M/11.

== History ==
In the early 1970s the Danish Defence was looking for a replacement for the olive-grey M/58 combat uniform, with the German Flecktarn chosen as basis for the new camouflage. In 1978, the T/78 was presented, though it was never adopted but it eventually evolved into the M/84 pattern in 1984, hence the name — Model 1984. The name was also adopted for the uniform system which utilized the camouflage. The M/84 saw wider use, when given to the Baltic countries as military support.

In 1999, members of the SHIRBRIG were issued a desert version M/84, during the UN mission in Ethiopia and Eritrea. The desert was further improved into the M/01 in 2001 for Danish troops in Afghanistan. In 2012, Danish Defence announced it would replace the M/84 and M/01 with MultiCam, dubbed M/11.

=== Modern use ===
The M/84 has been replaced by the M/11 in the Danish Defence Forces in 2018, and is only in limited use with the Home Guard. It is very sought after by collectors and enthusiasts, due to the quality and rarity. Furthermore, both an Urban and Snow version have been produced for commercial use.

The adoption of the M/11 allowed for the phasing out of the M/01, which took place during a command transition between the 14th and 15th ISAF contingents.

== Other users ==
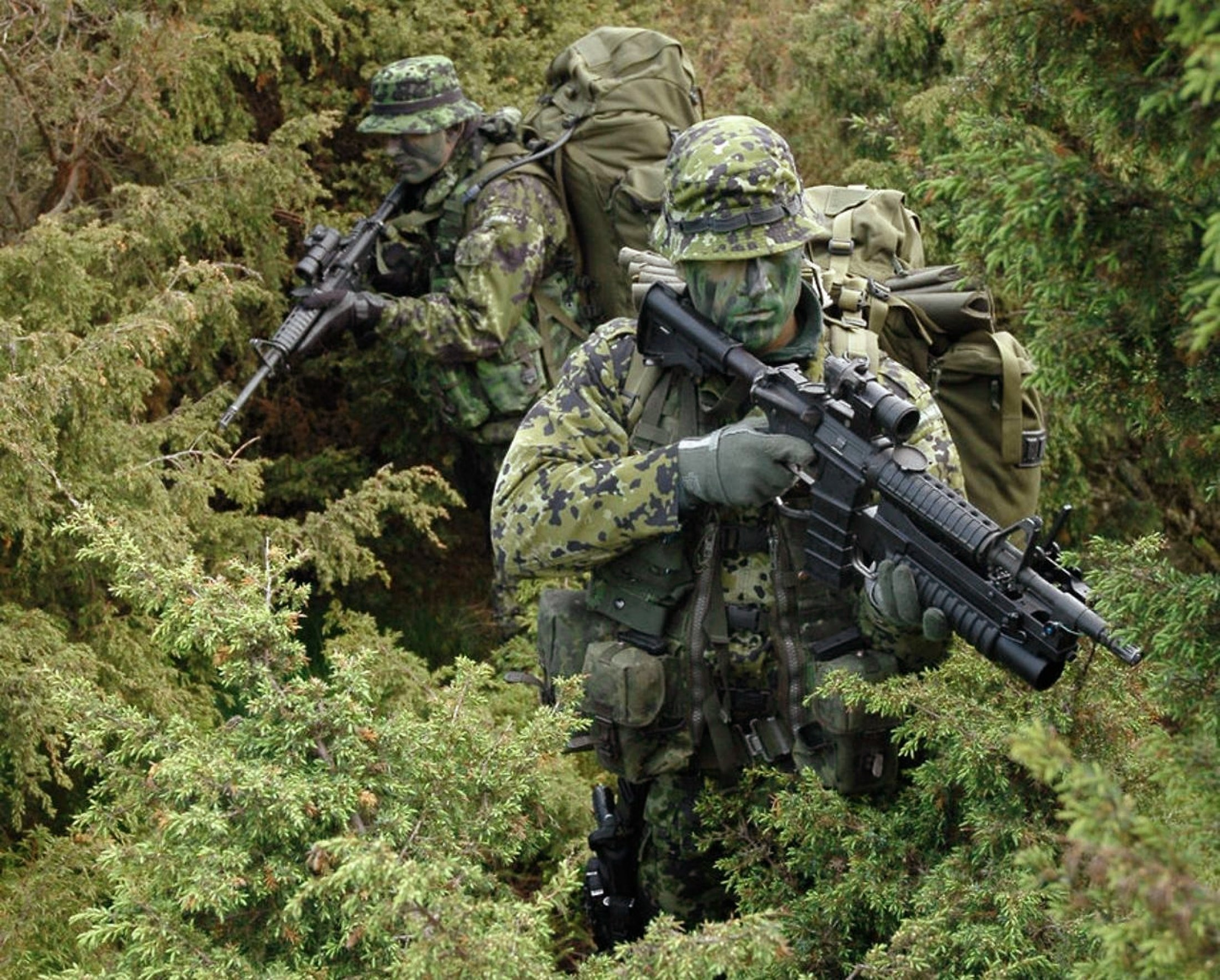
Soldiers from the Danish SSR using the M/84 camouflage

- Estonia: Given to the Estonians by the Danish government.
- France: Special Forces use the snow version.
- Latvia: Given to the Latvians by the Danish government.
- Lithuania: Given to the Lithuanians by the Danish government.
- Sweden: National Task Force.
- Turkey: Used by Underwater Offence Group Command.

== Variants ==
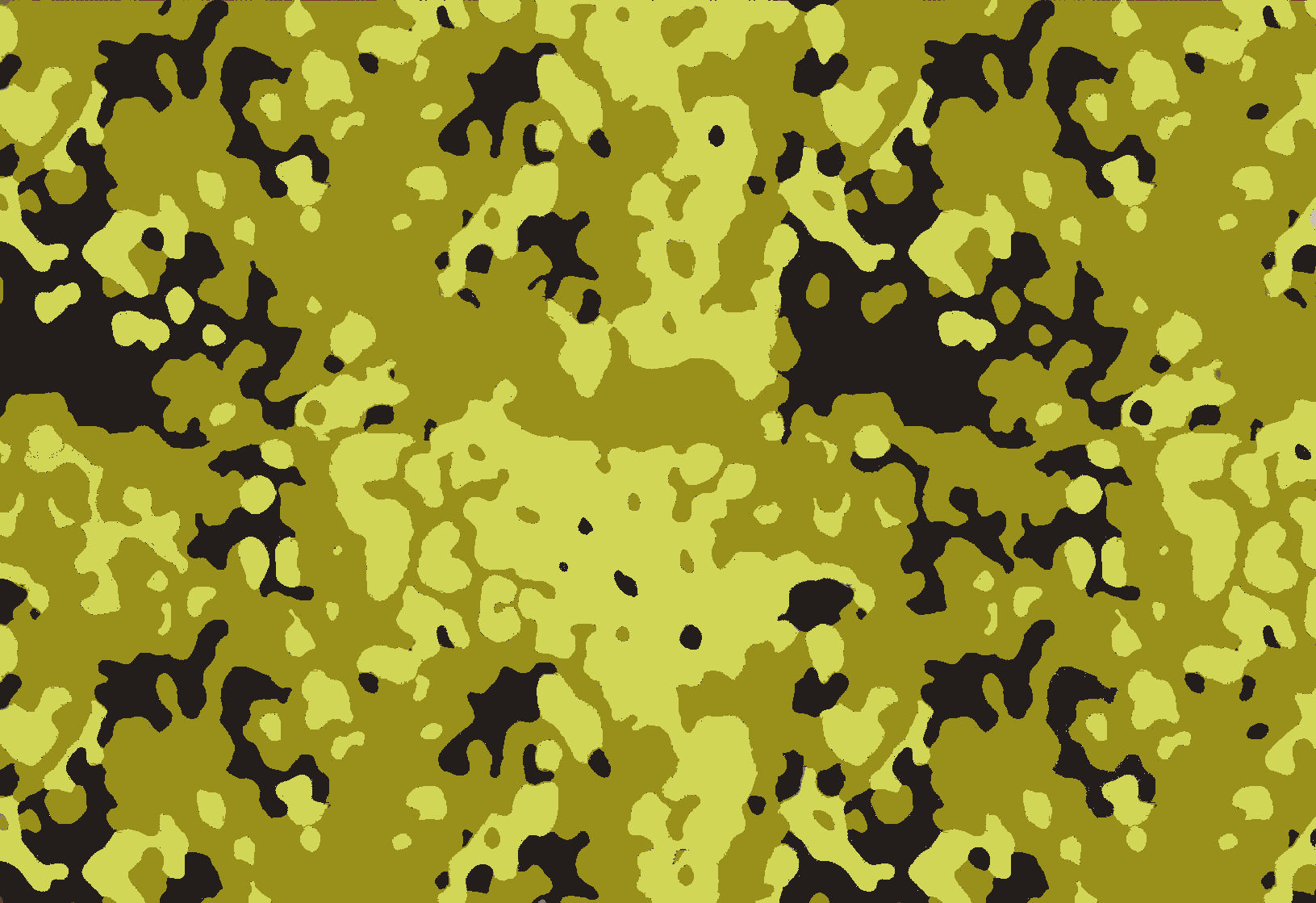
Trial version T/78

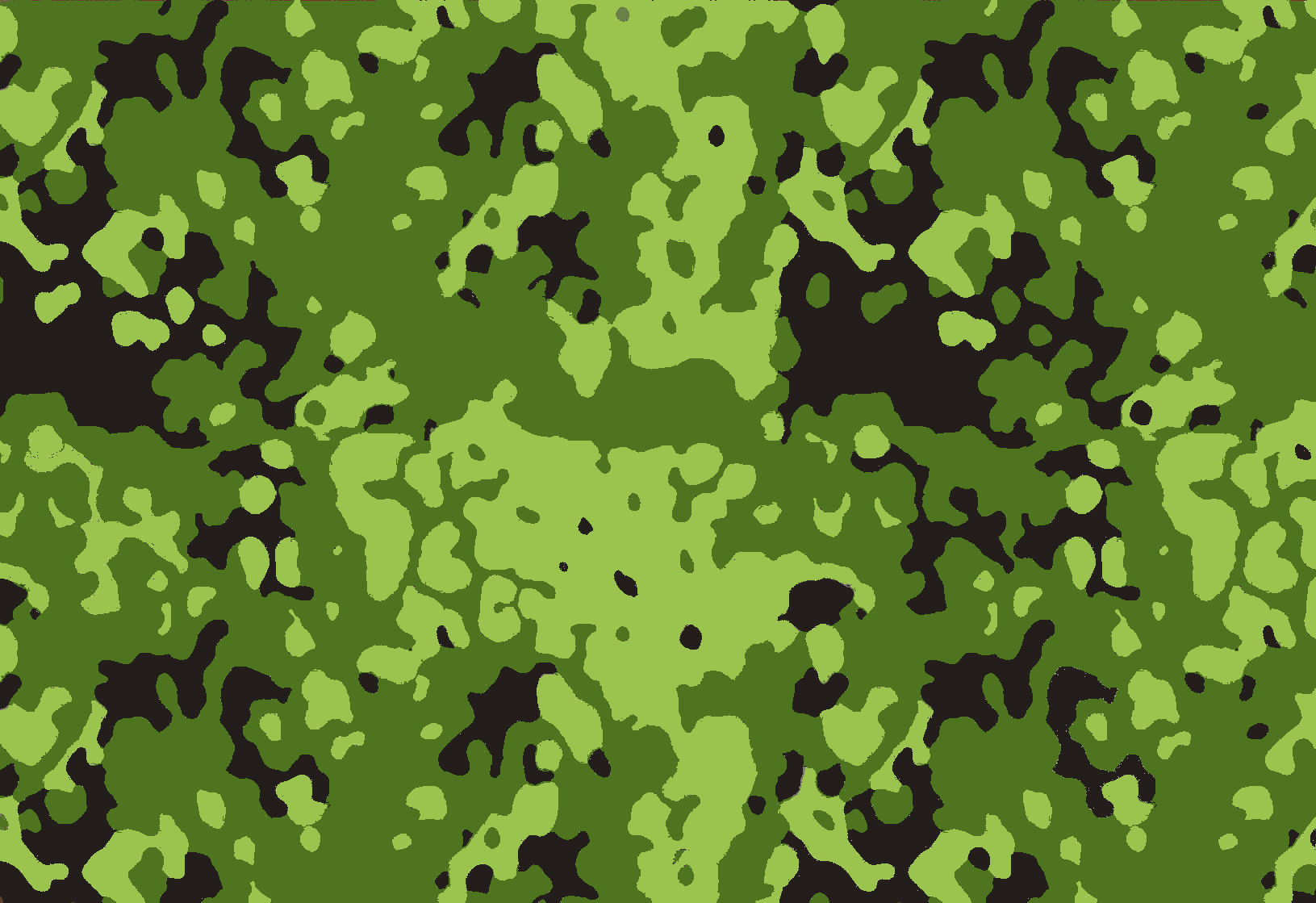
M/84

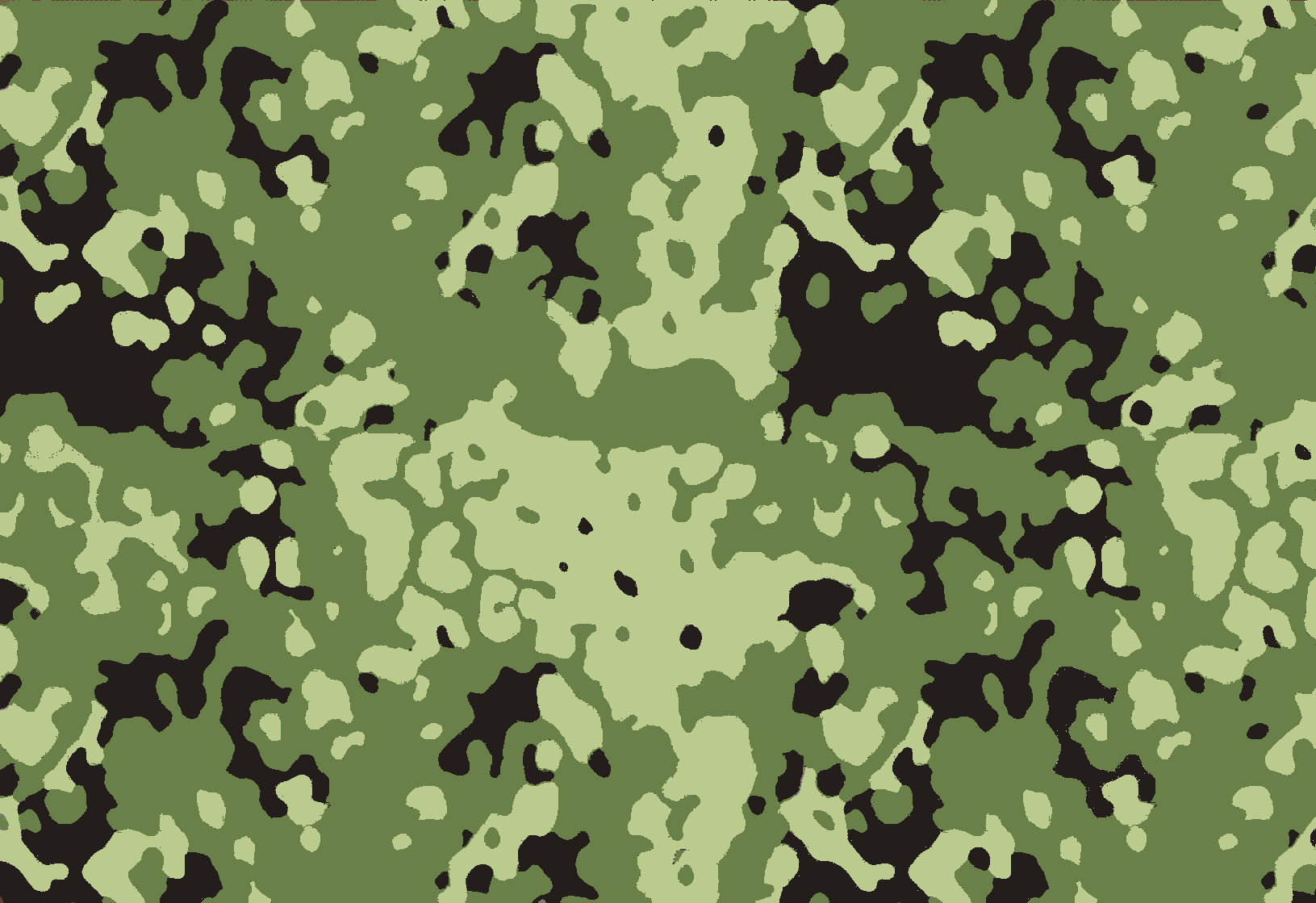
T/90

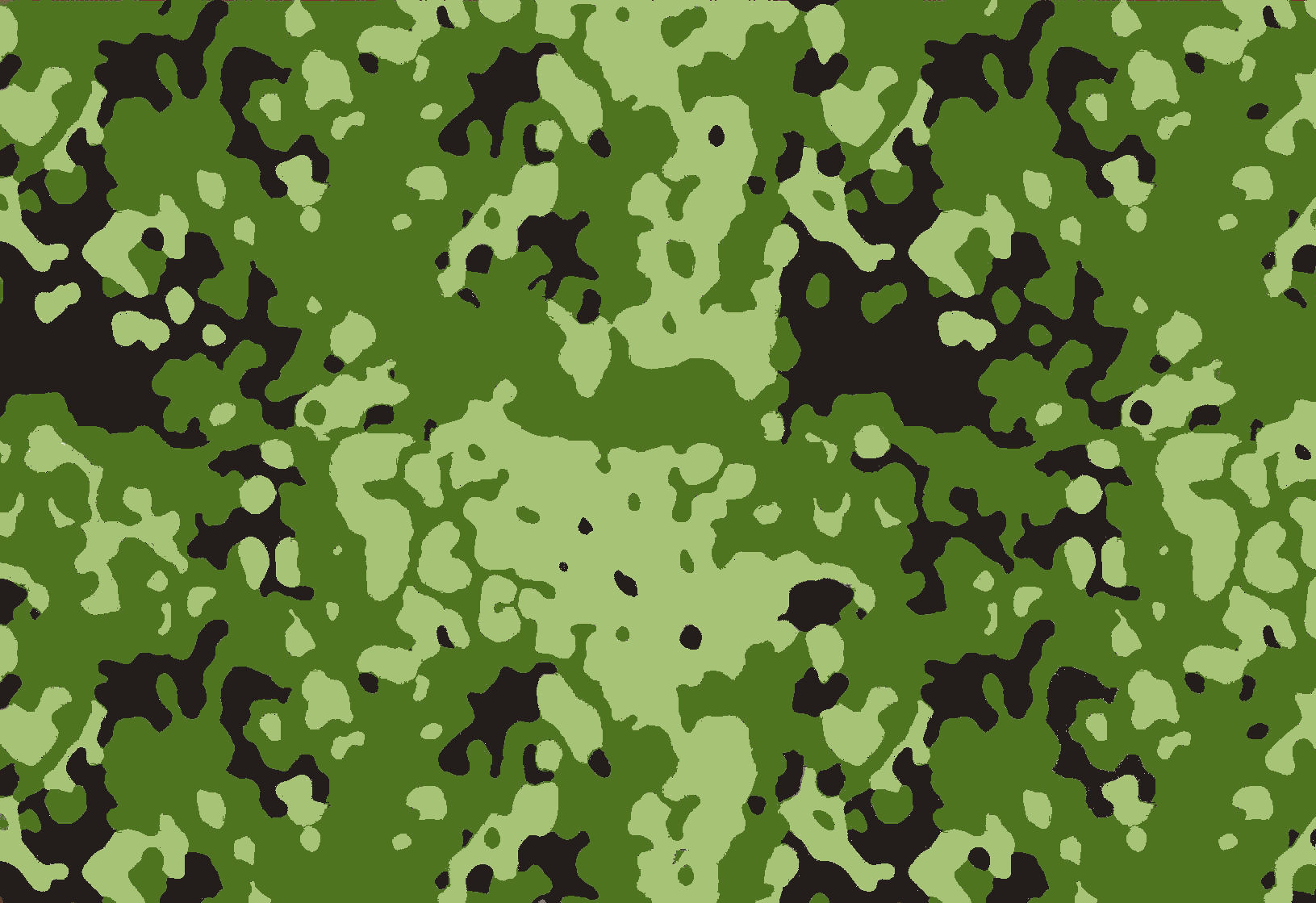
T/96

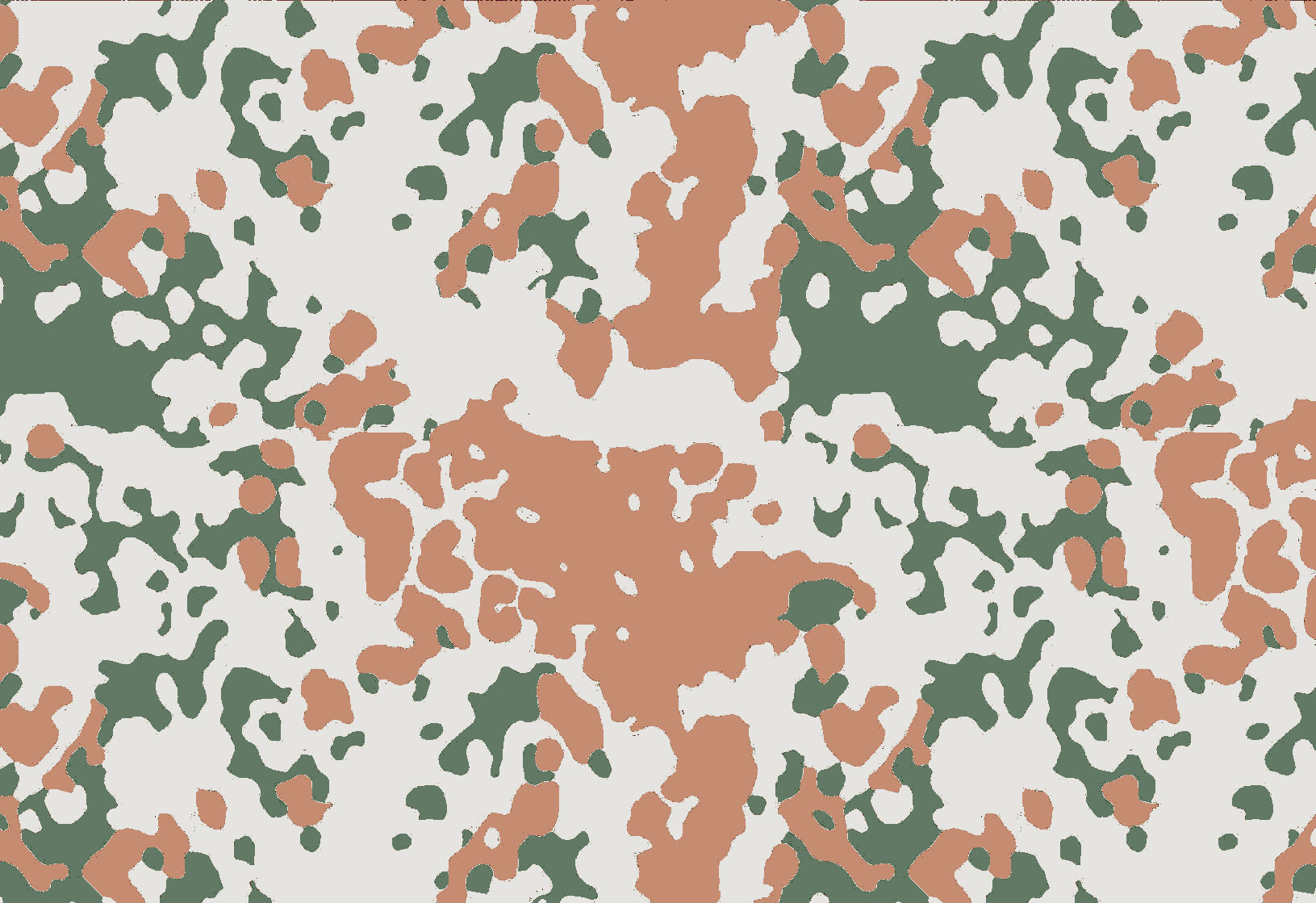
Desert version T/99

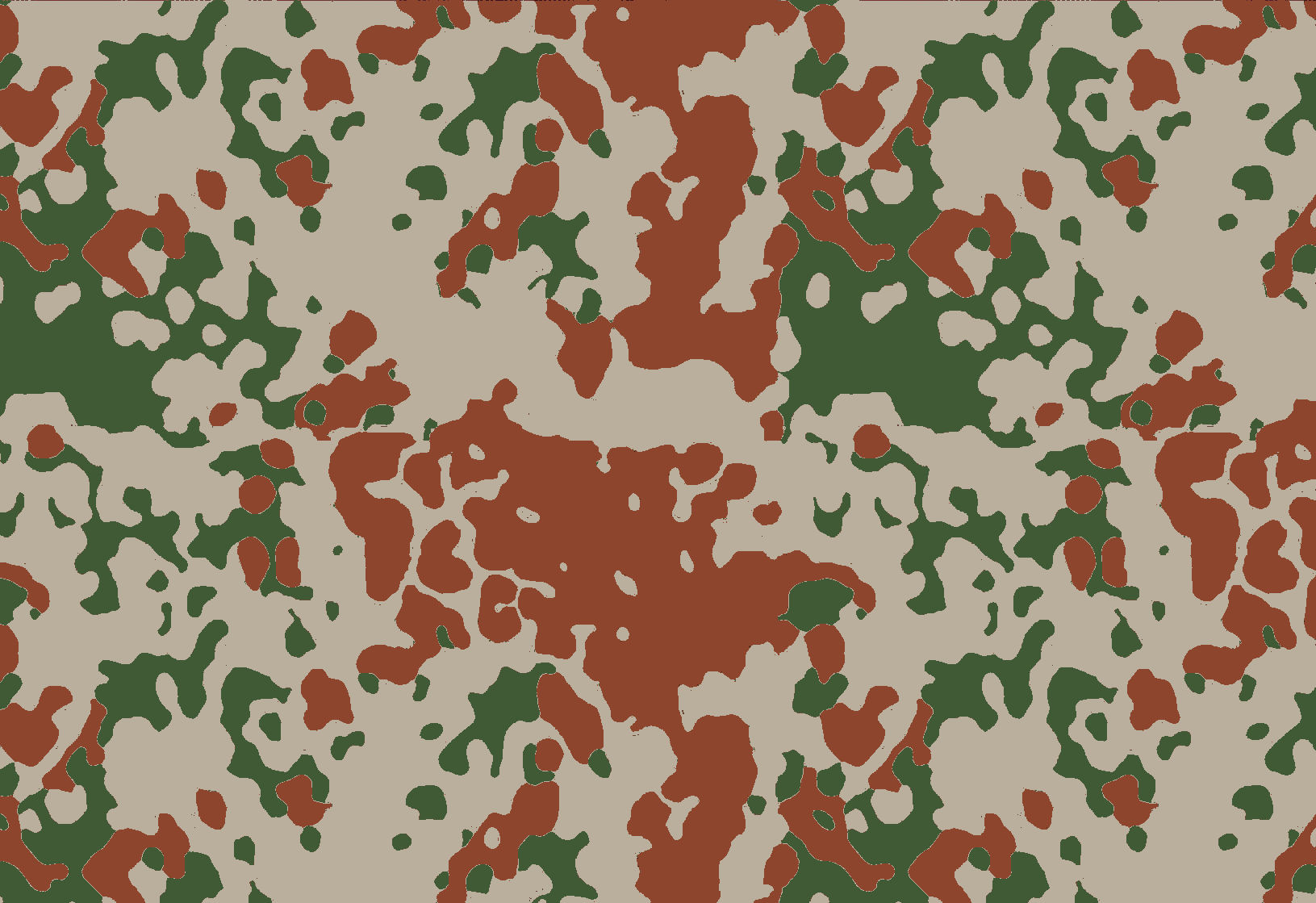
Desert version M/01

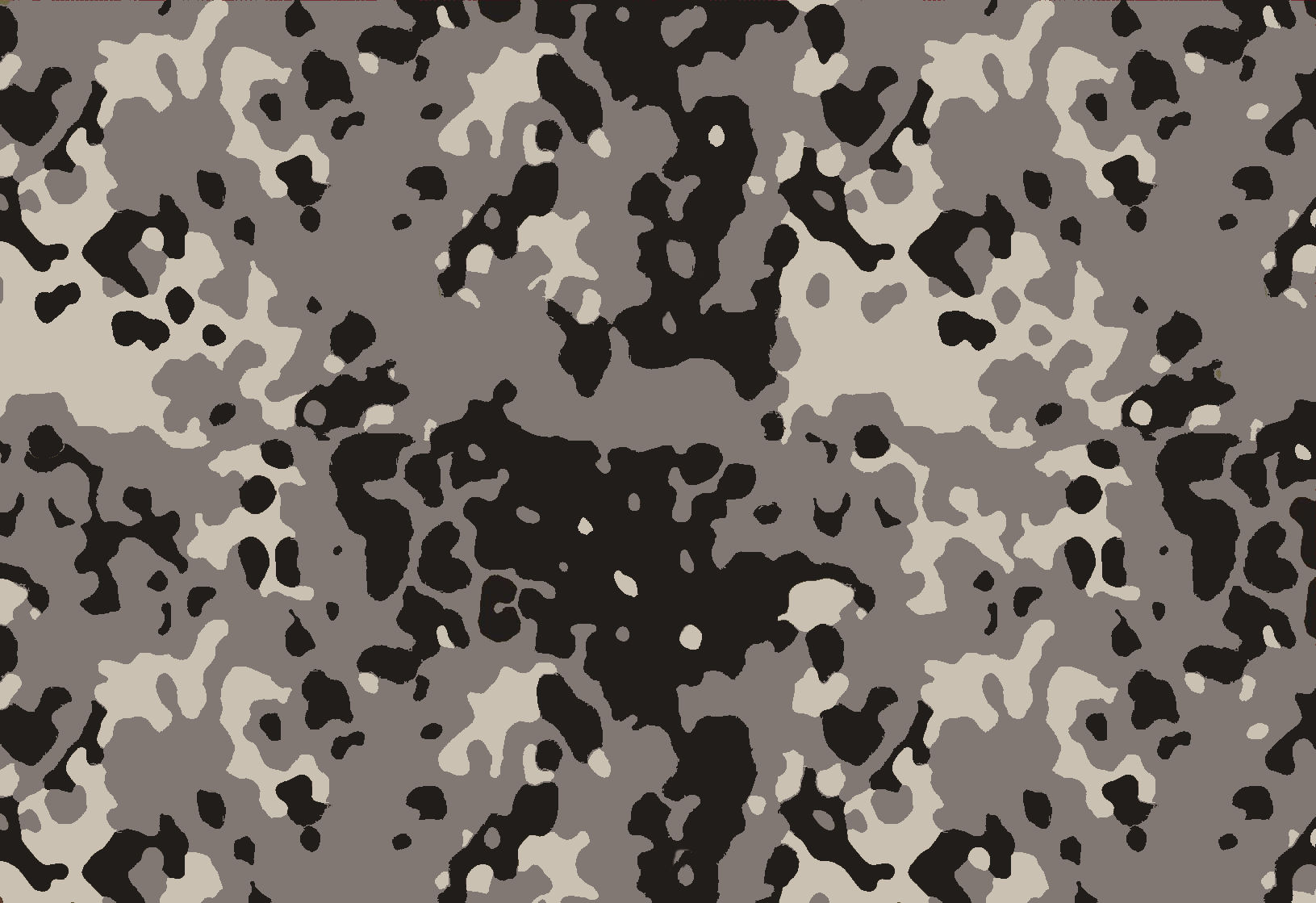
Urban

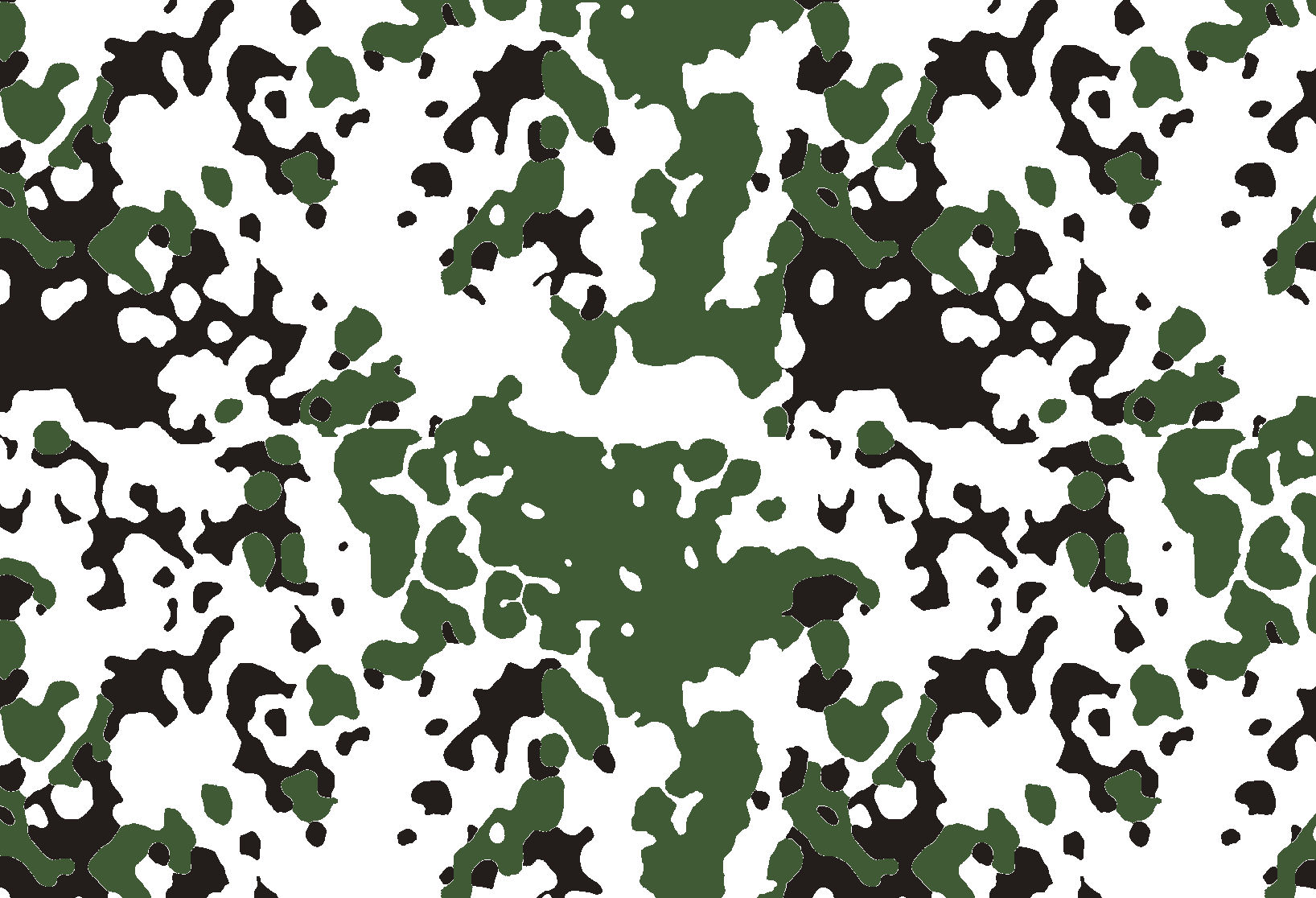
Snow

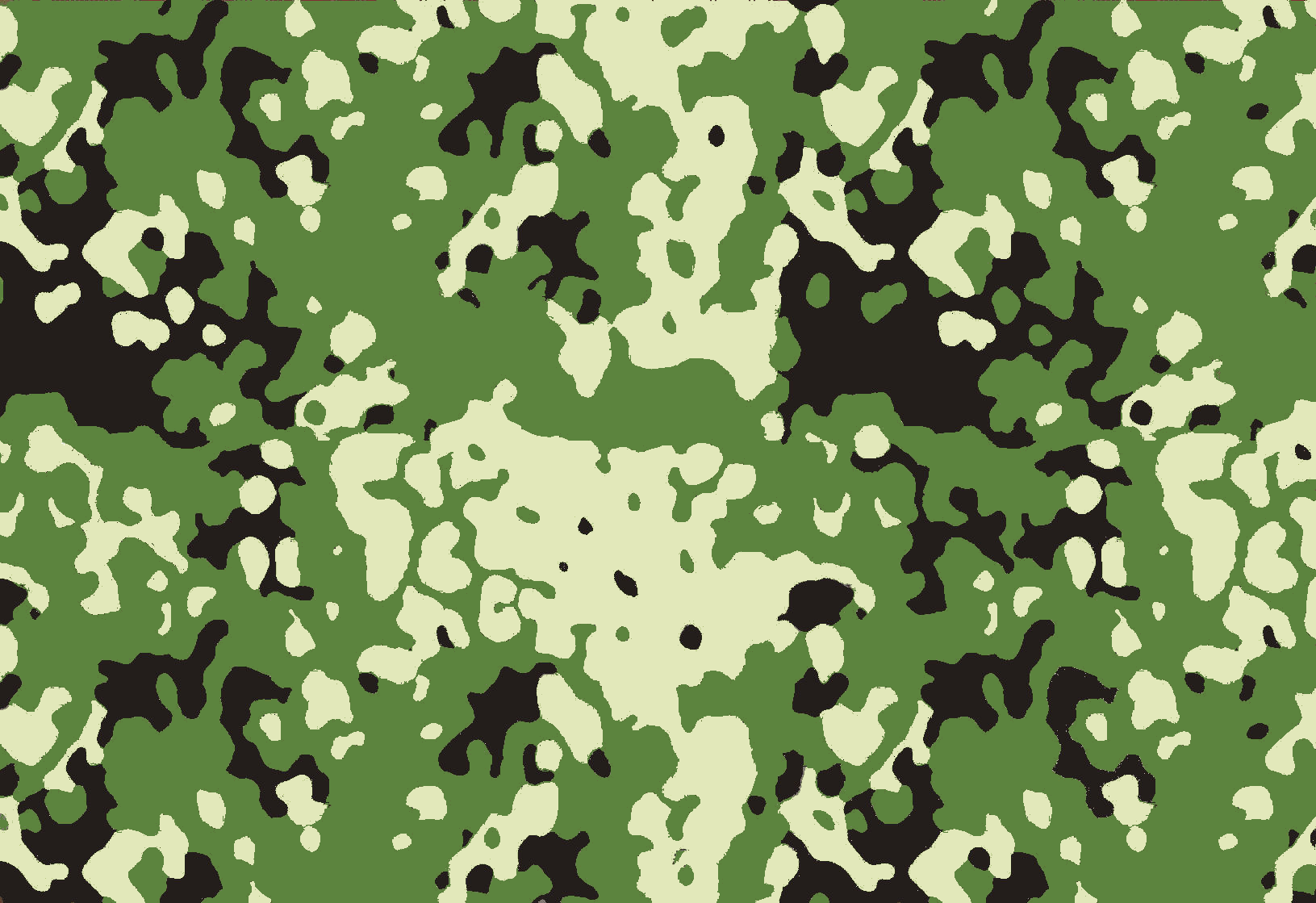
Russian version
Flectar-D
