= Bestune Pony =

Battery electric city car

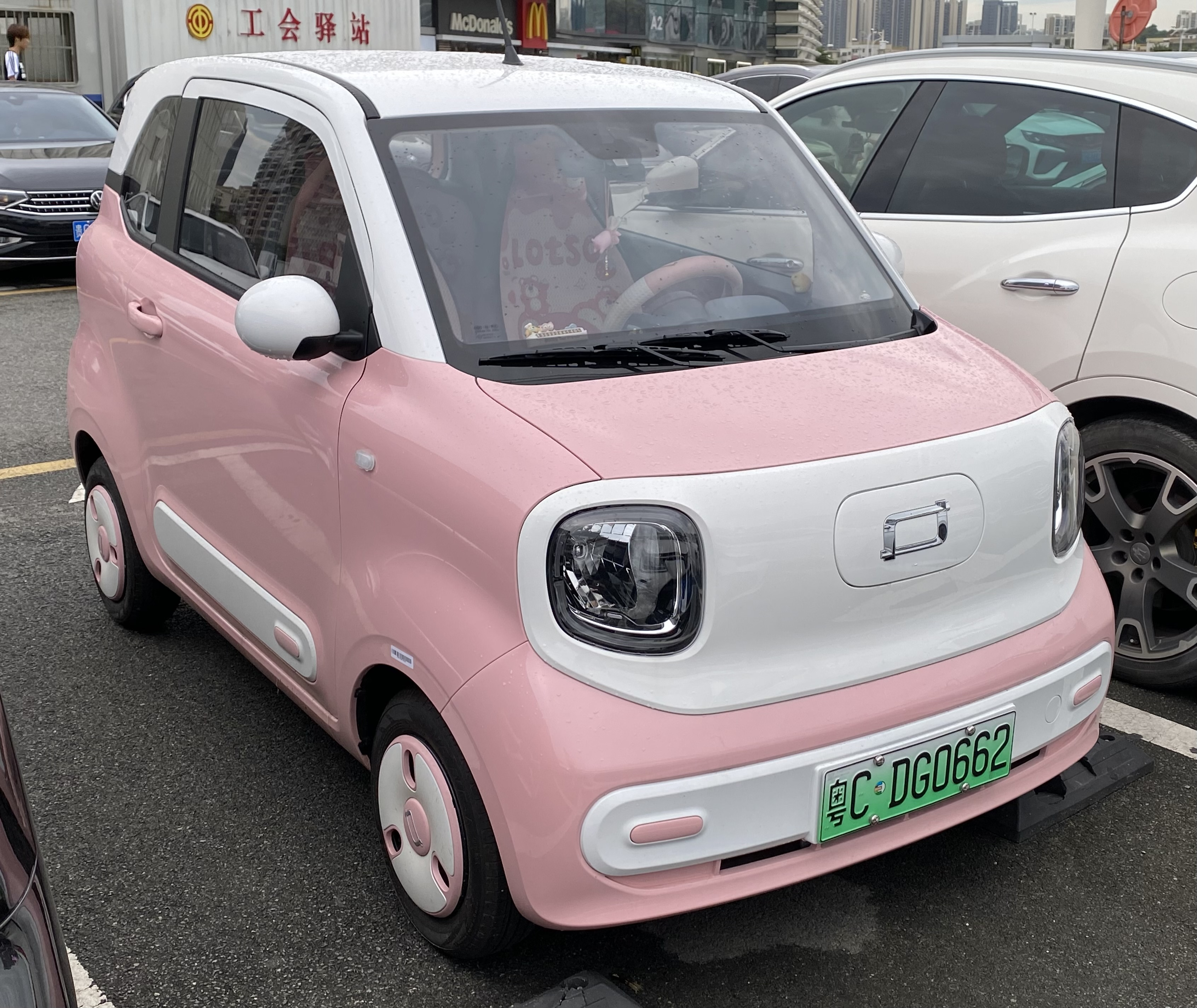

Overview
- Manufacturer: Bestune (FAW Group)
- Also called: Bestune Xiaoma; Desner Y300 (Italy); Yooudooo 1 (Spain)
- Production: May 2024 – present
- Assembly: China: Changchun

Body and chassis
- Class: City car (A)
- Body style: 3-door hatchback; 5-door hatchback
- Layout: Rear-wheel drive

Powertrain
- Electric motor: PMSM
- Power output: 27–40 hp (20–30 kW; 27–41 PS)
- Battery: 9.4 kWh LFP REPT; 10 kWh LFP; 13.9 kWh LFP REPT; 16.97 kWh LFP CATL; 18.11 kWh LFP CORNEX; 27.19 kWh LFP CATL
- Electric range: 122–328 km (76–204 mi) (CLTC)

Dimensions
- Wheelbase: 1,953 mm (76.9 in) (3-door); 2,215 mm (87.2 in) (5-door)
- Length: 3,000 mm (118.1 in) (3-door); 3,350 mm (131.9 in) (5-door)
- Width: 1,510 mm (59.4 in) (3-door); 1,540 mm (60.6 in) (5-door)
- Height: 1,630 mm (64.2 in) (3-door); 1,600 mm (63.0 in) (5-door)
- Curb weight: 685–715 kg (1,510–1,576 lb)

The Bestune Pony, also called the Bestune Xiaoma, is a battery electric city car produced by the FAW Group under the brand name Bestune.

== Overview ==
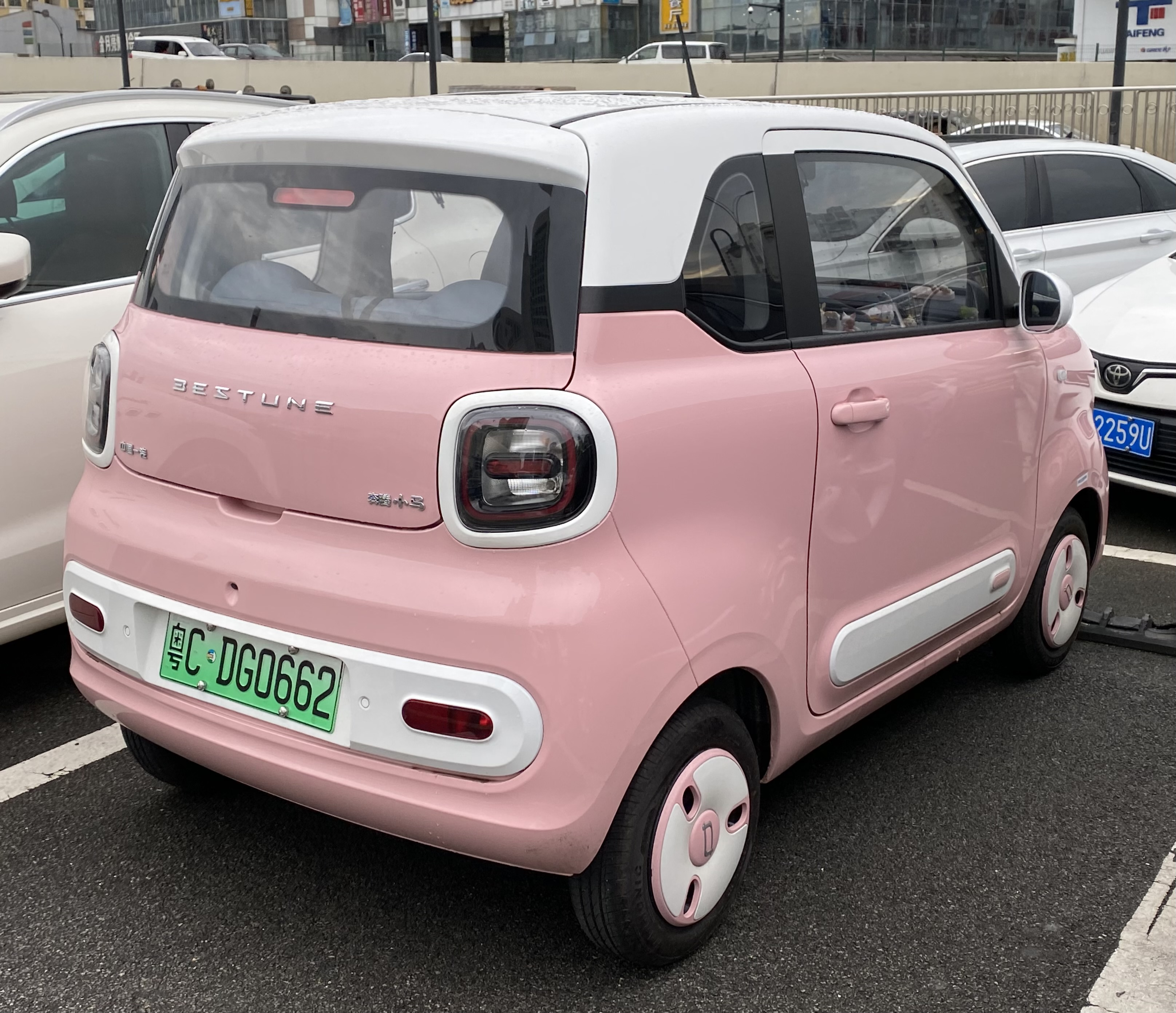
Rear view

In response to the great popularity of the Wuling Hongguang Mini EV electric microcar, the FAW Group prepared a response to this model under its Bestune brand. In April 2023, during the Shanghai Auto Show, the premiere of the pre-production Pony model family took place, which announced the serial model ready for sale by being covered with various stickers, decorations and additional panels. It officially debuted in September 2023 and went into production in May 2024.

The characteristic, boxy proportions were enriched by a two-tone exterior painting with large headlights and rear lamps, as well as additional oval-shaped strips on the bumpers and doors along with relatively small wheels. The car is also equipped with an extensive accessories package, such as a roof rack. The passenger cabin has a cool, minimalist design with a dashboard limited to a minimum of indicators and a two-spoke steering wheel. It has a rear cargo capacity of 81 litres (2.9 cu ft), expanding to 734 litres (25.9 cu ft) with the rear seats folded down.

The 5-door and 4-seater version was launched on 28 October 2026. It has a 350 mm (13.8 in) longer wheelbase and 262 mm (10.3 in) longer overall length. It has a larger rear cargo capacity of 265 litres (9.4 cu ft), expanding to 1,052 litres (37.2 cu ft) with the rear seats folded down.

== Specifications ==
The Bestune Pony is a fully electric car. It is powered by a 27 hp (20 kW; 27 PS) motor, and there are three LFP battery packs to choose from: 9.4 kWh, 10 kWh or 14 kWh. They allow for a range of approximately 122–170 kilometres (76–106 mi) on one charge according to the Chinese CLTC measurement cycle.

For 2025, the Pony was updated with a more powerful 40 hp (30 kW; 41 PS) motor with 90 N⋅m (66 lb⋅ft) of torque. It is available with a choice of two larger LFP-chemistry battery packs, a 17 kWh CATL-supplied pack capable of recharging from 30–80% in 30 minutes, and an 18 kWh pack supplied by Cornex (Chinese: 武汉楚能; pinyin: Wǔhàn chǔnéng) with optional DC fast charging 30–80% in 65 minutes; both provide a CLTC range rating of 222 kilometres (138 mi).

The 5-door version uses a similar motor and is available with either the same 17 kWh CATL battery pack, or a new larger 27.2 kWh CATL-supplied LFP pack providing of CLTC range and can recharge from 30–80% in 35 minutes at a peak rate of 27 kW.

Specifications
| Battery | | Motor | Power | Torque | Range | 30–80% charge | Top speed | Kerb weight |
| Type | Weight | Rear | Power | Torque | CLTC | 30–80% charge | Top speed | Kerb weight |
3-door
| 9.4 kWh LFP Rept Battero | 86 kg (190 lb) | 20kW TZ155X020 PMSM | 27 hp (20 kW; 27 PS) | 85 N⋅m (63 lb⋅ft) | 122 km (76 mi) | — | 100 km/h (62 mph) | 685 kg (1,510 lb) |
| 13.9 kWh LFP Rept Battero | 124 kg (273 lb) | 20kW TZ155X020 PMSM | 27 hp (20 kW; 27 PS) | 85 N⋅m (63 lb⋅ft) | 170 km (106 mi) | — | 100 km/h (62 mph) | 715 kg (1,576 lb) |
| 16.97 kWh LFP CATL | 135 kg (298 lb) | 30kW TZ155X030 PMSM | 40 hp (30 kW; 41 PS) | 90 N⋅m (66 lb⋅ft) | 222 km (138 mi) | 30 min | 100 km/h (62 mph) | 750 kg (1,653 lb) |
| 18.11 kWh LFP Cornex | 141 kg (311 lb) | 30kW TZ155X030 PMSM | 40 hp (30 kW; 41 PS) | 90 N⋅m (66 lb⋅ft) | 222 km (138 mi) | 65 min | 100 km/h (62 mph) | 750 kg (1,653 lb) |
5-door
| 16.97 kWh LFP CATL | 135 kg (298 lb) | 30 kW TZ155XZ030 PMSM | 40 hp (30 kW; 41 PS) | 92 N⋅m (68 lb⋅ft) | 222 km (138 mi) | 30 min | 103 km/h (64 mph) | 805 kg (1,775 lb) |
| 27.19 kWh LFP CATL | 208 kg (459 lb) | 30 kW TZ155XZ030 PMSM | 40 hp (30 kW; 41 PS) | 92 N⋅m (68 lb⋅ft) | 328 km (204 mi) | 35 min | 103 km/h (64 mph) | 885 kg (1,951 lb) |

== Desner Y300 ==
In Italy, it is imported since 2025 and renamed as the Desner Y300, and it is homologated as a heavy quadricycle (L7e). It features a 13.9 kWh battery with a range of 170 km (CLTC cycle). Its top speed is 90 km/h. It is sold in Italy in two versions: the 2-seater Cargo and the 4-seater Family.

== Sales ==
| Year | China |
|---|---|
| 2024 | 55,309 |
| 2025 | 104,984 |
