= Bestune T55 =

Subcompact crossover sport utility vehicle

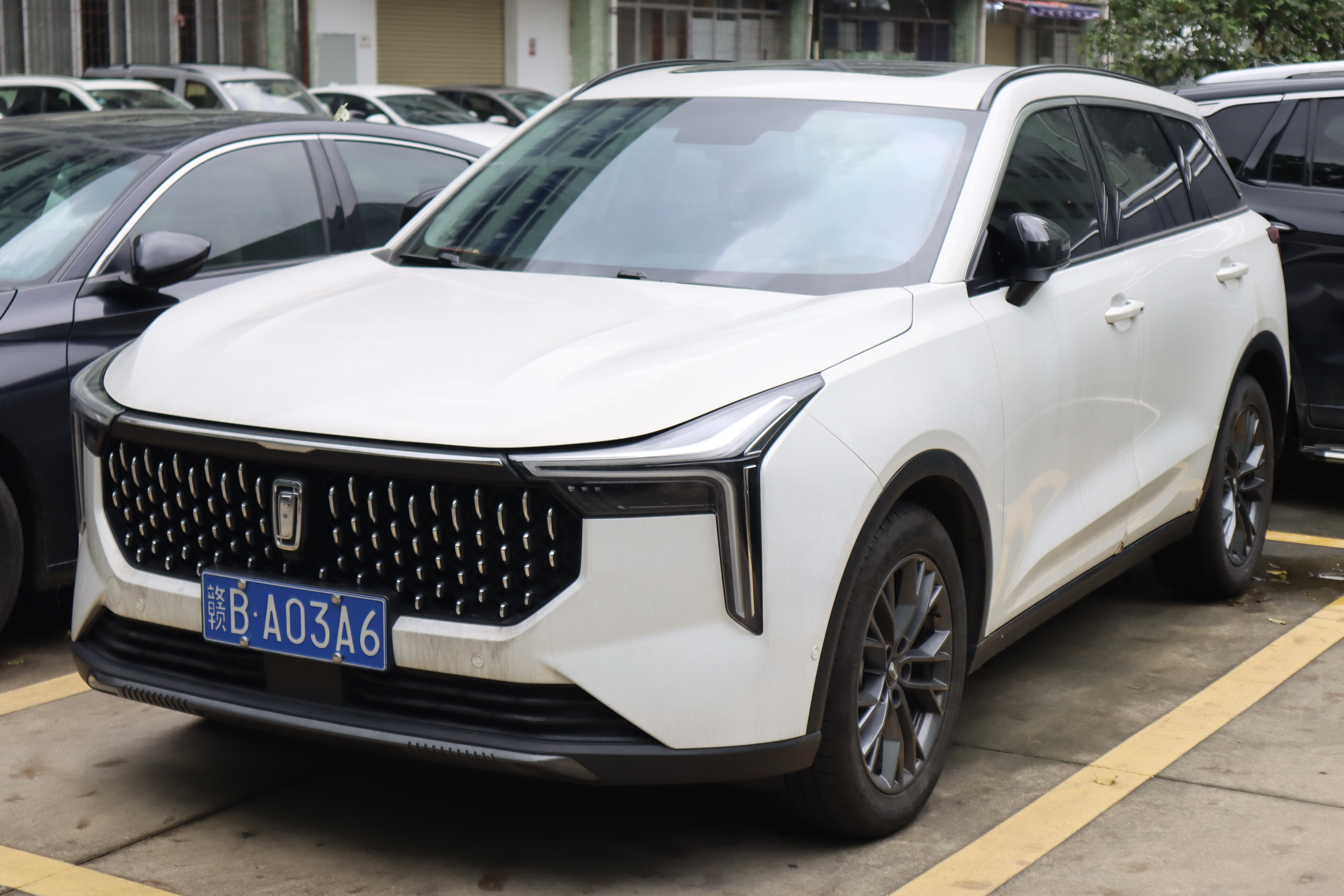

Overview
- Manufacturer: Bestune (FAW Group)
- Production: 2021–2025 (China); 2022–present (export)
- Assembly: China: Changchun

Body and chassis
- Class: Subcompact crossover SUV (B)
- Body style: 5-door SUV
- Layout: Front engine, Front-wheel drive

Powertrain
- Engine: 1.5 turbo

Dimensions
- Wheelbase: 2,650 mm (104.3 in)
- Length: 4,437 mm (174.7 in)
- Width: 1,850 mm (72.8 in)
- Height: 1,625 mm (64.0 in)
- Curb weight: 1,485 kg (3,274 lb)

The Bestune T55 (Chinese: 奔腾T55) is a subcompact crossover SUV produced by the FAW Group under the brand name Bestune. It was available in China starting from 2021.

== Overview ==
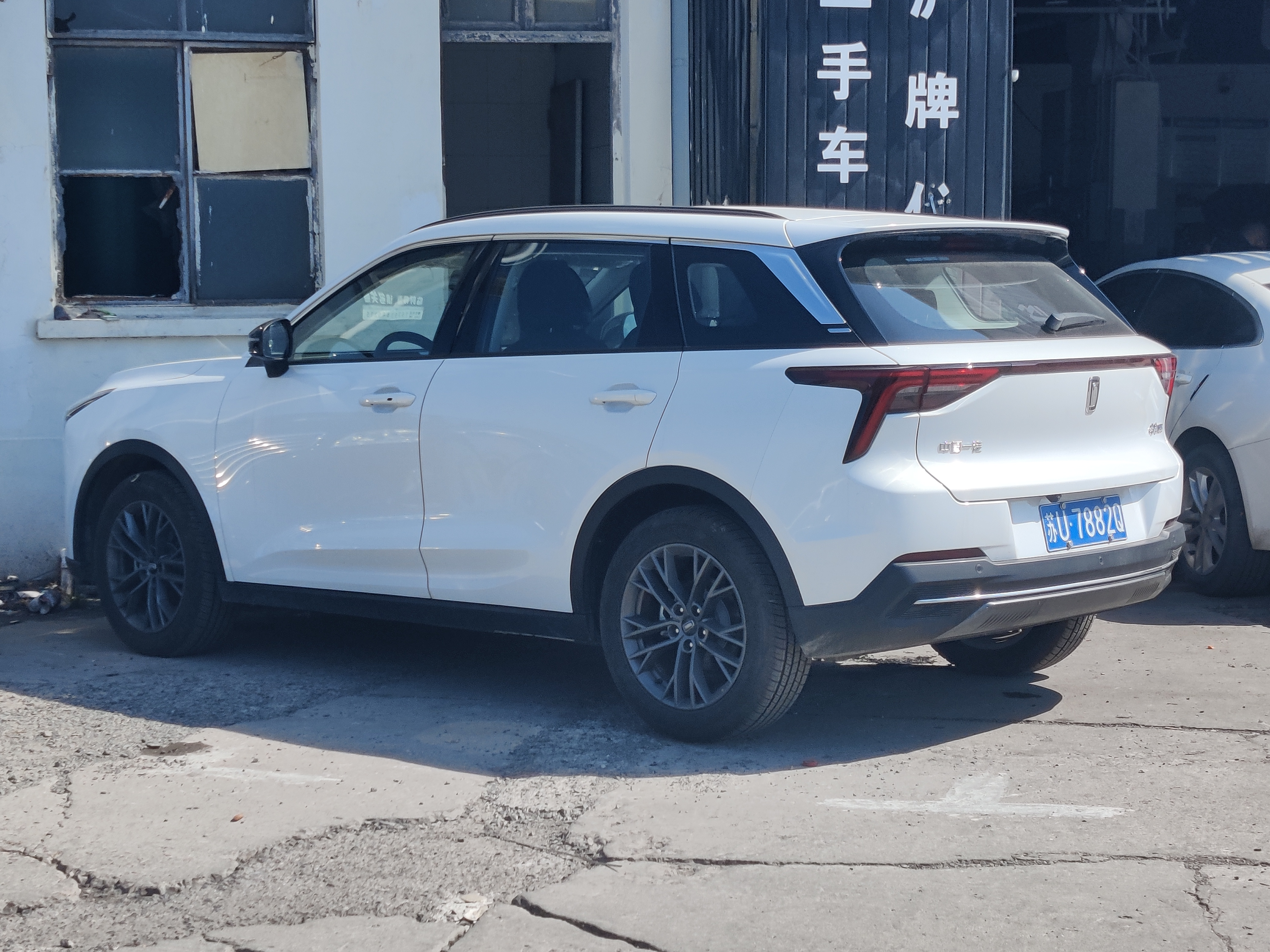
Rear view

The T55 is powered by a 1.5-litre turbo engine and has 170 horsepower (127 kW; 172 PS) and 258 N⋅m (190 lb⋅ft; 26 kg⋅m). Additionally, it comes in Regular and Sports versions. It comes with a DCT transmission.

The vehicle has dimensions of 4437 mm/1850 mm/1625 mm, and a wheelbase of 2650 mm. Wheel sizes start at 457.2 mm (18 inches).

== Sales ==
Below is the sales data for the Bestune T55 in China.

Bestune T55 Sales in China
| Year | Vehicles Sold |
|---|---|
| 2021 | 8,099 |
| 2022 | 4,959 |
