= Bestune Yueyi 08 =

Mid-size sedan

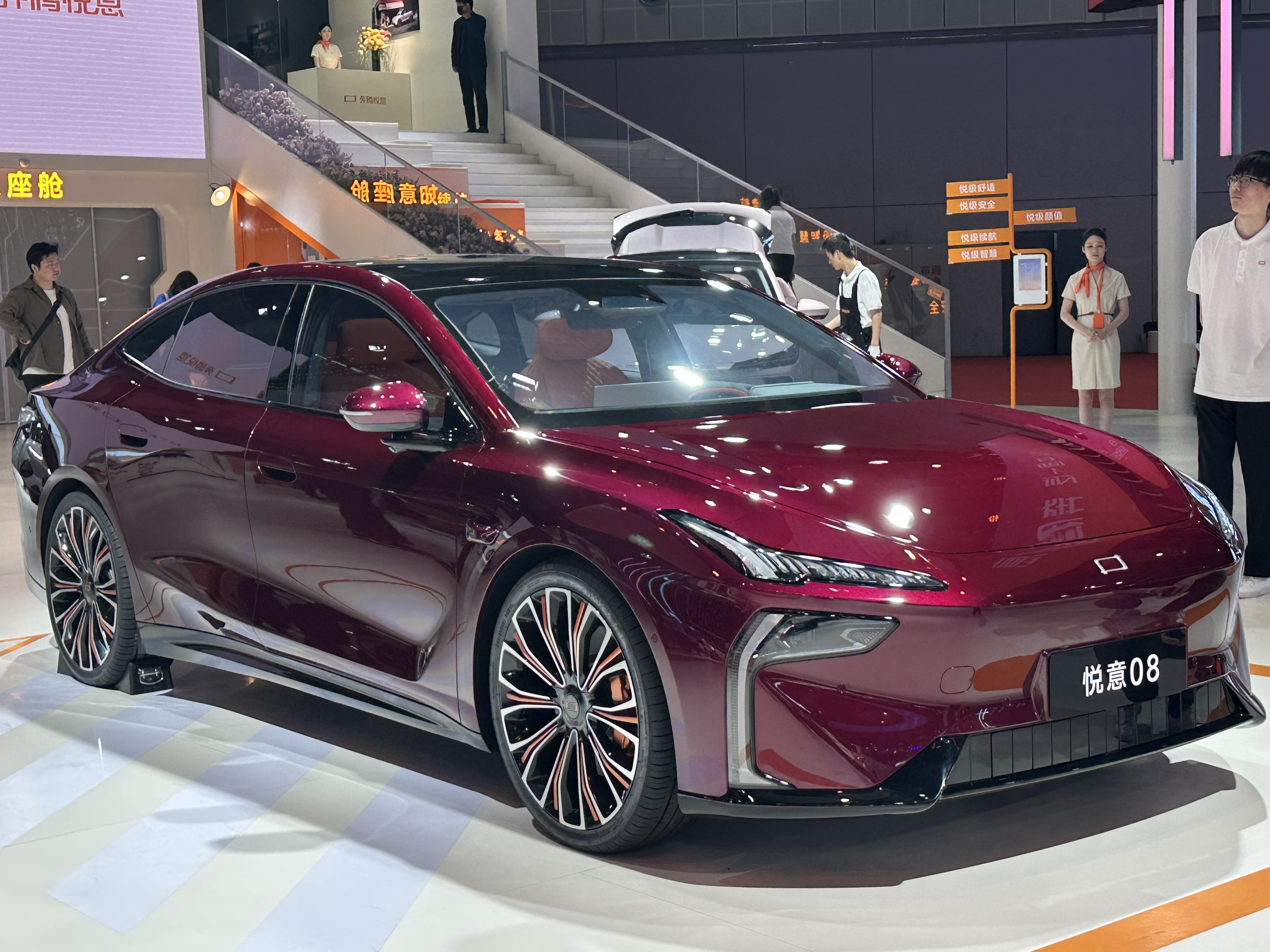

Overview
- Manufacturer: Bestune (FAW Group)
- Model code: E541
- Production: May 2026 – present
- Assembly: China: Changchun

Body and chassis
- Class: Mid-size car (D)
- Body style: 4-door sedan

Dimensions
- Wheelbase: 2,900 mm (114.2 in)
- Length: 4,920 mm (193.7 in)
- Width: 1,920 mm (75.6 in)
- Height: 1,475 mm (58.1 in)

The Bestune Yueyi 08 (Chinese: 一汽悦意08) is a battery electric and range extender mid-size sedan produced by the FAW Group under the brand name Bestune.

== Overview ==
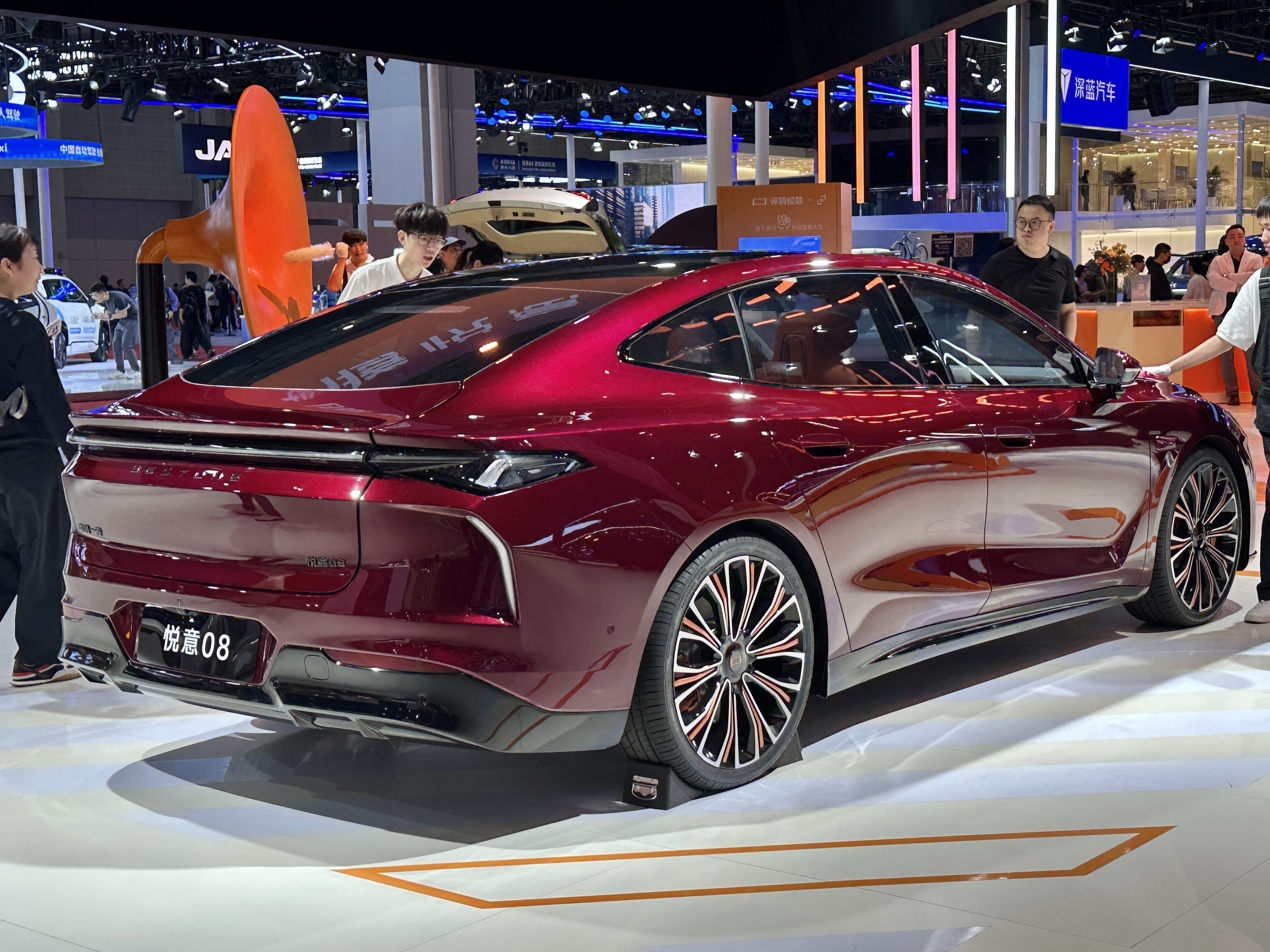
Rear view

In April 2025, at the Shanghai Auto Show, the third model from the electrified Yueyi line was presented, which was the Yueyi 08 mid-size sedan. The car featured a more futuristic and aggressive styling compared to previous Bestune products, gaining slim body lines with a pointed front end adorned with double-row lighting and a gently sloping roofline.

The passenger compartment features a digitally minimalist design, centered around a wide, high-set center tunnel and an oval steering wheel. Ahead of the driver is a high-mounted, raised digital instrument display, while another touchscreen dominates the center console.

== Specifications ==
The Yueyi 08 became a fully electric car, the specifications of which were not disclosed at the time of its premiere.
