= Bestune B70S =

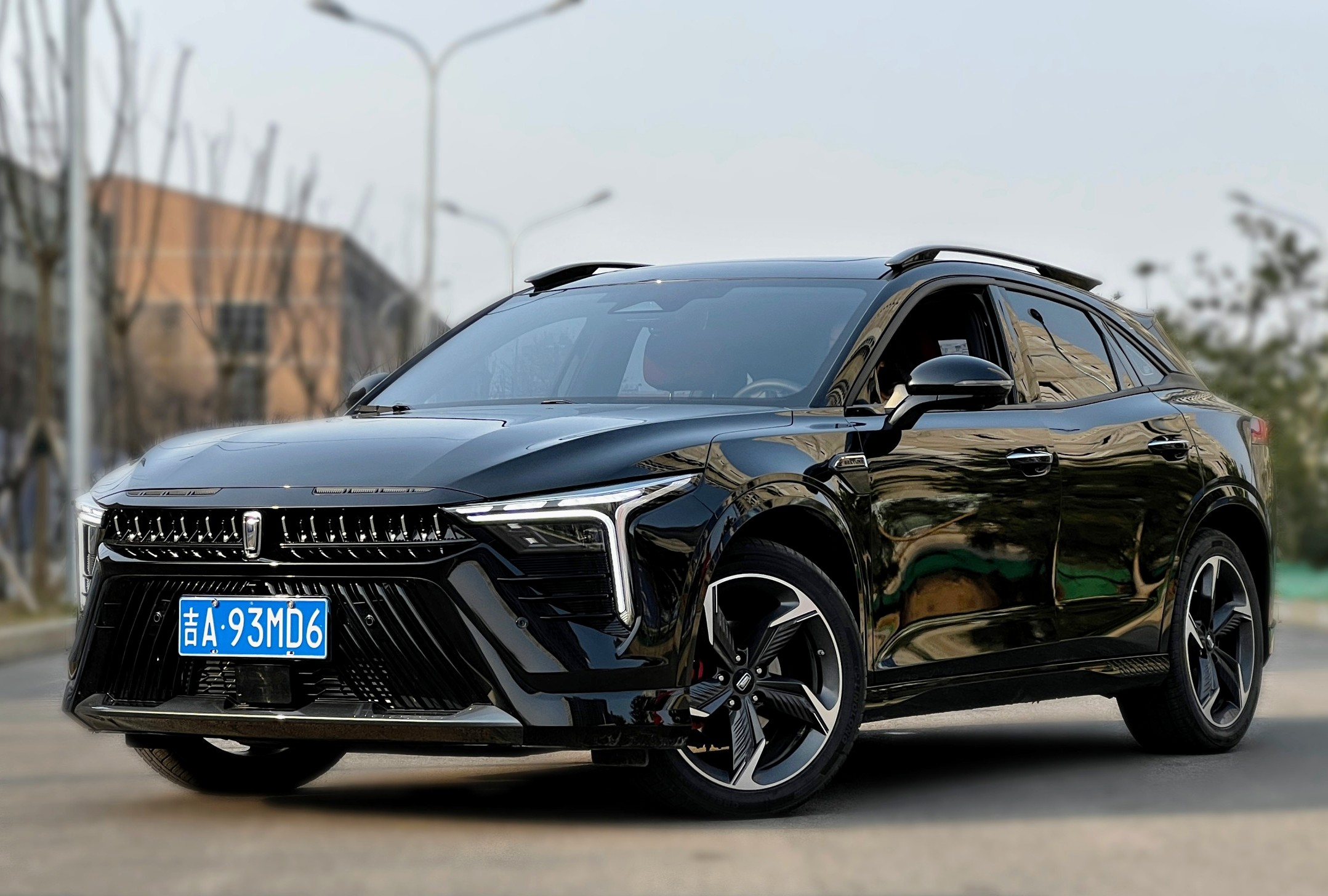

Overview
- Manufacturer: Bestune (FAW Group)
- Production: 2022–2025
- Assembly: China: Changchun

Body and chassis
- Class: Compact crossover SUV
- Body style: 5-door SUV
- Layout: FF layout

Powertrain
- Engine: 1.5 L I4 (turbo petrol); 2.0 L I4 (turbo petrol)
- Transmission: 7-speed DCT; 6-speed automatic

Dimensions
- Wheelbase: 2,750 mm (108.3 in)
- Length: 4,555 mm (179.3 in)
- Width: 1,845 mm (72.6 in)
- Height: 1,515 mm (59.6 in)
- Curb weight: 1,925–1,960 kg (4,244–4,321 lb)

The Bestune B70S is a compact crossover SUV produced by the FAW Group under the brand name Bestune.

== Overview ==
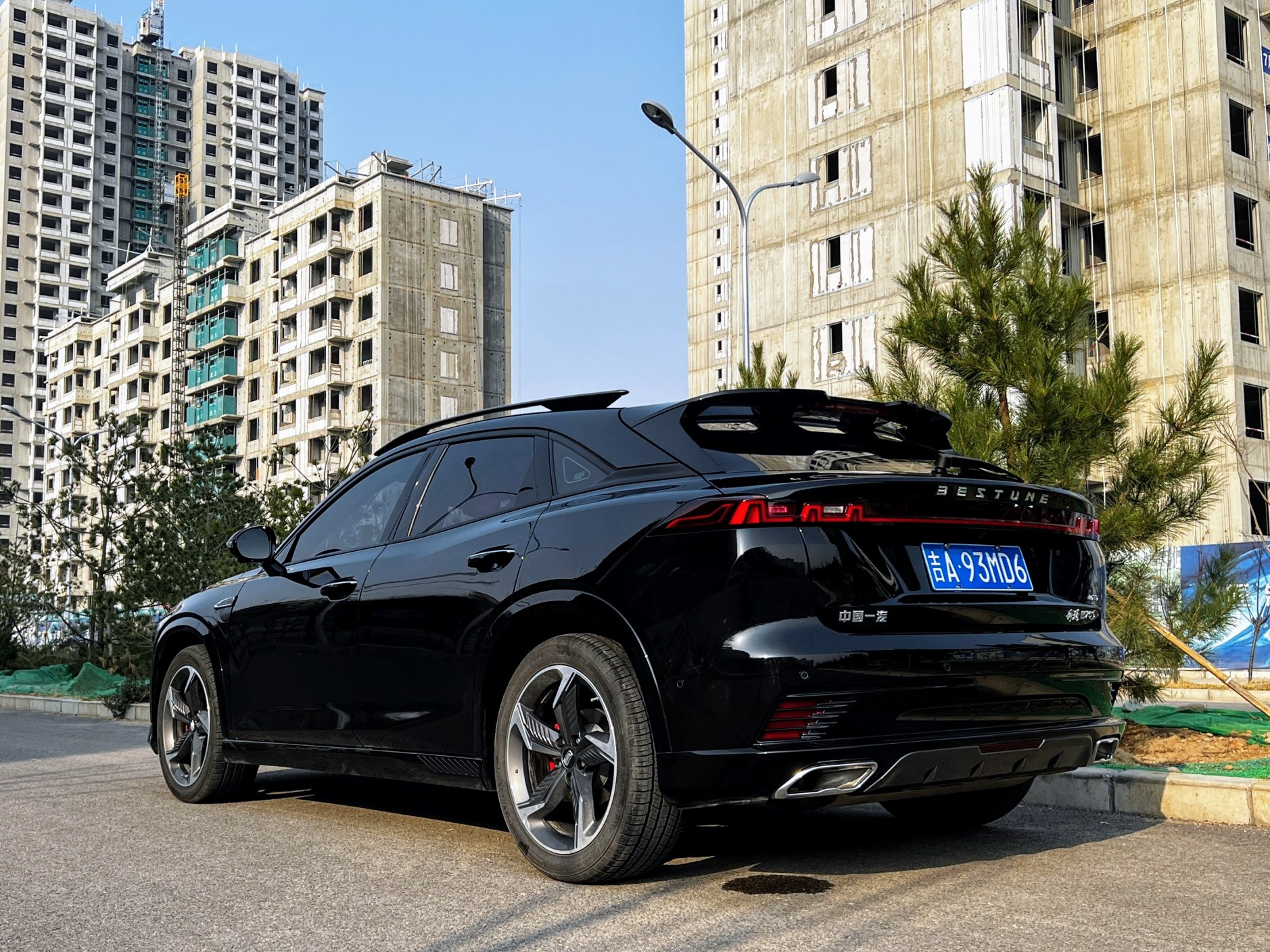
Rear view

The Bestune B70S was revealed during the 2021 Guangzhou Auto Show and was launched in China right after in the first quarter of 2022 with prices ranging from 109,900 to 142,900 yuan (16,350 – US$21,260).

The interior of the B70S features a 12.3-inch digital instrument cluster, a 12.3-inch infotainment touchscreen, and another 7-inch touchscreen for the climate controls. The seats come standard with leather and Alcantara upholstery, and the 3D holographic virtual assistant first offered on the Bestune T77 is also equipped on the B70S.

== Specifications ==
The Bestune B70S is available as a five-seater vehicle, and is powered by a 170 hp 1.5-litre turbo engine mated to a 7-speed DCT and a 224 hp 2.0-litre turbo engine mated to a 6-speed automated manual gearbox. Both variants are offered in front-wheel drive only.
