= Bestune =

Chinese automobile brand

FAW Bestune Automobile Co., Ltd.
- Native name: 一汽奔腾汽车股份有限公司
- Formerly: Besturn (2006–2018)
- Type: Subsidiary
- Industry: Automotive
- Founded: 2006; 20 years ago
- Headquarters: Changchun, China
- Area served: Worldwide
- Products: Automobiles
- Parent: FAW Group (79.0394%); Jiangsu Yueda Automotive Group (10.3358%); Agricultural Bank of China (6.0443%); China Telecom (3.0222%); Nanjing Horizon (0.6044%)
- Website: https://benteng.faw.cn/(in Chinese)

FAW Bestune Automobile Co., Ltd., commonly referred to as Bestune (Chinese: 一汽奔腾; pinyin: Yīqì Bēnténg), formerly known as Besturn, is an automotive marque owned by the Chinese automaker FAW Group.

Bestune currently produces budget passenger vehicles for the FAW Group.

== History ==
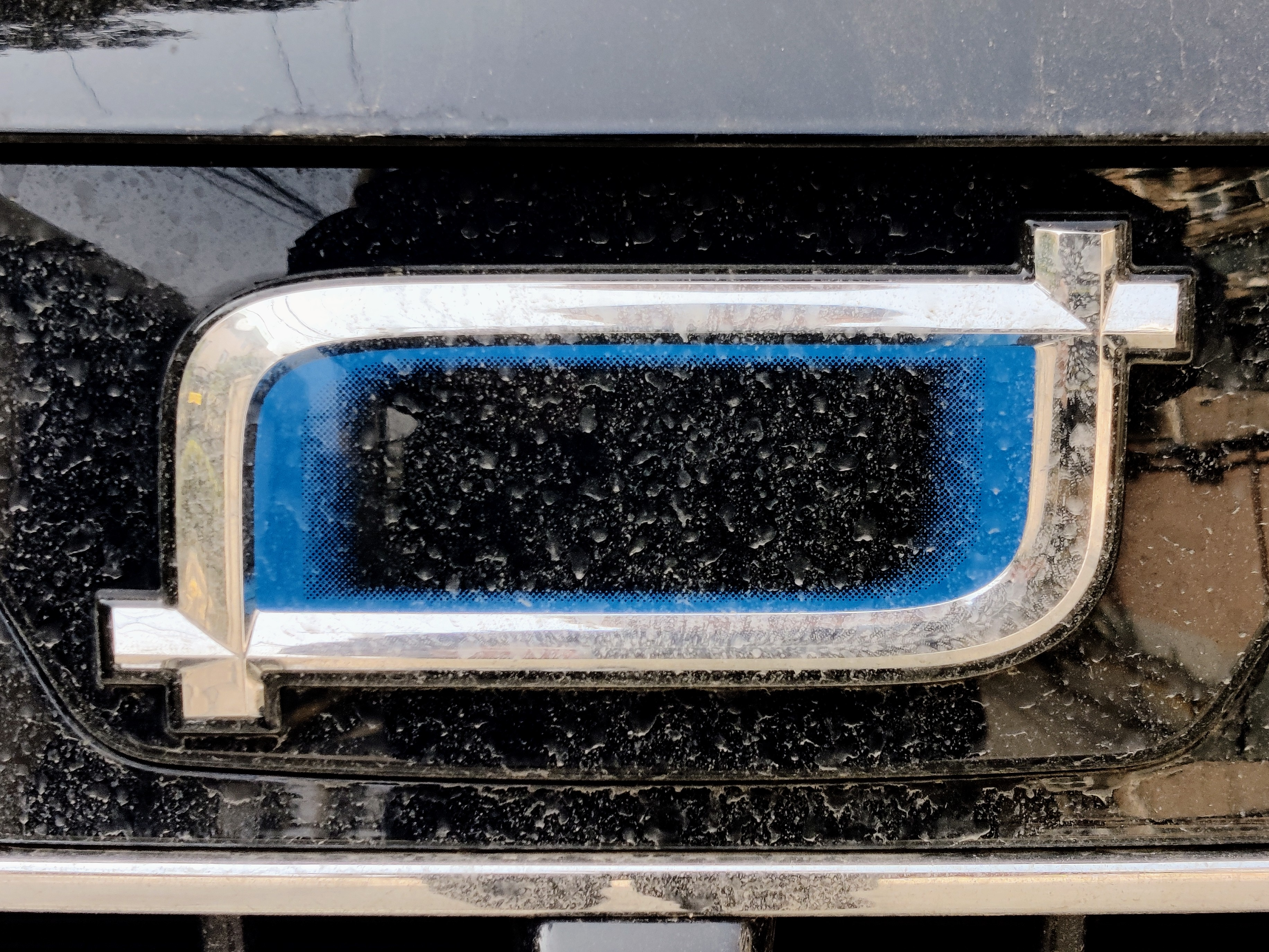
Bestune current badge from the Bestune T99 facelift in 2021

In 2006, the Besturn B70, which was developed and based on the Mazda 6, made its debut as the first model with the Besturn name.

The second model of the brand, the Besturn B50, made its debut in 2009.

In 2012, Bestune began to sell its vehicles in the Russian market with the B50 as the first model sold, debuting at the 2012 Moscow International Automobile Salon. It was reported to have a joint venture with Avtotor to manufacture the Besturn X80 in Russia in 2015. The Besturn X80 entered manufacture in Russia in April 2017, and FAW announced that it would sell at least two to three more models by 2018.

At the end of 2018, the manufacturer decided to rename Besturn's English name to Bestune. The Chinese name Benteng remained unchanged.

In December 2020, FAW Group announced the restructure of FAW Bestune and FAW Jiefang. Bestune was transferred from FAW Car to FAW Corporation Limited (FAW Group) and will operate independently as a wholly owned subsidiary of FAW Group. FAW Jiefang was set as listed in the capital market.

On 15 December 2022, Bestune announced the reveal of a new brand logo.

In December 2022, the FAW Group announced the transfer of 17.02% FAW Jiefang share to Bestune, providing financial support to Bestune.

=== Investment of Yueda Group and introduction of Yueyi ===
In September 2023, Bestune announced the completion of its capital increase project, the registered capital increased from CNY 6.0 billion to CNY 8.4 billion. Yueda Automotive Group, a subsidiary of state-owned Yueda Group, became the first external investor introduced to Bestune. FAW Corporation Limited (FAW Group), FAW Equity Investment, and Yueda Automotive Group hold stakes of 86.16%, 11.87%, and 1.97%, respectively.

Bestune logos history

In September 2025, FAW Group, Yueda Automotive, Agricultural Bank of China, China Telecom, and Nanjing Horizon Information Technology jointly increased their capital investment in Bestune, raising a total of 8.55 billion yuan. Following the capital increase, the equity structure of Bestune changed. The combined shareholding of FAW and FAW Equity Investment in Bestune decreased from 86.1568% to 79.0394%. Yueda Automotive's shareholding increased from 1.9741% to 10.3358%, making it the second-largest shareholder. Nanjing Horizon, Agricultural Bank of China, and China Telecom hold 0.6044%, 6.0443%, and 3.0222% respectively.

In June 2026, at the Yueyi 08 launch event, FAW Group announced that FAW Yueyi has been upgraded to an independent new energy brand.

== Products ==
=== Current ===
- B70 (2006–present), mid-size sedan
- NAT (E05) (2021–present), MPV, BEV
- Pony (2023–present), city car, BEV
- T90 (2023–present), mid-size SUV
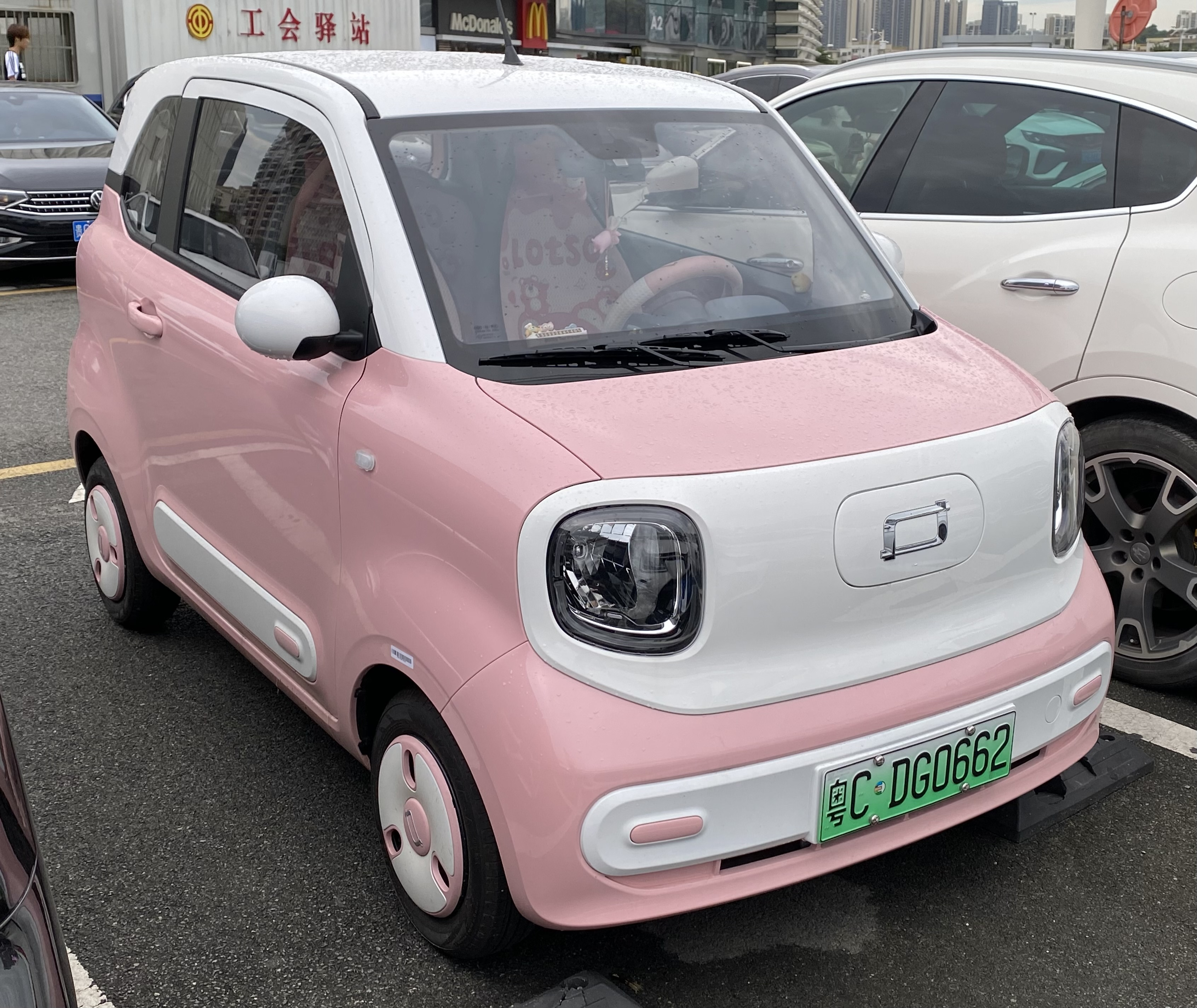
Bestune Pony

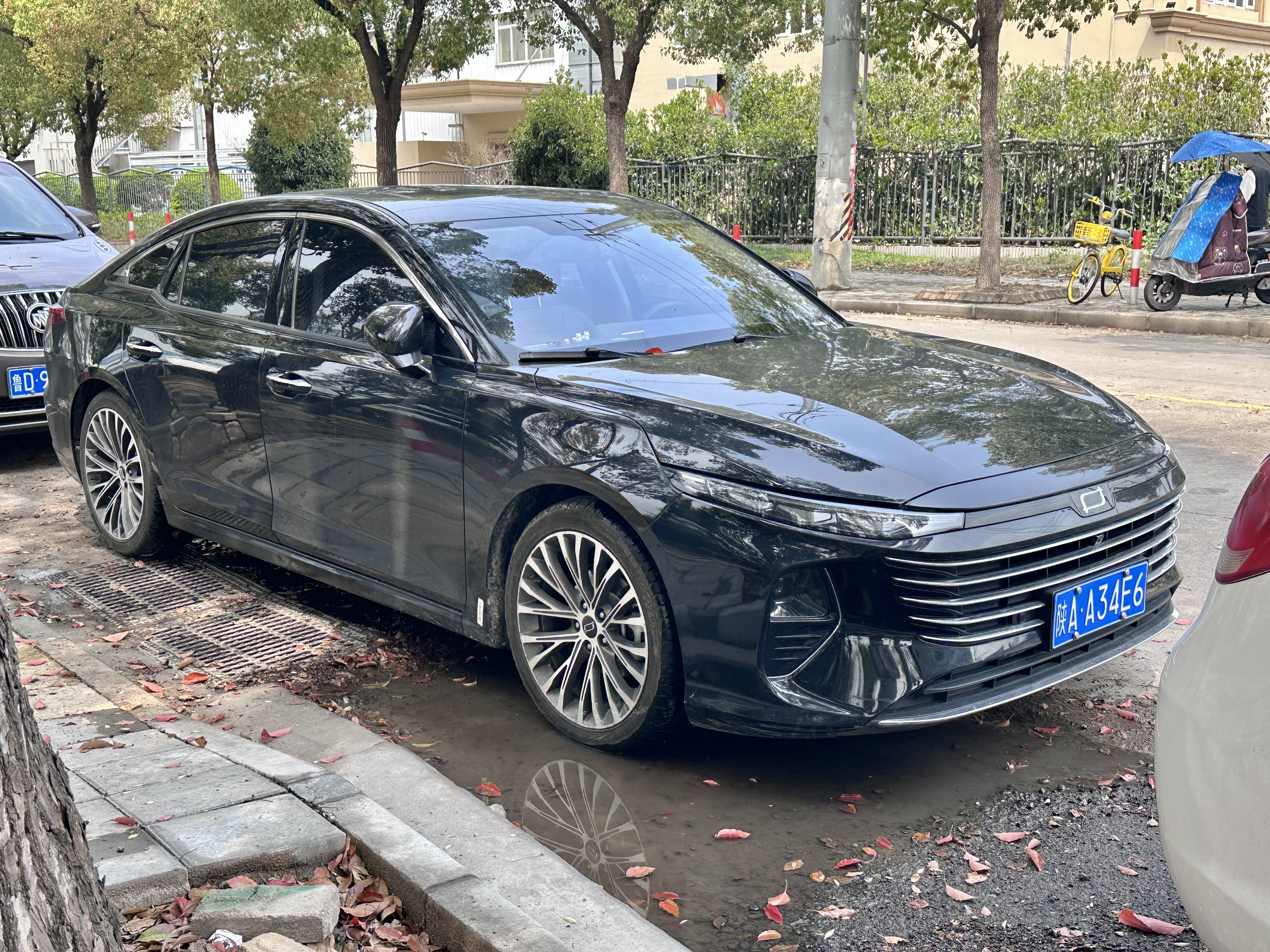
Bestune B70

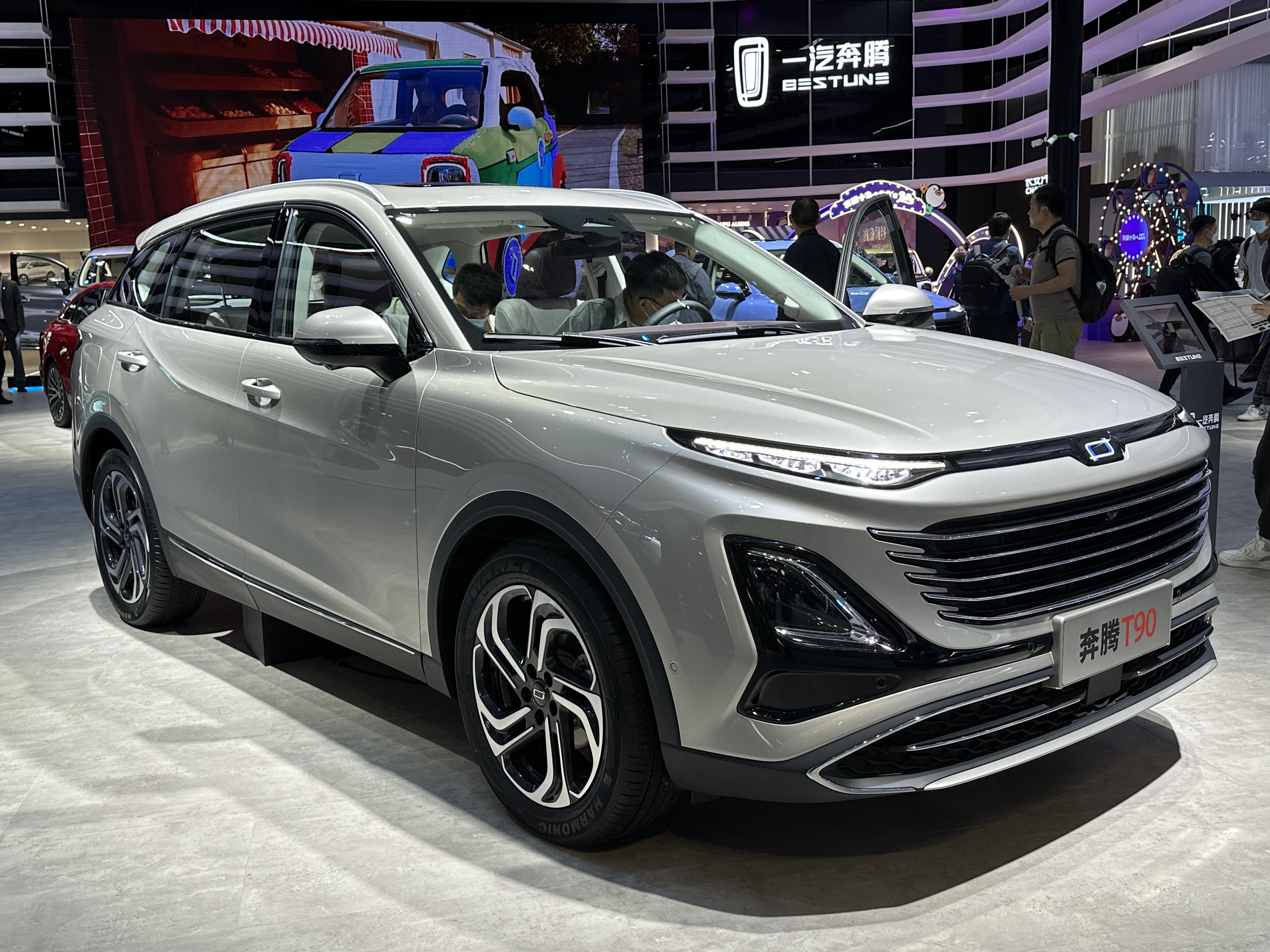
Bestune T90

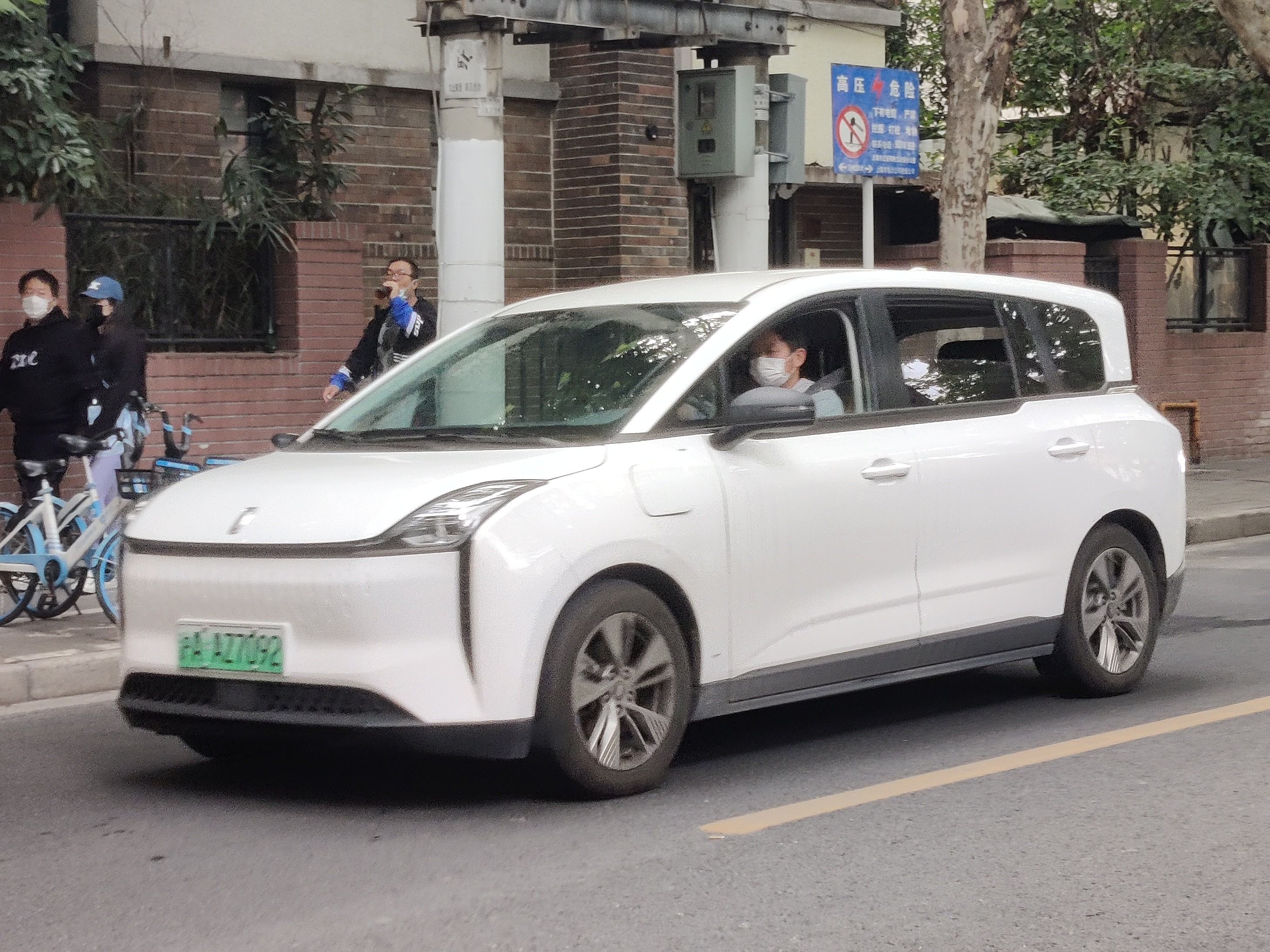
Bestune NAT

==== Yueyi series ====
- Yueyi 03 (2025–present), compact SUV, BEV
- Yueyi 07 (2025–present), mid-size SUV, PHEV
- Yueyi 08 (2026–present), mid-size sedan, BEV/EREV
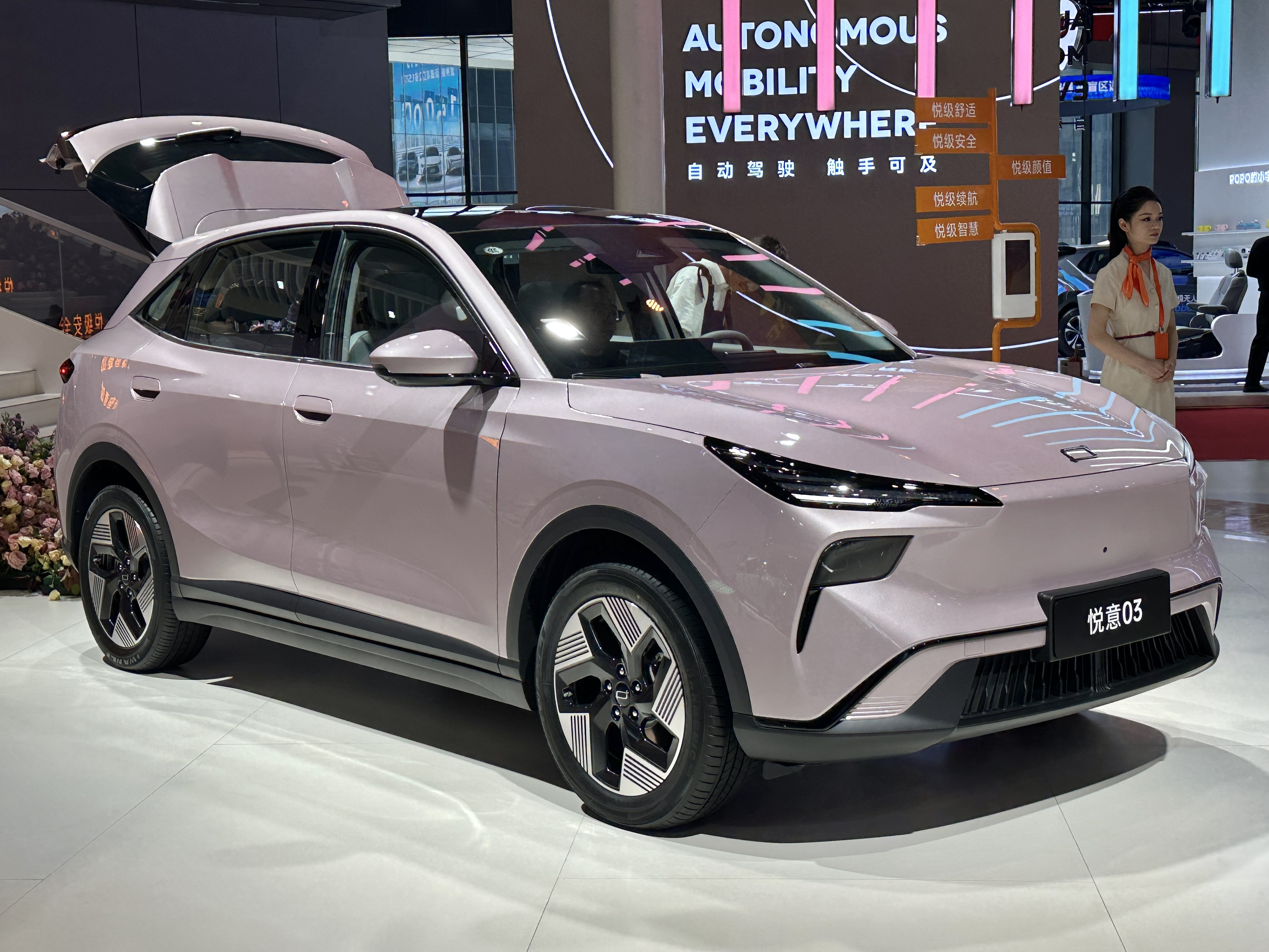
Bestune Yueyi 03

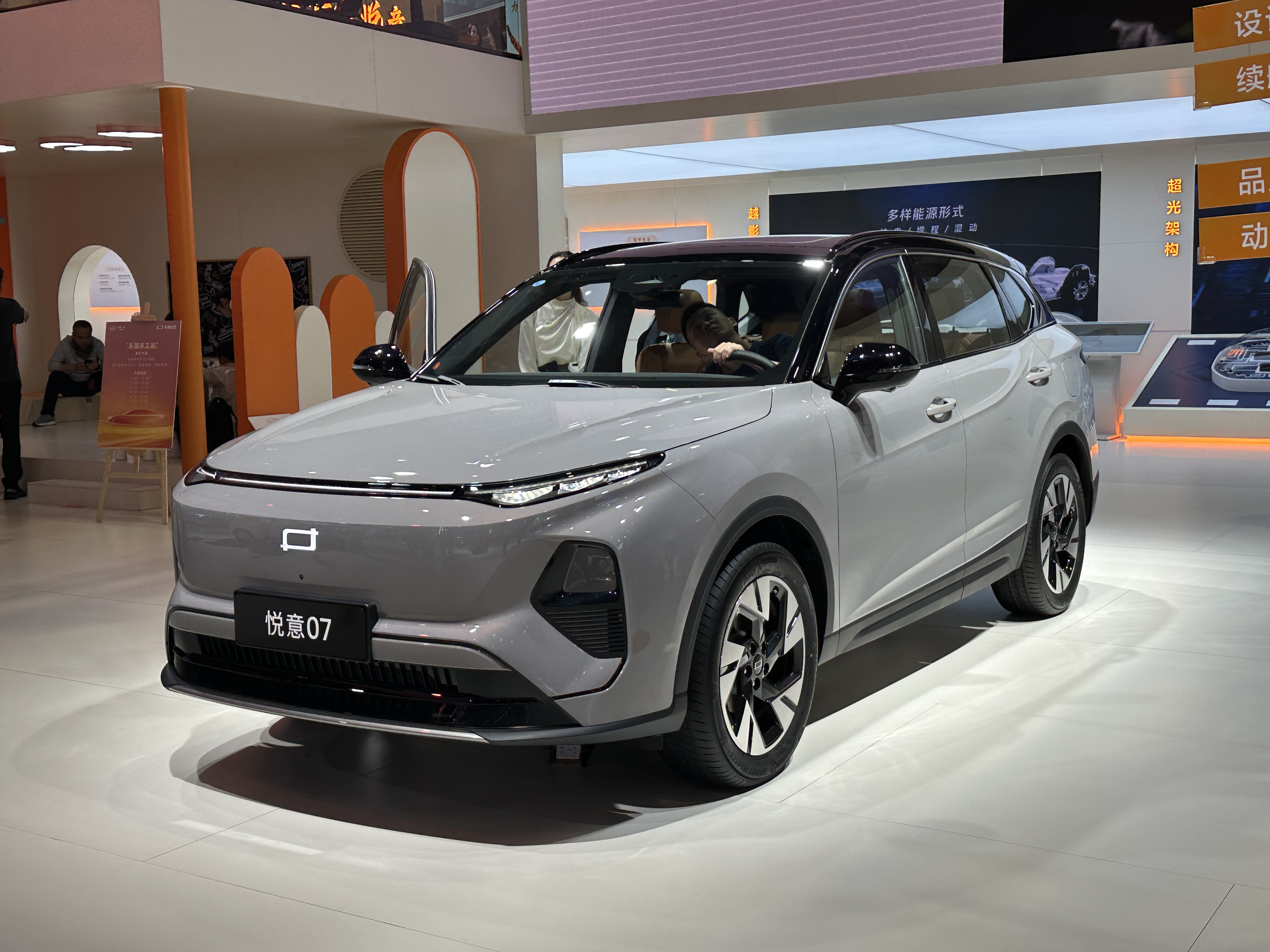
Bestune Yueyi 07

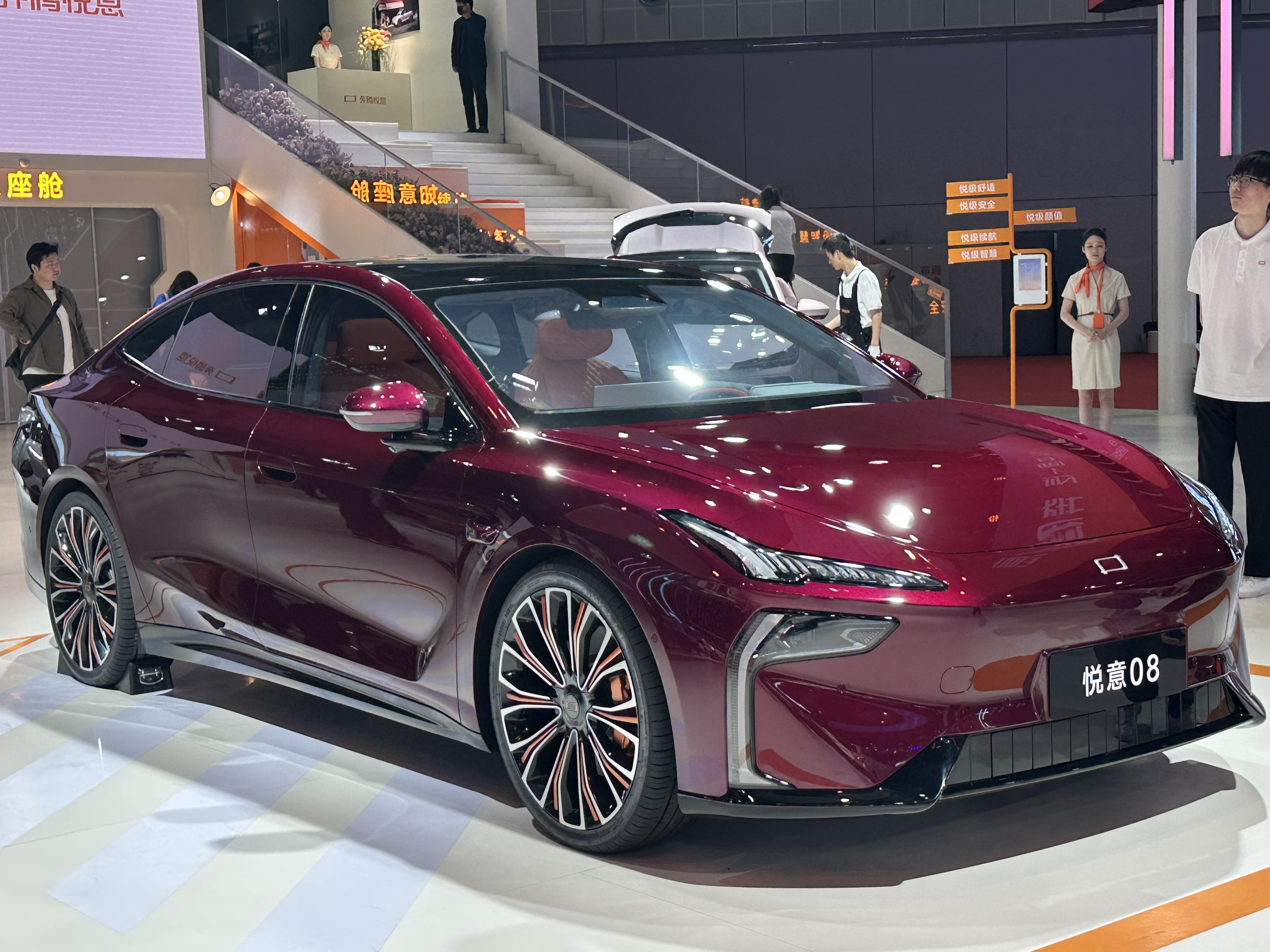
Bestune Yueyi 08

=== Discontinued ===
- Bestune M9 (2023–2025), MPV
- Bestune B50 (2009–2019), compact sedan
- Bestune B70S (2022–2025), compact SUV
- Bestune B90 (2012–2017), mid-size sedan
- Bestune B30 (2015–2020), compact sedan
- Bestune X80 (2013–2020), compact SUV
- Bestune X40 (2016–2019), subcompact SUV
- Bestune T99 (2019–2025), mid-size SUV
- Bestune T77 (2018–2025), compact SUV
- Bestune T55 (2021–2025), compact SUV
- Bestune T33 (2019–2022), subcompact SUV
- Bestune E01 (2020–2025), compact SUV, BEV
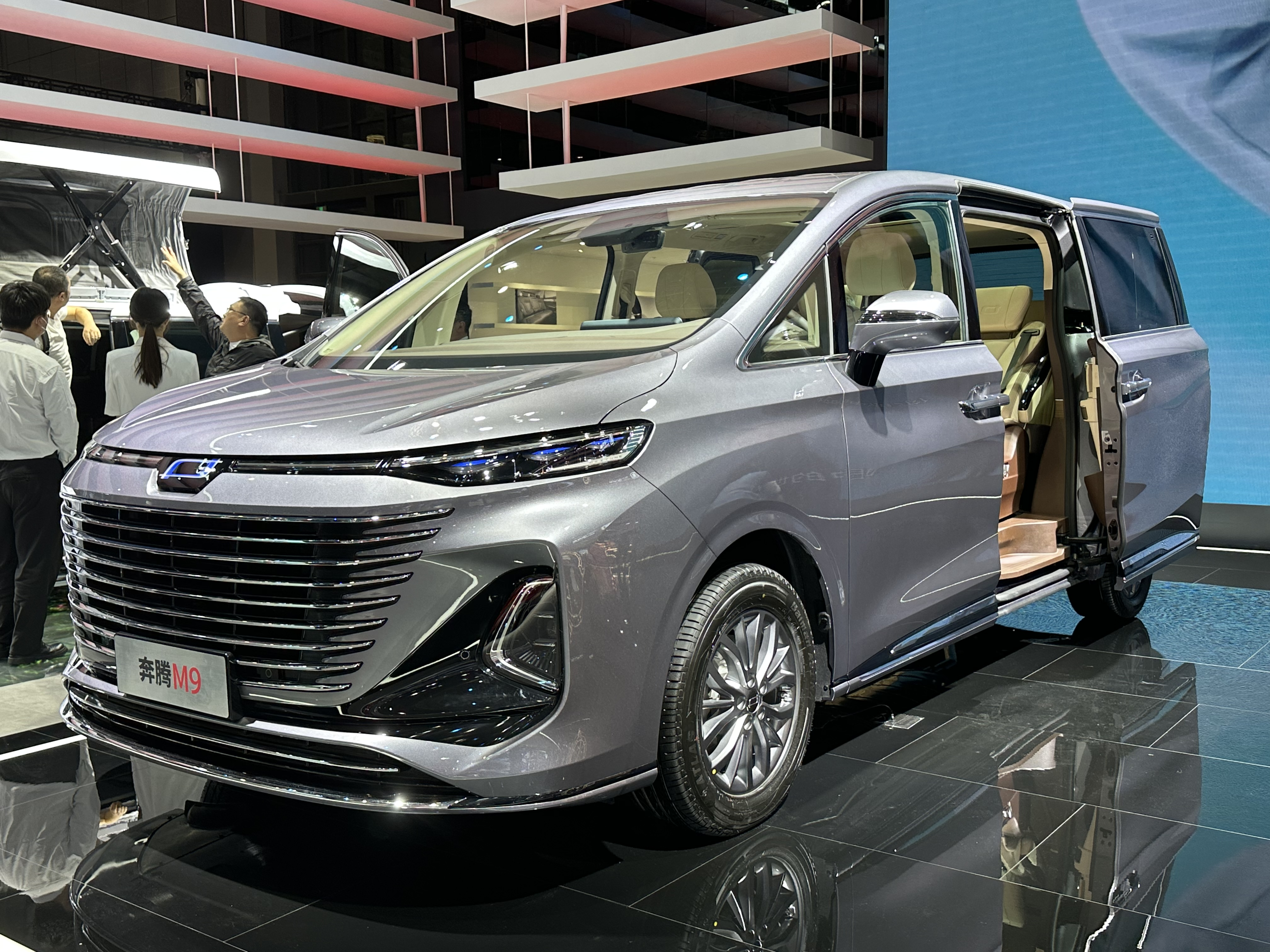
Bestune M9

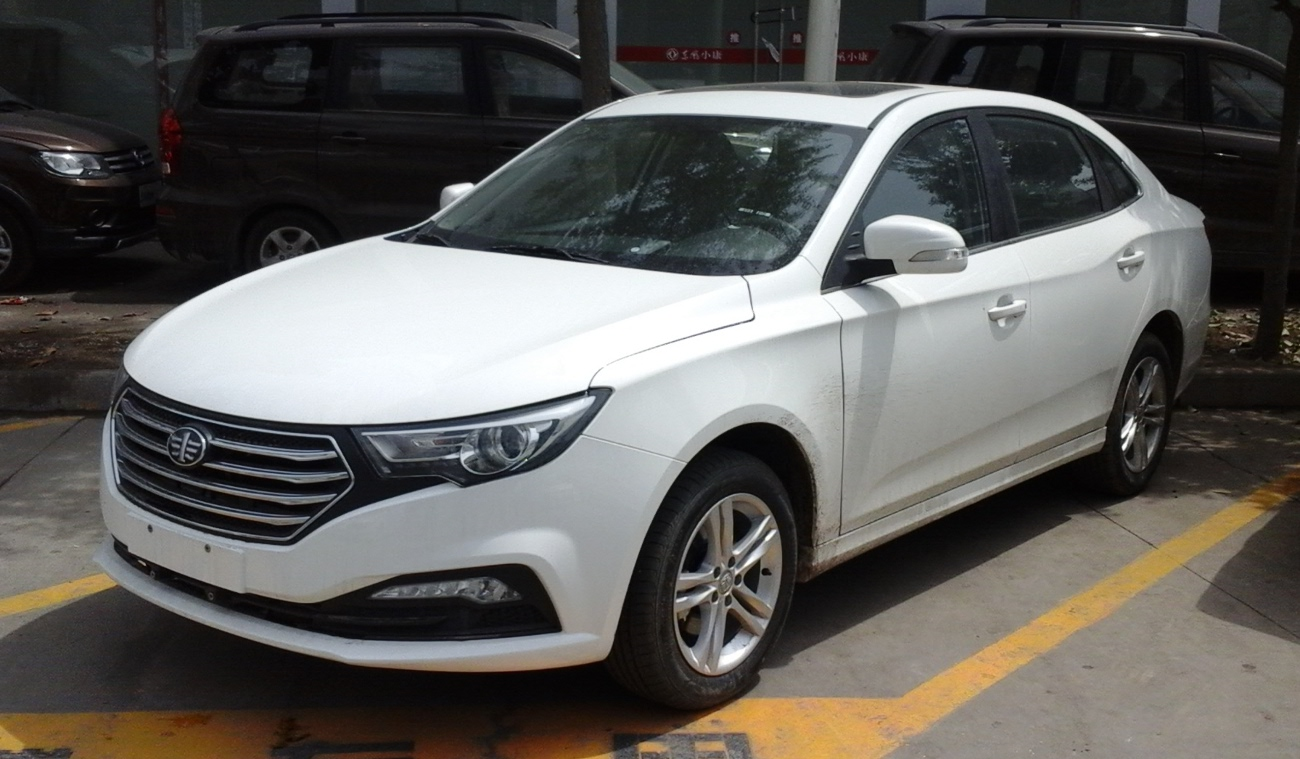
Bestune B30

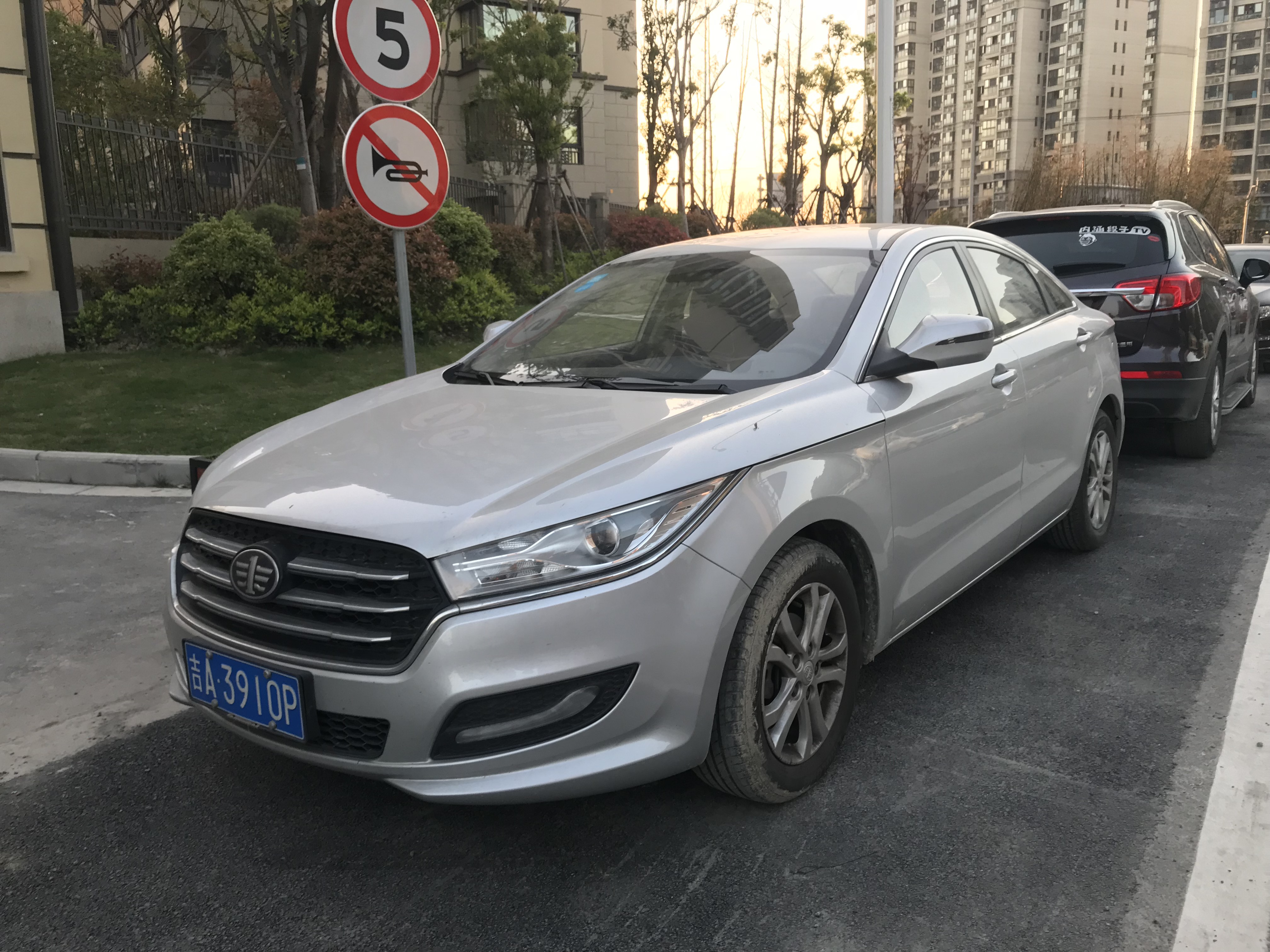
Bestune B50

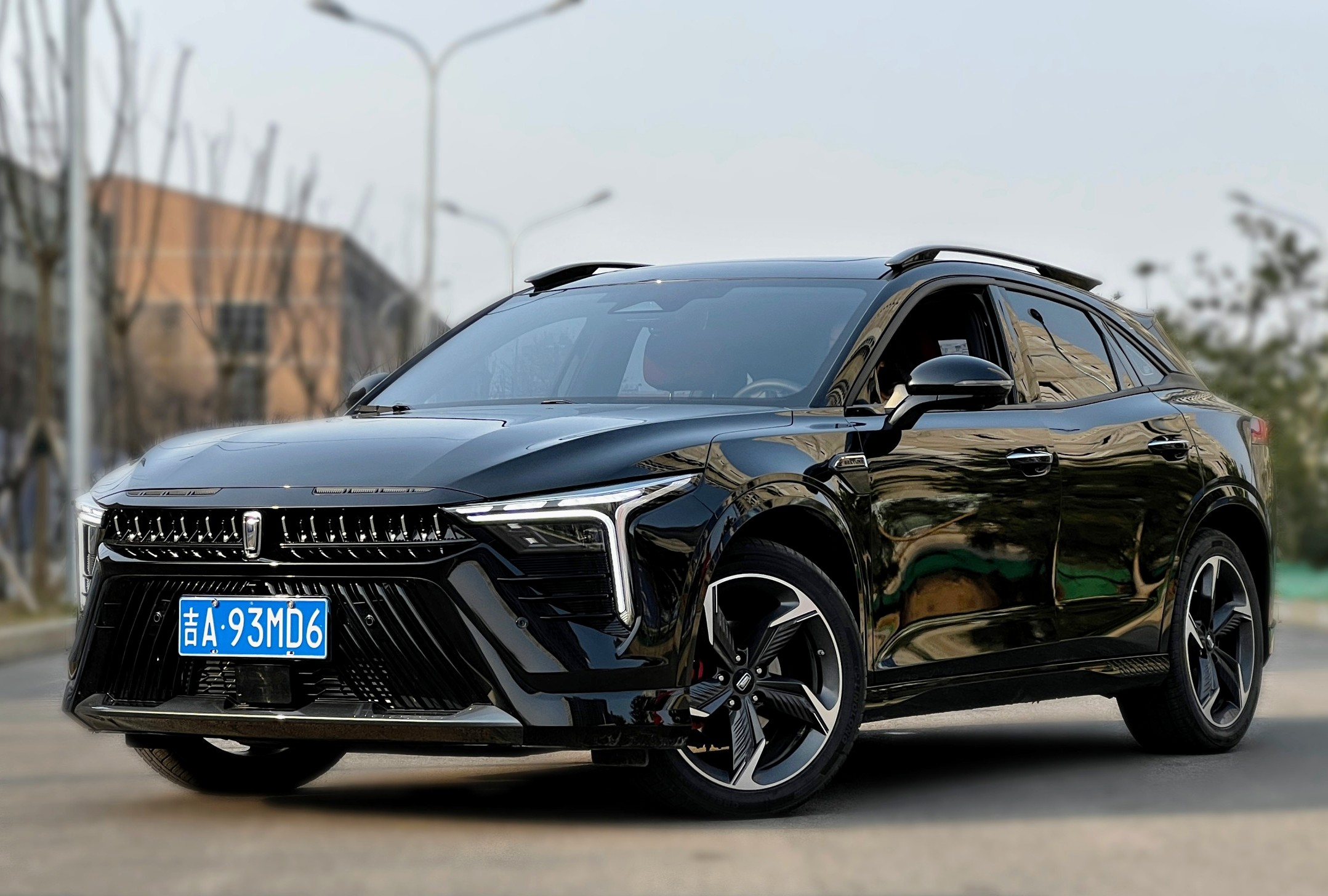
Bestune B70S

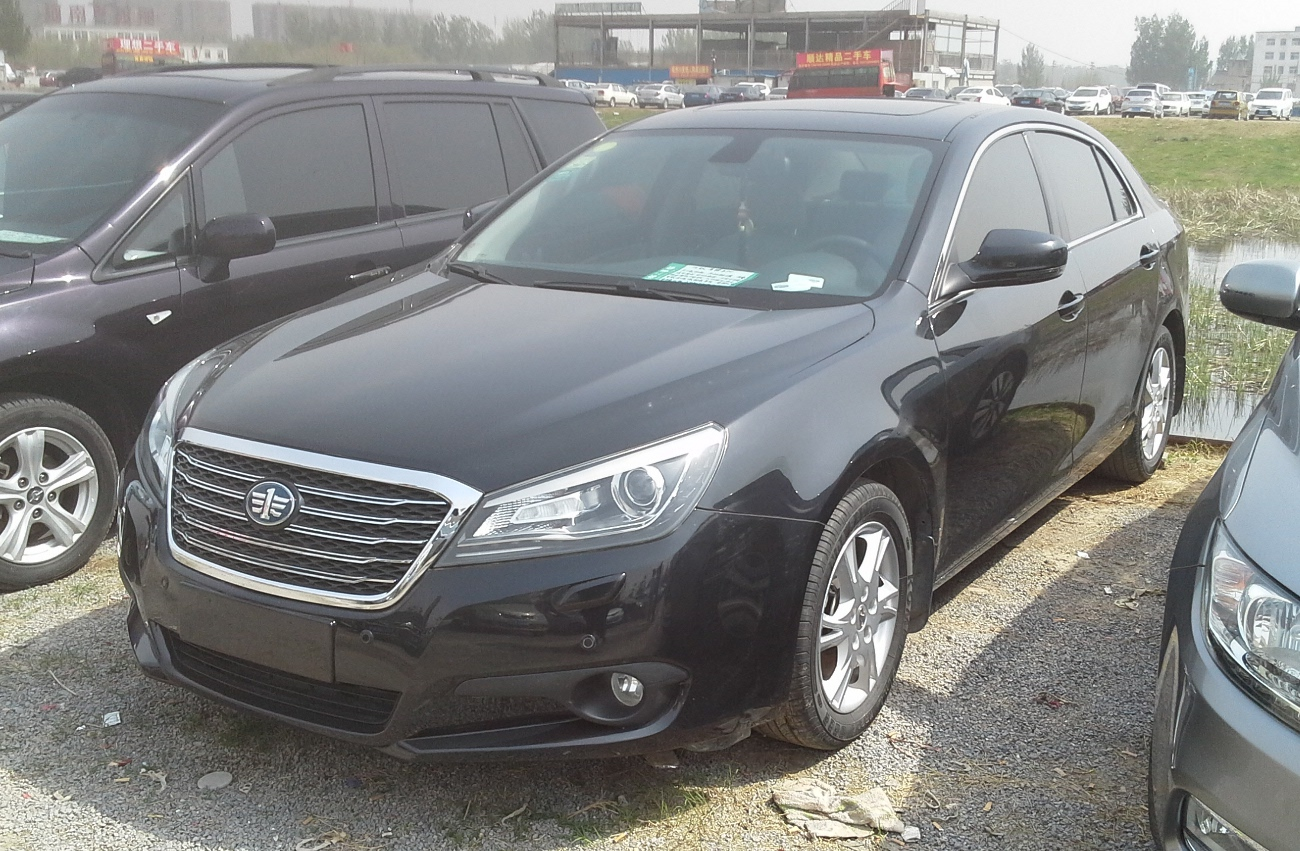
Bestune B90

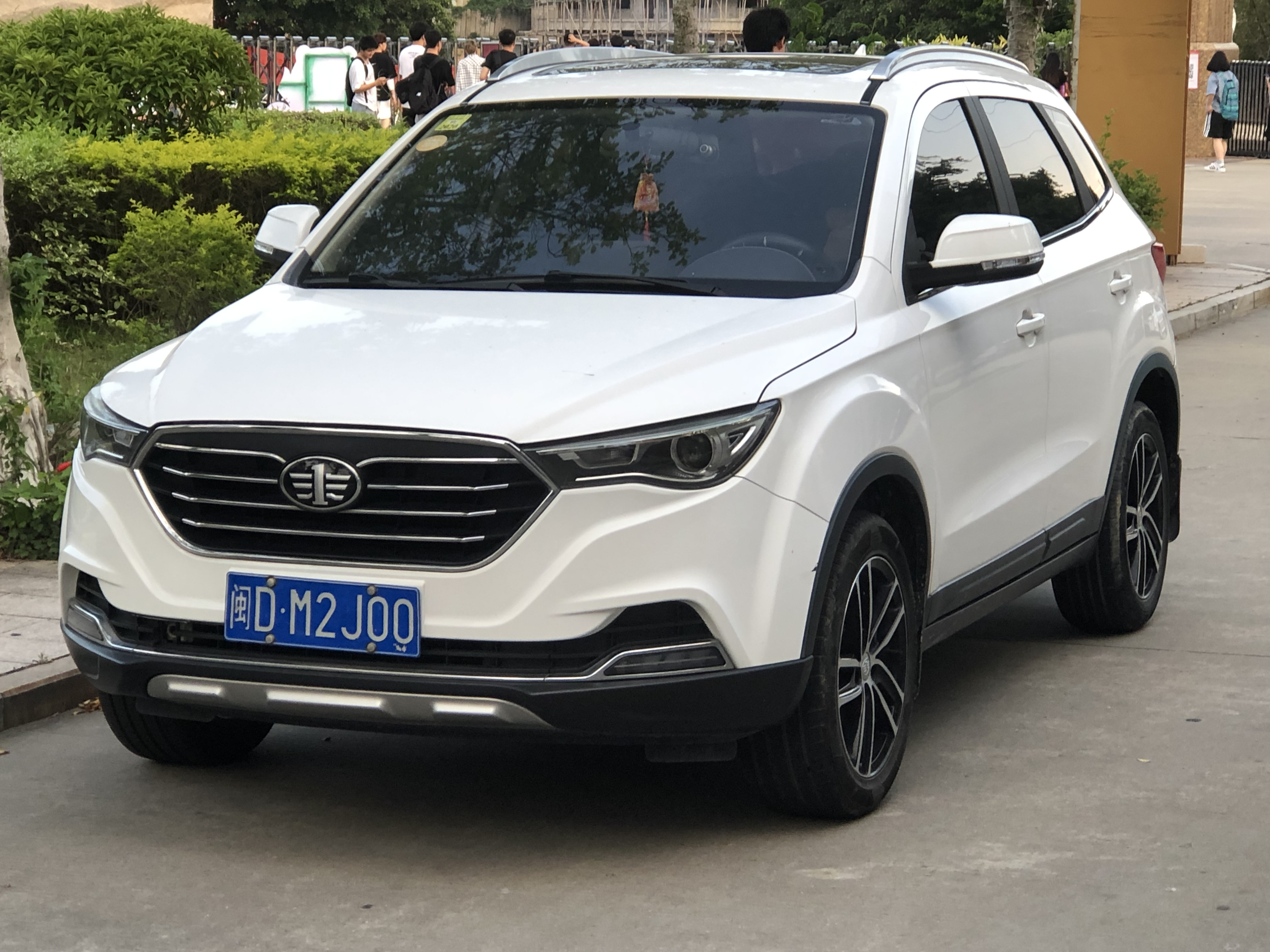
Bestune X40

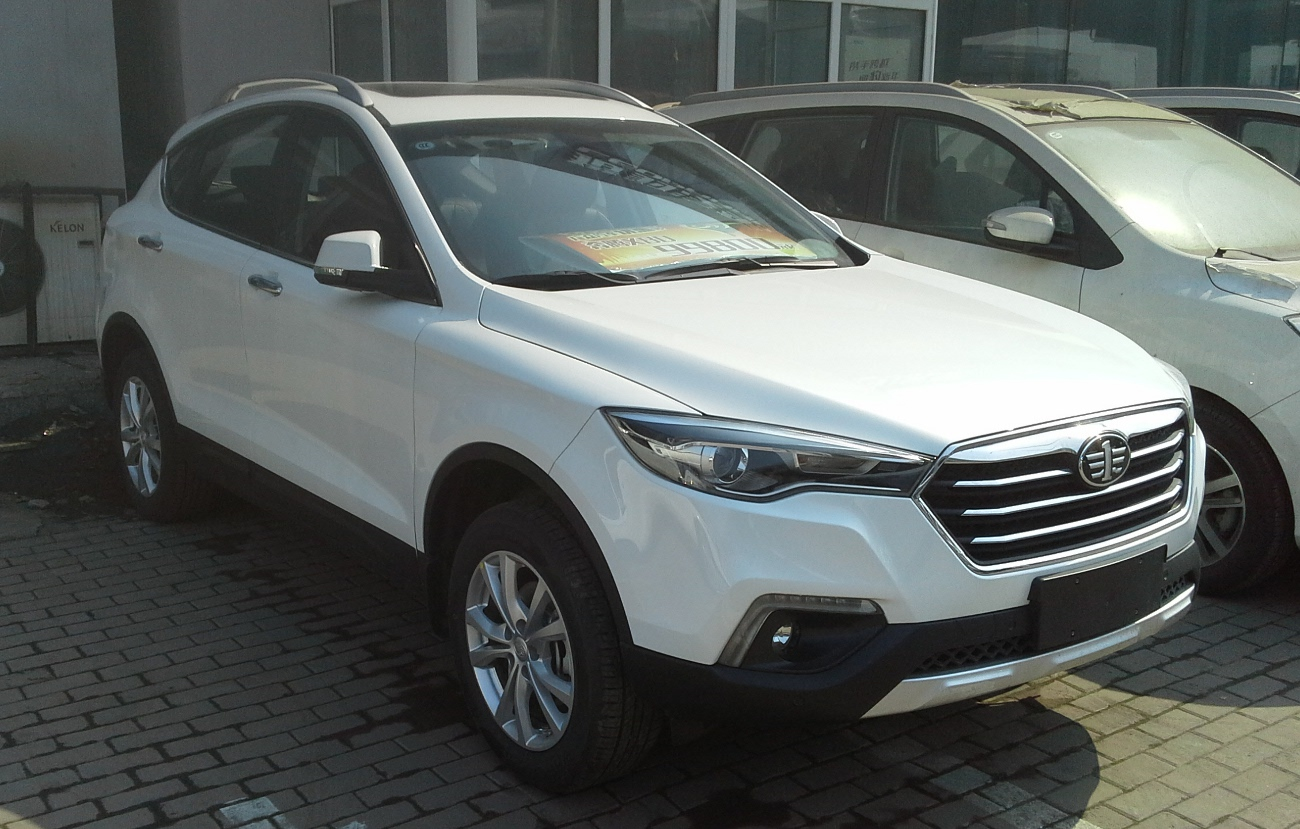
Bestune X80

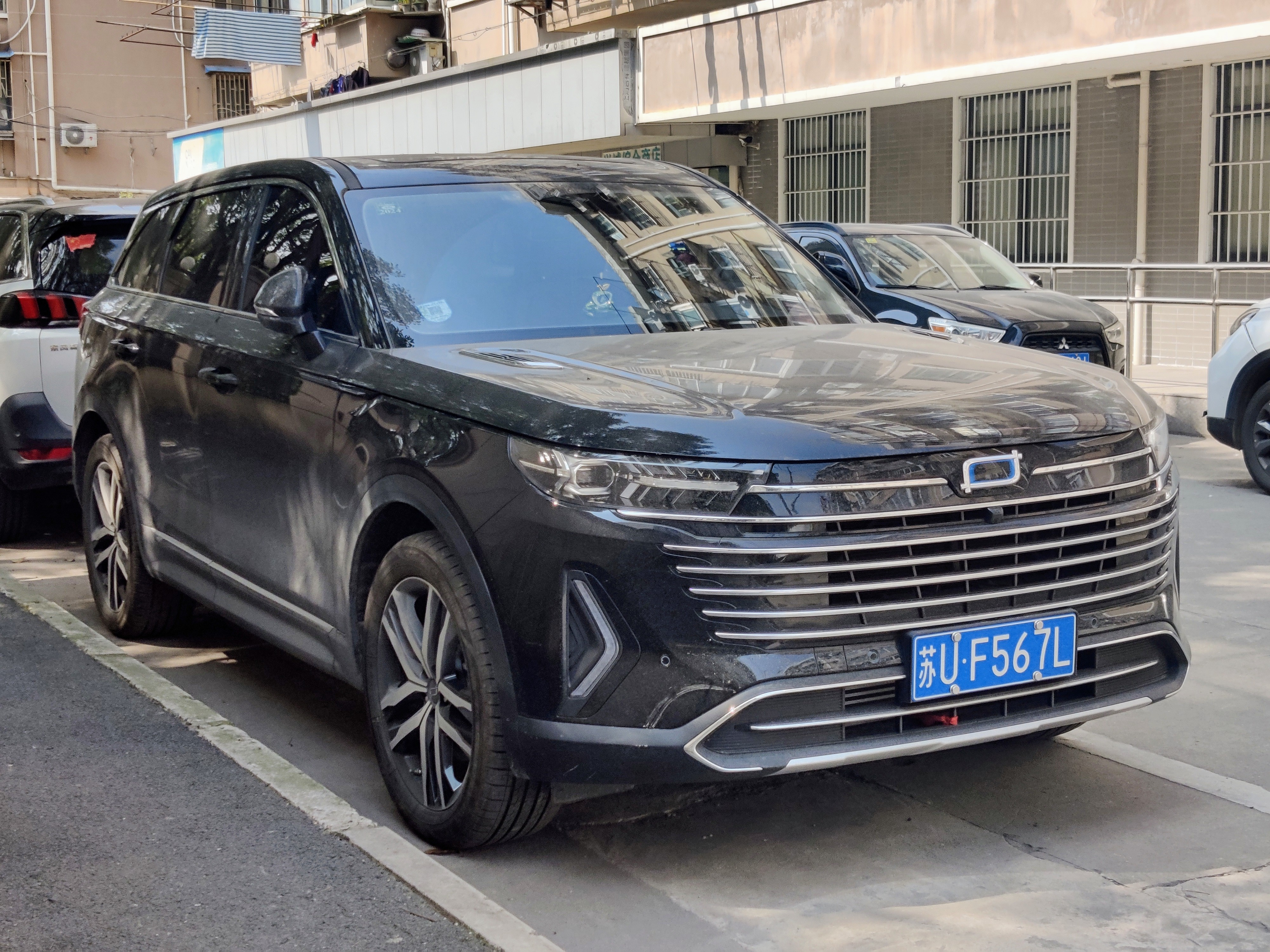
Bestune T99

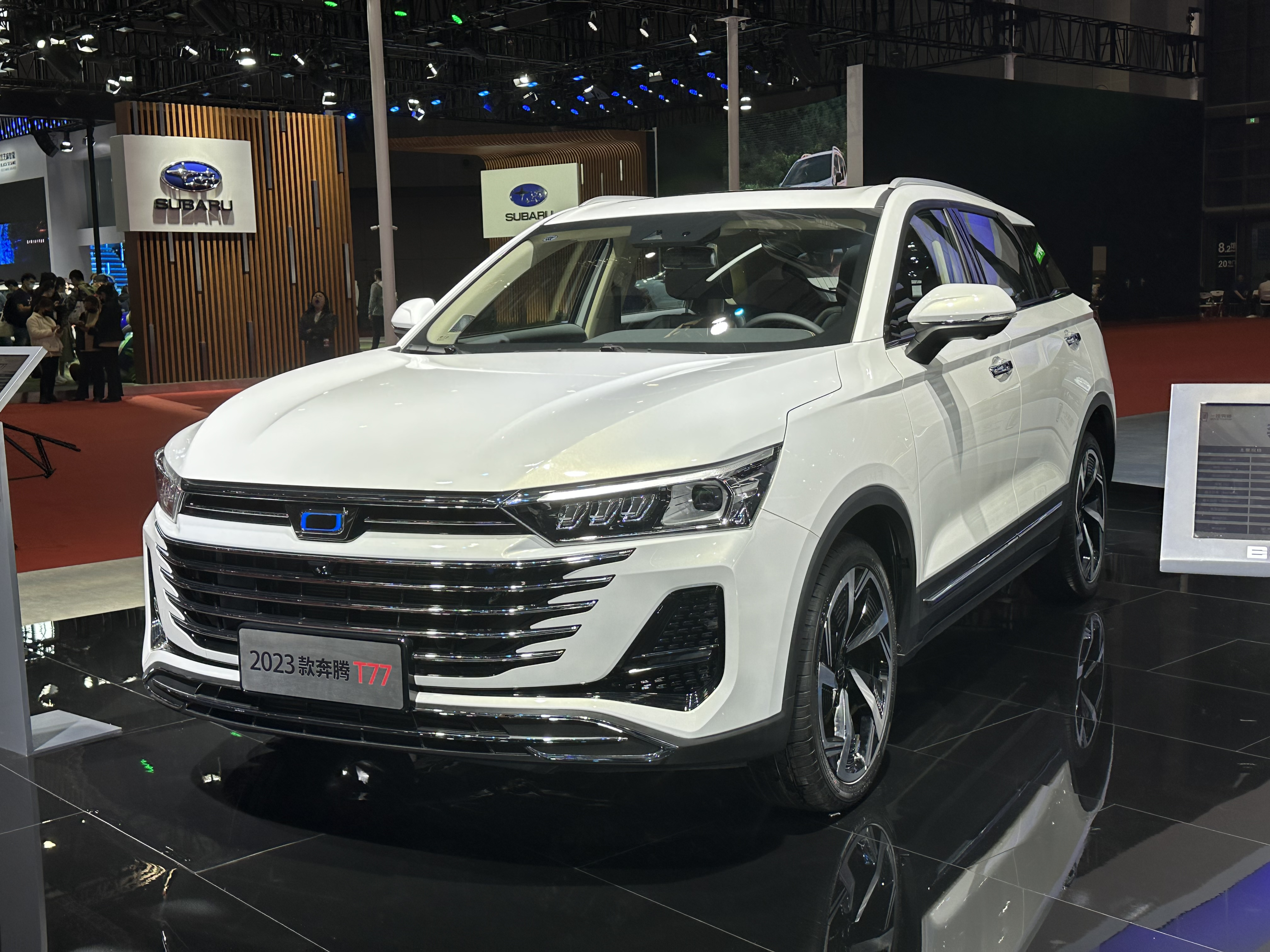
Bestune T77

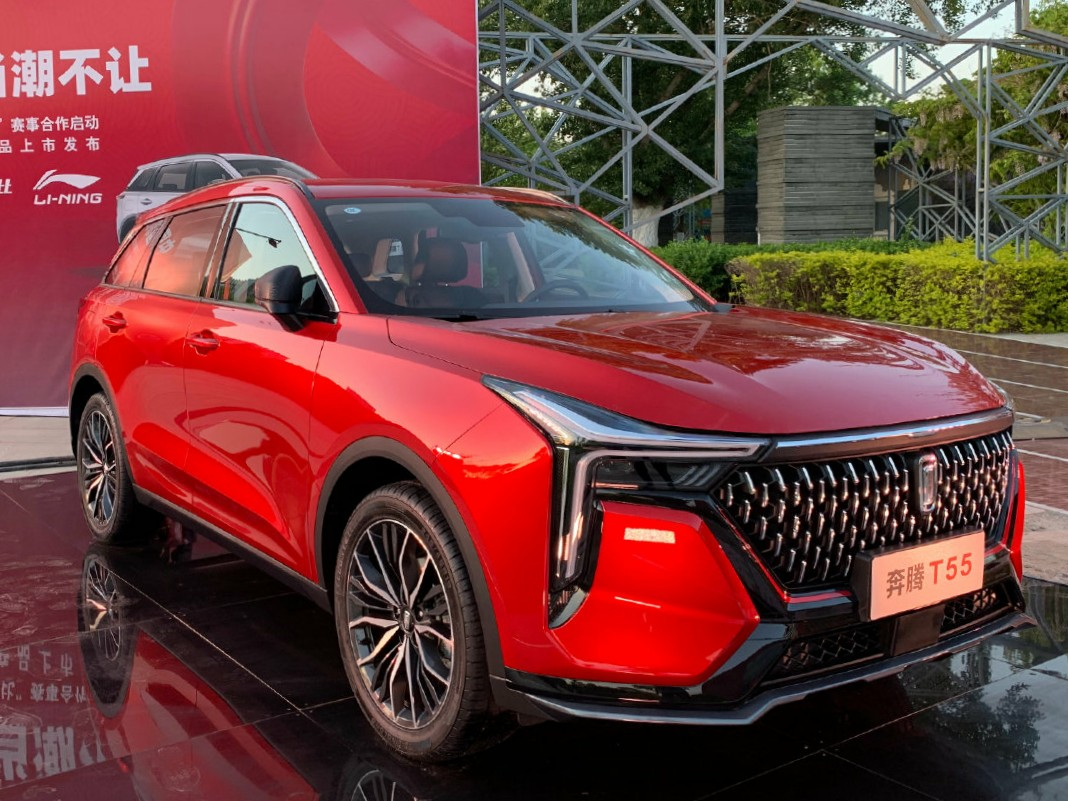
Bestune T55

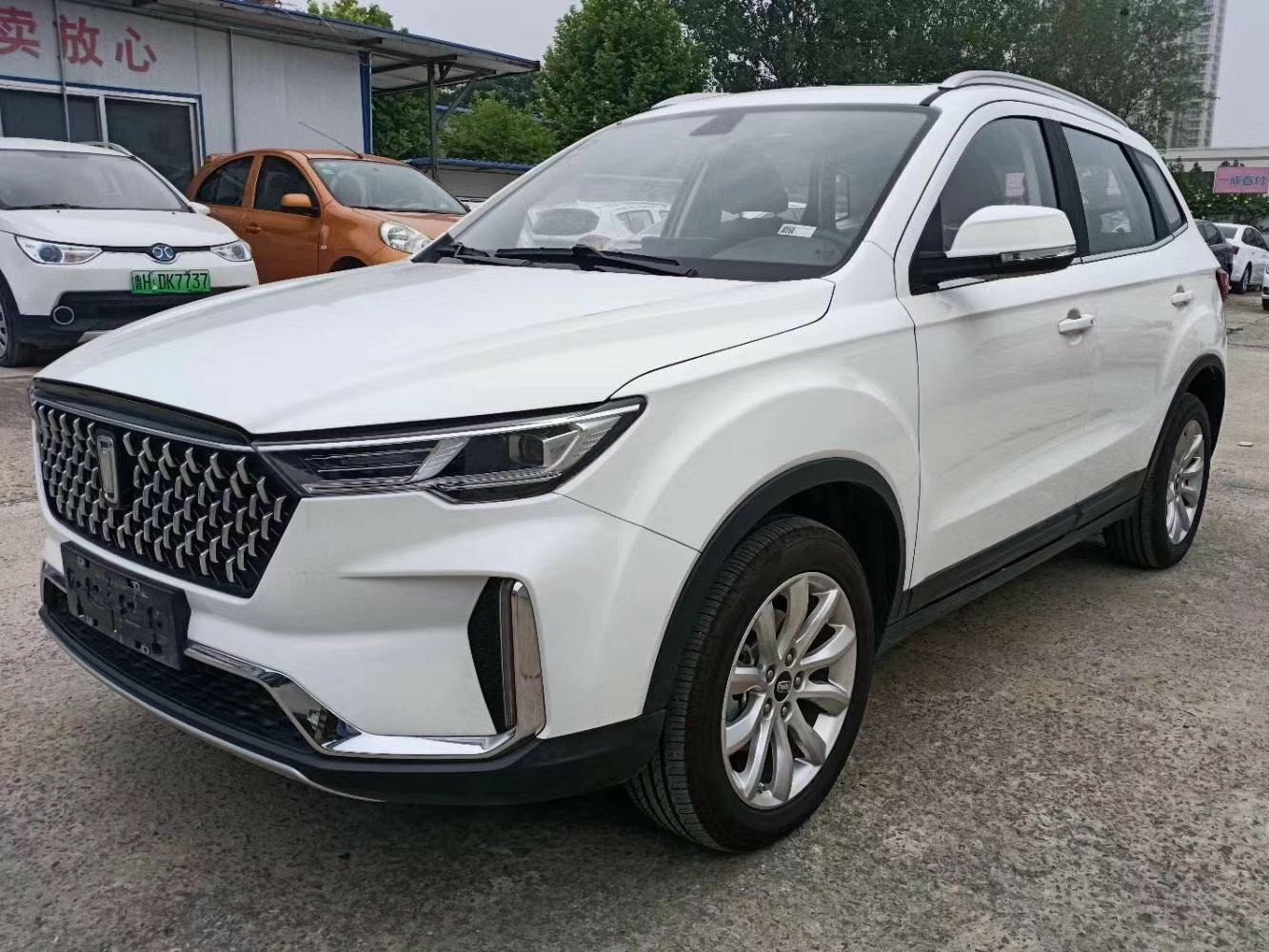
Bestune T33

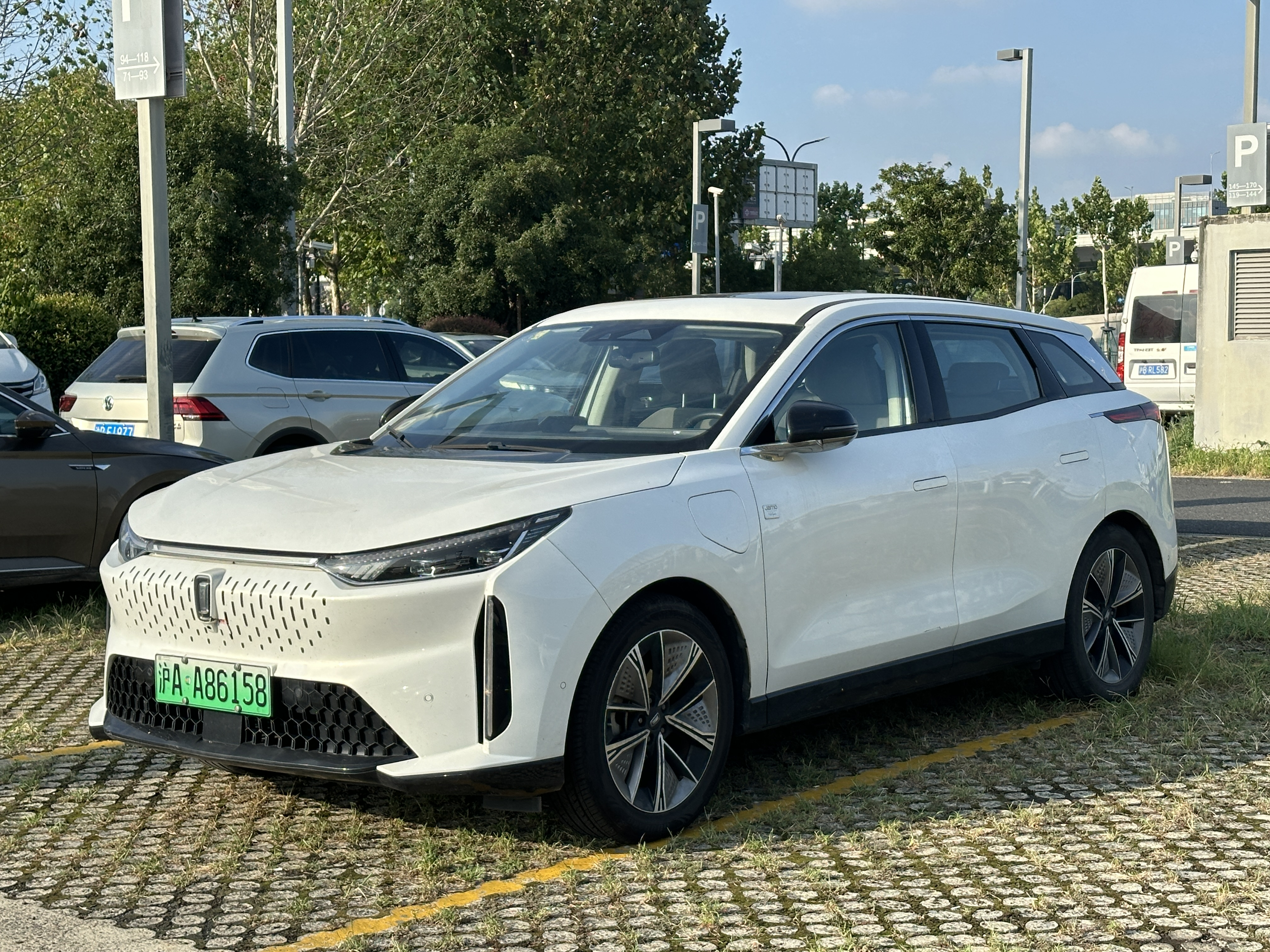
Bestune E01

=== Concept ===
- Bestune C105 Concept (2019)
- Bestune T99 Concept (2019)
- Bestune B² Concept (2020)
- Bestune Pony Concept (2023)

== Sales ==
Below are tables showing sales of Bestune models from the last couple of years.

NAT
Year	Sales
2021	9,118
2022	19,111

T99
Year	Sales
2019	3,956
2020	13,054
2021	6,268
2022	2,184

T77
Year	Sales
2018	10,757
2019	45,908
2020	28,344
2021	14,300
2022	10,247

T33
Year	Sales
2019	4,999
2020	3,812
2021	7,860

== See also ==
- Automobile manufacturers and brands of China
- List of automobile manufacturers of China
