= Bestune X80 =

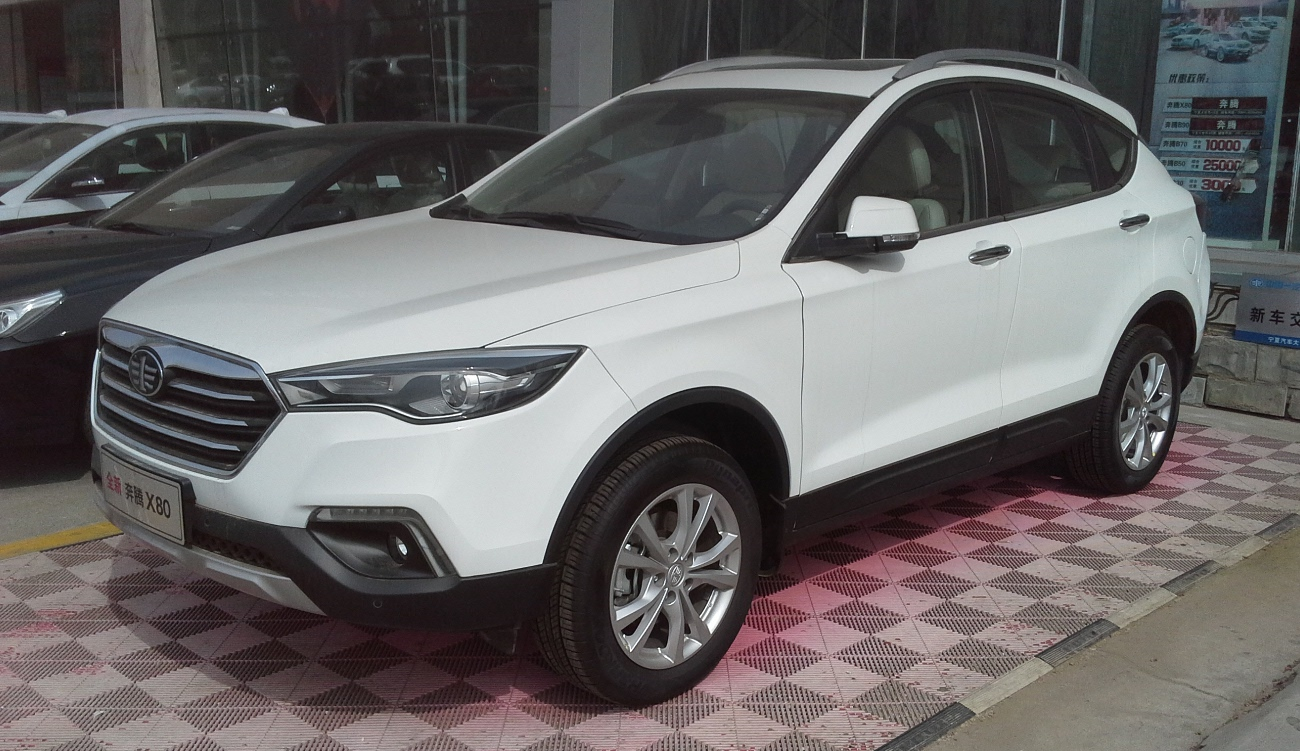

Overview
- Manufacturer: FAW Group - Bestune
- Also called: Pyeonghwa Ppeokkugi 2013 (North Korea)
- Production: 2013–2020
- Assembly: Changchun, China
- Designer: Mike Robinson

Body and chassis
- Class: Compact SUV (C-segment)
- Body style: 4-door SUV
- Layout: Front engine, Front-wheel drive

Powertrain
- Engine: 1.8 L CA4GC18T I4 turbo 2.0 L CA4GD1 I4; 2.3 L CA4GD3 I4
- Transmission: 6-speed manual 6-speed automatic

Dimensions
- Wheelbase: 2,685 mm (105.7 in)
- Length: 4,620 mm (181.9 in); 4,586 mm (180.6 in) (2013–2016)
- Width: 1,820 mm (71.7 in)
- Height: 1,695 mm (66.7 in)

The Bestune X80 (formerly Besturn X80) is a compact SUV produced by the Chinese car manufacturer Bestune.

== Overview ==
The Besturn X80 was previewed by the FAW X concept car that debuted on the 2011 Auto Shanghai, while the production version of the Besturn X80 first appeared at Auto Shanghai in 2013, and on 16 May of that year it came into Chinese dealerships.

Two of the engines of the Besturn X80 are sourced from Mazda, including a 146 hp 2.0 liter engine and a 154 hp 2.3 liter engine. Both engines are mated to either a 6-speed manual transmission or six-speed automatic transmission. A FAW-developed 1.8 liter turbo engine was added to the line-up later. The 2.3 liter engine was cancelled for the 2015 model year.

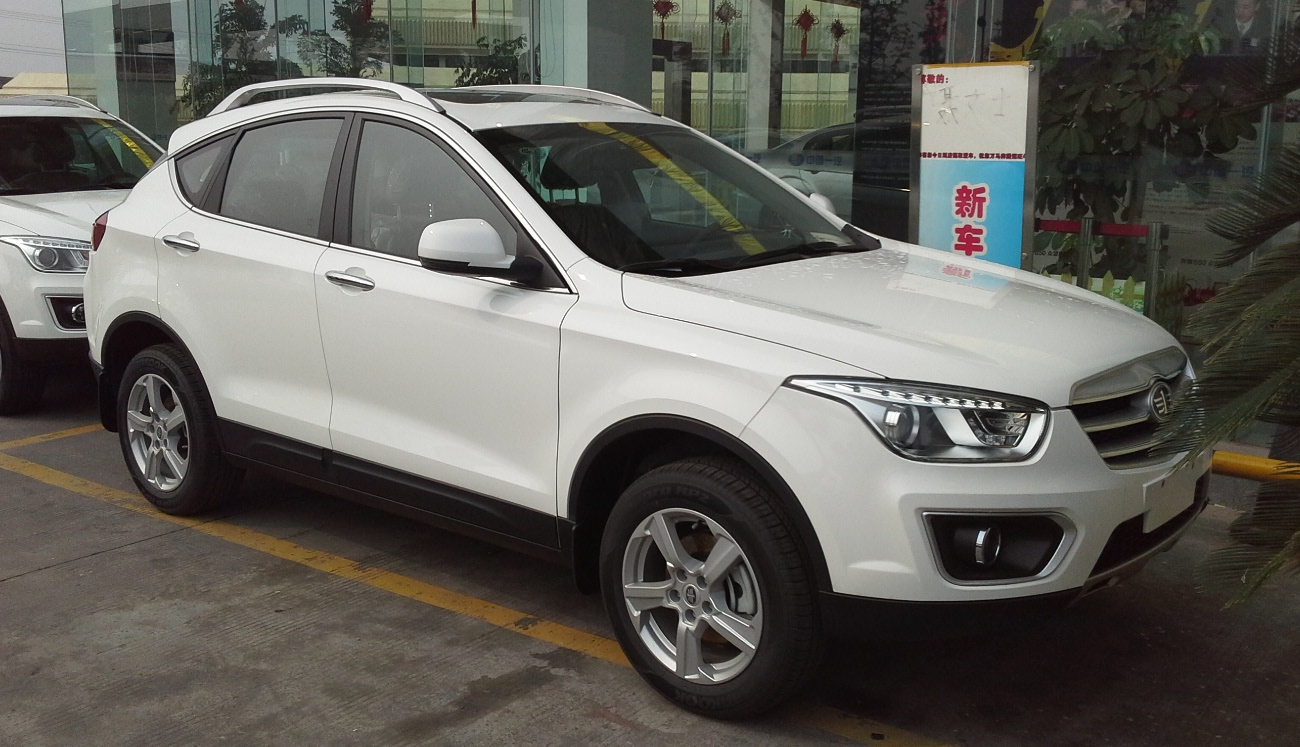
Besturn X80 front

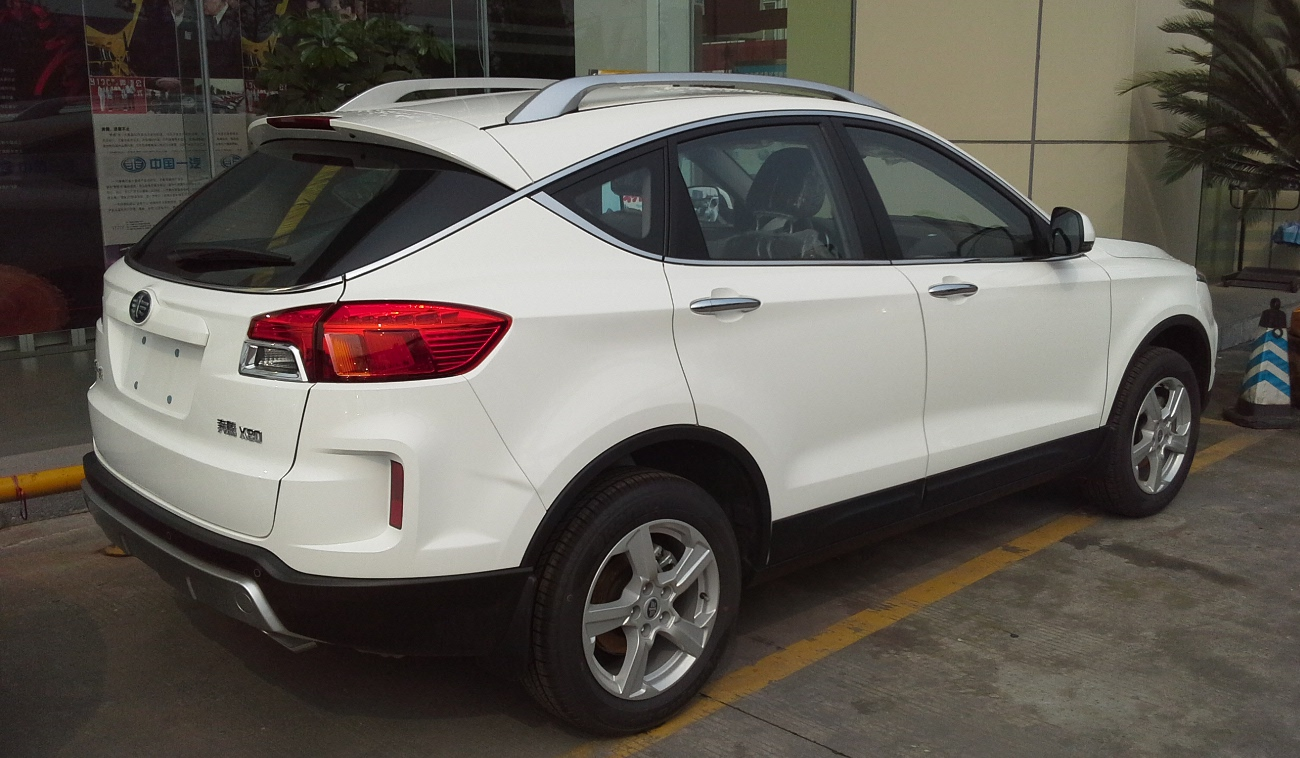
Besturn X80 rear

In September 2014, The Besturn X80 Sport was released on the Chinese car with a 155,800 yuan pricetag. The Besturn X80 Sport is the sporty variant of the Besturn X80 crossover. The Besturn X80 Sport is powered by a 1.8 liter turbocharged inline-four engine producing 186 hp and 235 nm and mated to a 6-speed automatic transmission. The new engine is also offered in the standard Besturn X80 as an option with the same amount of output.

A facelift for the 2017 model was introduced in 2016, featuring a restyled front end and slightly revised rear with the same powertrain. Another update was added in 2018, with the interior now equipped with a 12″ touchscreen integrated with the D-Life 2.0 intelligent system by FAW. The D-Life enable the owners to remotely start the vehicle, control the air conditioning and temperature, and turn on the seat heating function via a smartphone app. Additionally, the new voice command function can also control functions such as the air conditioning and satellite navigation. Other added features for 2018 are a panoramic sunroof, a built-in dash cam, and a power tailgate.

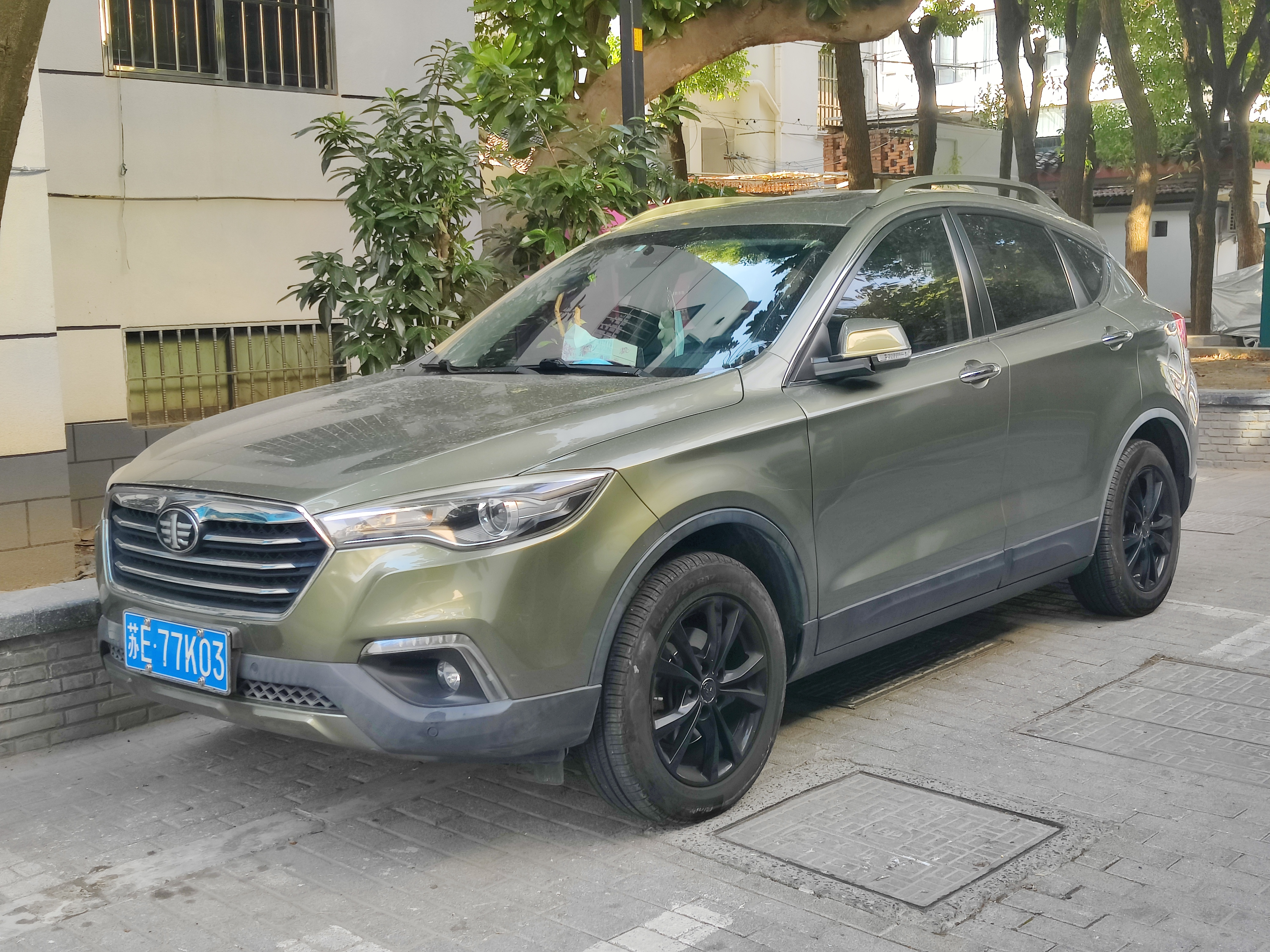
Besturn X80 facelift front

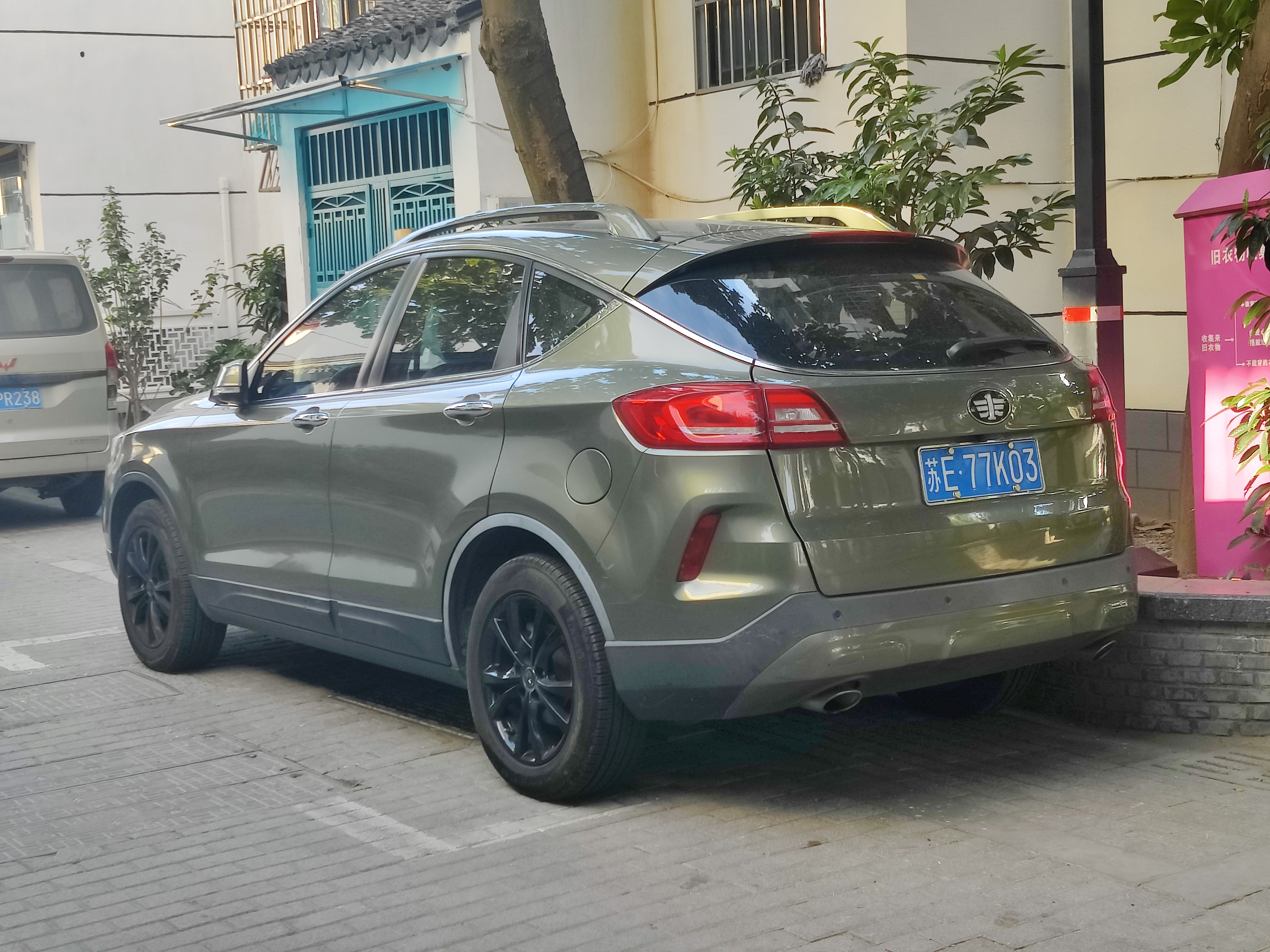
Besturn X80 facelift rear
