= Bestune E01 =

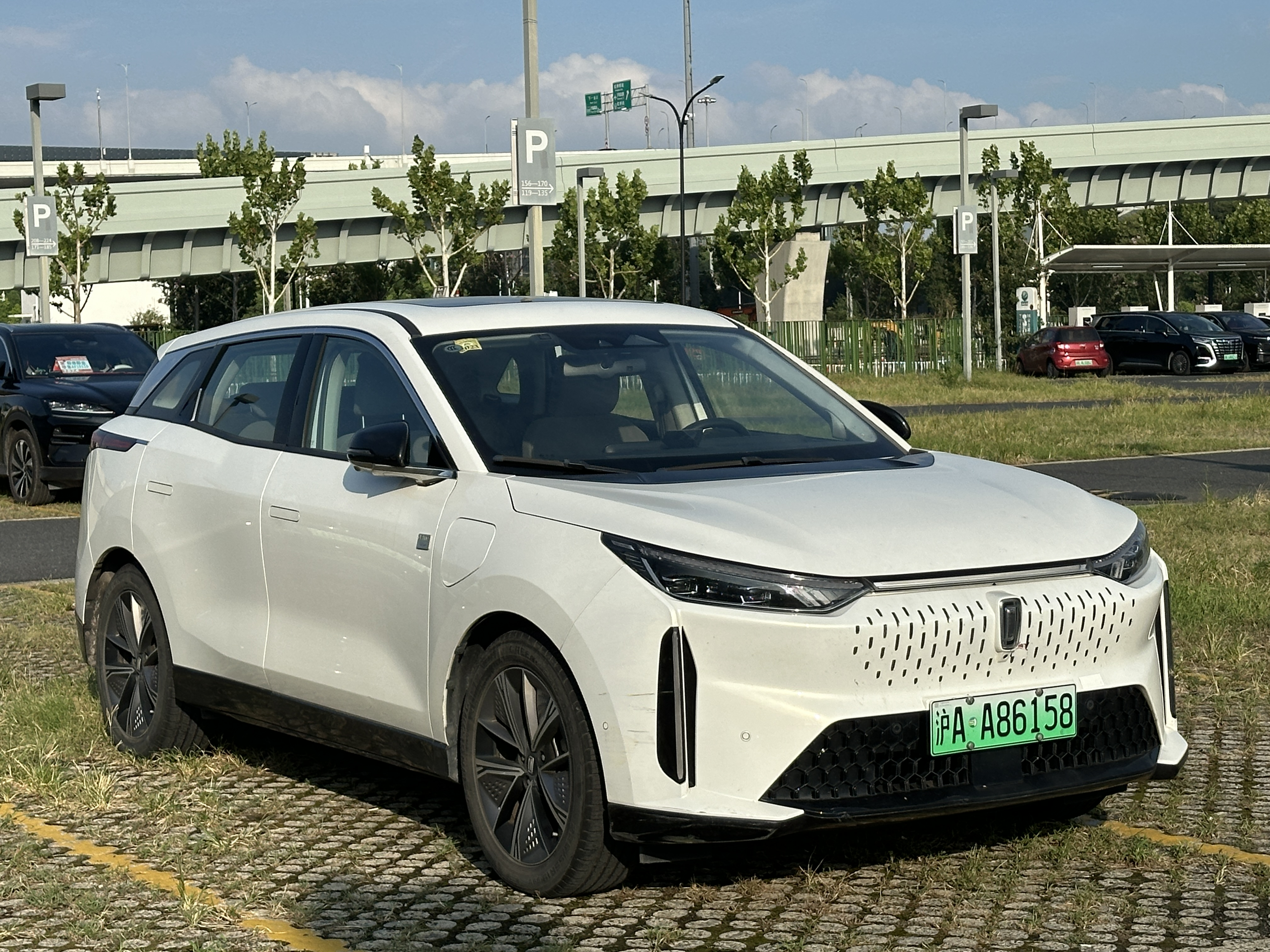

Overview
- Manufacturer: Bestune (FAW Group)
- Model code: C105
- Production: 2020–2025
- Assembly: China: Changchun

Body and chassis
- Class: Compact crossover SUV (C)
- Body style: 5-door SUV

Powertrain
- Electric motor: 100–140 kW (140–190 PS; 130–190 hp) Permanent Magnet Synchronous Motor
- Battery: 61.34 kWh battery

Dimensions
- Wheelbase: 2,810 mm (110.6 in)
- Length: 4,639 mm (182.6 in)
- Width: 1,880 mm (74.0 in)
- Height: 1,640 mm (64.6 in)
- Curb weight: 1,810 kg (3,990 lb)

The Bestune E01 (Chinese: 奔騰E01) is a battery electric compact crossover SUV produced by the FAW Group under the brand name Bestune.

== Overview ==
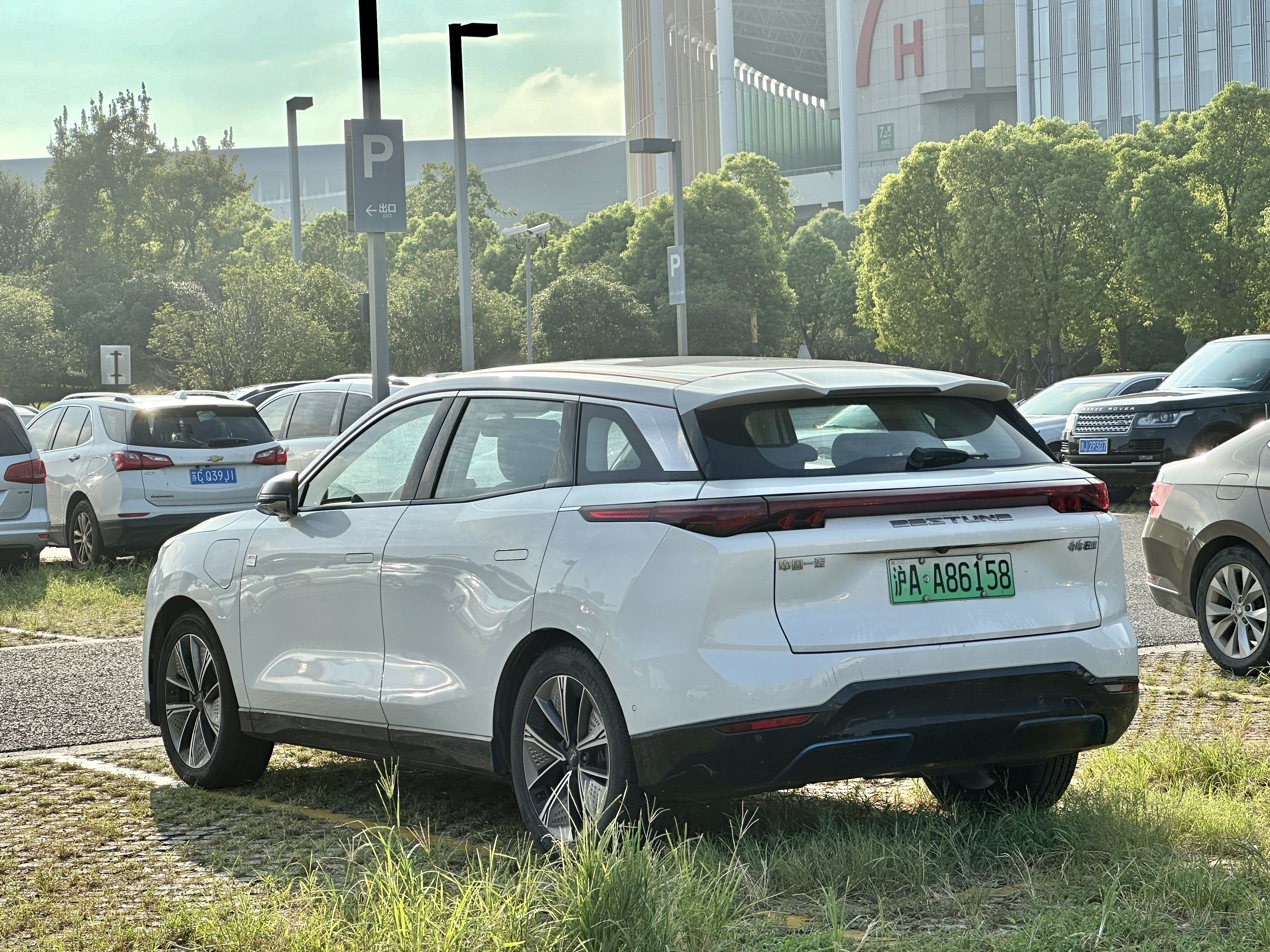
Rear view

The Bestune E01 was first shown at the 2020 Auto China. The E01 comes with a 3D holographic assistant. Its dimensions measure 4,639 mm/1,880 mm/1,640 mm, and can seat 5. It has a 61.34 kWh battery, 190 horsepower, a range of 450 km, and a top speed of 170 km/h.
