= CA 141 =

CA-141 may refer to:

- CA141/CA1091, a carrier truck
- Curtola Parkway, formerly signed as CA-141
