= ZIS-150 =

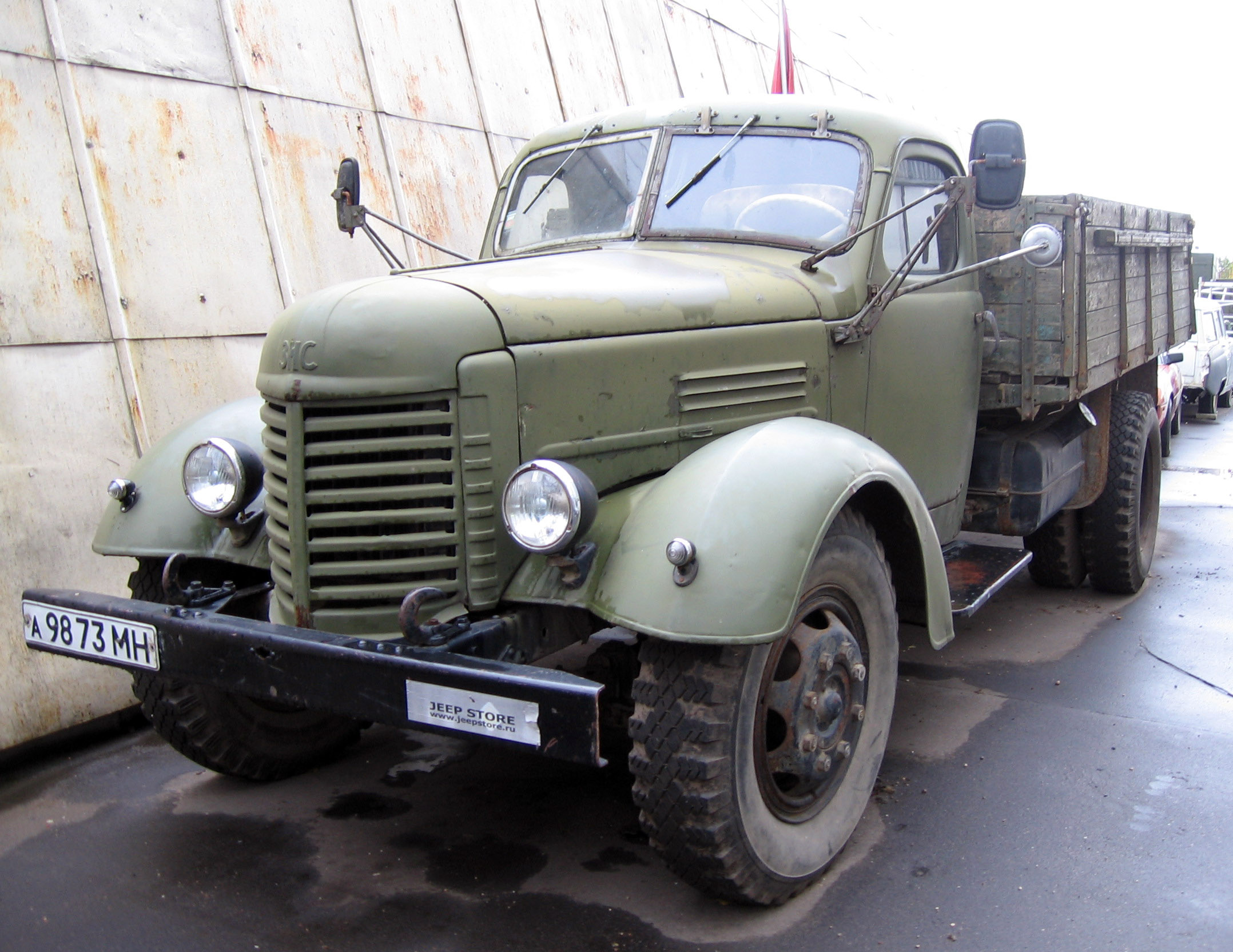
- ZIS-150B

Overview
- Manufacturer: ZIS
- Also called: ZIL-150 (1956–1958); KAZ-150 (Georgia); SR-101 (Romania); FAW Jiefang CA-10 (China)
- Production: 1947–1965 (ZIS/ZIL); 1954–1960 (Steagul Roșu); 1958–1986 (FAW Jiefang); 2,056,117 produced
- Assembly: Soviet Union: Moscow; Romania: Braşov; China: Changchun; Georgia: Kutaisi

Body and chassis
- Class: Truck
- Layout: FR layout
- Related: International KB-7

Powertrain
- Engine: 5.6 L ZIS-150 I6
- Transmission: 5-speed manual

Dimensions
- Wheelbase: 4,000 mm (157.5 in)
- Length: 6,720 mm (264.6 in)
- Width: 2,385 mm (93.9 in)
- Height: 2,180 mm (85.8 in)
- Curb weight: 3,900 kg (8,598 lb) (ZIS-150); 3,815 kg (8,411 lb) (ZIS-120N)

Chronology
- Predecessor: ZIS-5
- Successor: ZIL-130

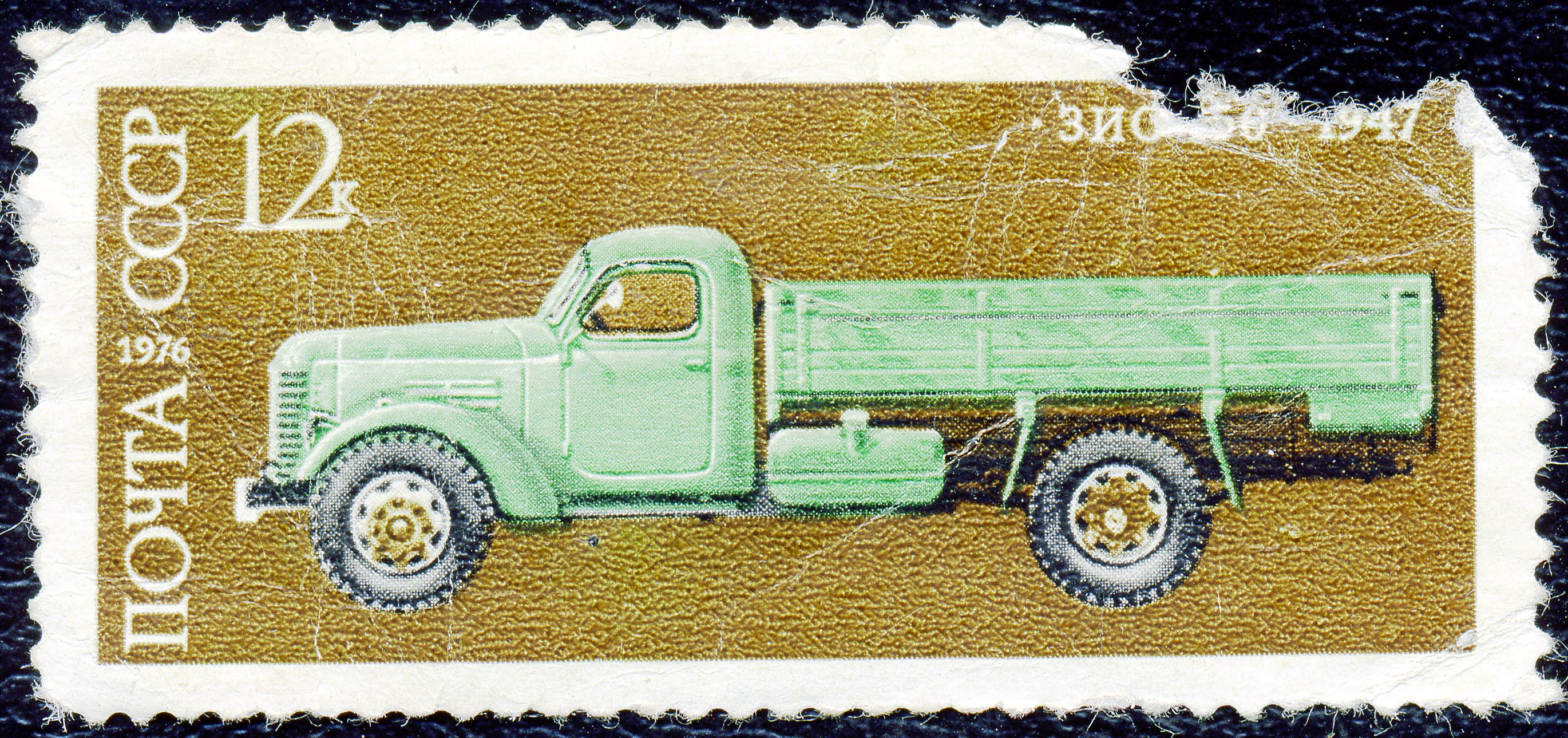
ZIS-150 on a Soviet postage stamp

The ZIS-150 is a Soviet truck. In 1947 it replaced the ZIS-5 truck on the assembly line. Together with the GAZ-51, it was the main Soviet truck during the 1950s, judging by their quantity. A tractor-trailer version of the ZIS-150, the ZIS-120N was sold from 1956 to 1957. In 1957, the base ZIS-150 model was replaced by ZIL-164, which differed outwardly only by vertical grille bars and bumper.

== History ==
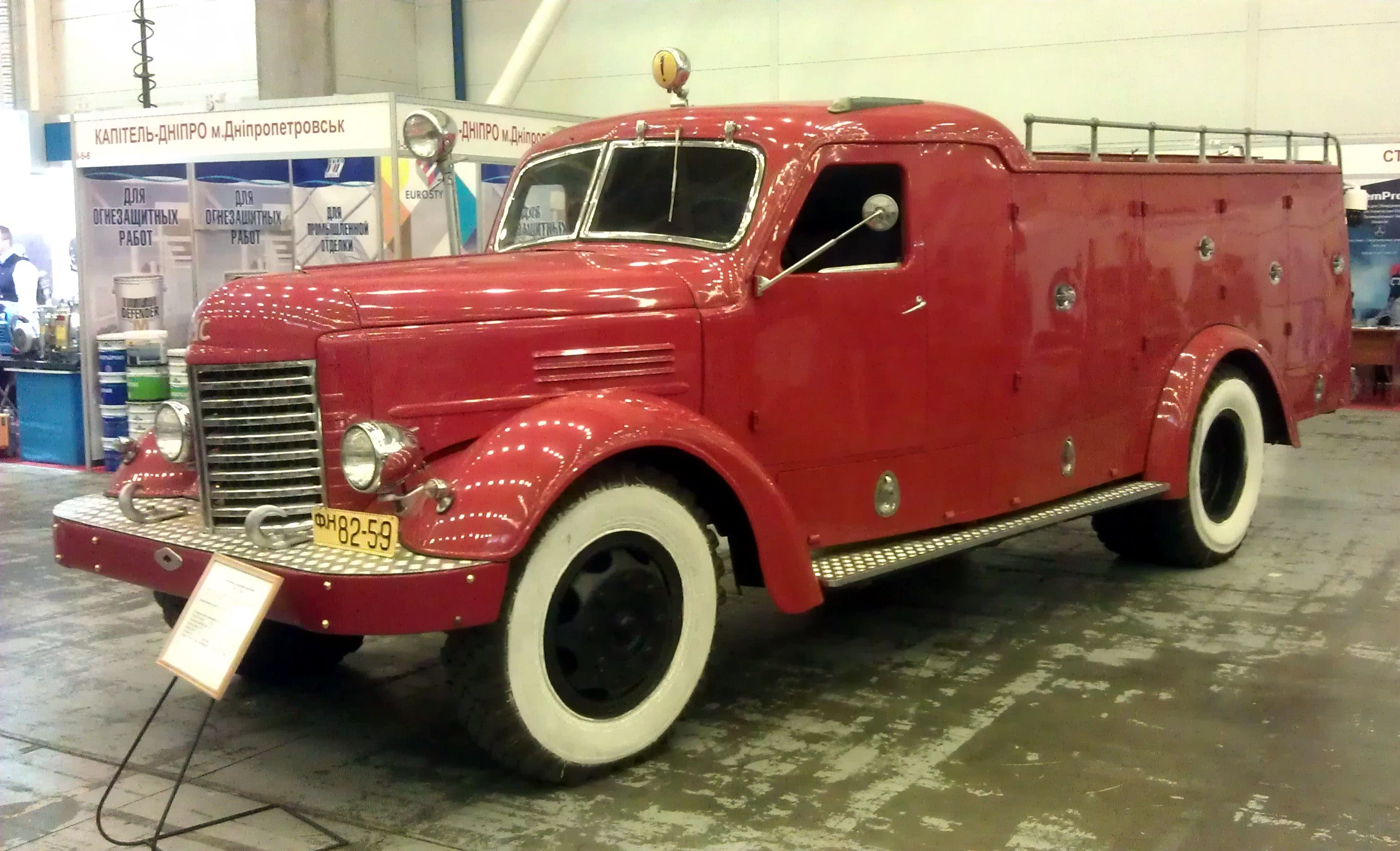
Fire engine ARP-2 based on the ZIS-150 (2015)

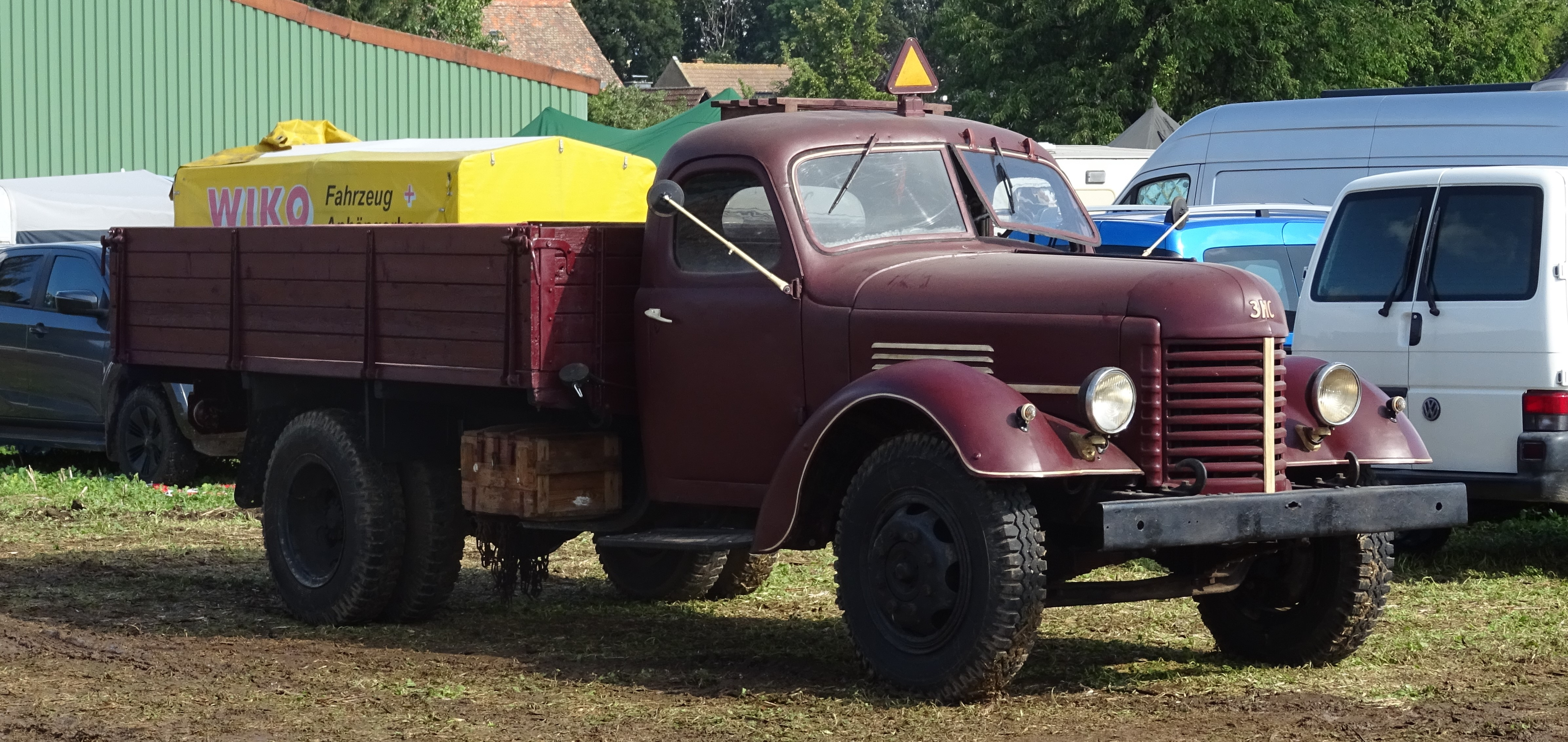
Restored ZIS-150 in Wersdorf (Germany) (2023)

Already at the end of the 1930s, the ZIS-5 truck (ЗИС-5) was to be replaced by a modern design. Since the Soviet automobile industry had gained experience with US designs through the licensed production of the Ford AA as GAZ-AA, its new developments were strongly influenced by American truck construction. This applied in particular to the design, but also to the widespread installation of gasoline engines instead of diesel engines. In 1938, the Stalin Works presented the newly designed vehicle under the name ZIS-15 (ЗИС-15). The ZIS-15 had a newly developed chassis, an advanced engine with an output of 82 hp (60 kW) and a new all-metal cab with three seats.

It was not until 1944 that the Stalin factory built further prototypes, which were now given the name ZIS-150. The Lend-Lease Act brought a large amount of U.S. technology to the Soviet Union during the war, including International K-7 trucks, which heavily influenced the Soviet vehicle, especially in styling.

On October 30, 1947, the first small series were introduced. Testing before the Second World War had already shown that the truck with 82 hp (60 kW) was too weakly engined. The ZIS-150 now received an uprated engine with 95 hp (70 kW), the payload could be increased to 4000 kg. The assembly line for production was set up at the plant from January 1948. Serial production began on April 27 of this year, and production of the ZIS-5 was finally halted three days later. From 1951, the ZIS-150 was also produced in the Kutaysky Avtomobilny Zavod. In 1956, Stalin's name was erased and the manufacturing plant was renamed Zavod imeni Likhacheva (Завод имени Лихачёва). In the following year, production of the vehicle, now called the ZIL-150, was discontinued in favor of its successor, the ZIL-164, which however was basically nothing more than a modernized and modified variant of the ZIS-150 truck. A total of 774,615 ZIS-150 vehicles were produced in various versions.

The new vehicle received a number of differences; the new engine differed from the previously installed make mainly in the revised light-alloy cylinder heads. As a result, the performance could be slightly increased by increasing the compression ratio. Other innovations included a revised braking system, which now also allowed trailers to be coupled to the vehicle's main braking system. Visually, the vehicles differed mainly in the modified radiator grille, the struts of which now ran vertically instead of horizontally. The chassis has been revised, as has the cabin. In addition, an engine preheater was installed and other minor adjustments were made to keep the truck operational even at low temperatures.

Production of this modernized variant ended in 1965.

== Mechanics ==
The truck was powered by a six-cylinder engine ZIS-120 (ЗИС-120). For the first time in Soviet commercial vehicle construction, a five-speed manual transmission was used, which was connected to the engine via a two-disc dry clutch. Also new in Soviet truck construction were air-operated brakes. The rear axle had twin tyres, all axles were sprung with leaf springs and designed as rigid axles. The weak point of the design was the cardan shaft, which tended to crack and then broke under full load. In the process, the hoses of the compressed air system were often destroyed, which led to a sudden loss of braking power.

The cabin consisted of a wooden scaffolding, which was planked with sheet metal and provided with protective varnish. The doors were made of wood. The side windows were retractable, the left half of the two-part windscreen could be flared.

In 1950, the ZIS-150 was modernized. The vehicle got a new carburetor and a new exhaust manifold, and the cab was now made entirely of metal.

In 1956, the truck's engine was fitted with a light-alloy cylinder head, and the compression ratio increased to 6.2. Together with the new intake system, this led to an increase in output to 71 kW. The frame was reinforced, the vehicle was now fitted with hydraulic shock absorbers and the travel of the leaf springs on the front axle was limited by rubber buffers. As part of the renaming of the manufacturer's plant, the thermoforming tool for the bonnet was also changed, as the abbreviation of the name was embossed into it.

== Foreign production ==
The Kutaisi Auto Mechanical Plant started producing a copy of the ZIS-150 in 1951 under the designation KAZ-150. Production of the truck soon started in other Communist countries, such as Romania (under the SR-101 name) by "Steagul Roșu" (The Red Flag) in Braşov, between 1954 and 1960, in China (under the Jiefang CA-10 name) by First Automobile Works until 1986 and a prototype was also built in North Korea under the name Cholima, but did not enter production.

Parts of the SR-101's chassis were still used for its successor, the SR-131 "Carpați".

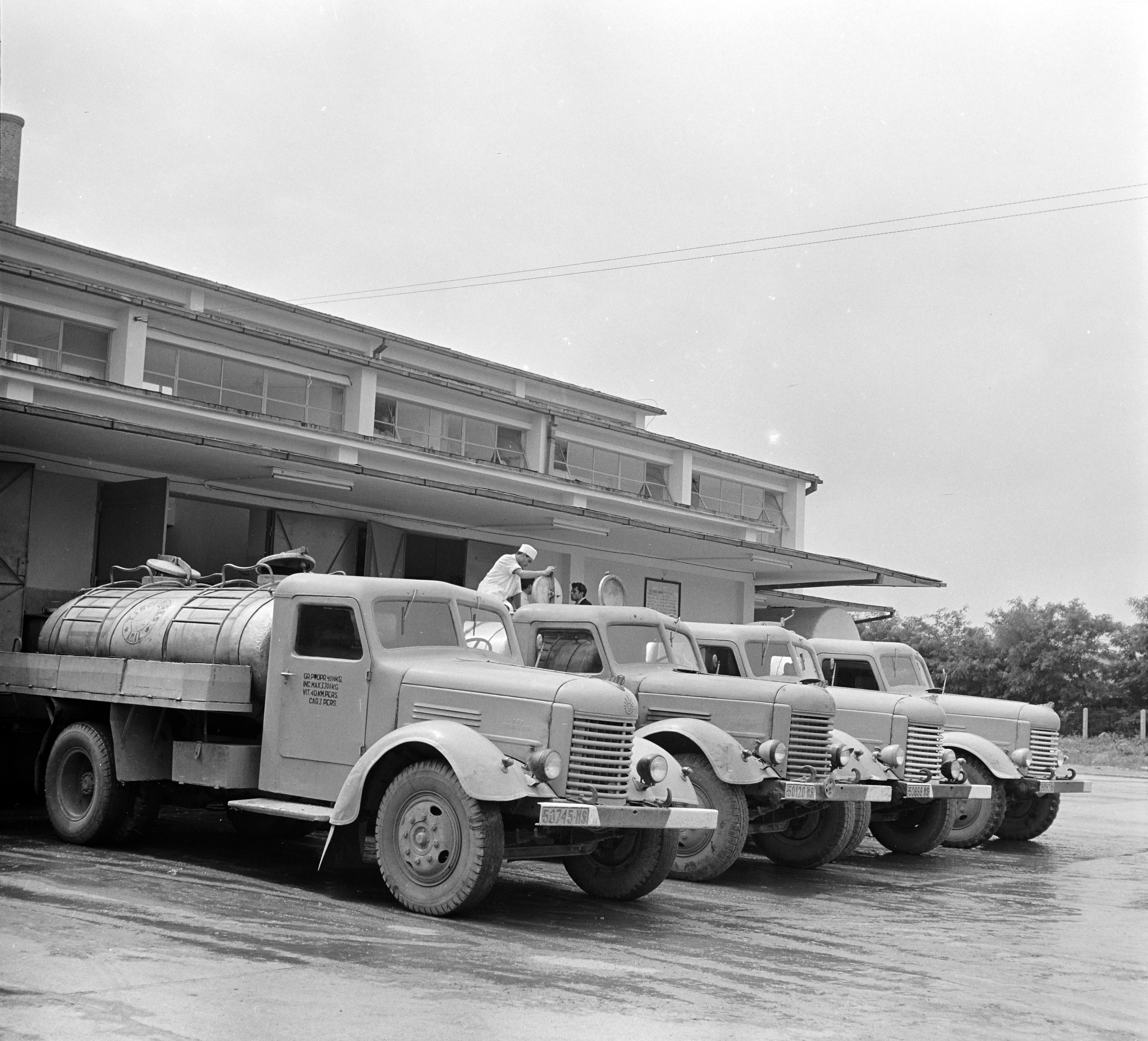
Romanian SR-101 tanker trucks

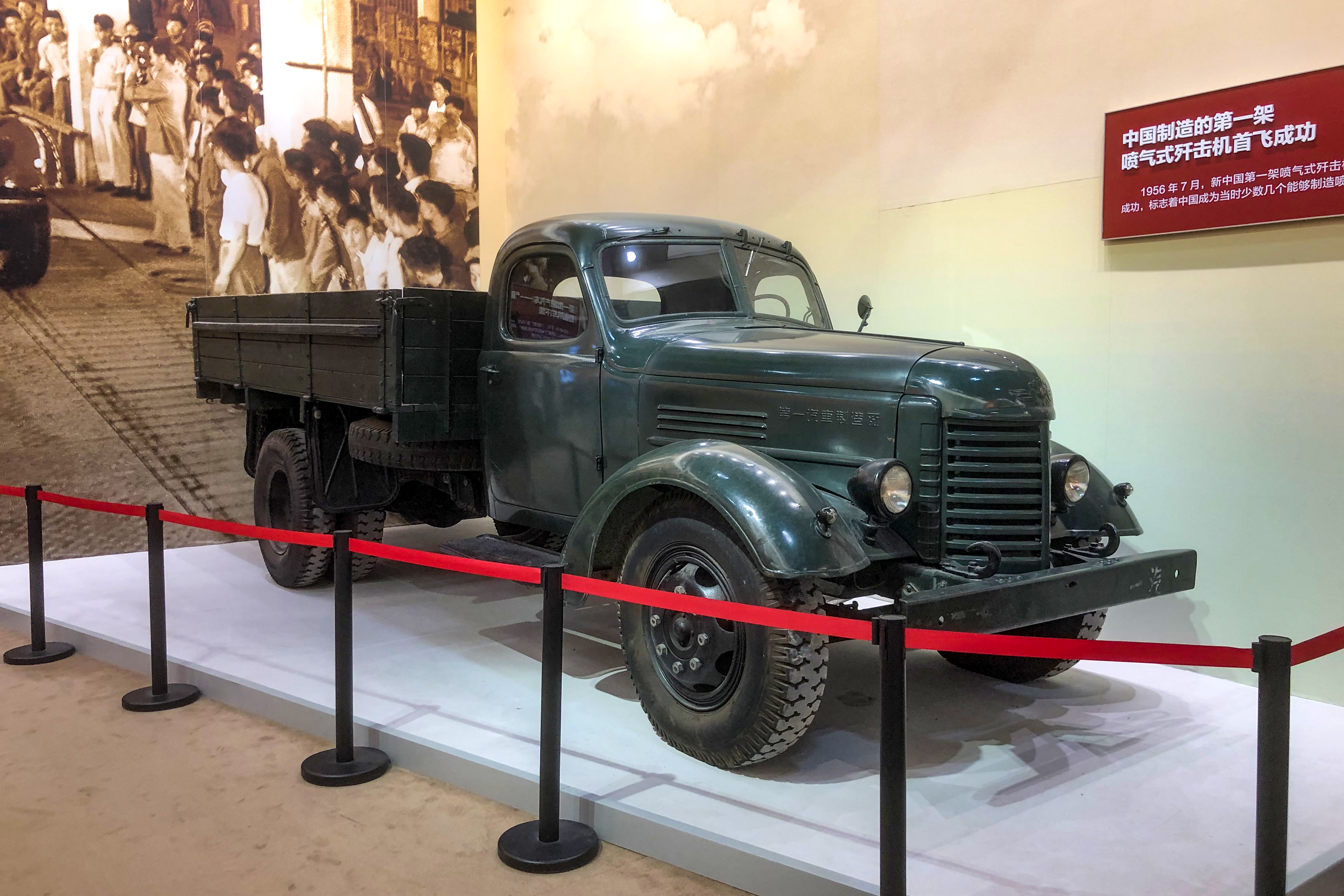
Jiefang CA10 at PRC70 Exhibition

== Specifications ==
- 4x2 4000 kg truck
- Engine: 90 hp/2400 rpm, 6-cyl, 5555 cc
- Bore/Stroke: 101.6/114.3 mm
- Length: 6,720 mm (264.6 in), width: 2,385 mm (93.9 in), height: 2,180 mm (85.8 in)
- Wheelbase: 4,000 mm (157.5 in), rear axis clearance: 265 mm (10.4 in)
- Front wheel track: 1,700 mm (66.9 in)
- Rear track: 1,740 mm (68.5 in)
- Turning radius on front outer wheel: 8.0 m (26.2 ft)
- Compression ratio: 6.0
- Clutch: twin disk, dry
- Gearbox: 5 speeds
- Weight (without load): 3,900 kg (8,598 lb)
- Maximal speed (loaded, highway): 65 km/h (40 mph)
- Tyres: 9.00x20 inches
- Fuel capacity: 150 L (40 US gal; 33 imp gal)
- Fuel consumption: 29 L/100 km (9.7 mpg_{‑imp}; 8.1 mpg_{‑US})

== Variants ==
- ZIS-150: Original production version. Produced 1947–1957.
- ZIS-120G: Chassis-cab version for fitting of dump bodies. Produced 1949–1957.
- ZIS-120I: Chassis-cab version for fitting of dump bodies. Differed from the ZIS-120G in that the spare wheel was moved from the passenger side behind the cab to under the dump body itself. Produced in 1955.
- ZIS-120N: Tractor-trailer version. Produced 1956–1957.
- ZIS-120R: Prototype cab-chassis version (for tractor), based on ZIS-150V prototype. Produced in 1955.
- ZIS-120S: Prototype chassis-cab version (for dump truck), based on ZIS-150V prototype. Produced in 1955.
- ZIS-125: Prototype 5 ton version.
- ZIS-150A: Prototype four wheel drive version. Produced in 1944.
- ZIS-150B: Prototype modernized version of ZIS-150. Produced in 1954.
- ZIS-150E & ZIS-150Yu: Chassis-cab versions for export markets.
- ZIS-150M: Prototype modernized version of ZIS-150. Produced in 1951.
- ZIS-150M: Prototype 5 ton version. Produced in 1954; led to the ZIL-130.
- ZIS-150P: Cowl-chassis version. Produced 1952–1954.
- ZIS-150V: Prototype modernized version of ZIS-150. Produced in 1954.
- ZIS-151: Three-axle version. Produced 1948–1958.
- ZIS-156: Dual-fuel (CNG and gasoline) version of the ZIS-150. Produced 1949–1957.
  - ZIS-156A: Dual-fuel (LNG and gasoline) version of the ZIS-150. Produced 1955–1957.
  - ZIS-156B: Prototype dual-fuel (LNG and gasoline) version of the ZIS-150V; LPG equipment was identical to the ZIS-156. Produced in 1955.
  - ZIS-156V: Prototype dual-fuel (CNG and gasoline) version of the ZIS-150V; LPG equipment was identical to the ZIS-156. Produced in 1955.
- ZIL-164: Improved ZIS-150. Produced 1957–1961.
  - ZIL-164D: Version with shielded electrical equipment.
  - ZIL-164G: Cab-chassis version (for dump trucks).
  - ZIL-164N: Tractor-trailer version.
  - ZIL-164R: Flatbed version with towing equipment.
  - ZIL-164S: Export version for dry tropical climates.
  - ZIL-164V: Prototype tractor-trailer version. Produced in 1960.
  - ZIL-164Ye: Export version for temperate climates.
  - ZIL-164Yu: Export version for tropical climates.
- ZIL-164A: Modernized ZIL-164. Produced 1961–1964.
  - ZIL-164AD: Version with shielded electrical equipment.
  - ZIL-164AG: Cab-chassis version (for dump trucks).
  - ZIL-164AK: Prototype bucket carrier. Produced in 1964.
  - ZIL-164AN: Tractor-trailer version.
  - ZIL-164AR: Flatbed version with towing equipment.
  - ZIL-164AS: Export version for dry tropical climates.
  - ZIL-164AYe: Export version for temperate climates.
  - ZIL-164AYu: Export version for tropical climates.
- ZIL-166: Dual-fuel (CNG and gasoline) version of ZIL-164. Produced 1958–1960.
- ZIL-166A: Dual-fuel (LPG and gasoline) version. Produced 1957–1960.
- ZIL-166V: Modernized ZIL-166A. Produced 1961–1964.
  - ZIL-166D: As ZIL-166G, except with shielded electrical equipment. Produced in 1963.
  - ZIL-166G: Prototype LPG cab-chassis (for dump truck). Produced in 1963.
  - ZIL-166N: Prototype LPG-powered tractor-trailer version. Produced in 1963.

== See also ==
- GAZ-51
