= Kutaisi Auto Mechanical Plant =

Truck and automotive parts factory in Kutaisi, Georgia

Kutaisi Automobile Plant (KAZ)
- Founded: 1951
- Successor: Kutaisi Auto Mechanical Plant (KAMP)
- Headquarters: Kutaisi, Georgia (formerly Soviet Union)
- Products: Trucks
- Parent: Georgian Industrial Group
- Website: Kutaisi Auto Mechanical Plant (KAMP)

The Kutaisi Auto Mechanical Plant (KAMP) (Georgian: ქუთაისის ავტომექანიკური ქარხანა, romanized: kutaisis avt'omekanik'uri karkhana), formerly Kutaisi Automobile Plant (Georgian: ქუთაისის საავტომობილო ქარხანა, romanized: kutaisis saavt'omobilo karkhana; Russian: Кутаисский Автомобильный Завод, romanized: Kutaisskij Awtomobilnyj Zawod) or KAZ (Russian: КАЗ) for short, is a truck factory located in Kutaisi, Georgia.

== History ==
Construction began in 1945, using forced labor, notably Polish Home Army prisoners. The first ZIS-150 (KAZ-150) truck rolled off its production line on August 18th, 1951.

In 2006, a majority part of the company synced with the Georgian Industrial Group and was named the Kutaisi Auto Mechanical Plant (KAMP). Today, the factory produces a wide range of automotive industry parts, including spare parts for agricultural machinery, ropeways, railways and mining equipment.

== Products ==
- КАZ-150 - prototype improved ZIS-150 (1948); ultimately became a copy of the ZIS-150
- KAZ-120Т (Phоtо) - hydraulic tractor unit (1955); based on ZIS-150
- KAZ-120T3 - conventional tractor unit (1960); based on ZIL-164
- КАZ-585B (Phоtо) - dump truck (1952); based on ZIS-585
  - KAZ-585V - improved KAZ-585B (1955)
  - KAZ-585V1 - experimental dump truck (1956); based on KAZ-150 prototype
- КАZ-600 (Phоtо) - construction dump truck (1955); based on ZIS-150
  - KAZ-600A - experimental two-way dump truck (1956); based on ZIS-120G
  - KAZ-600AV - modernized KAZ-600V (1962); based on ZIL-164A
  - KAZ-600V - two-way dump truck (1956); based on ZIS-150
- КАZ-601 (Phоtо) - cement truck (1955); based on ZIS-150
  - KAZ-601V - modernized KAZ-601 (1955)
- KAZ-602 - construction dump truck (1956); based on ZIS-150
- KAZ-605 (Phоtо) - prototype cabover truck (1958, 1961); based on ZIL-164
  - KAZ-606 "Kolkhida" (Phоtо) - tractor unit (1958); based on KAZ-605
  - KAZ-606A "Kolkhida" (Phоtо) - modernized KAZ-606 (1962)
- KAZ-608 "Kolkhida" (Phоtо) - tractor unit (1967); based on ZIL-130
  - КАZ-608В "Kolkhida" - prototype version of KAZ-608 with two-speed rear axle (1966)
  - KAZ-608D - truck tractor (1969)
  - KAZ-608G - prototype flatbed version of KAZ-608 (1969)
  - KAZ-608V - improved KAZ-608 (1976)
  - KAZ-608V2 - improved KAZ-608V (1986)
- KAZ-620 - planned 6x4 tractor unit (1963); never built
- KAZ-4430 - prototype all-wheel drive tractor unit (1974)
- KAZ-44302
- КАZ-4502 "Kolkhida"
- KAZ-4530 (Photo) - prototype all wheel drive dump truck (1976)
- KAZ-4540 "Kolkhida" - dump truck (1984)
- "Object 1010"/"Object 1015B" - prototype 8x8 armored personnel carrier
- "Object 1040"/"Object 1045" - prototype 8x8 launcher for Osa SAM system; cancelled in favor of the BAZ-937

== Gallery ==
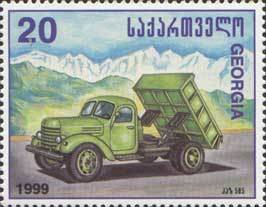
KAZ-585

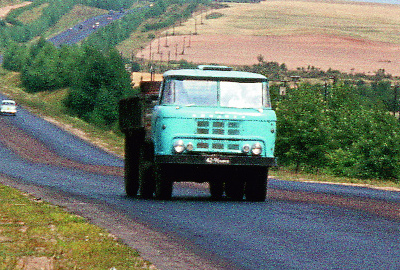
КАZ-606

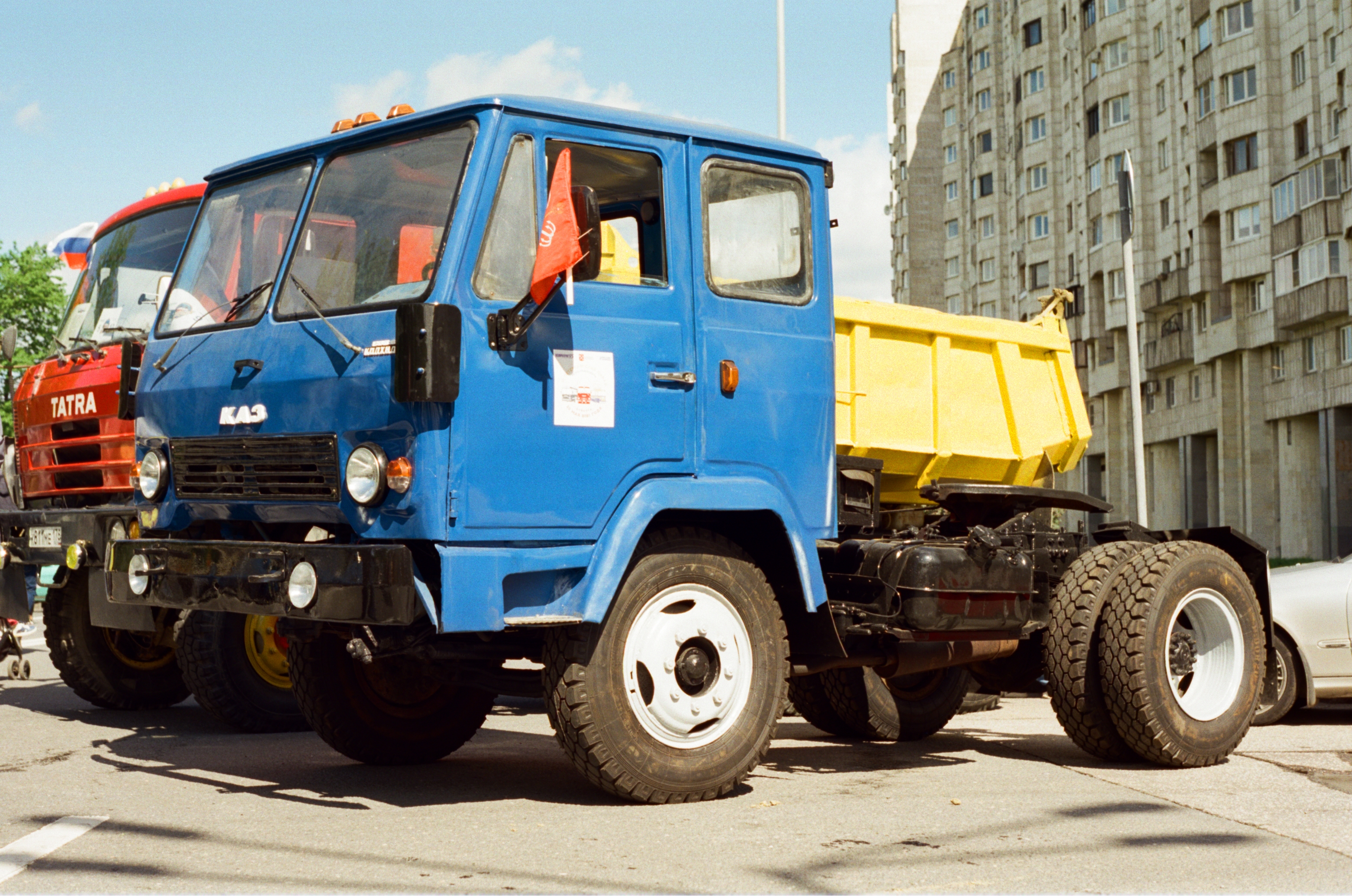
KAZ-608V

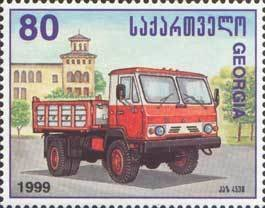
KAZ-4530

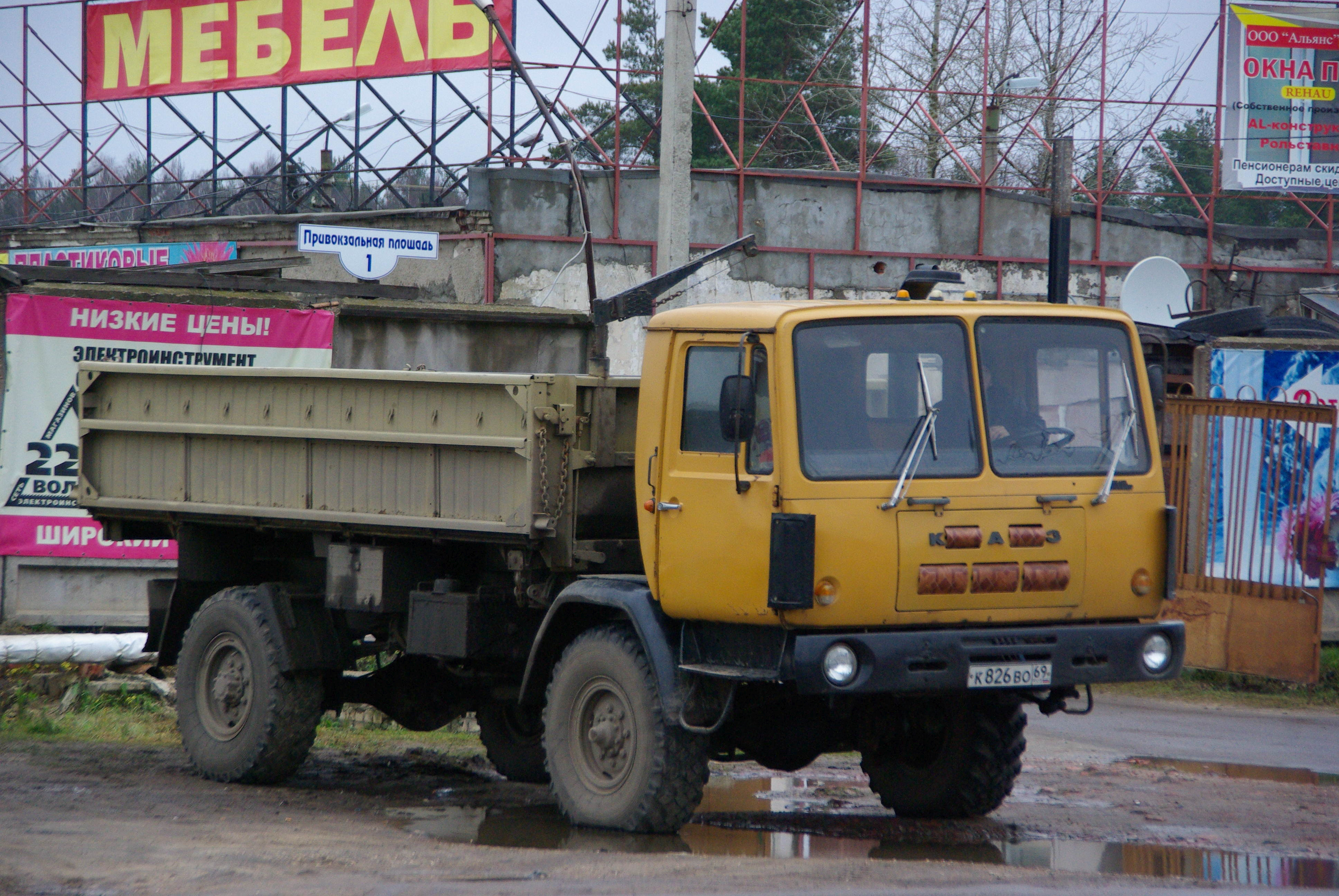
KAZ-4540
