= FAW Jiefang =

Chinese truck manufacturing company

FAW Jiefang Automotive Company, Ltd. 一汽解放汽车有限公司
- Logo used since 2023

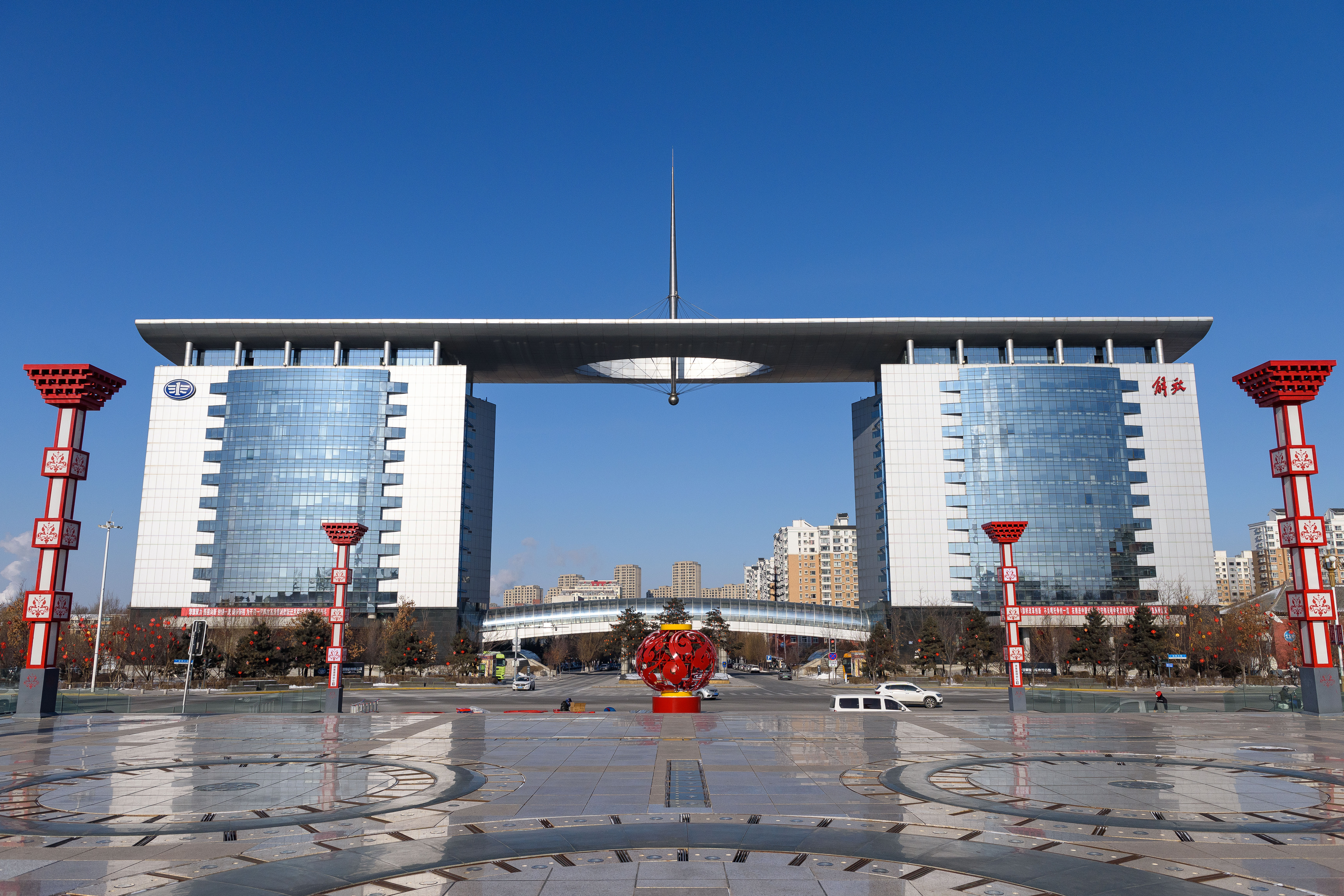
- Headquarters
- Predecessor: FAW Car Co., Ltd
- Founded: 1953; 73 years ago
- Headquarters: Changchun, Jilin, China
- Products: Trucks, engines, cars
- Production output: 200,000
- Owner: FAW Group (66%) Bestune (17.2%)
- Number of employees: 22,000
- Parent: FAW Group
- Subsidiaries: FAW Xichai (Wuxi Diesel Engine Works); Qingdao Truck Division; FAW Trading Company
- Website: www.fawjiefang.com.cn

FAW Jiefang is a truck manufacturing company headquartered in Changchun, Jilin, China, and a wholly owned subsidiary of FAW Group. It is the largest manufacturer of heavy trucks in China. FAW Jiefang was established in 2003 and has more than 22,000 employees, building more than 500 different models of 5-30 ton trucks. It has an annual production capacity of around 200,000 vehicles.

== History ==
FAW Jiefang began as the FAW Car Co., Ltd, with its founding in 1953. The first truck rolled off of the lines in 1956. The technology came by way of Russia (Soviet Union).

In December 2020, FAW Group announced the restructure of FAW Bestune and FAW Jiefang. The Bestune was transferred from FAW Car to FAW Corporation Limited (FAW Group) and will operated independently as a wholly owned subsidiary of FAW Group. FAW Jiefang was set to listed in the capital market.

In December 2022, the FAW Group announced the transfer of 17.02% FAW Jiefang share to Bestune, providing financial support to Bestune.

On October 24, 2023, FAW and Huawei stepped up their strategic partnership by signing a MoU that involves the cooperation in such fields as AI, intelligent driving, and intelligent cockpit.

== Subsidiaries and divisions ==
FAW Jiefang is made up of other subsidiaries and divisions.

=== Qingdao Truck Division ===
The Qingdao Truck Division, located in Qingdao, China, merged into FAW Group in 1993, and later was assigned to the FAW Jiefang company. This subsidiary has 2,900 employees, and produces over 70,000 units per year.

=== WuXi Diesel Engine Works (FAWDE) ===
The WuXi Diesel Engine Works Division (also known as FAWDE), located in Wuxi, Jiangsu, has 4,000 employees and produces diesel engines for generator sets, water pumps, forklifts, farm equipment, and trucks. They were formed in 1943 and became part of the FAW Group in 1992. They produce 150,000 diesel engines annually.

=== Deutz (Dalian) Engine ===
The Deutz (Dalian) Engine joint venture is managed through the FAW Jiefang subsidiary.

== Models ==
=== Passenger vehicles (discontinued) ===
- Jiefang Lubao CA6400UA (陆豹), a hatchback based on the Austin Maestro.
- Jiefang CA6440UA, a light commercial van based on the Austin Maestro van.
- Jiefeng CA6440, a passenger/commercial van based on the E24 Nissan Caravan.
- Jiefang Saibao CA6460/6480 (赛宝), a series of all-terrain vehicles based on the Isuzu D-Max.
- Jiefang Jiabao CA6350, a microvan.
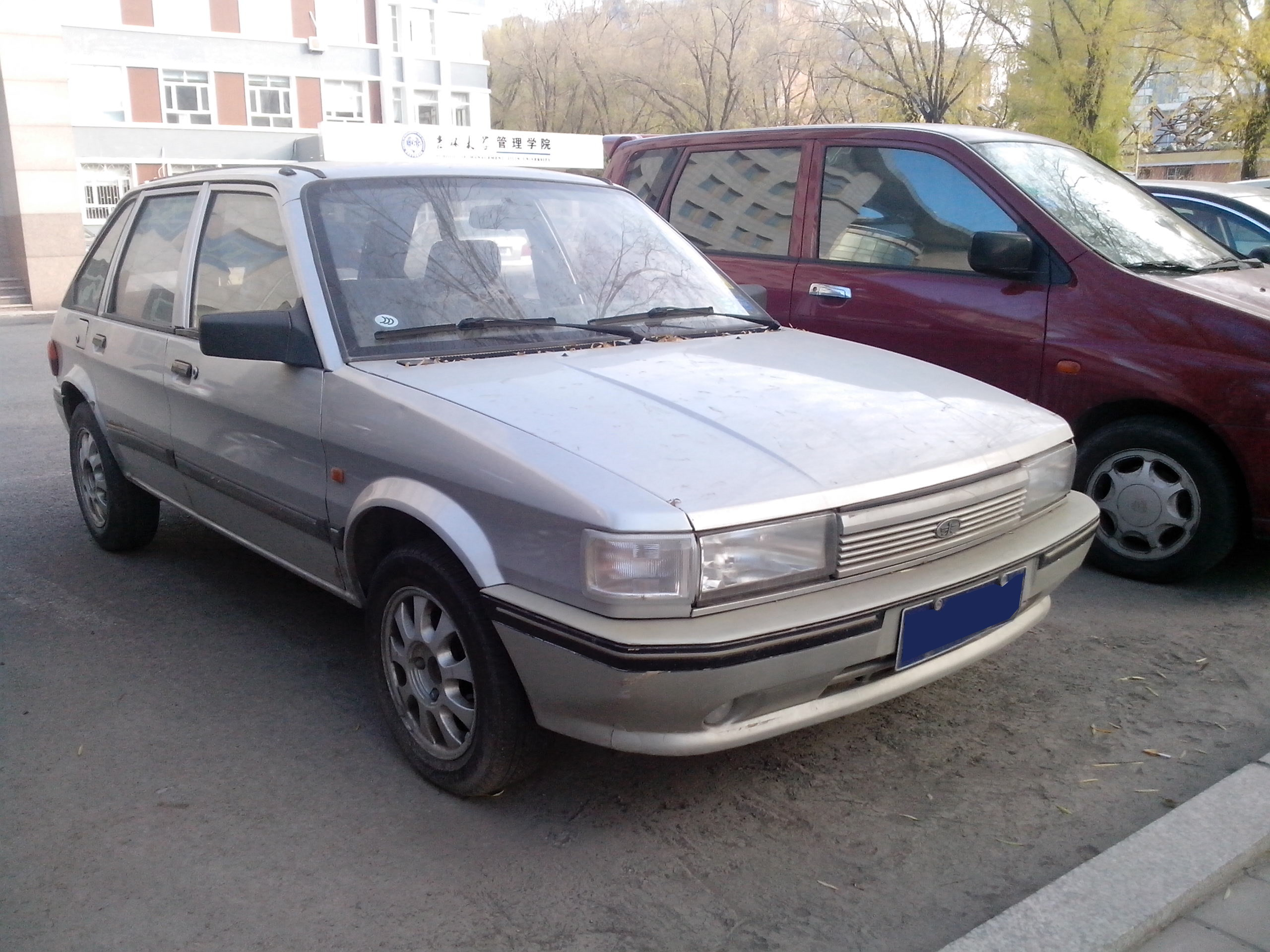
Jiefang Lubao CA6400UA (陆豹)

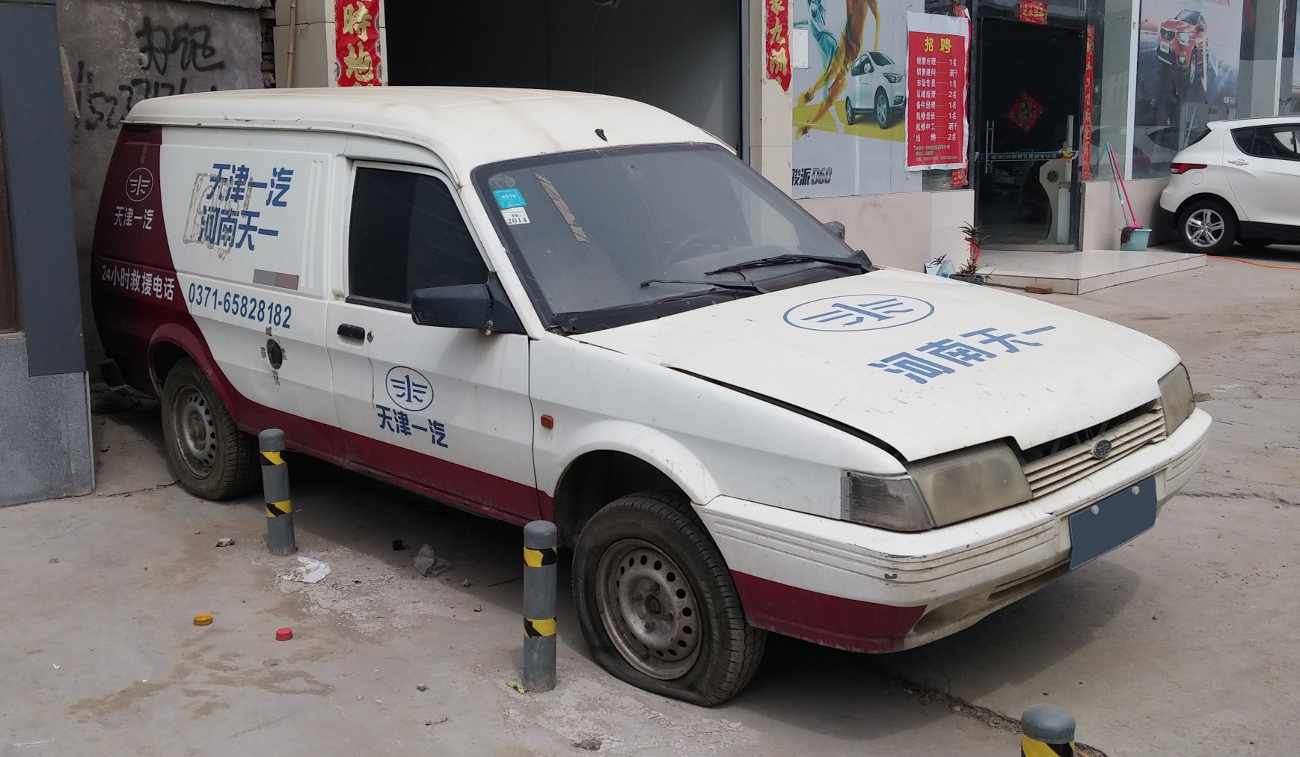
Jiefang CA6440UA panel van

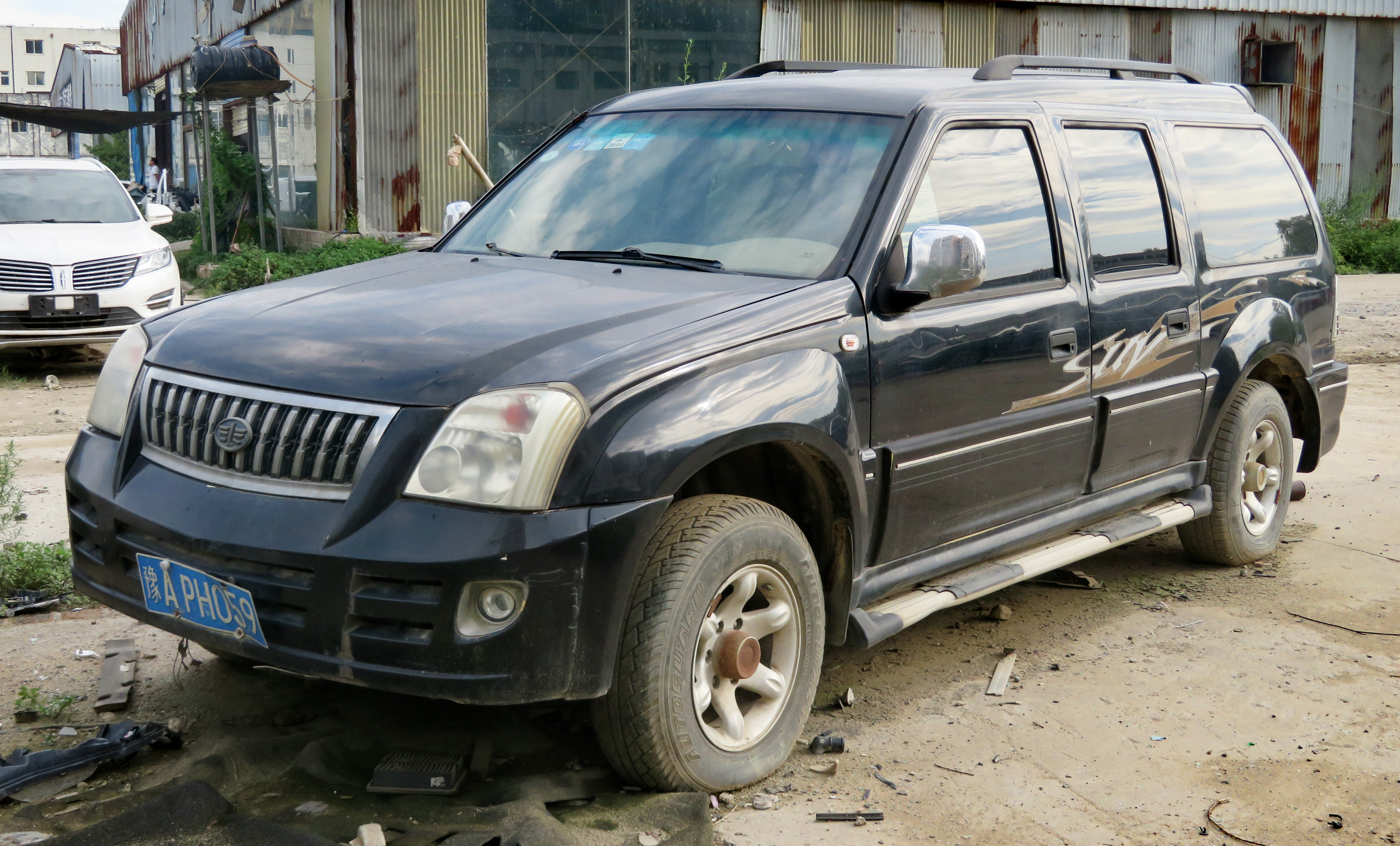
Jiefang Saibao CA6480

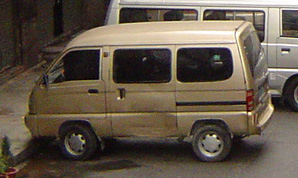
Jiefang Jiabao CA6350

=== Heavy duty trucks ===
Trucks available in 6x2, 6x4 and 4x2 configurations.

- Jiefang J4R (2002–present)
- Jiefang J5K (2004–present)
- Jiefang HAN V (2021–present)
- Jiefang J6L (2010–present)
- Jiefang J6M (2007–present)
- Jiefang J6V (2022–present)
- Jiefang J7 (2023–present)
- Jiefang JH6 (2014–present)
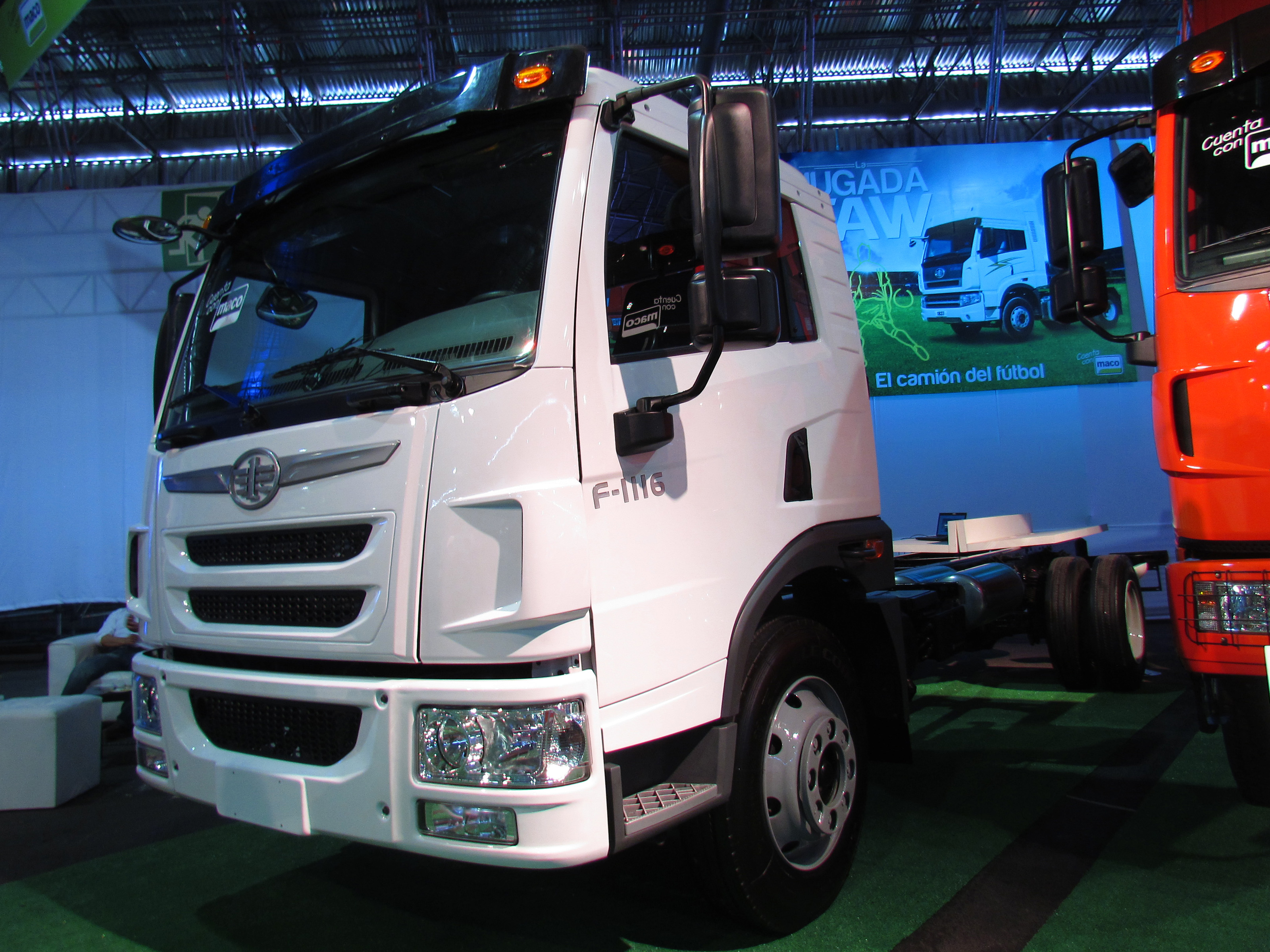
FAW Jiefang F-1116

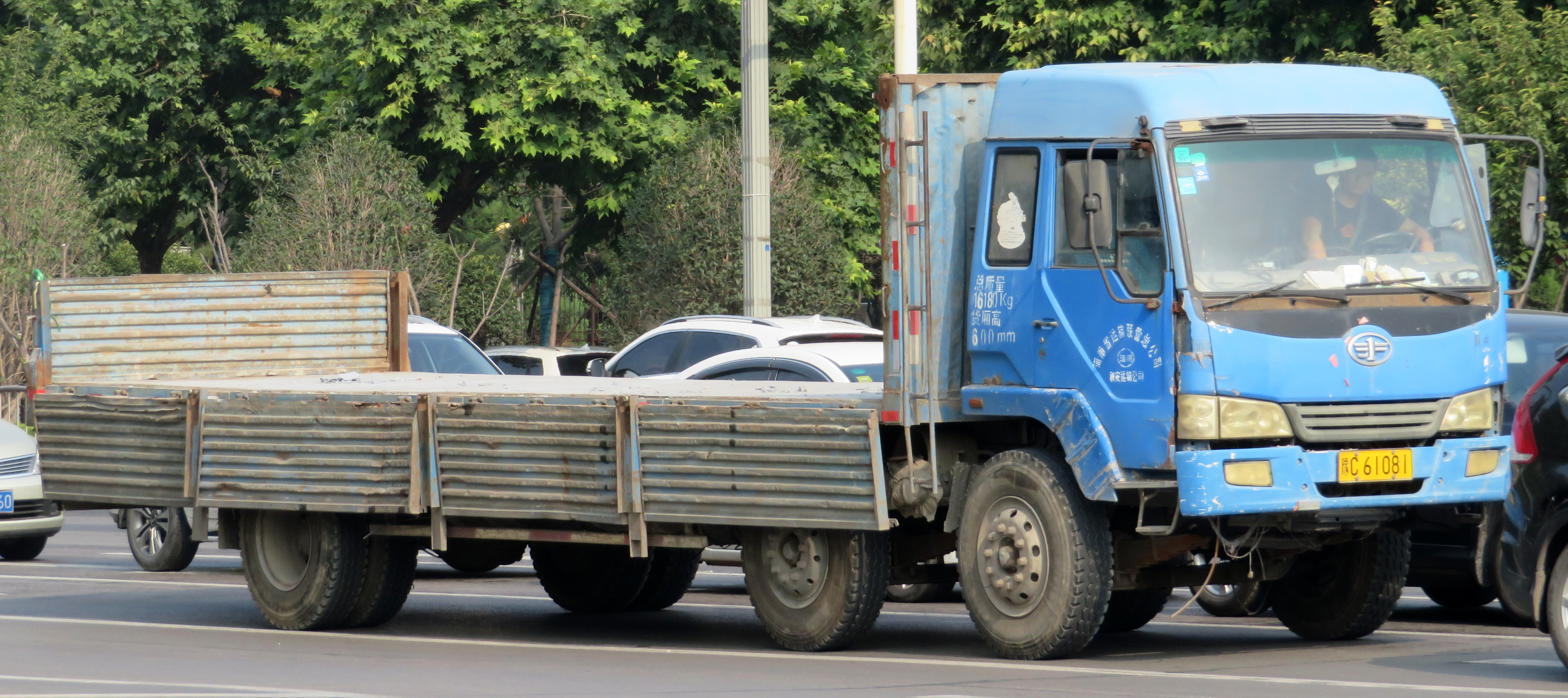
FAW Jiefang J4K

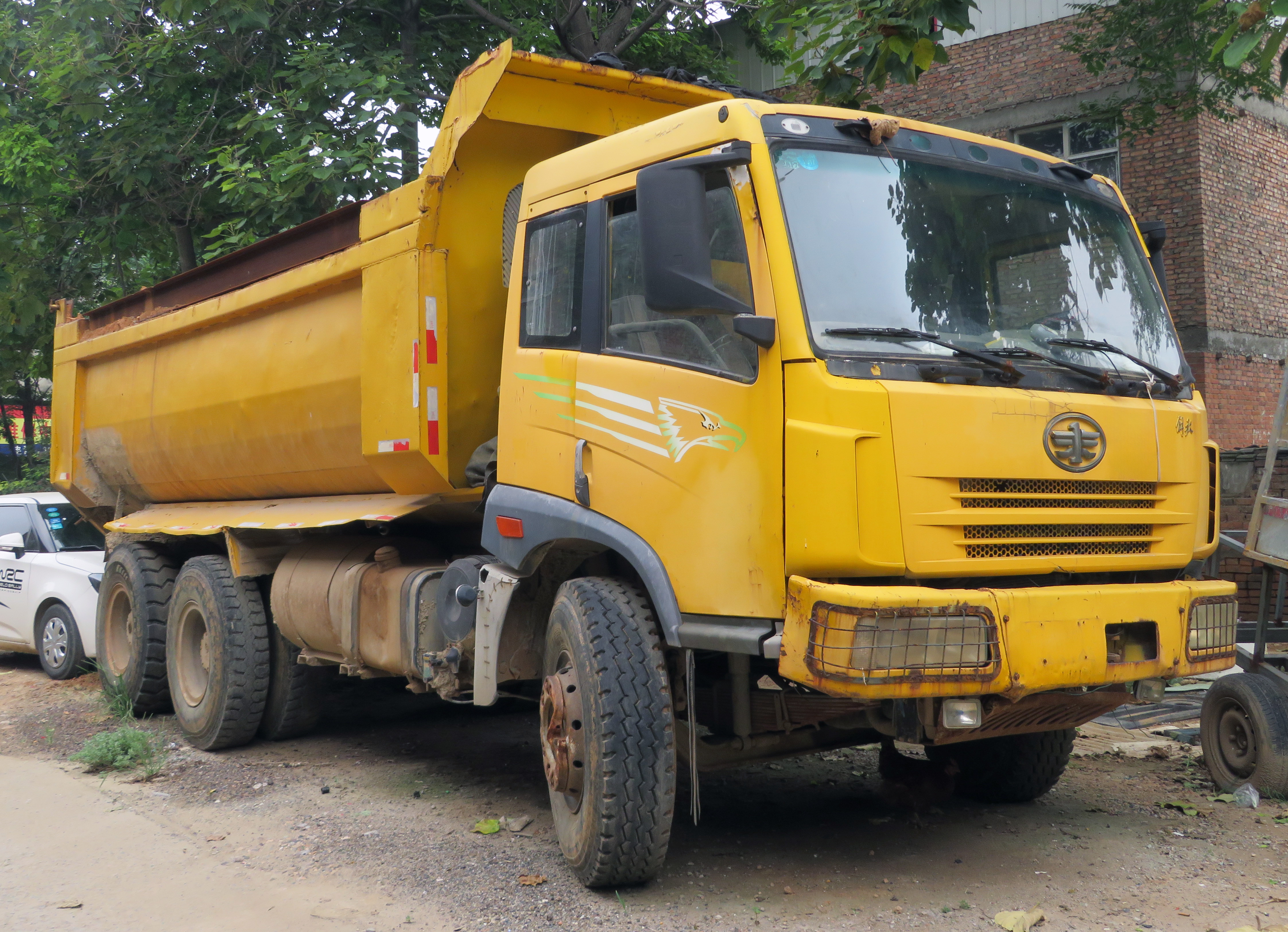
FAW Jiefang J5P

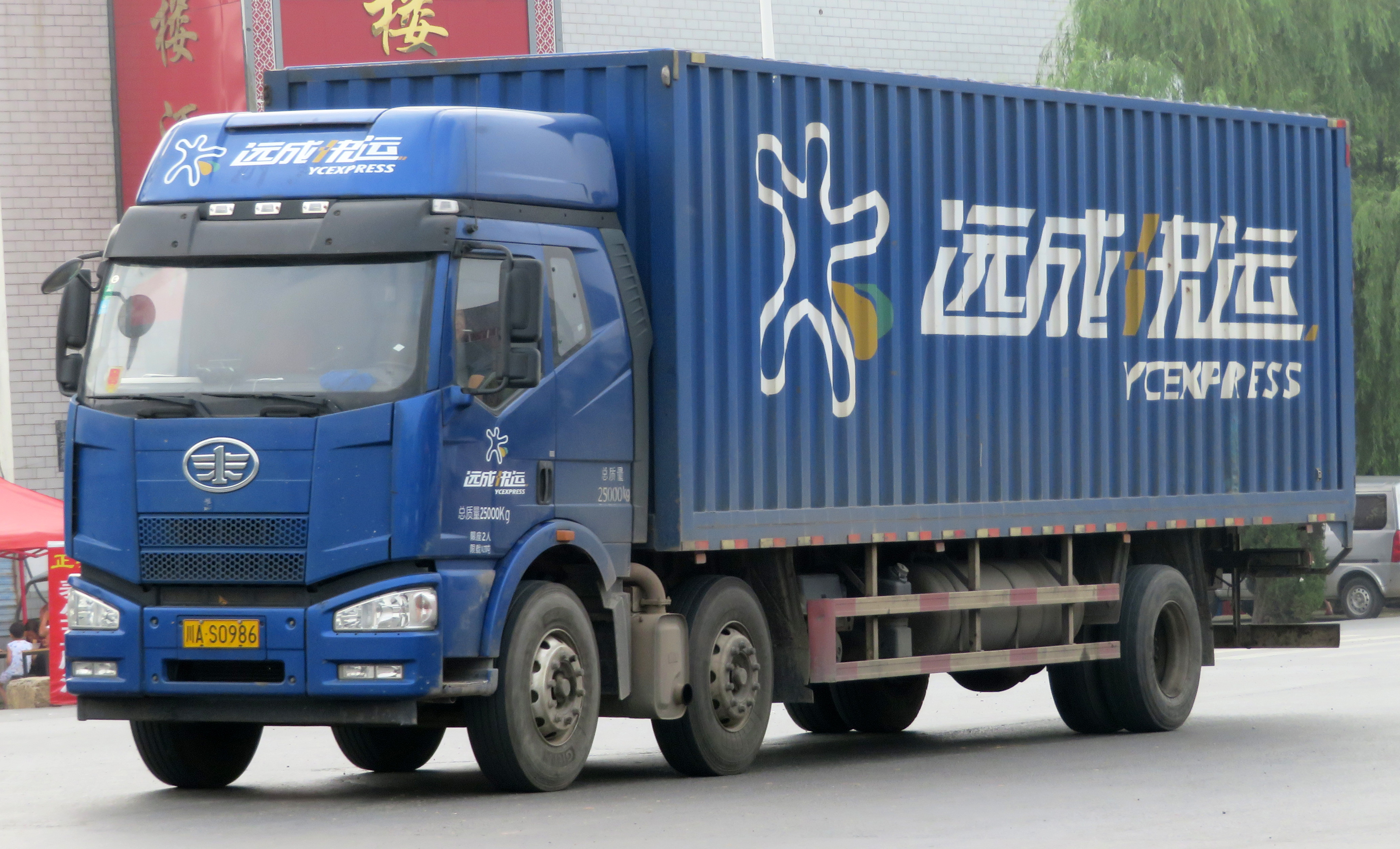
FAW Jiefang J6

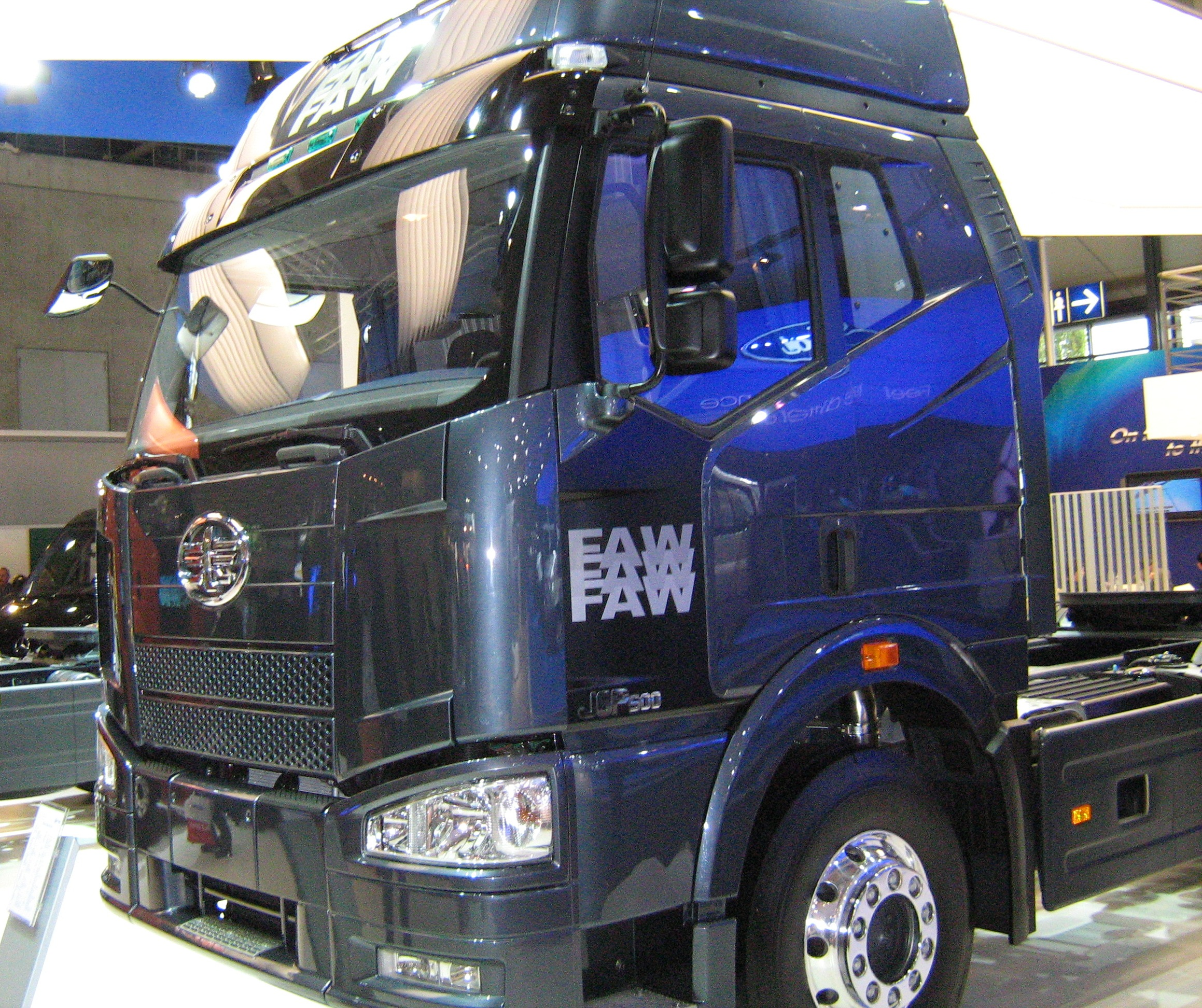
FAW Jiefang J6P

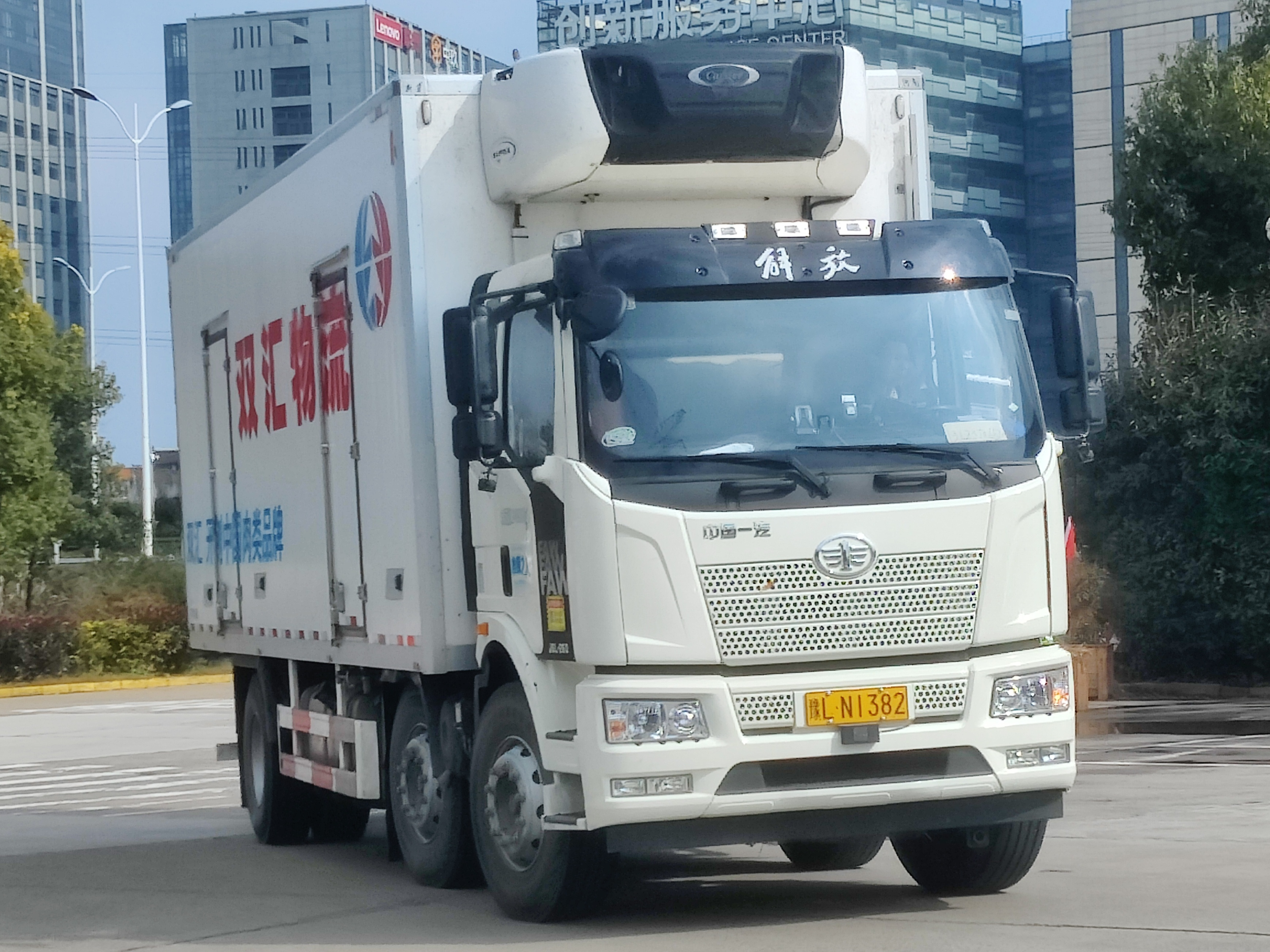
FAW Jiefang J6L

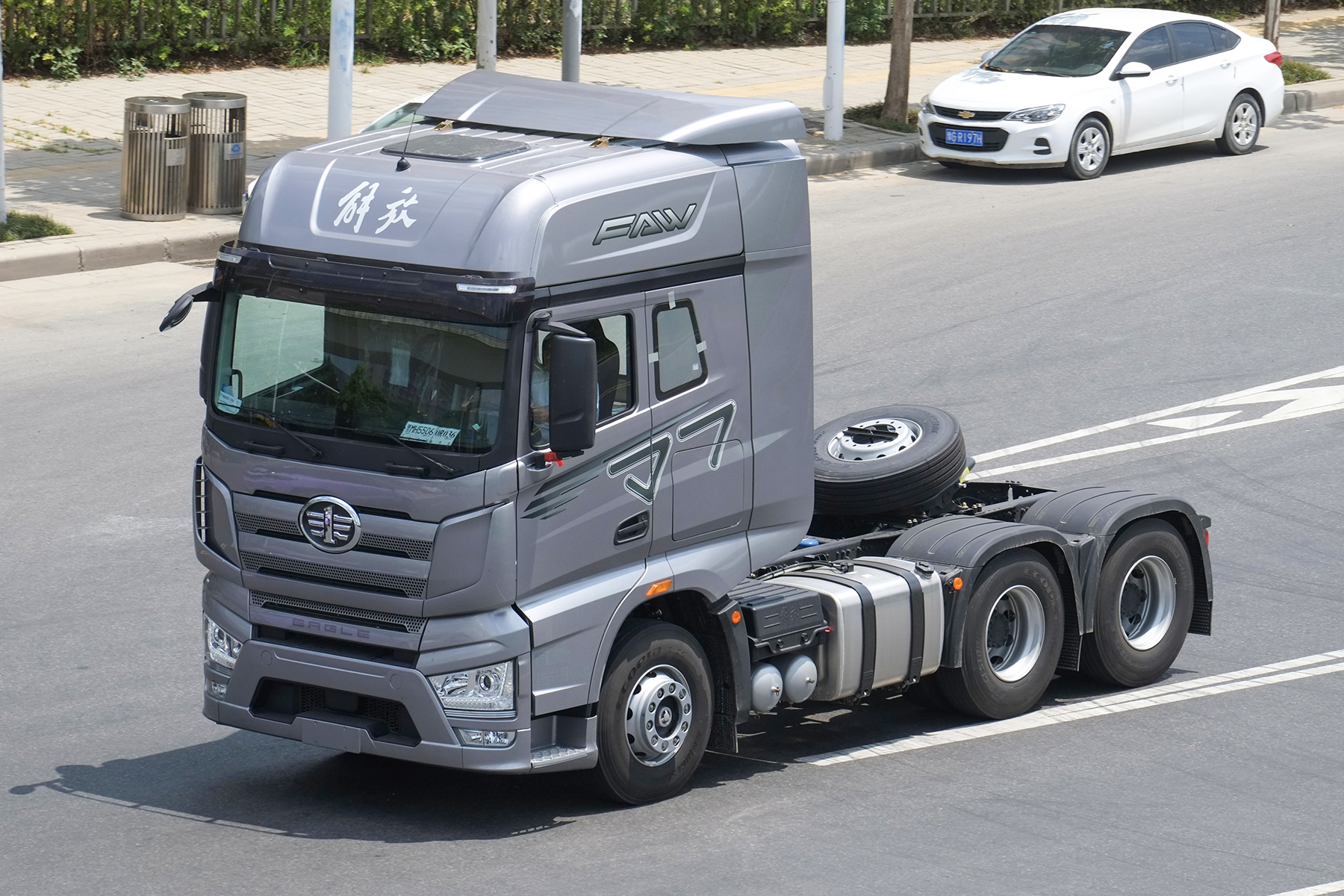
FAW Jiefang J7

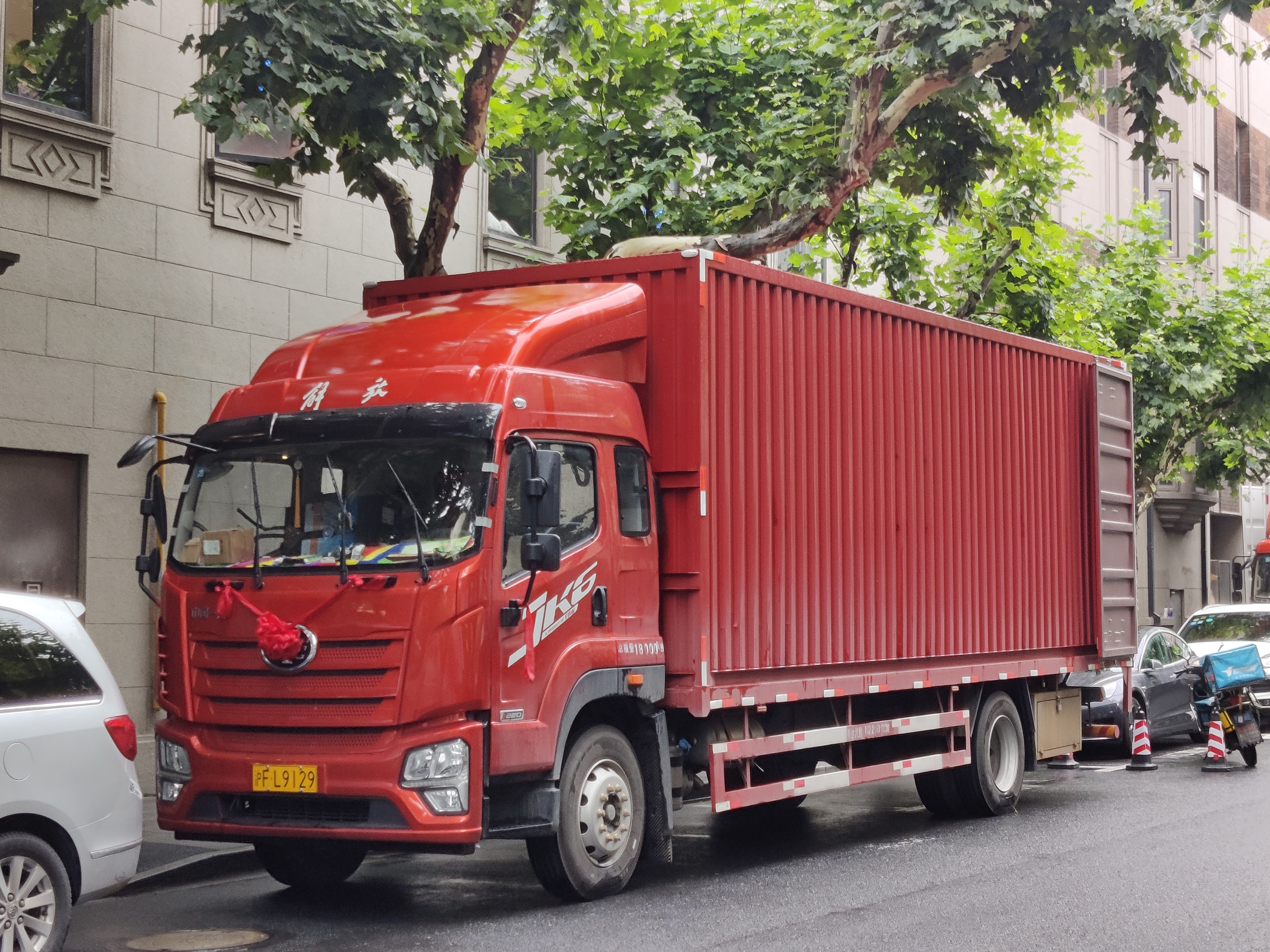
FAW Jiefang JK6

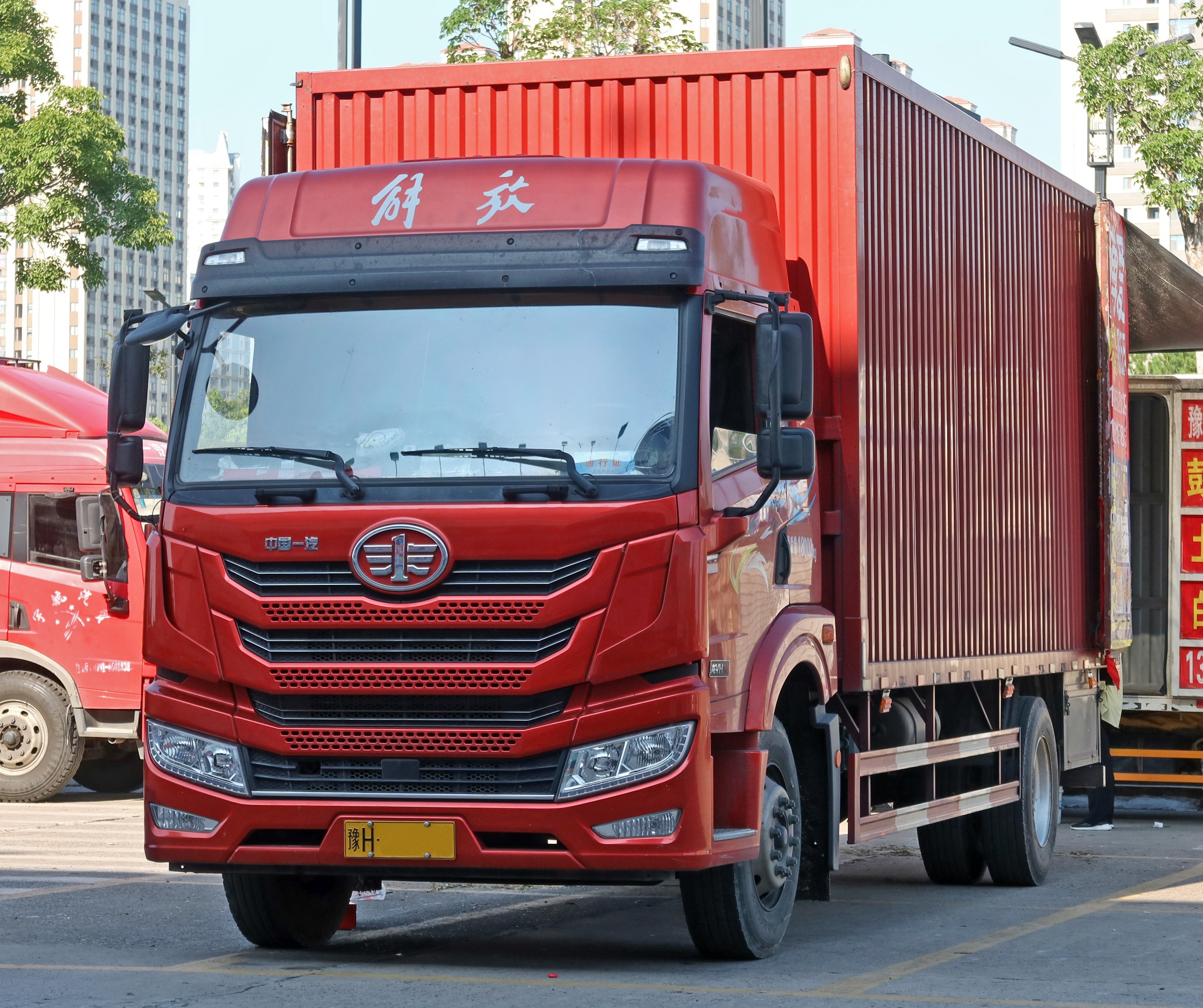
FAW Jiefang Dragon V

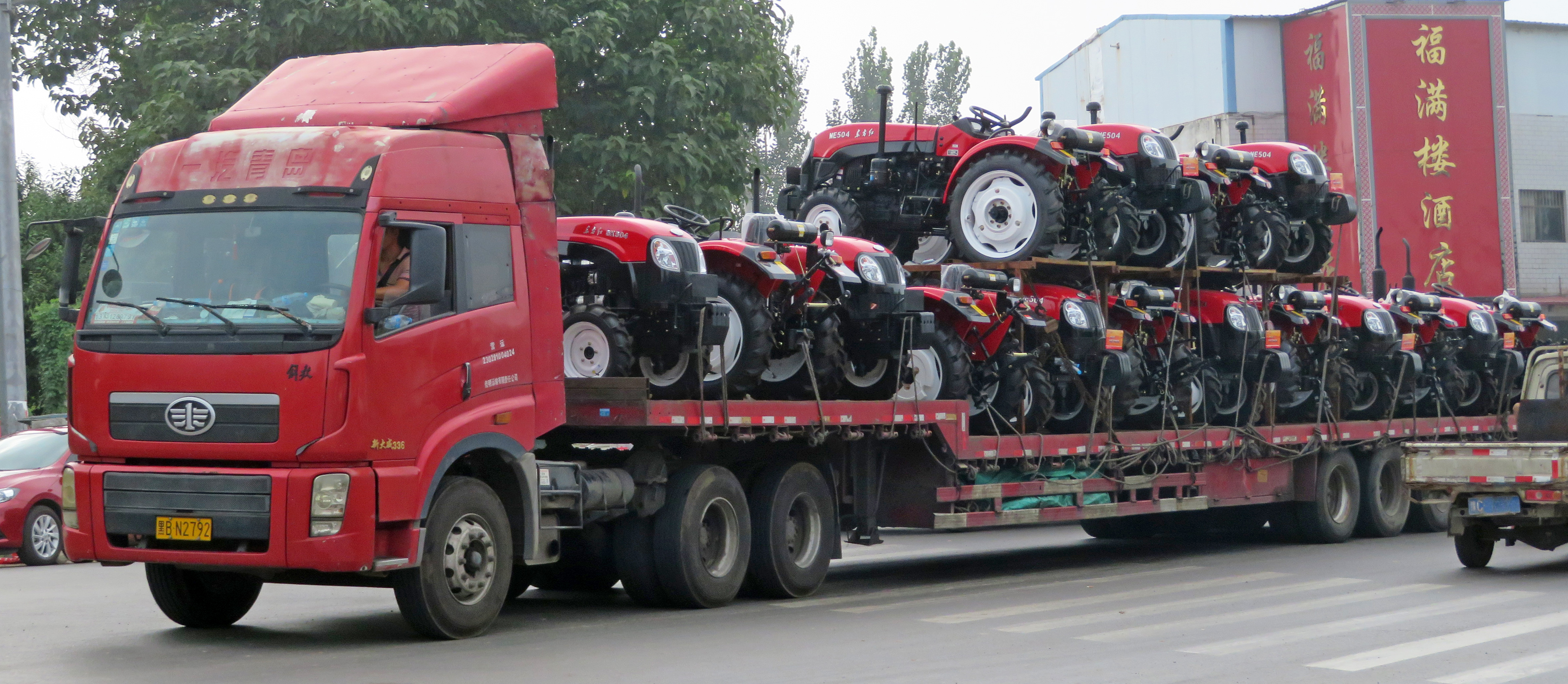
FAW Jiefang Xindawei

=== Light commercial trucks ===
- Jiefang T80/T90
- Jiefang Hu V (Tiger V)
- Jiefang J6F
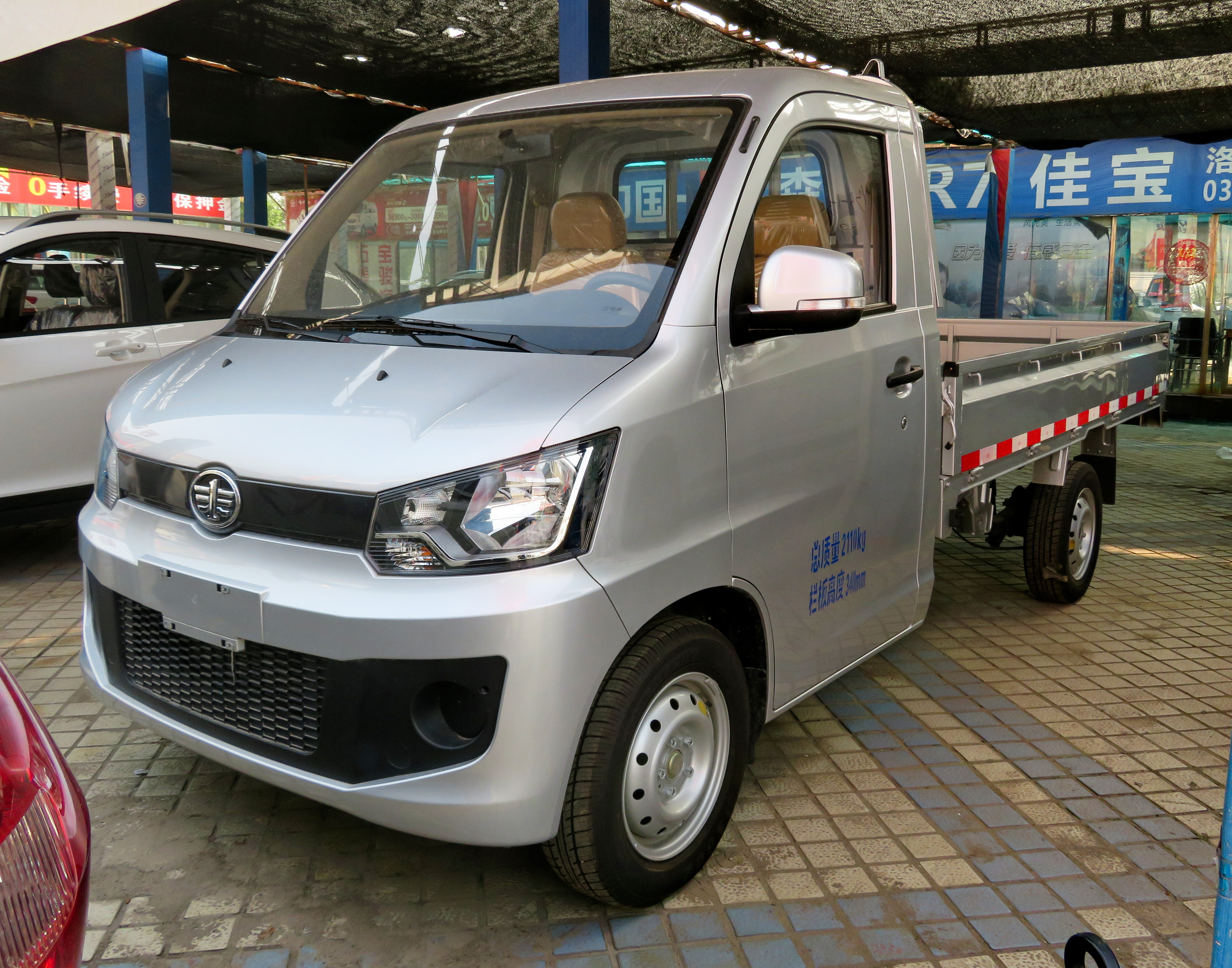
FAW Jiefang T80

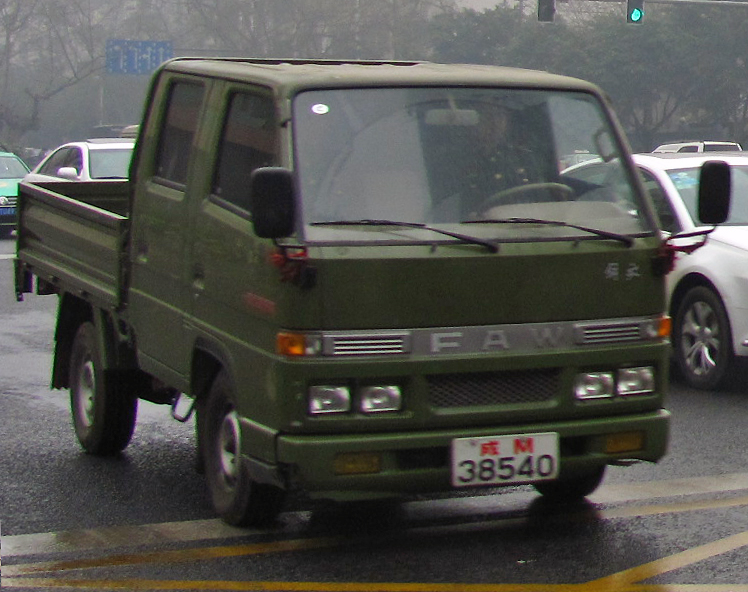
FAW Jiefang CA1020

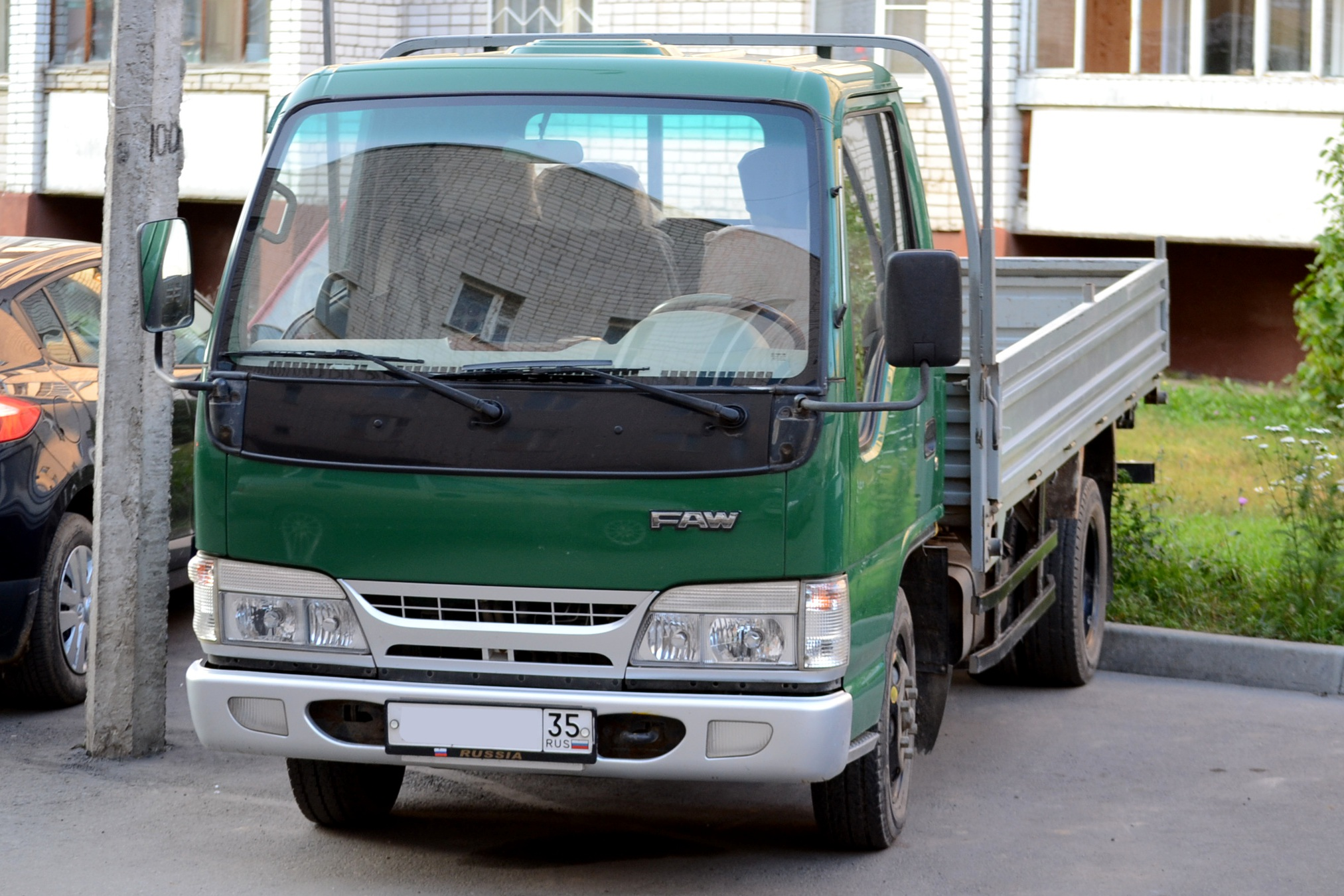
FAW Jiefang CA1031

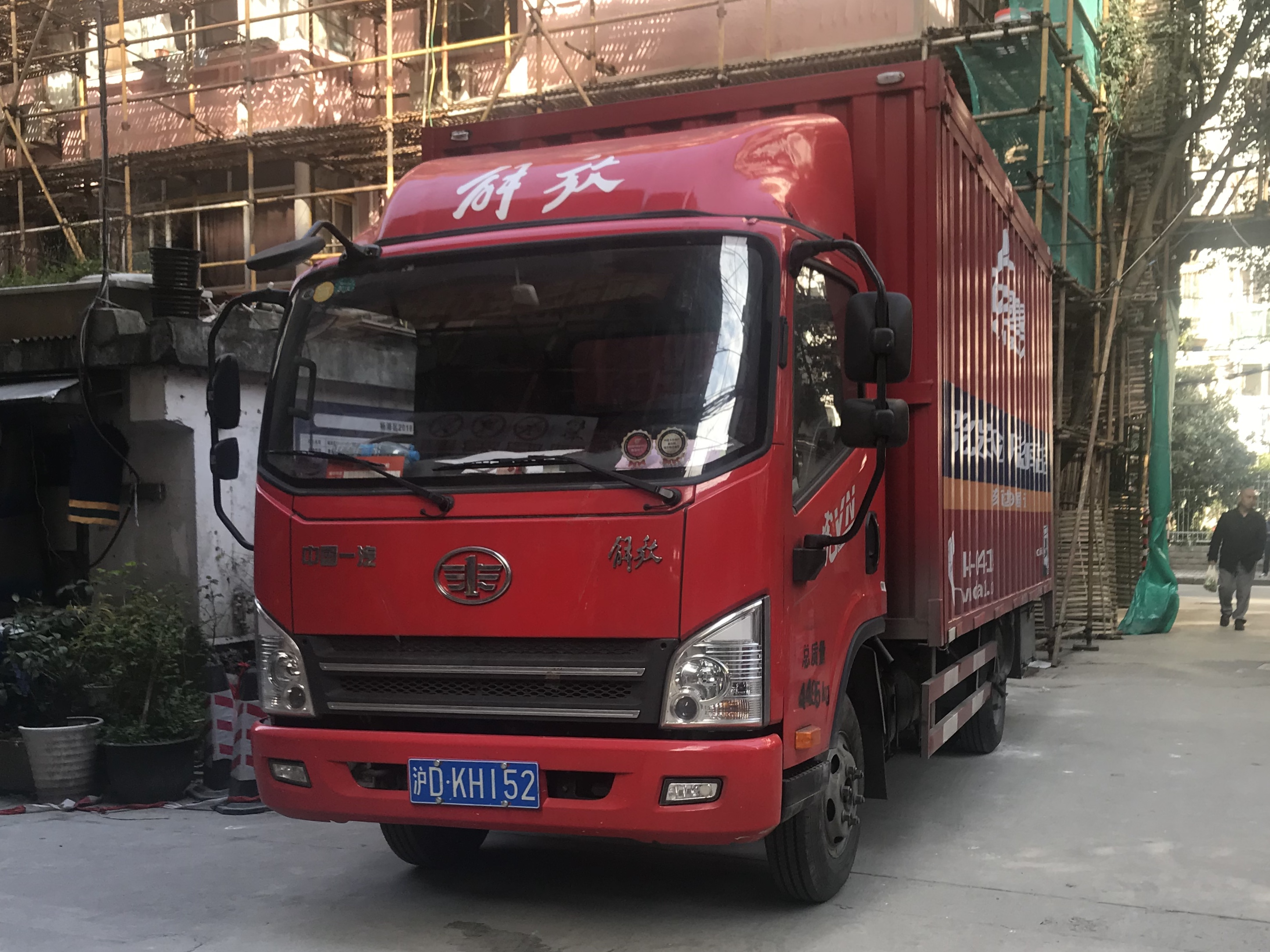
FAW Jiefang Hu V (Tiger V)

=== Military use vehicles ===
- Jiefang MV3
- Jiefang CA-10 - 1956–1986, licensed copy of ZIS-150
- Jiefang CA-30 - 1958–1986, licensed copy of ZIL-157
- Jiefang CA220

The FAW Jiefang CA141/CA1091 is a five tonne capacity, 4x2 troop/cargo carrier truck developed and built by First Automotive Works and used by the People's Liberation Army of the People's Republic of China for transport. It entered service in 1980s along with Soviet GAZ-53 and ZIL-130 to replace the older Yuejin NJ130 (the copied version of the 2.5 ton Soviet GAZ-51) and Jiefang CA10 (the copied version of the 4 tonne Soviet ZIS-150).

== See also ==
- Automobile manufacturers and brands of China
- List of automobile manufacturers of China
