= Toyota Motor Corporation Tahara plant =

Automobile plant in Tahara, Aichi Prefecture, Japan

Coordinates: 34°42′58″N 137°17′31.19″E

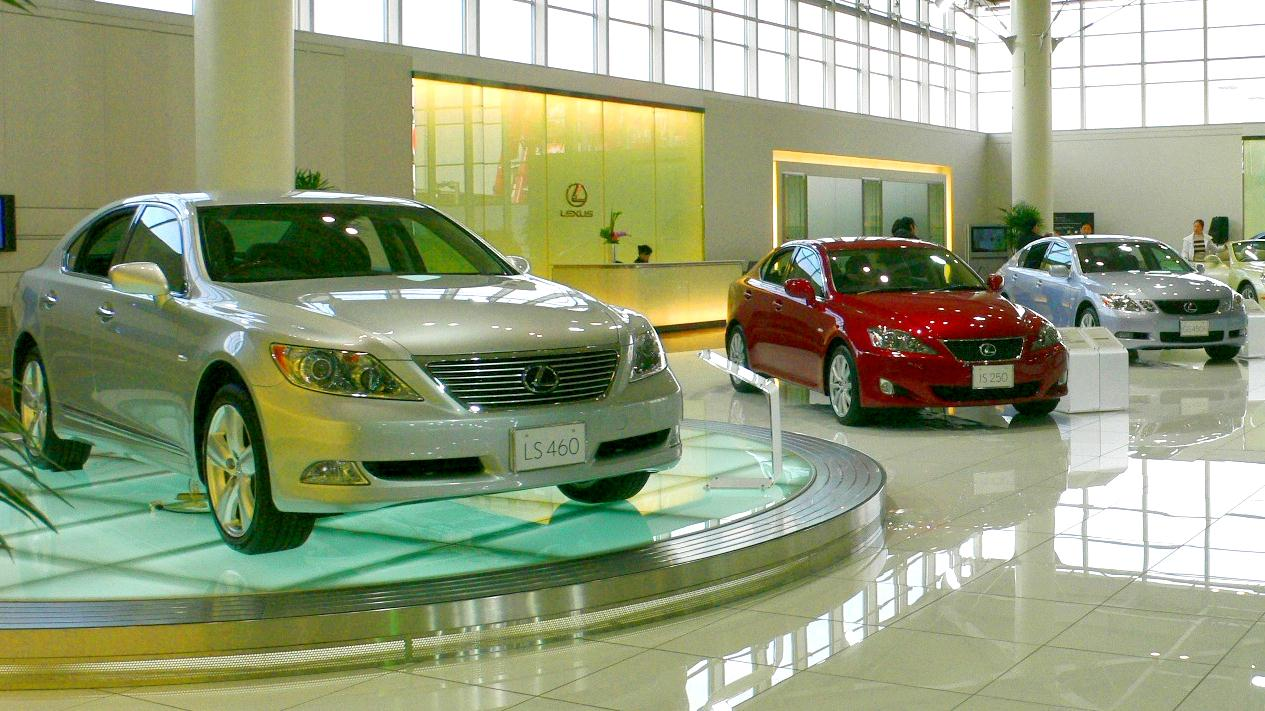
Lexus LS, IS, and GS are made in Tahara

The Tahara plant (Japanese: 田原工場, Hepburn: Tahara kōjō) is an automobile plant in Tahara, Aichi, Japan owned by Toyota Motor Corporation. The address is 3–1 Midorigahama, Tahara City, Aichi Prefecture.

== History ==
The Tahara plant began vehicle production in January 1979. The plant was built on reclaimed land, and the site currently spans 4.03 million square meters.

It is the most computerized and robotized automotive plant in the world and produces Lexus brand vehicles, including the Lexus IS, Lexus GS, Lexus LS, Lexus GX, Lexus RC, and Lexus LX, Lexus NX, Lexus LM models. Several Toyota vehicles have been assembled there as well, including the Crown Majesta, Ipsum, Crown, Celica, Land Cruiser, Land Cruiser Prado, RAV4/Vanguard, 4Runner and the ultra-luxury Century SUV. The plant also manufactures engines, including their V8 engines, one of only two Toyota plants globally which manufactures such engine types. Current Toyota vehicles being produced at the Tahara plant are the following: Toyota 4Runner.

Employees look through 4,000 details for every car produced. The plant creates a Lexus every 87 seconds, equal to 675 Lexus models per day. When employees enter the factory floor, they pass through an air shower to remove dust. They are required to exercise and perform other physical activities such as holding and rolling golf balls in their palms. These motor exercises keep staff sharp, and Toyota believes these behaviors are essential to help retain the standards necessary to produce flawless vehicles.

The New York Times columnist Thomas Friedman visited the plant in the early 1990s, and described the experience as an example of globalization in his best-selling 1999 book, The Lexus and the Olive Tree. In his book, Friedman detailed the precise installation of windshield rubber seals by the factory's robots, along with human quality controls.

== See also ==
- List of Toyota manufacturing facilities § Japan
