= Hongqi H7 =

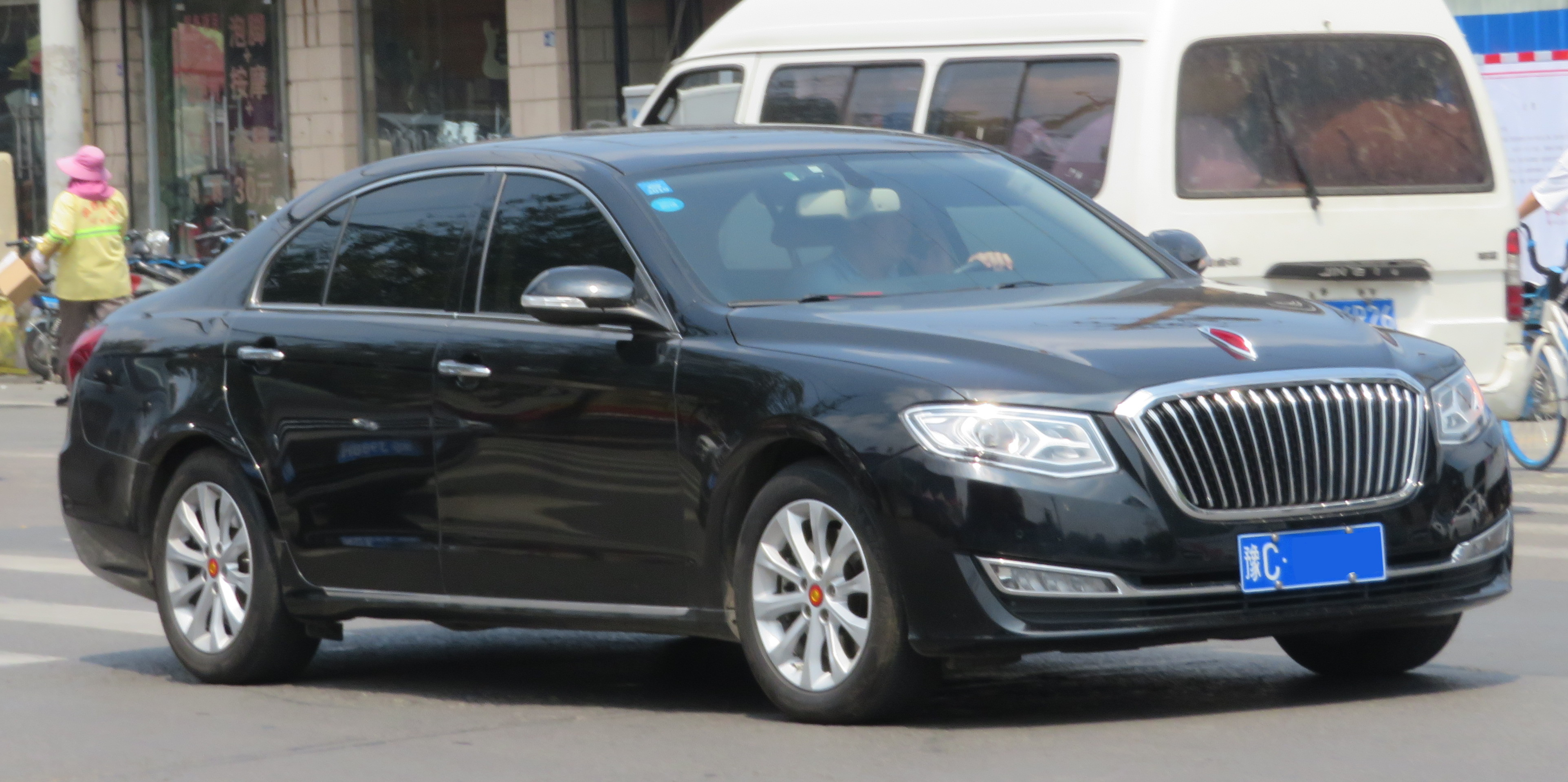

Overview
- Manufacturer: Hongqi (FAW Group)
- Production: 2013–2021; 2026–present

Body and chassis
- Class: Executive car (E)
- Body style: 4-door Sedan

The Hongqi H7 is a executive sedan produced by Chinese automobile manufacturer Hongqi, a subsidiary of FAW Group. It is the successor to the Hongqi HQ3 built between 2006 and 2010.

== First generation (2013–2021) ==
First generation
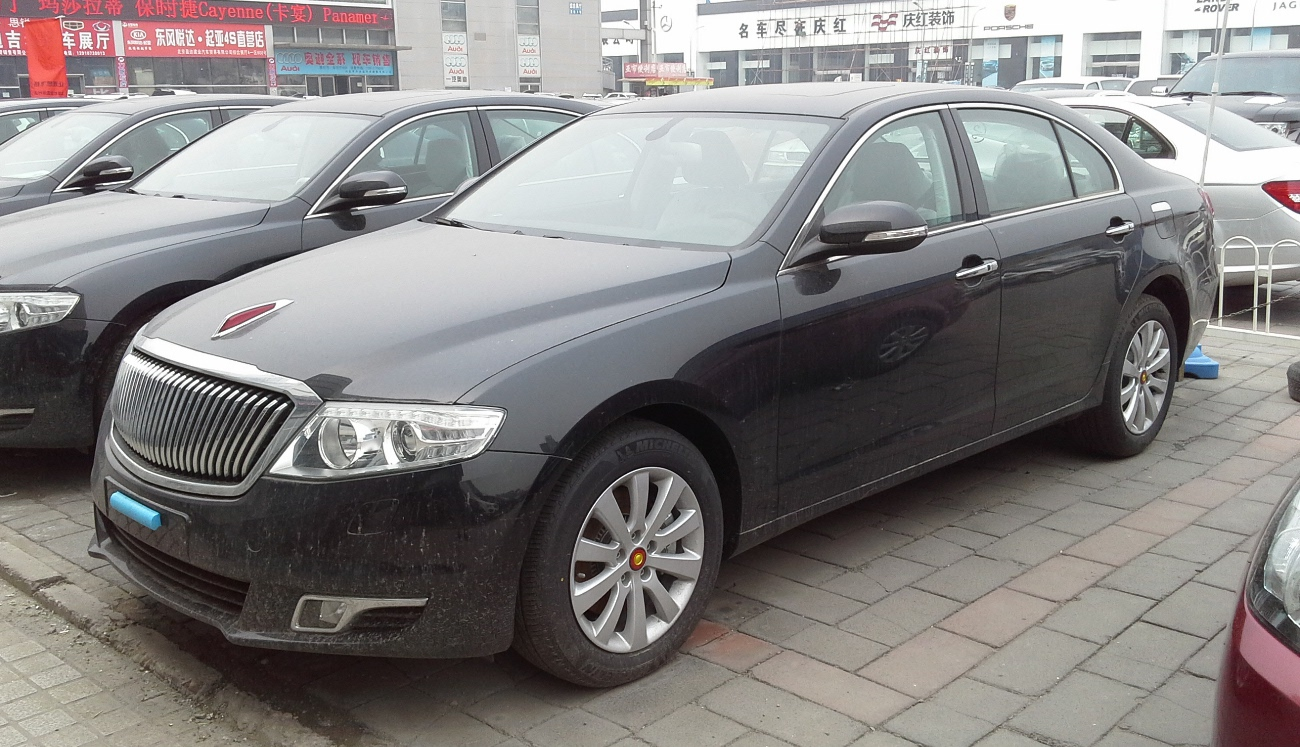

Overview
- Production: 2013–2021
- Assembly: China: Changchun, Jilin

Body and chassis
- Class: Executive car (E)
- Body style: 4-door sedan
- Layout: Front-engine, rear-wheel-drive

Powertrain
- Engine: Petrol: 1.8 L CA4GC18T-01 turbo I4 (2015–2021); 2.0 L CA4G20T turbo I4; 3.0 L CA6GV1 V6 (2013–2020)
- Power output: 138 kW (185 hp; 188 PS) (1.8 L; 2015–2021); 152 kW (204 hp; 207 PS) (2.0 L); 170 kW (228 hp; 231 PS) (3.0 L; 2013–2020)
- Transmission: 6-speed automatic

Dimensions
- Wheelbase: 2,970 mm (116.9 in)
- Length: 5,095 mm (200.6 in)
- Width: 1,875 mm (73.8 in)
- Height: 1,485 mm (58.5 in)
- Kerb weight: 1,800–1,805 kg (3,968–3,979 lb)

Chronology
- Predecessor: Hongqi Shengshi
- Successor: Hongqi H7 (second generation); Hongqi EH7 (Electric version)

The first generation H7 was first presented to the public at the Beijing Motor Show in April 2012, and officially went on sale at the end of May 2013. The first 500 Hongqi H7 vehicles had been sold before launch to the Chinese government.

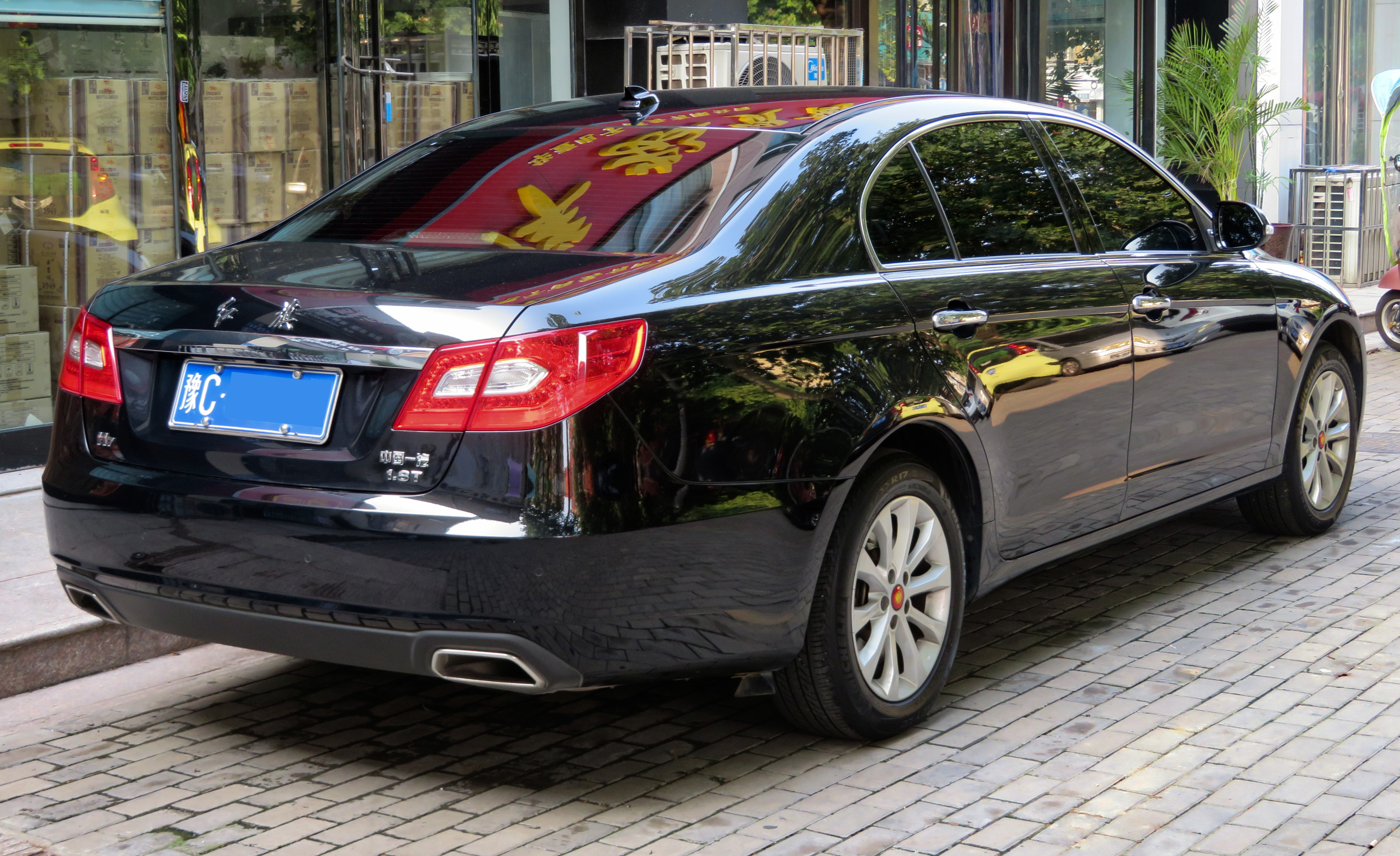
Rear view

=== 2016 facelift ===
At the Beijing Motor Show 2016, Hongqi presented a revised version of the H7. In addition, a plug-in hybrid version was presented.

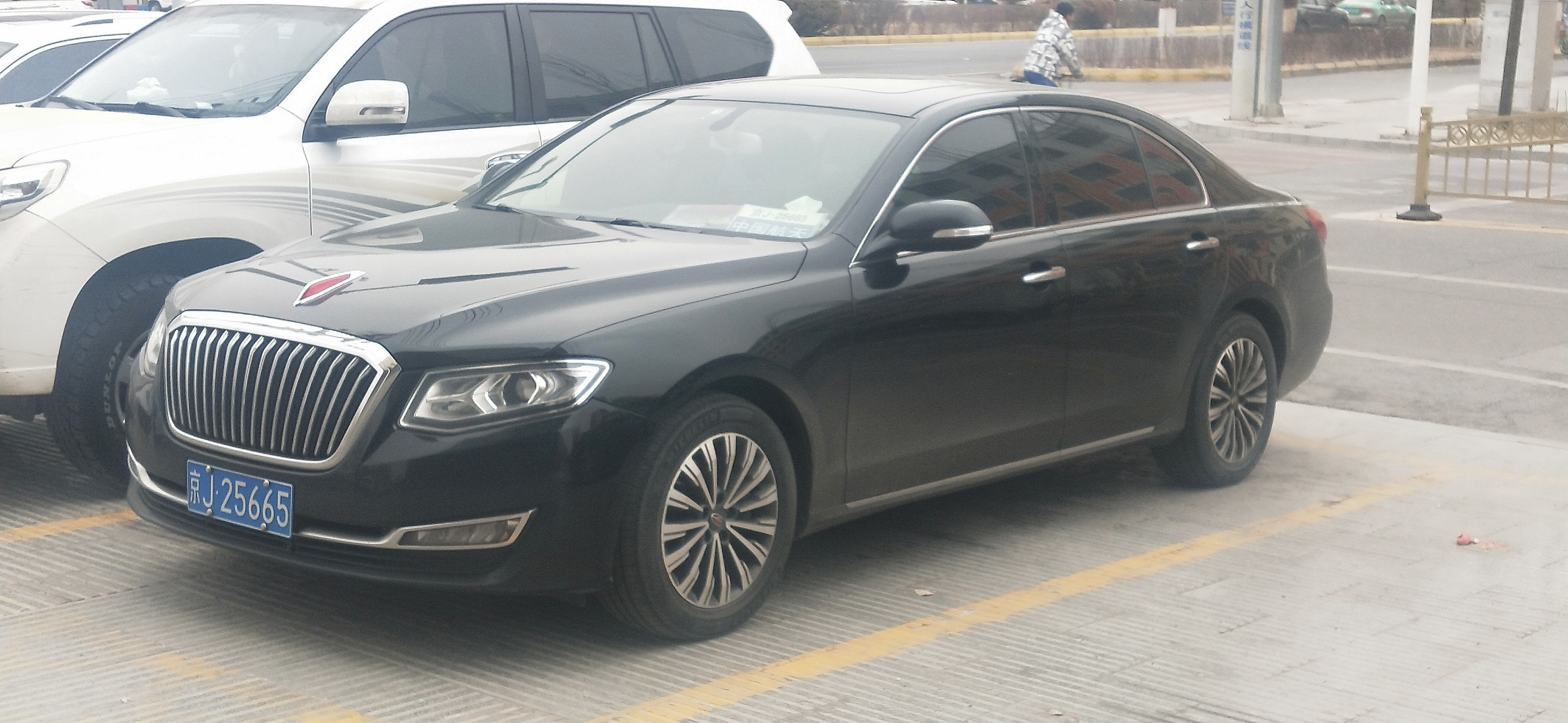
Hongqi H7 (facelift)

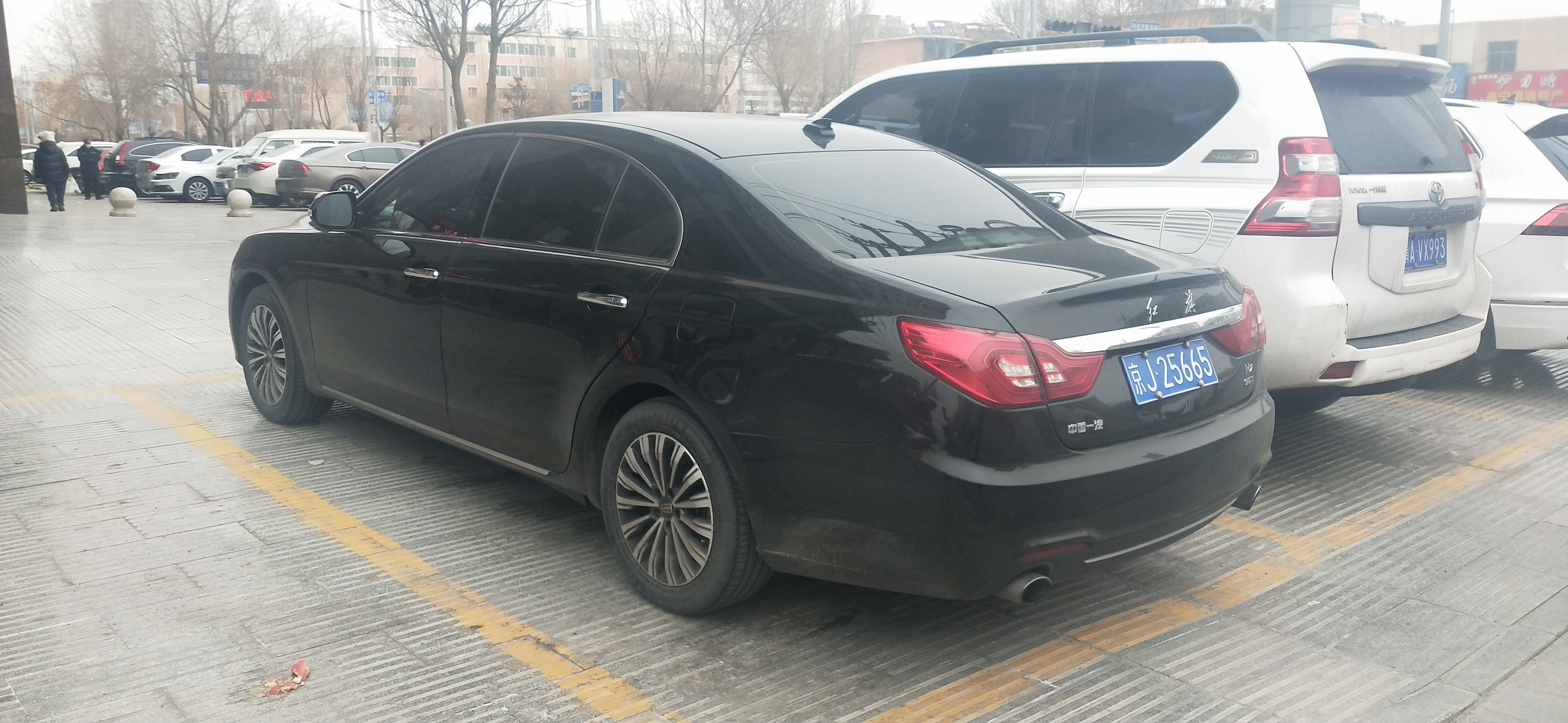
Rear view

News of a second generation model surfaced in 2019. However, the actual model launched later was named the Hongqi H9 which was more upmarket and sold alongside the H7.

== Second generation (2026–present) ==
Second generation

Overview
- Production: 2026–present
- Assembly: China: Changchun, Jilin

Body and chassis
- Class: Executive car (E)
- Body style: 4-door sedan
- Layout: Front-engine, front-wheel-drive

Powertrain
- Engine: Petrol plug-in hybrid: 1.5 L CA4GB15TDH-36 turbo I4
- Transmission: 1-speed DHT
- Battery: 23.9 kWh LFP CANE; 30.3 kWh NMC Zenergy
- Electric range: 151–191 km (94–119 mi) (WLTP); 180–240 km (112–149 mi) (CLTC)
- Plug-in charging: DC: 100–115 kW

Dimensions
- Wheelbase: 2,970 mm (116.9 in)
- Length: 5,060 mm (199.2 in)
- Width: 1,910 mm (75.2 in)
- Height: 1,480 mm (58.3 in)
- Kerb weight: 1,800–1,805 kg (3,968–3,979 lb)

Chronology
- Predecessor: Hongqi H7 (first generation)

The second generation H7 was unveiled on 24 April 2026 at the Beijing Auto Show. The powertrain is a plug-in hybrid with a 1.5 liter turbo engine developing 110kW.

It has a 15.6-inch 2.5K-resolution central infotainment touchscreen and a 30-inch AR-HUD both powered by a Qualcomm Snapdragon 8295P SoC.

It is equipped with a Level 2 ADAS system powered by one mmWave radar and a 10-camera array and is capable of urban and highway assisted driving.

Rear view

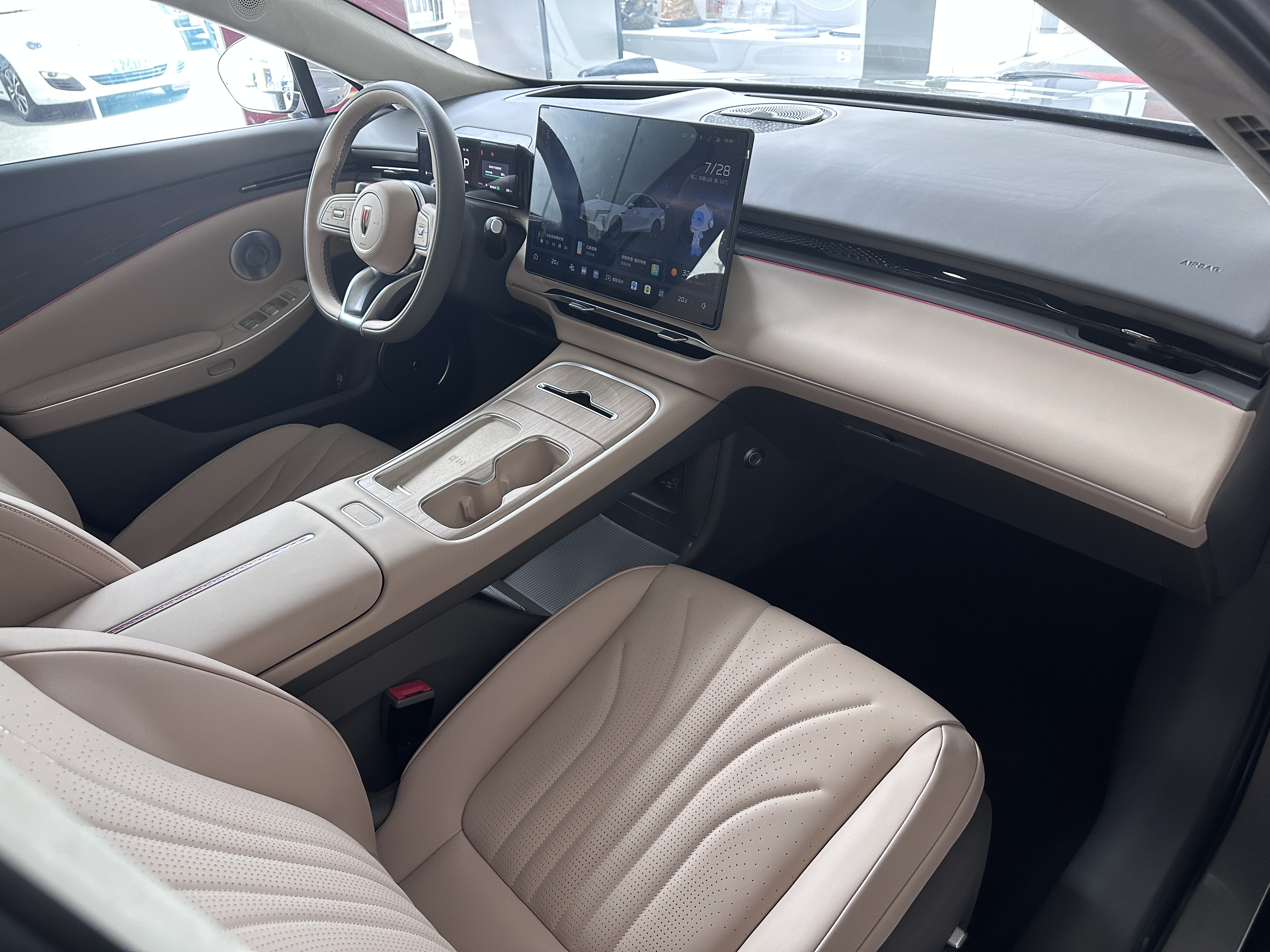
Interior

=== Powertrain ===
The second-generation H7 is available exclusively as a plug-in hybrid. It is powered by a 1.5-liter turbocharged petrol engine in Miller cycle outputting 141 hp (105 kW; 143 PS) (gross power: 147 hp (110 kW; 149 PS)) and paired to a 1-speed DHT. It is joined by a permanent magnet synchronous motor at the front axle and optionally with another on the rear axle for dual-motor all-wheel drive. All versions have a top speed of 200 km/h (124 mph).

The H7 set the Guinness World Record for the farthest distance traveled by a production plug-in hybrid sedan without recharging or refueling with a distance of 2,916.171 km (1,812.025 mi).

Specifications
| Battery | | Power | | | Torque | | | Electric range | | DC charging | | 0–100 km/h (62 mph) | Kerb weight |
| Type | Weight | Engine | Motor | System | Engine | Motor | System | WLTP | CLTC | Peak | 20–80% | 0–100 km/h (62 mph) | Kerb weight |
|---|---|---|---|---|---|---|---|---|---|---|---|---|---|
| 23.9 kWh LFP CANE | 203.5 kg (449 lb) | 141 hp (105 kW; 143 PS) at 5,000rpm | 225 hp (168 kW; 228 PS) | 373 hp (278 kW; 378 PS) | 225 N⋅m (166 lb⋅ft) at 3,000–4,000rpm | 340 N⋅m (251 lb⋅ft) | 565 N⋅m (417 lb⋅ft) | 151 km (94 mi) | 180 km (112 mi) | 115 kW | 10.4 min | 7.4 s | 1,970 kg (4,343 lb) |
| 30.3 kWh NMC Zenergy | 196.5 kg (433 lb) | 141 hp (105 kW; 143 PS) at 5,000rpm | 225 hp (168 kW; 228 PS) | 373 hp (278 kW; 378 PS) | 225 N⋅m (166 lb⋅ft) at 3,000–4,000rpm | 340 N⋅m (251 lb⋅ft) | 565 N⋅m (417 lb⋅ft) | 191 km (119 mi) | 240 km (149 mi) | 100 kW | 13.6 min | 6.9 s | 1,975 kg (4,354 lb) |
| 30.3 kWh NMC Zenergy | 196.5 kg (433 lb) | 141 hp (105 kW; 143 PS) at 5,000rpm | 495 hp (369 kW; 502 PS) | 642 hp (479 kW; 651 PS) | 225 N⋅m (166 lb⋅ft) at 3,000–4,000rpm | 646 N⋅m (476 lb⋅ft) | 871 N⋅m (642 lb⋅ft) | 171 km (106 mi) | 210 km (130 mi) | 100 kW | 13.6 min | 3.9 s | 2,090 kg (4,608 lb) |
