= Toyota Crown Majesta =

Full-size luxury sedan

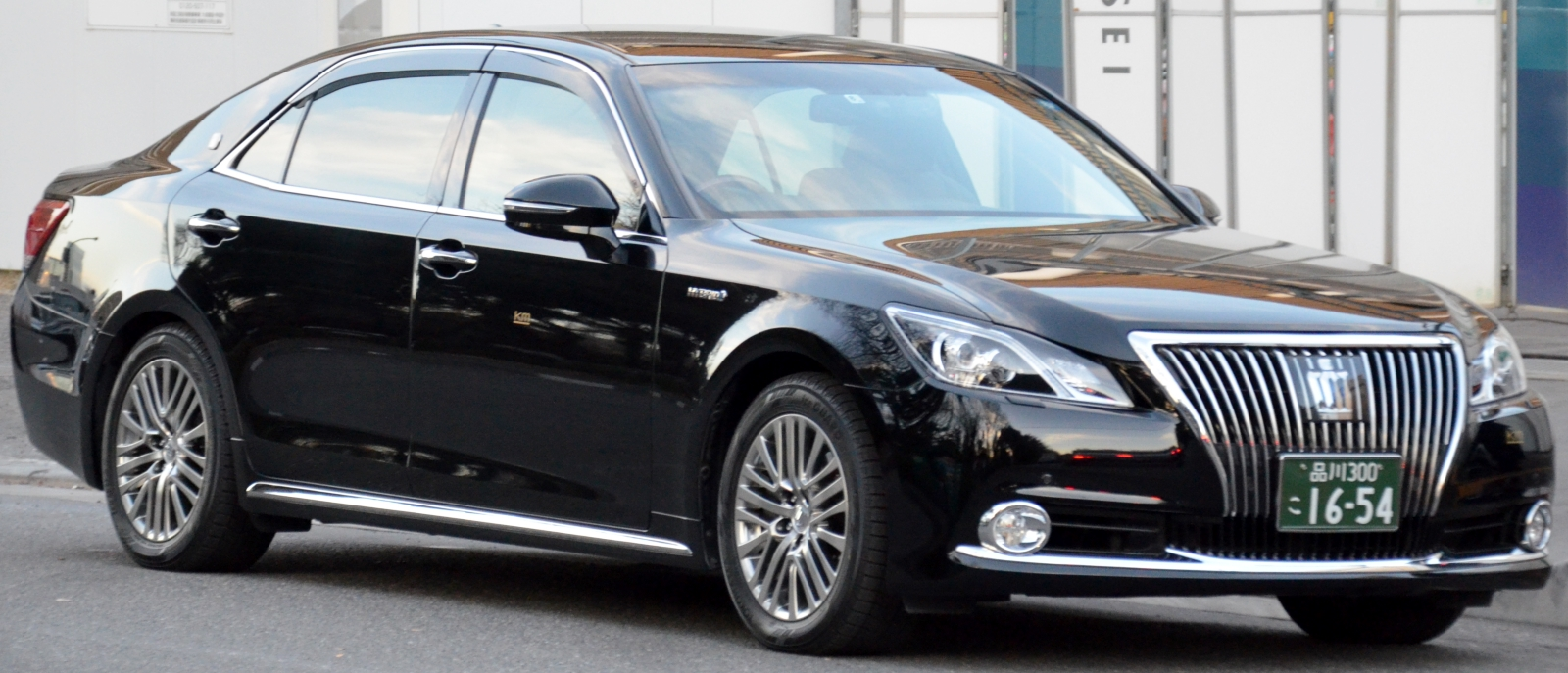

Overview
- Manufacturer: Toyota
- Production: October 1991 – April 2018 (Japan); 2006–2020 (China)

Body and chassis
- Class: Full-size luxury car
- Body style: 4-door hardtop sedan (1991–1999); 4-door sedan (1999–2018)
- Layout: Front-engine, rear-wheel-drive; Front-engine, four-wheel-drive
- Related: Toyota Crown; Toyota Aristo/Lexus GS

Chronology
- Predecessor: Toyota Crown Royal Saloon G (S130)
- Successor: Toyota Crown G-Executive (S220)

The Toyota Crown Majesta (Japanese: トヨタ・クラウンマジェスタ, Hepburn: Toyota Kuraun Majesuta) is a full-size luxury sedan from Toyota. It is an upmarket variant of the Crown and serves as Toyota's flagship model in various countries.

The Crown Majesta appeared after the international introduction of the Celsior/Lexus LS in late 1989; the Celsior was exclusive to Toyopet Store locations on a newer platform. The Crown Majesta, positioned as a modern limousine alternative to the already existing Century and shares the flagship role, was exclusive to Toyota Japanese dealerships called Toyota Store. The Crown Majesta appeared before the Aristo/Lexus GS, which was assigned to Toyota Vista Store locations and shared the Crown and Crown Majesta platform.

The Crown Majesta shares a stretched variant of the smaller Crown platform series which is also used in the Aristo/GS, however, it is not just an upper trim level of the Crown sedan, the Majesta is a separate car with unique styling and interior treatment. The Crown Majesta was later released in other countries in Asia such as China.

== First generation (S140; 1991) ==
First generation (S140)
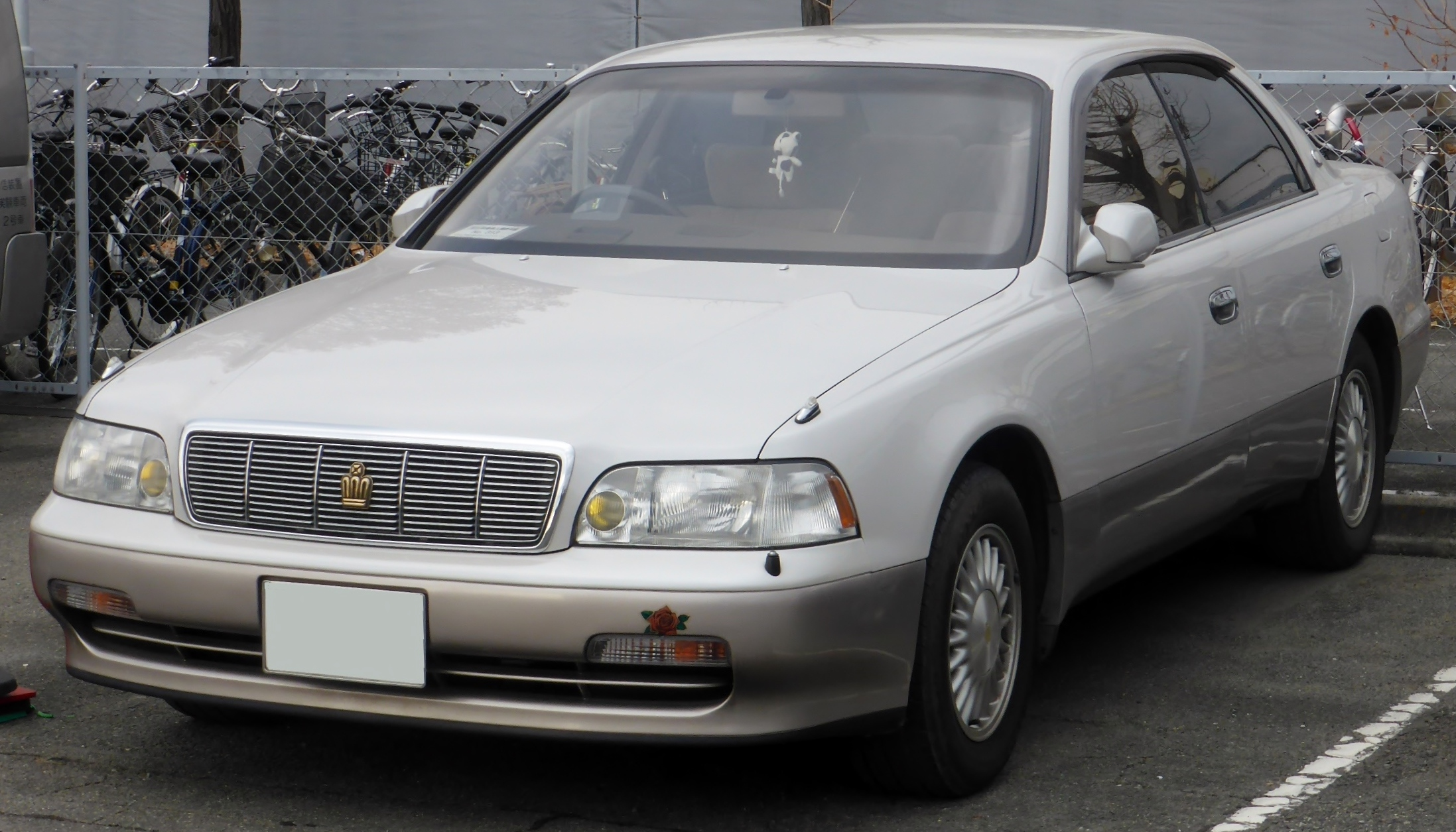

Overview
- Production: October 1991 – August 1995
- Assembly: Japan: Toyota City, Aichi (Motomachi plant); Tahara, Aichi (Tahara plant)

Body and chassis
- Body style: 4-door hardtop sedan
- Related: Toyota Crown (S140); Toyota Aristo/Lexus GS (S140)

Powertrain
- Engine: Petrol: 3.0 L 2JZ-GE I6 (JZS147/149); 4.0 L 1UZ-FE V8 (UZS141/143/145/147)
- Power output: 169 kW (230 PS; 227 hp) (2JZ-GE); 191 kW (260 PS; 256 hp) (1UZ-FE)
- Transmission: 4-speed automatic

Dimensions
- Wheelbase: 2,780 mm (109.4 in)
- Length: 4,900 mm (192.9 in)
- Width: 1,800 mm (70.9 in)
- Height: 1,420 mm (55.9 in)
- Kerb weight: 1,670 kg (3,682 lb)

The first-generation Crown Majesta was introduced in Japan as a 4-door hardtop sedan in October 1991. It had much of its resemblance to its smaller sibling, the Crown. It also bore a resemblance to the larger Celsior, which was a sedan that appeared earlier in 1989. At first, the Crown Majesta was a trim level variant of the Crown series, called the Crown Royal Saloon G. The Majesta was a more luxurious variant of the Crown and was slightly wider and heavier, necessitating two engine choices: the 3.0-litre 2JZ-GE six-cylinder, which produced 169 kW (230 PS; 227 hp) and the 4.0-litre 1UZ-FE V8, which produced 191 kW (256 hp; 260 PS). The two engine choices gave Japanese buyers the option as to which annual road tax obligation they were willing to pay. Unlike the body-on-frame S140 hardtop, the Majesta was built using unibody construction, becoming the first model in the Crown family to adopt such a design.

In 1992, four-wheel steering was offered combined with the four-wheel drive system, called 4WDi-Four. This boosted handling capabilities and gave increased traction. Advanced for this time, the Crown Majesta had an optional GPS navigation system, electronic instrument cluster, electric power steering, heated front and rear electric seats, a head-up display that projected key information on the inside windshield surface above the instrument cluster, and an i-Four comprehensive vehicle control system.

A battery-electric version called the Crown Majesta EV was made as a lease-only vehicle in 1993.

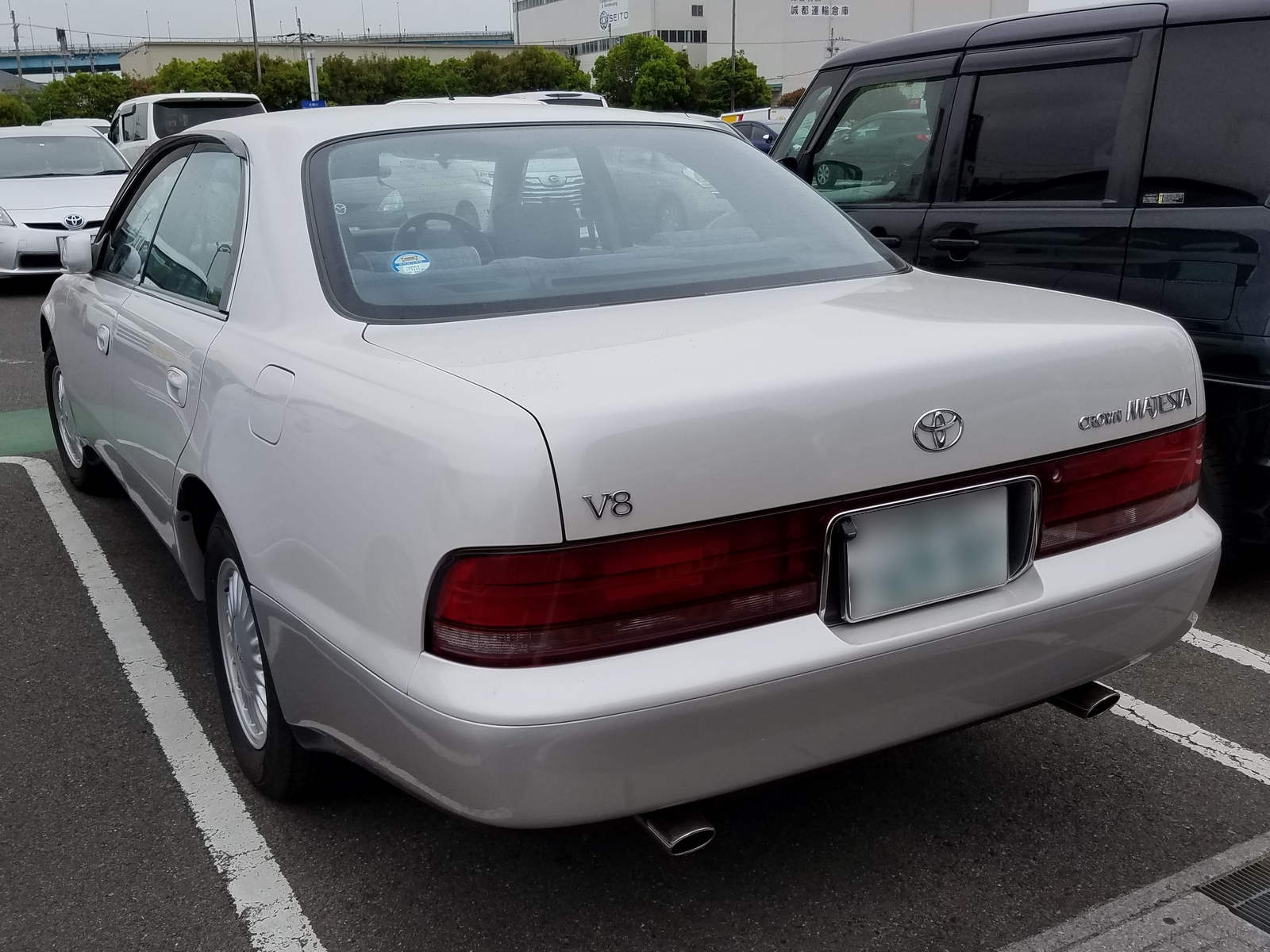
Rear view

== Second generation (S150; 1995) ==
Second generation (S150)
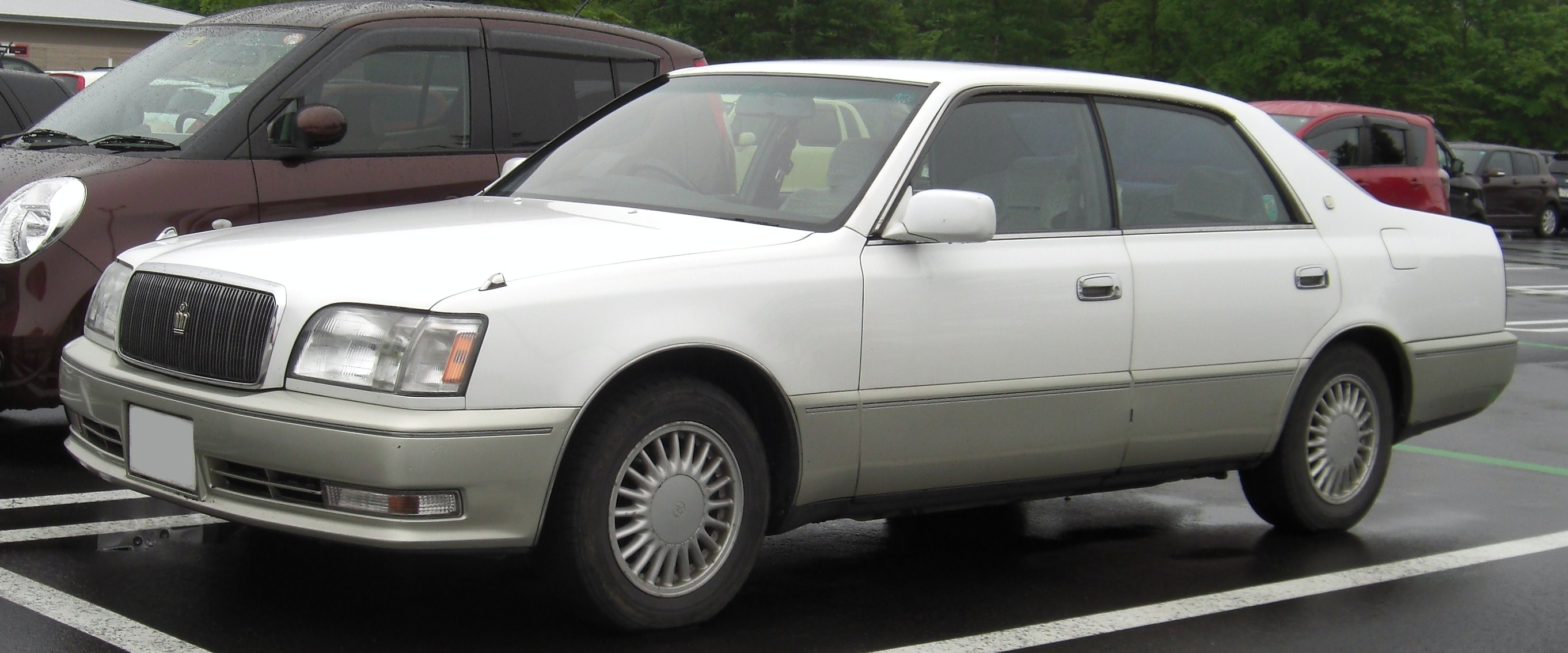

Overview
- Production: August 1995 – September 1999
- Assembly: Japan: Toyota City, Aichi (Motomachi plant); Tahara, Aichi (Tahara plant)

Body and chassis
- Body style: 4-door hardtop sedan
- Related: Toyota Crown (S150); Toyota Aristo/Lexus GS (S160)

Powertrain
- Engine: Petrol: 3.0 L 2JZ-GE I6 (JZS155); 4.0 L 1UZ-FE V8 (UZS151/155/157)
- Power output: 168 kW (225 hp; 228 PS) (2JZ-GE); 195–206 kW (261–276 hp; 265–280 PS) (1UZ-FE)
- Transmission: 4-speed automatic; 5-speed automatic

Dimensions
- Wheelbase: 2,780 mm (109.4 in)
- Length: 4,900 mm (192.9 in)
- Width: 1,795 mm (70.7 in)
- Height: 1,430 mm (56.3 in)
- Kerb weight: 1,670 kg (3,682 lb)

The Crown Majesta underwent its first redesign in 1995. Notable enhancements were made to the taillights to distinguish the model from the lower-spec Crown. The redesign made the vehicle similar to the XF20 series Celsior/LS 400, which debuted in 1994. Changes were also made to the engine lineup. The 3.0-litre engine stayed the same, but the 4.0-litre-powered unit received a power increase to 195 kW (261 hp; 265 PS). Due to cost-cutting efforts within Toyota, the list of optional equipment offered was simplified.

The second-generation Majesta is the first Toyota model to be equipped with vehicle stability control in 1995.

At its introduction in 1996, it won the Automotive Researchers' and Journalists' Conference Car of the Year award in Japan which it shared with the 1996 Crown.

In August 1997, the front grille was restyled and HID headlights were introduced. VVT-i technology was offered on the V8 engine, improving the power to 206 kW (276 hp; 280 PS). A 5-speed automatic transmission was also introduced. Four-wheel steering was no longer offered. In addition, a two-tone paint scheme offered an upmarket image for the Crown Majesta.

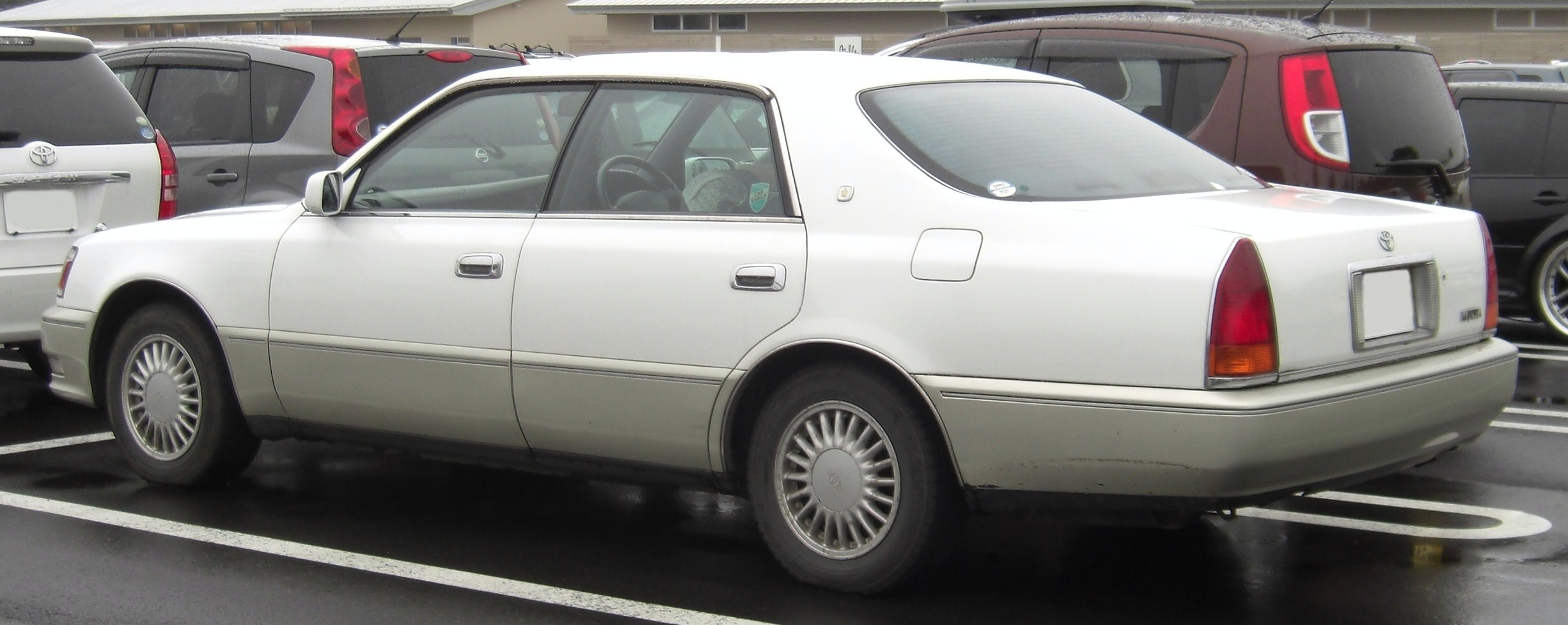
Rear view

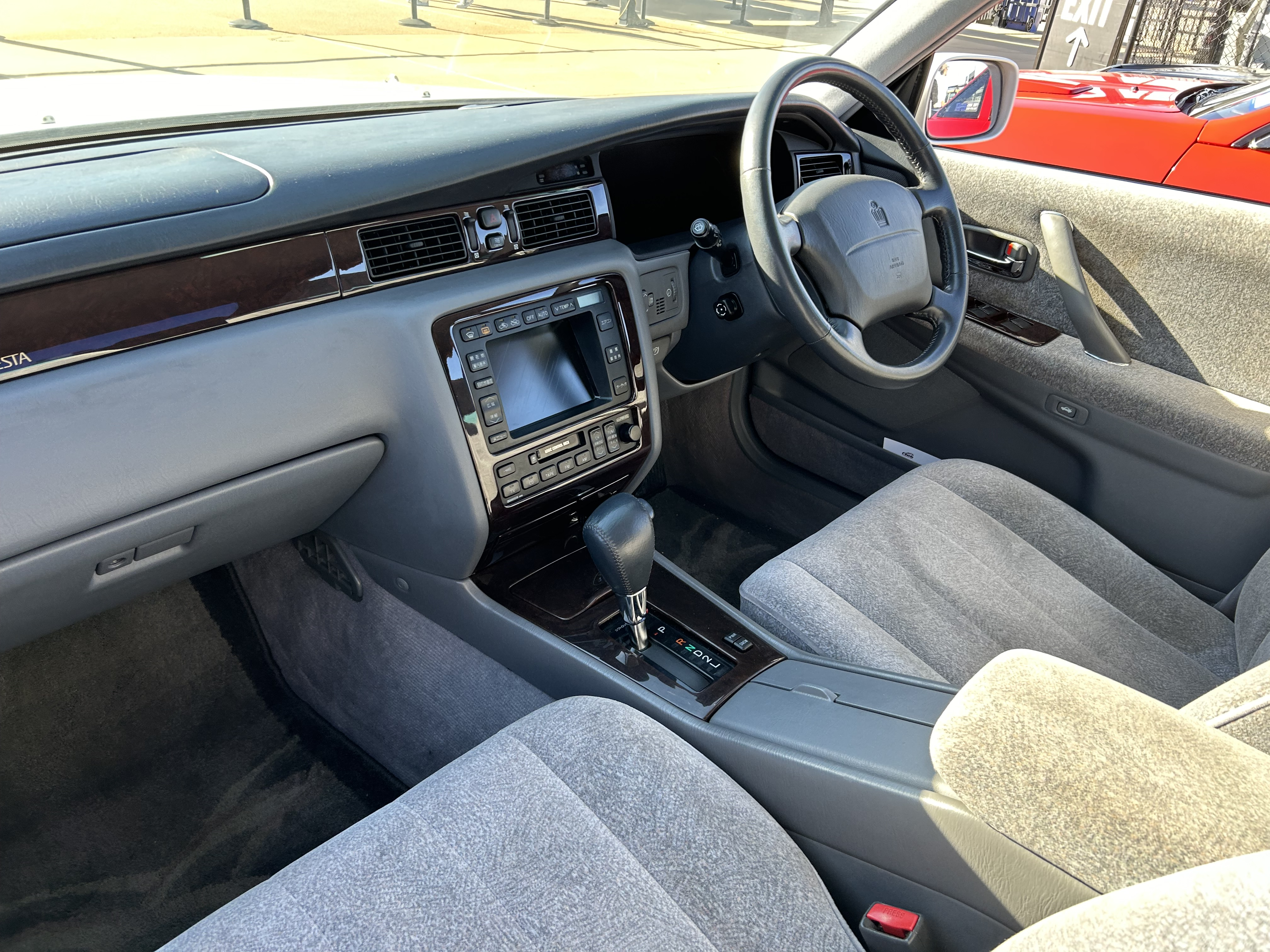
Interior

== Third generation (S170; 1999) ==
Third generation (S170)
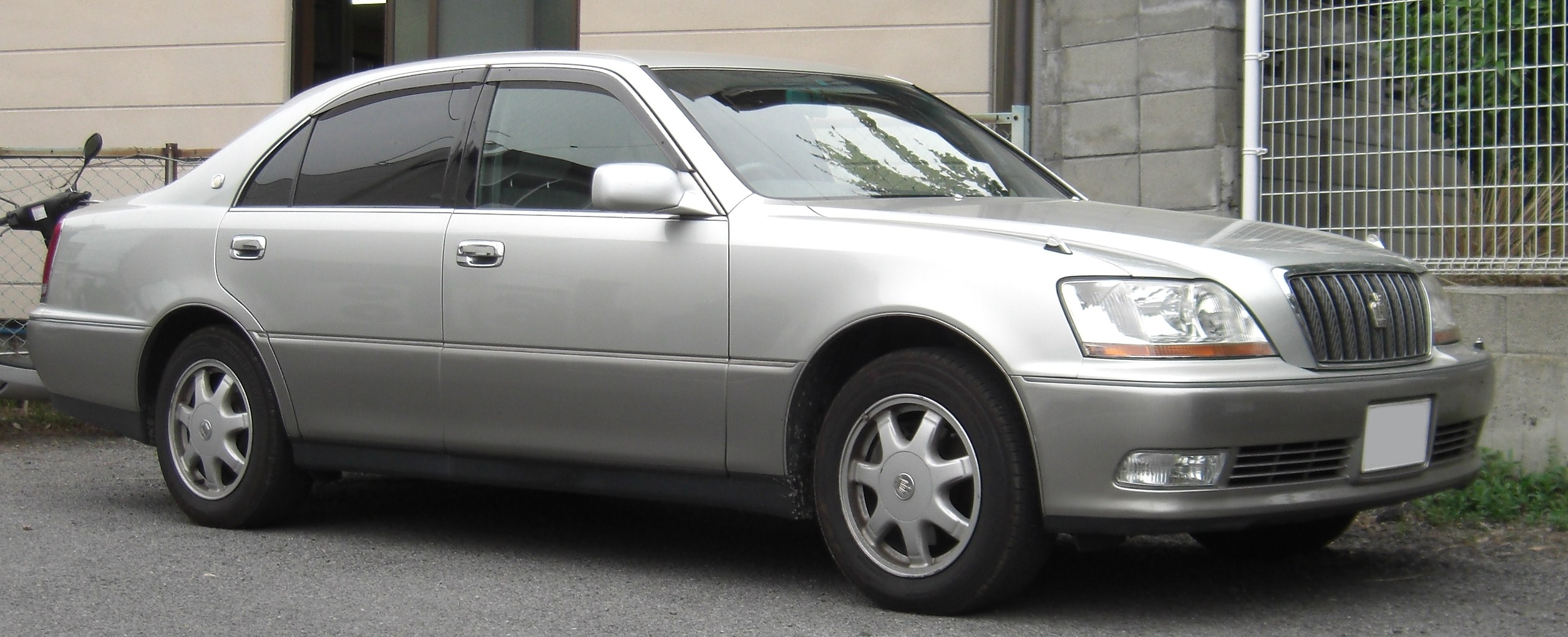

Overview
- Production: September 1999 – July 2004
- Assembly: Japan: Toyota City, Aichi (Motomachi plant); Tahara, Aichi (Tahara plant)

Body and chassis
- Body style: 4-door sedan
- Related: Toyota Crown (S170)

Powertrain
- Engine: Petrol: 3.0 L 2JZ-FSE I6 (JZS177); 4.0 L 1UZ-FE V8 (UZS171/173/175)
- Power output: 168 kW (225 hp; 228 PS) (2JZ-FSE); 216 kW (290 hp; 294 PS) (1UZ-FE)
- Transmission: 4-speed automatic; 5-speed A650E automatic

Dimensions
- Wheelbase: 2,800 mm (110.2 in)
- Length: 4,900 mm (192.9 in)
- Width: 1,795 mm (70.7 in)
- Height: 1,465 mm (57.7 in)
- Kerb weight: 1,670–1,780 kg (3,682–3,924 lb)

This version was released in September 1999 and received a complete redesign, further incorporating styling elements of the Celsior/LS. Wider vertical taillights were incorporated as well as redesigned headlights, grille and minor aesthetic updates. Four-wheel steering was again offered. The previous two-tone paint scheme options remained as well as Toyota's other top-of-the-line features for this model.

DVD-based GPS navigation was also introduced, as well as an "Ottoman" footrest for the rear passenger seats. This was achieved by enabling part of the seat cushion of the front passenger seat back to tilt rearward towards the rear seat passengers.

The model came in a C-type or an A-type option, the A-type having less standard options with conventional spring and shock suspension as standard, while the C-type had more options as standard such as height adjustable air suspension, TEMS, dual zone climate control, rear wheel steering and power rear seat as standard with leather as optional. All engine variants also had the option for 4WDi-Four four-wheel drive system.

The S170 series Crown Majesta received an updated version of the 4.0-litre engine with VVT-i, rated at 216 kW (290 hp; 294 PS), while the 3.0-litre option was changed to the 2JZ-FSE type. The trend among automakers towards large-diameter wheels with low-profile tires was ignored in favour of a more comfortable ride and better handling with smaller wheels. This model also made available with a 5-speed "Super ECT" automatic transmission.

It was made the official company car for senior-level Toyota management. This model also had a 10th Anniversary special edition run which was a fully optioned C-type specification model with leather and a sunroof as standard.

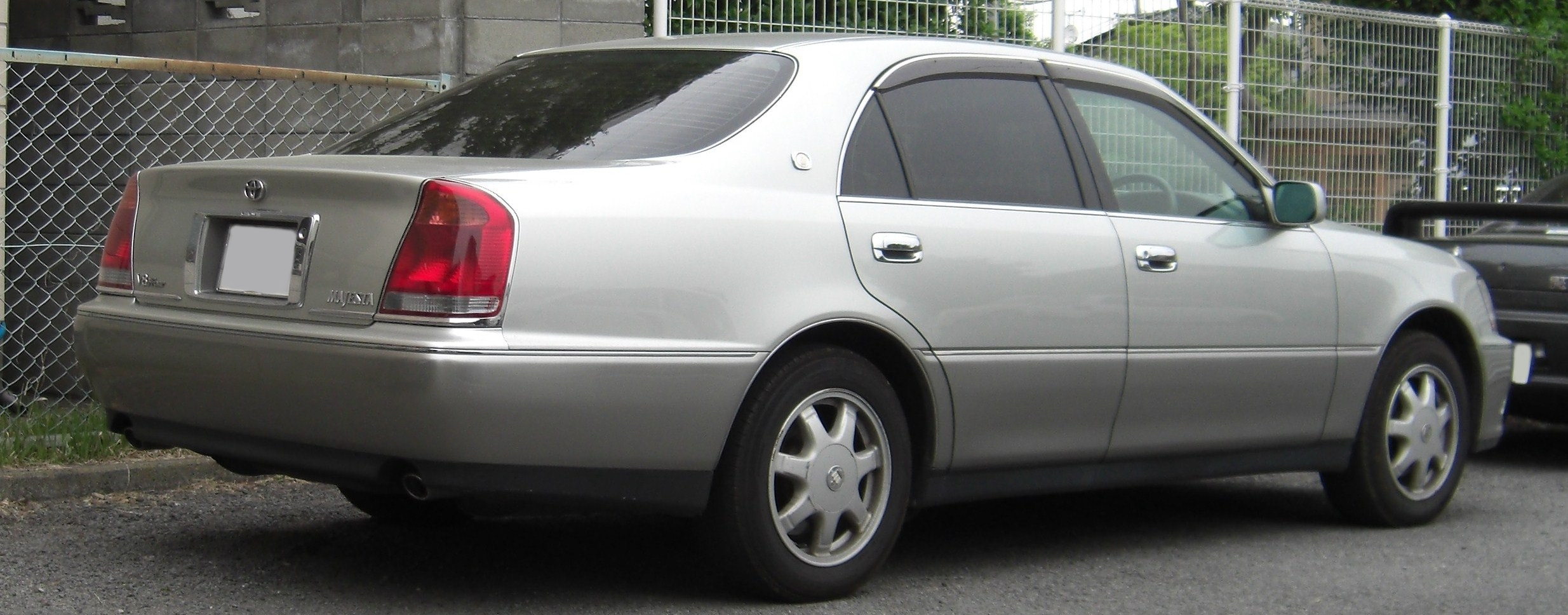
Rear view

== Fourth generation (S180; 2004) ==
Fourth generation (S180)
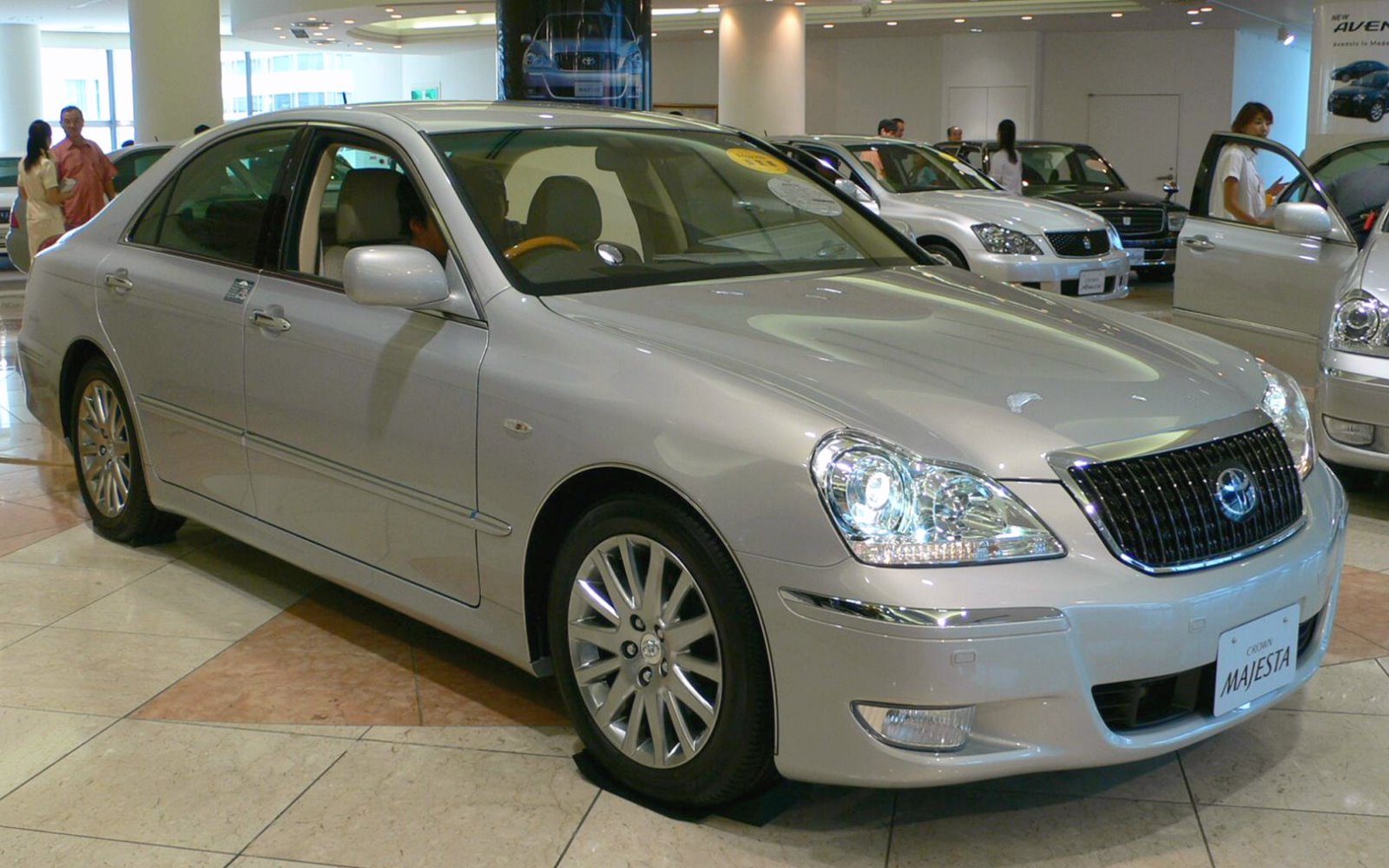

Overview
- Also called: Hongqi Shengshi; Hongqi HQ300/HQ430 (2006-2008)
- Production: July 2004 – March 2009; 2006–2010 (China)
- Assembly: Japan: Toyota City, Aichi (Motomachi plant); China: Tianjin (TFTM)

Body and chassis
- Body style: 4-door sedan
- Platform: Toyota N platform
- Related: Toyota Crown (S180); Lexus GS (S190)

Powertrain
- Engine: 4.3 L 3UZ-FE V8 (UZS186/187)
- Power output: 206 kW (280 PS; 276 hp) (3UZ-FE)
- Transmission: 6-speed automatic

Dimensions
- Wheelbase: 2,850 mm (112.2 in)
- Length: 4,975 mm (195.9 in)
- Width: 1,795 mm (70.7 in)
- Height: 1,475 mm (58.1 in)
- Kerb weight: 1,780 kg (3,924 lb)

The fourth-generation Crown Majesta was introduced on 6 July 2004. In August 2006, the Celsior was no longer offered in Japan, due to the introduction of the Lexus brand there. The Crown Majesta replaced the Celsior, despite objections from Japanese customers. It introduced the first Vehicle Dynamics Integrated Management (VDIM) integrated vehicle handling and software control system and radar adaptive cruise control with low-speed tracking function. The engine was upgraded to the 4.3 L 3UZ-FE V8 unit, shared with the US-spec LS 430. The transmission was upgraded to a 6-speed automatic unit, the four-wheel drive system was improved, and air suspension was introduced. Intelligent adaptive front lighting and rear curtain airbags were added to improve safety. Enhancements were made to the interior of the vehicle, including a rear-view camera and parking assistance technology.

Toyota Modellista International also offered a semi-factory supercharger installation (only on two-wheel drive models). This included suspension revisions, a reinforced automatic transmission, a different muffler, and special badging. The supercharger increased the car's maximum power to 250 kW (340 PS; 335 hp).

In July 2004, the Crown Majesta introduced both a lane keeping assist and a radar pre-collision system with a single camera to improve the accuracy of collision forecast and warning and control levels.

For 2006, G-Book was added to the list of standard features, along with a rear-view camera. A departure from previous models, the two-tone paint scheme was removed to target a younger audience.

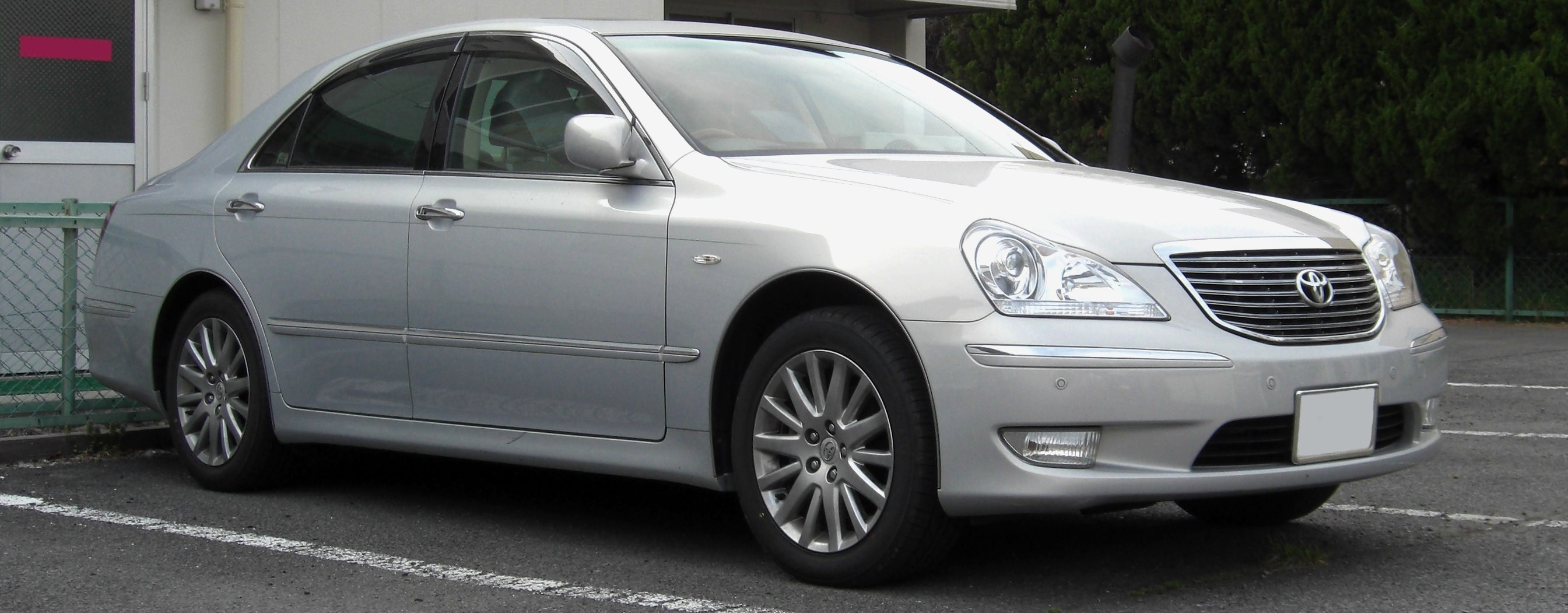
Pre-facelift model

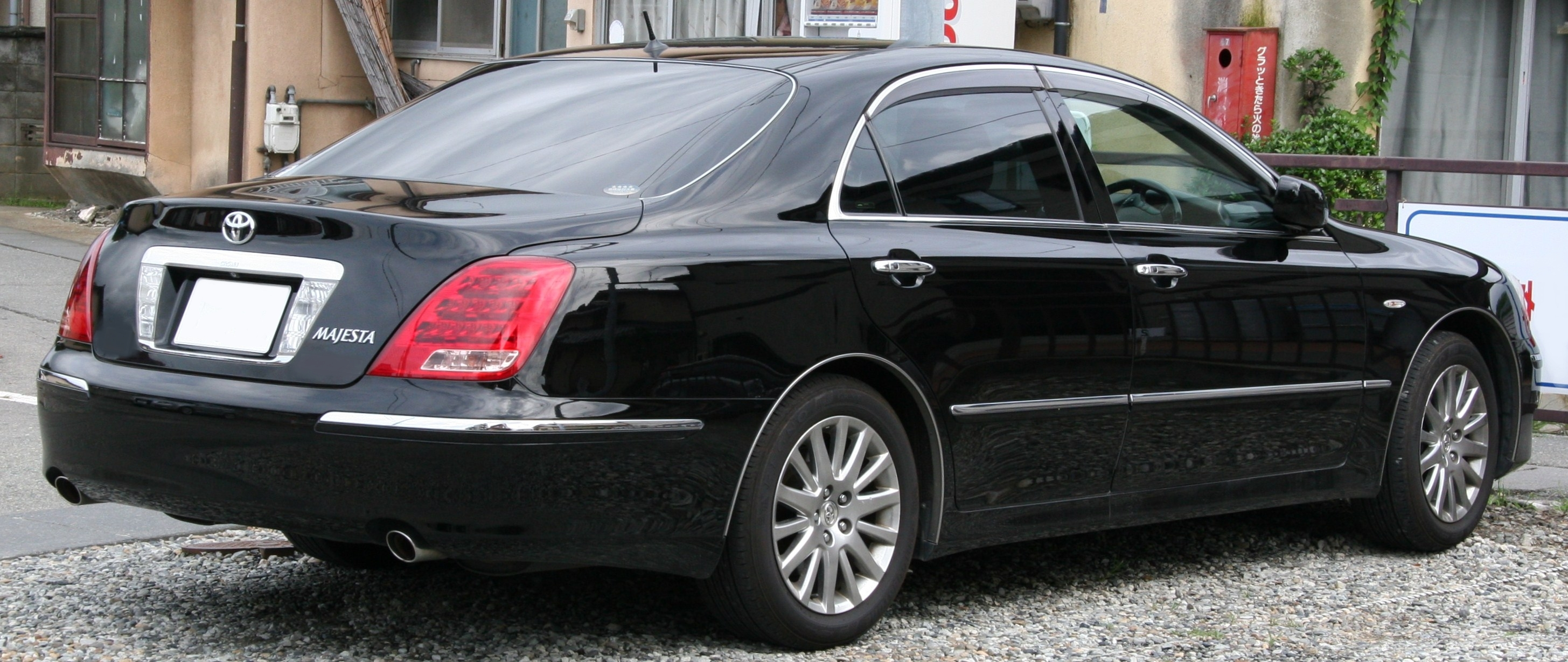
Rear view

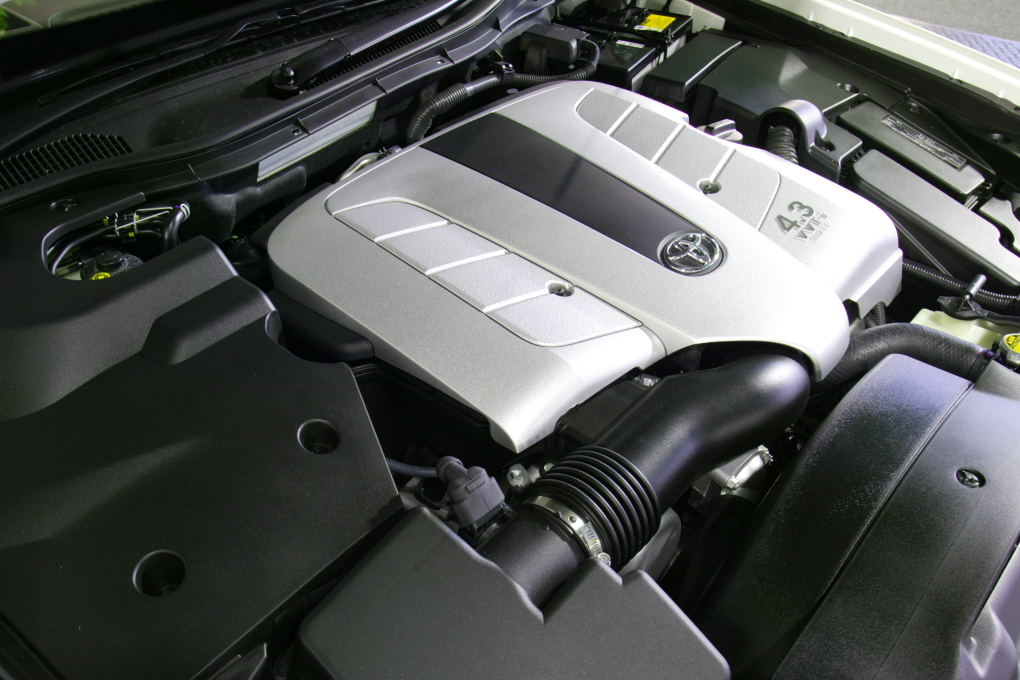
3UZ-FE engine in the Crown Majesta

=== Hongqi Shengshi ===
Hongqi Shengshi
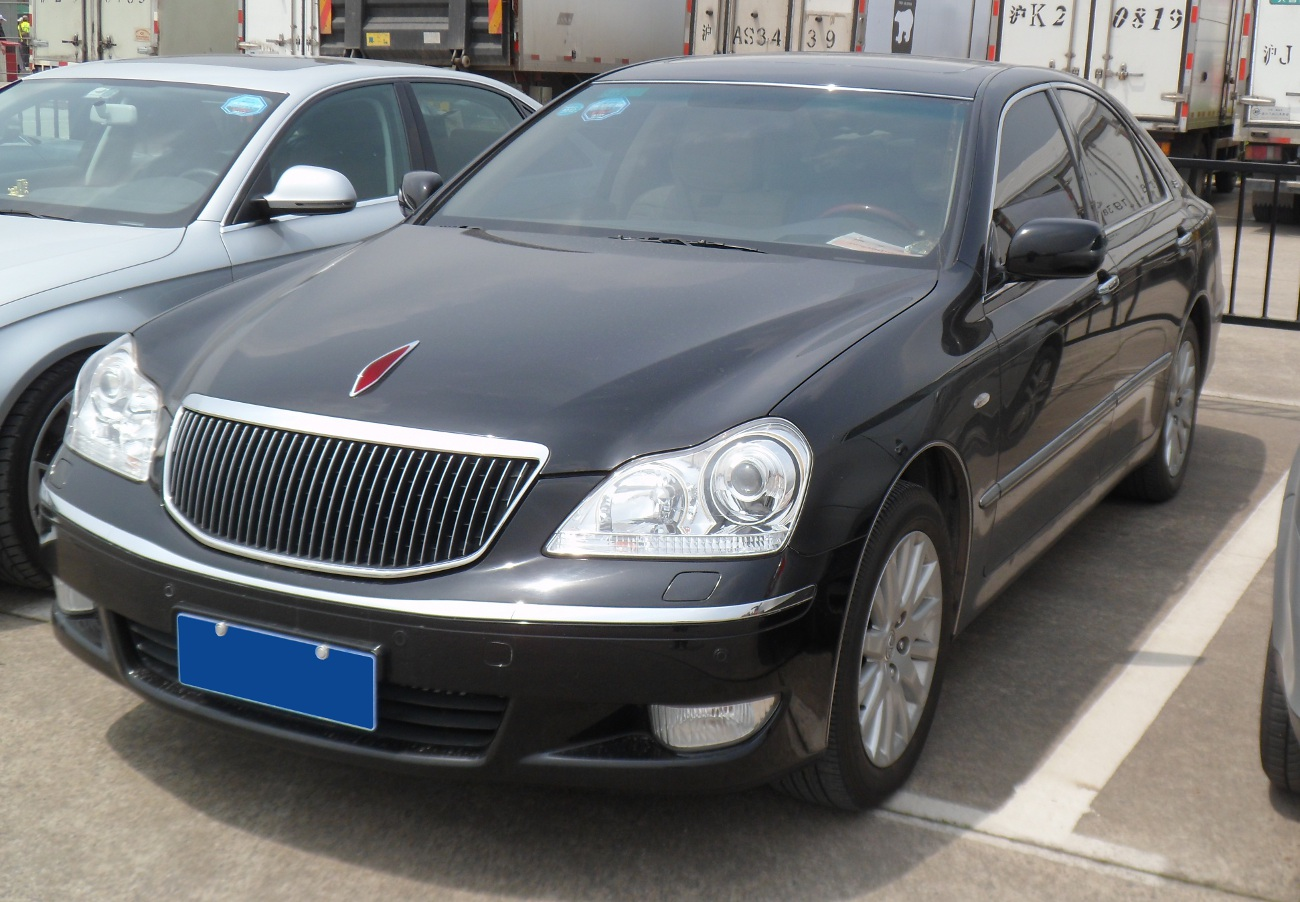

Overview
- Manufacturer: Hongqi
- Also called: Hongqi HQ300/HQ430 (2006-2008); Toyota Crown Majesta (S180)
- Production: 2006–2010
- Assembly: China: Tianjin (TFTM)

Body and chassis
- Class: Full size car (F)
- Body style: 4-door sedan
- Layout: Front-engine, rear-wheel-drive
- Platform: Toyota N platform

Powertrain
- Engine: Petrol: 3.0 L 3GR-FE V6; 4.3 L 3UZ-FE V8
- Transmission: 6-speed automatic

Dimensions
- Wheelbase: 2,850 mm (112.2 in)
- Length: 4,965 mm (195.5 in)
- Width: 1,795 mm (70.7 in)
- Height: 1,485 mm (58.5 in)

Chronology
- Predecessor: Hongqi CA7202E3
- Successor: Hongqi H7

In China, this generation of the Crown Majesta was rebadged and sold as the Hongqi Shengshi from 2006 to 2010, using the Crown Majesta's V8 engine or the 3-litre 3GR-FE V6 engine from the regular Crown; the latter was not available on this generation of the Crown Majesta.

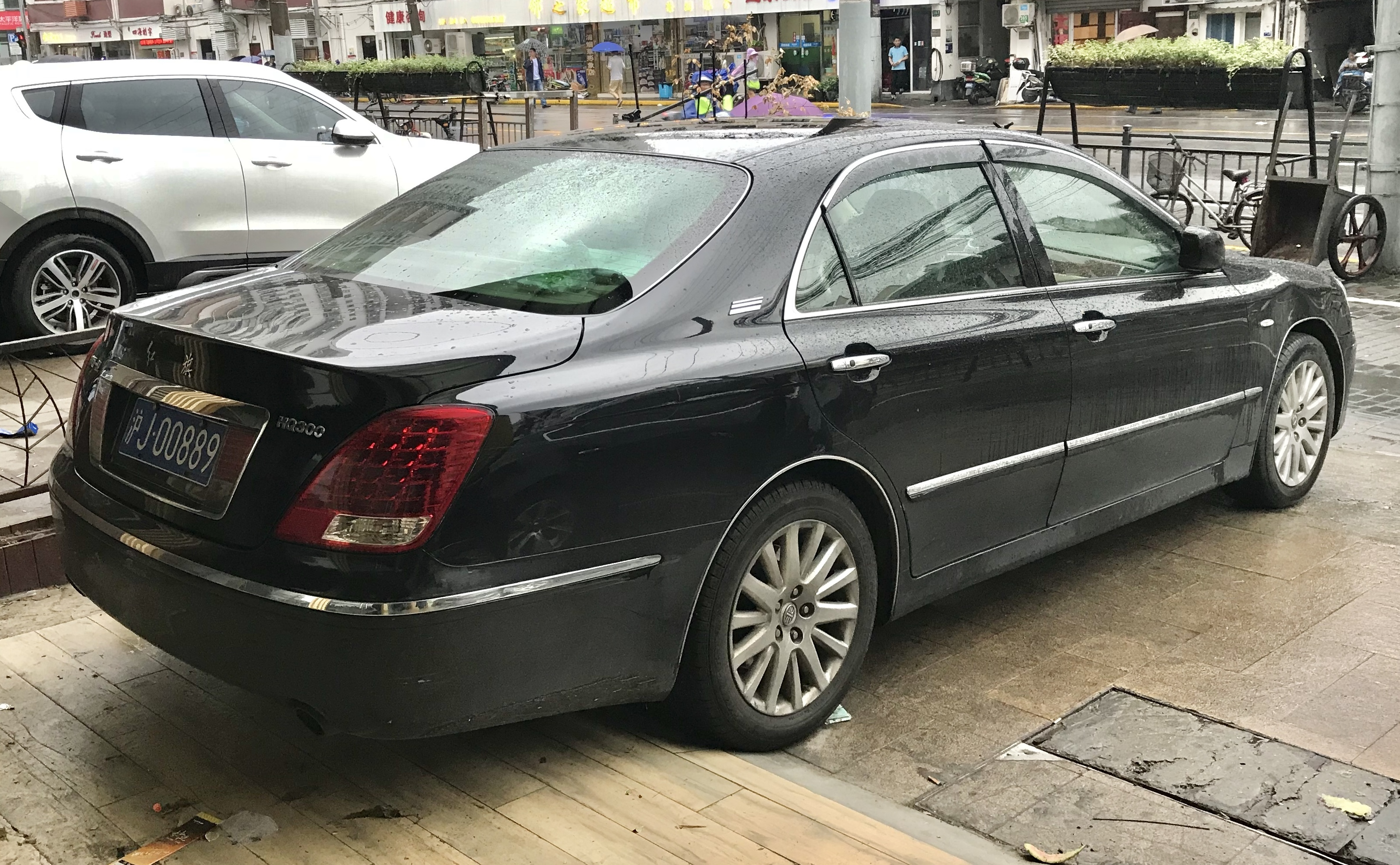
Rear view

== Fifth generation (S200; 2009) ==
Fifth generation (S200)
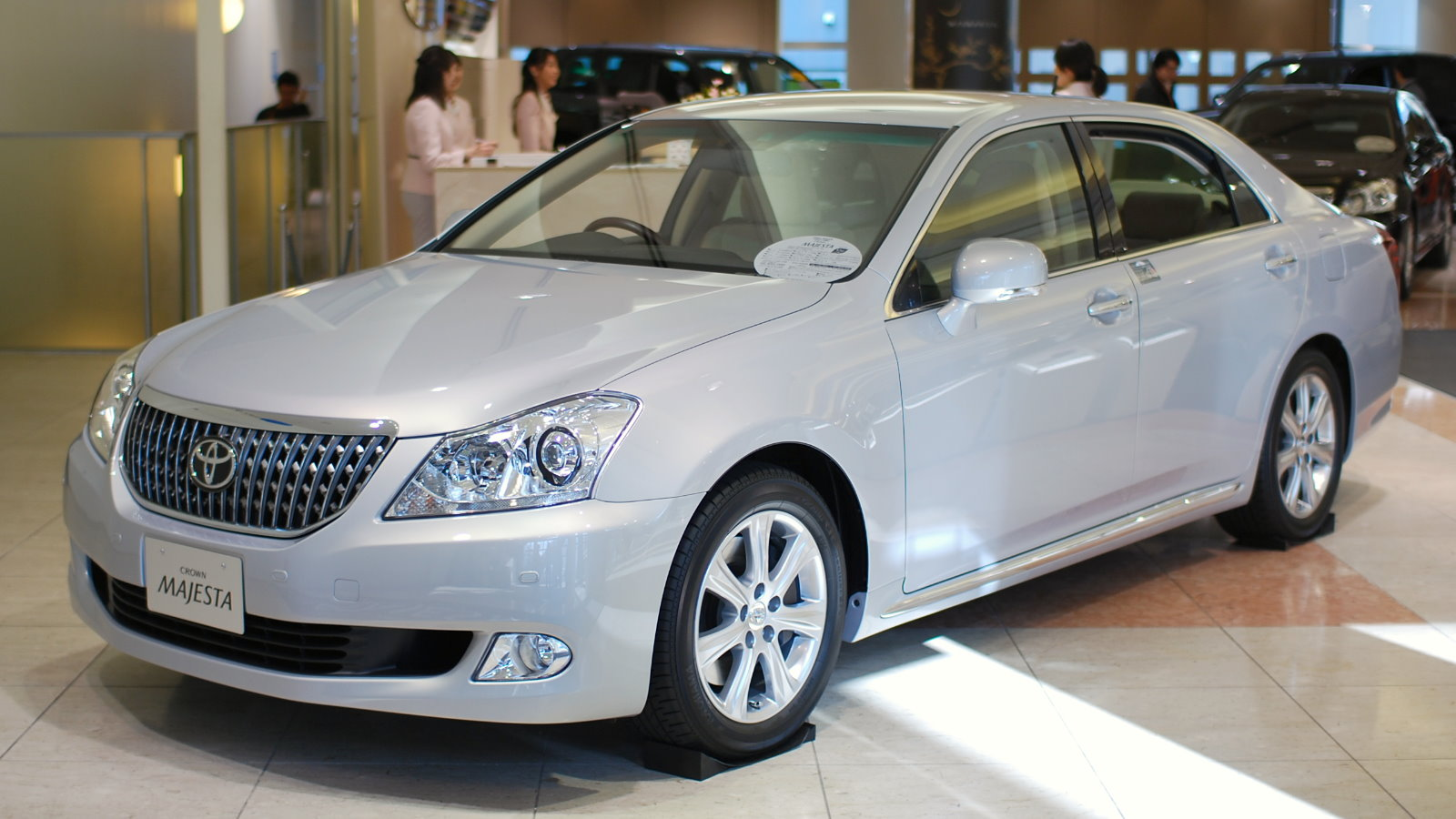

Overview
- Also called: Toyota Crown Royal Saloon VIP (China)
- Production: March 2009 – September 2013; 2009–2015 (China)
- Assembly: Japan: Toyota City, Aichi (Motomachi plant); China: Tianjin (TFTM)

Body and chassis
- Body style: 4-door sedan
- Platform: Toyota N platform
- Related: Toyota Crown (S200); Lexus GS (S190); Hongqi H7

Powertrain
- Engine: Petrol: 2.5 L 5GR-FE V6 (China); 3.0 L 3GR-FE V6 (not Japan); 4.3 L 3UZ-FE V8 (UZS207); 4.6 L 1UR-FSE V8 (URS206)
- Power output: 145 kW (197 PS; 194 hp) (5GR-FE); 170 kW (231 PS; 228 hp) (3GR-FE); 206 kW (280 PS; 276 hp) (3UZ-FE); 255 kW (347 PS; 342 hp) (1UR-FSE)
- Transmission: 6-speed automatic; 8-speed AA80E automatic (4.6 L)

Dimensions
- Wheelbase: 2,925 mm (115.2 in)
- Length: 4,995 mm (196.7 in)
- Width: 1,810 mm (71.3 in)
- Height: 1,475 mm (58.1 in)
- Kerb weight: 1,770–1,810 kg (3,902–3,990 lb)

On 26 March 2009, The fifth-generation Crown Majesta was released, evolving substantially while retaining the overall styling of its predecessor. Although it was initially reported that the name "Crown" would be removed, establishing the Majesta as an independent car, this did not happen and the car remained called the Crown Majesta. The body size expanded from the previous generation, comparable to the LS.

As with the GS and LS, the 4.6-litre 1UR-FSE V8 engine is standard. However, cars with the four-wheel drive option used the 4.3 L 3UZ-FE engine. The larger engine incurs a higher road tax liability than the smaller 4.3-litre unit.

In China, FAW Toyota assembled a limited number of left-hand-drive S200 series Crown Majesta, which is called Crown Royal Saloon VIP. Another car based on the Crown was called the Hongqi H7 and has been in production since 2013.

The body dimensions became slightly larger, and the wheelbase was extended by 75 mm to add more space to the cabin. The same 4.6-liter V8 engine mounted on the Lexus LS/GS (1UR-FSE) was adopted for the front-engine, rear-wheel-drive (FR) model, while the 4-wheel-drive (4WD) model retained the 4.3-liter V8 engine (3UZ-FE).

The transmission system was an 8-speed Super ECT automatic for the FR model, and a 6-speed Super ECT automatic for the 4WD model. Added to the electronically controlled air suspension equipped on all models was a feature that used the GPS map data to optimize damper control.

Trim Levels

The URS206 came in three main trim levels, with two additional sub-packages available to the A and G type. The main three variants are A Type, C Type, and G Type.

- A Type is the entry level, with cloth seats for five and a reduced entertainment system.
  - A Type with L Package is the same, but with the optional premium leather interior.
- C Type is a mid-spec five-seater model, with options for cloth or leather interior. It has a fridge behind the rear middle seat.
- G Type is the premium five-seater model, with a full leather interior and heated and cooled front seats and heated rears. It also receives a premium sound system.
  - G Type with F Package is the top model, with a four-seater layout with a rear center console. It is fully optioned, including all of the above features and adding an electric ottoman reclining rear left seat. All seats are heated as well as cooled. The Premium Sound package included a 19-channel amplifier and a 20-speaker system.
- Options such as Sunroof, Digital Dash, automatic parking assist, and rear mood lighting can be applied to C Type or higher.

On top of the existing A and C grade models, the high-end G model was newly introduced. The standard A grade model offered an optional L package including the steering support system that enabled the driver to handle the car more effortlessly. The F package option for the four-seater G model included a large rear seat center console and an ottoman for the left rear seat, offering greater comfort to passengers in the rear.

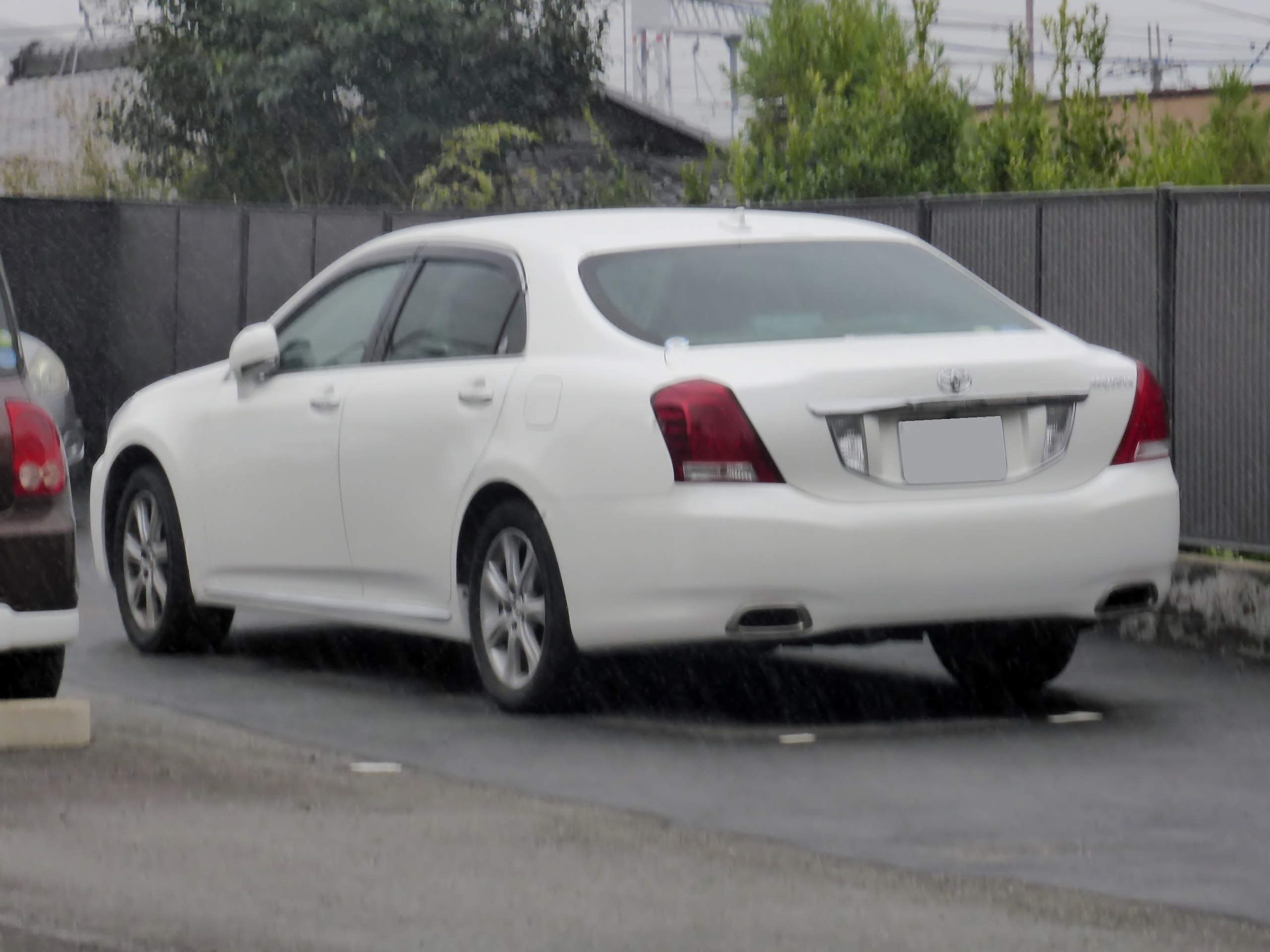
Rear view

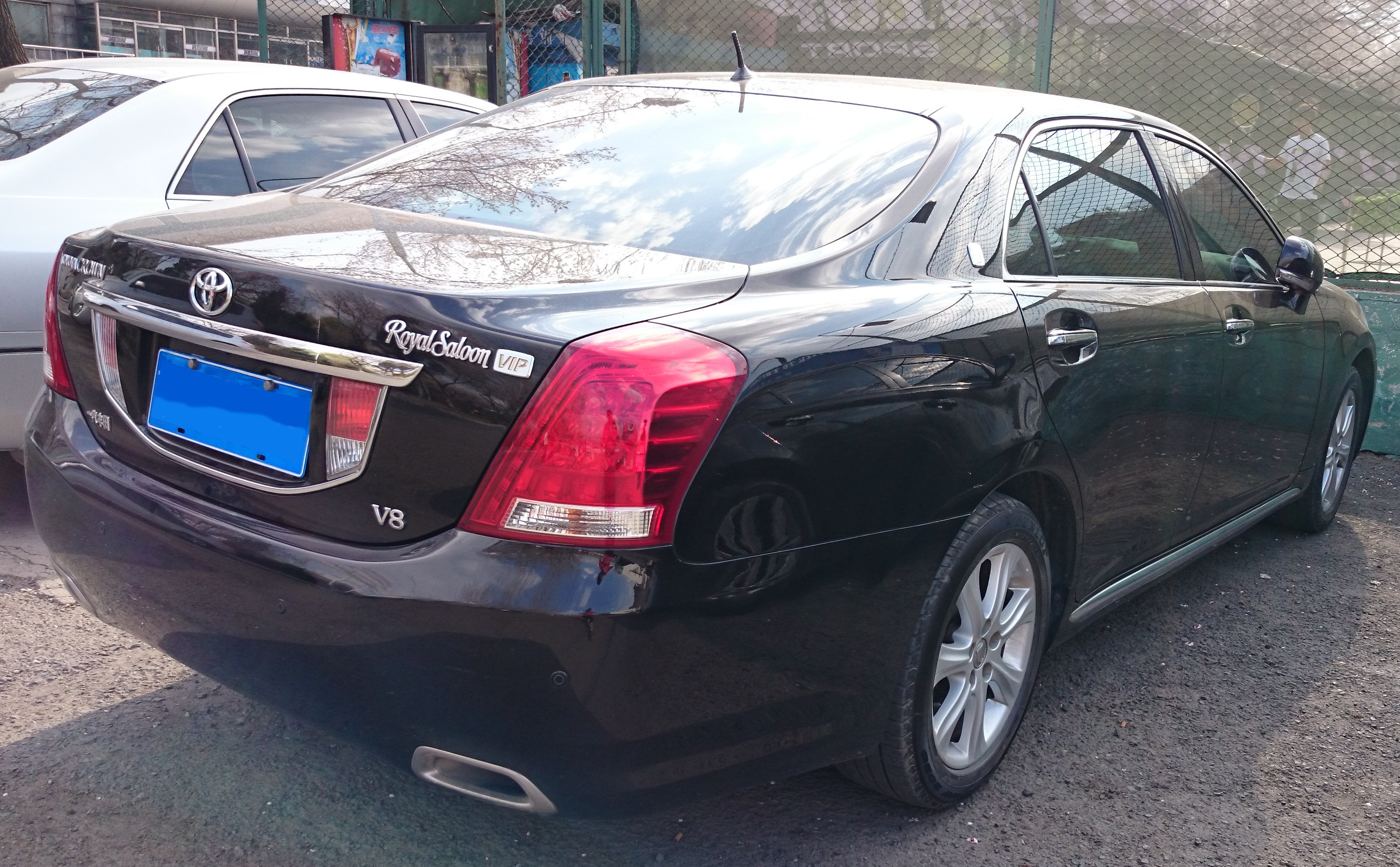
Crown Royal Saloon VIP (China)

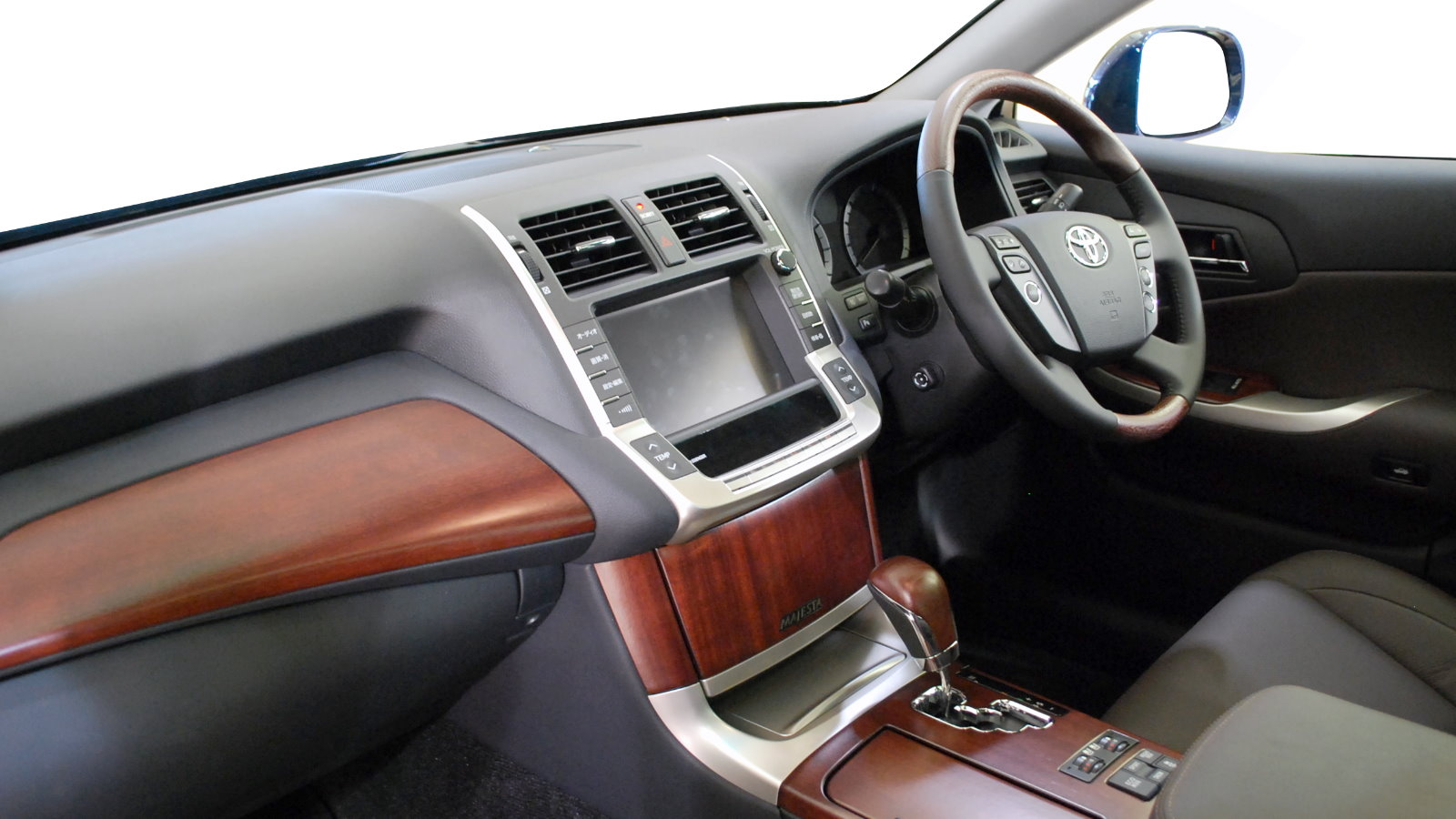
Interior

== Sixth generation (S210; 2013) ==
Sixth generation (S210)
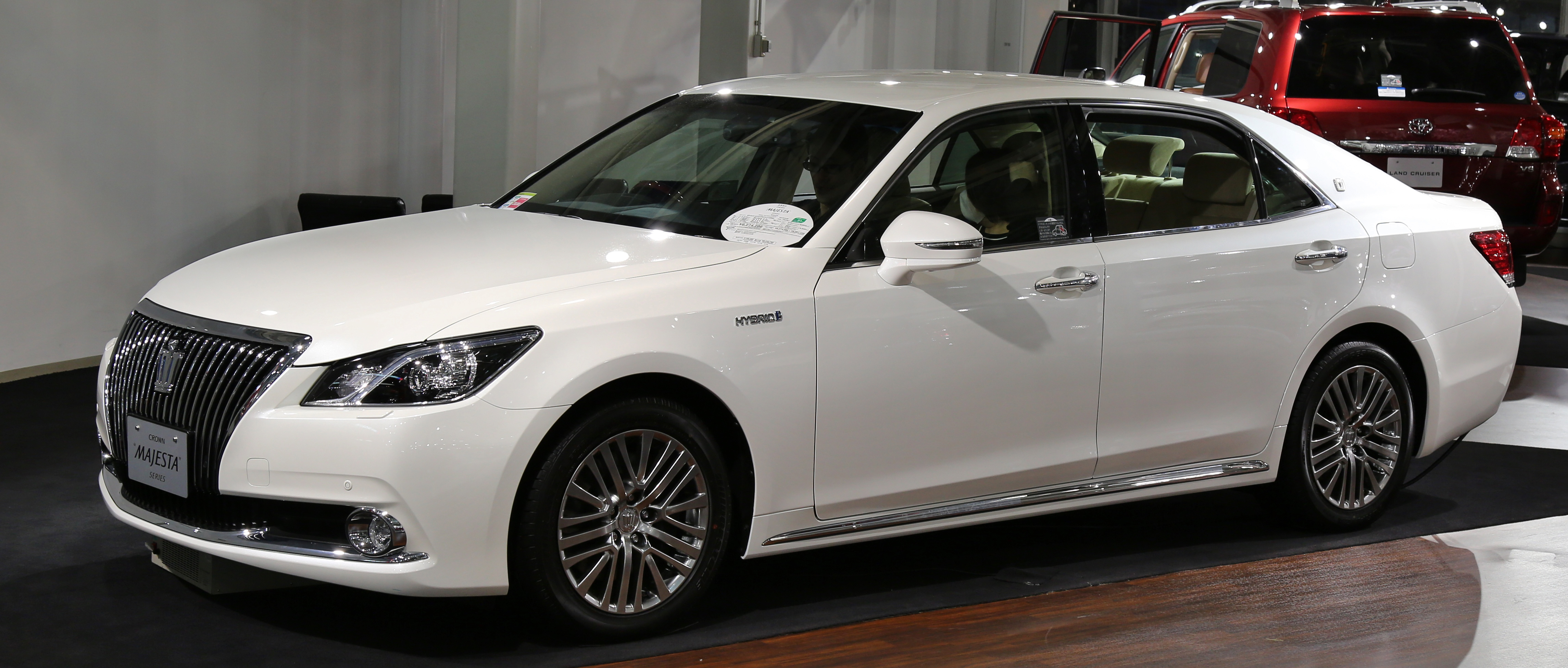

Overview
- Production: September 2013 – April 2018; 2015–2020 (China)
- Assembly: Japan: Toyota City, Aichi (Motomachi plant); China: Tianjin (TFTM)

Body and chassis
- Body style: 4-door sedan
- Platform: Toyota N platform
- Related: Toyota Crown (S210)

Powertrain
- Engine: Petrol hybrid: 2.5 L 2AR-FSE I4 (AWS215); 3.5 L 2GR-FXE V6 (GWS214)
- Electric motor: 105–147 kW (141–197 hp; 143–200 PS) 1KM AC synchronous
- Power output: 131 kW (176 hp; 178 PS) (2AR-FSE; petrol engine only); 162 kW (217 hp; 220 PS) (2AR-FSE; combined system output); 215 kW (288 hp; 292 PS) (2GR-FXE; petrol engine only); 252 kW (338 hp; 343 PS) (2GR-FXE; combined system output)
- Transmission: eCVT
- Hybrid drivetrain: Power-split (THS II)

Dimensions
- Wheelbase: 2,925 mm (115.2 in)
- Length: 4,970 mm (195.7 in)
- Width: 1,800 mm (70.9 in)
- Height: 1,460 mm (57.5 in)
- Kerb weight: 1,810–1,830 kg (3,990–4,034 lb)

Launched in Japan on 9 September 2013, the sixth-generation model replaced the outgoing model's V8 engine with Toyota's 2GR-FXE 3.5-litre V6 hybrid powertrain shared with the Lexus GS 450h (L10) sedan, plus an additional 2.5-litre 2AR-FSE four-cylinder hybrid unit for the four-wheel drive version. The elimination of the V8 engines reduced the annual road tax liability for large engine displacement. The Crown Majesta was given a redesigned appearance after the reintroduction of the Y51 series Nissan Cima in April 2012. Fuel economy is improved to 18.2 km/L (51 mpg_{‑imp}; 43 mpg_{‑US}) under the JC08 test cycle. The wheelbase is 75 mm (3.0 in) longer than the corresponding Crown Royal and Athlete, but 100 mm (3.9 in) shorter than the Century, and incorporates advanced safety and convenience equipment such as blind spot monitoring and a collision avoidance system.

The Crown Majesta was discontinued on 27 April 2018 with the introduction of the unified S220 series Crown.

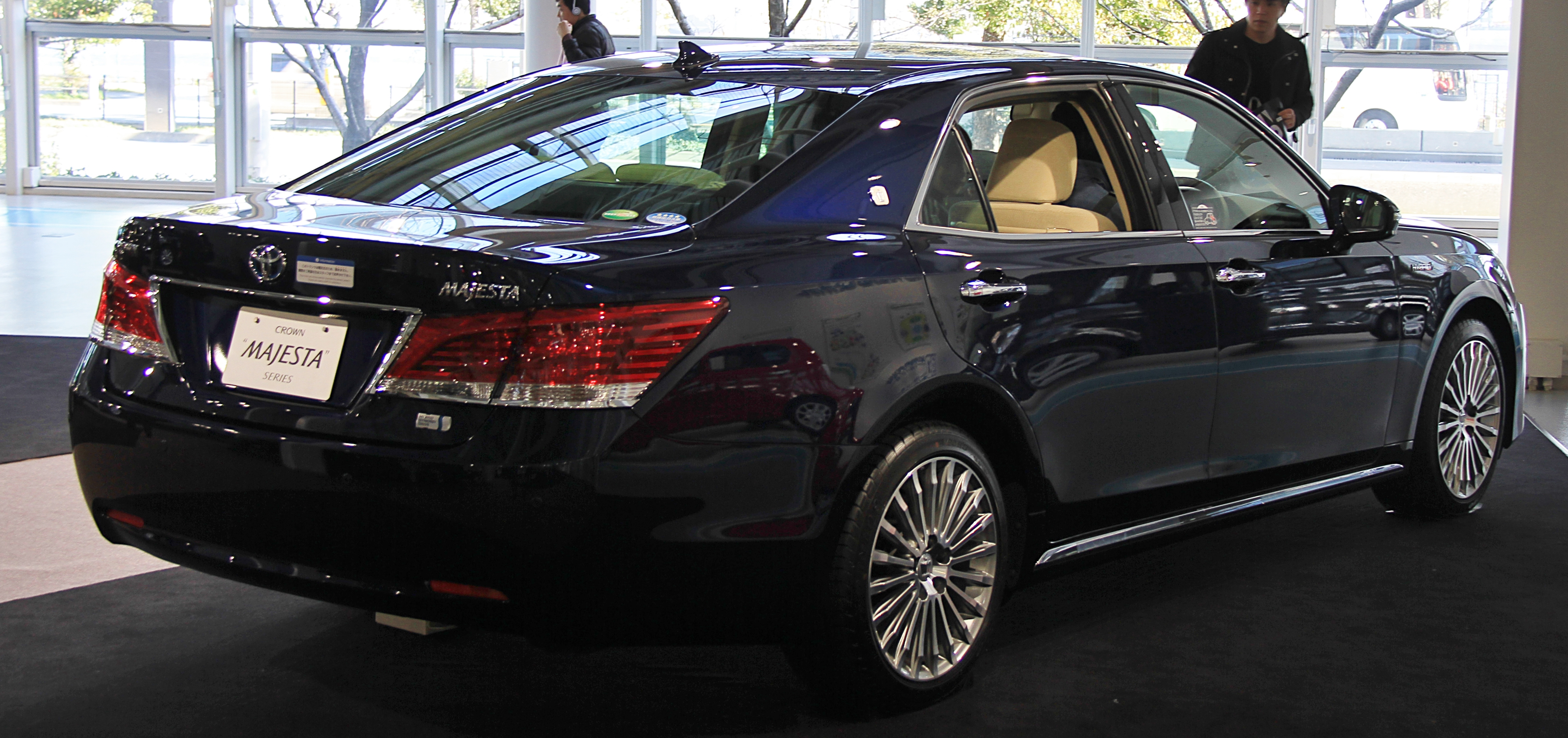
Rear view

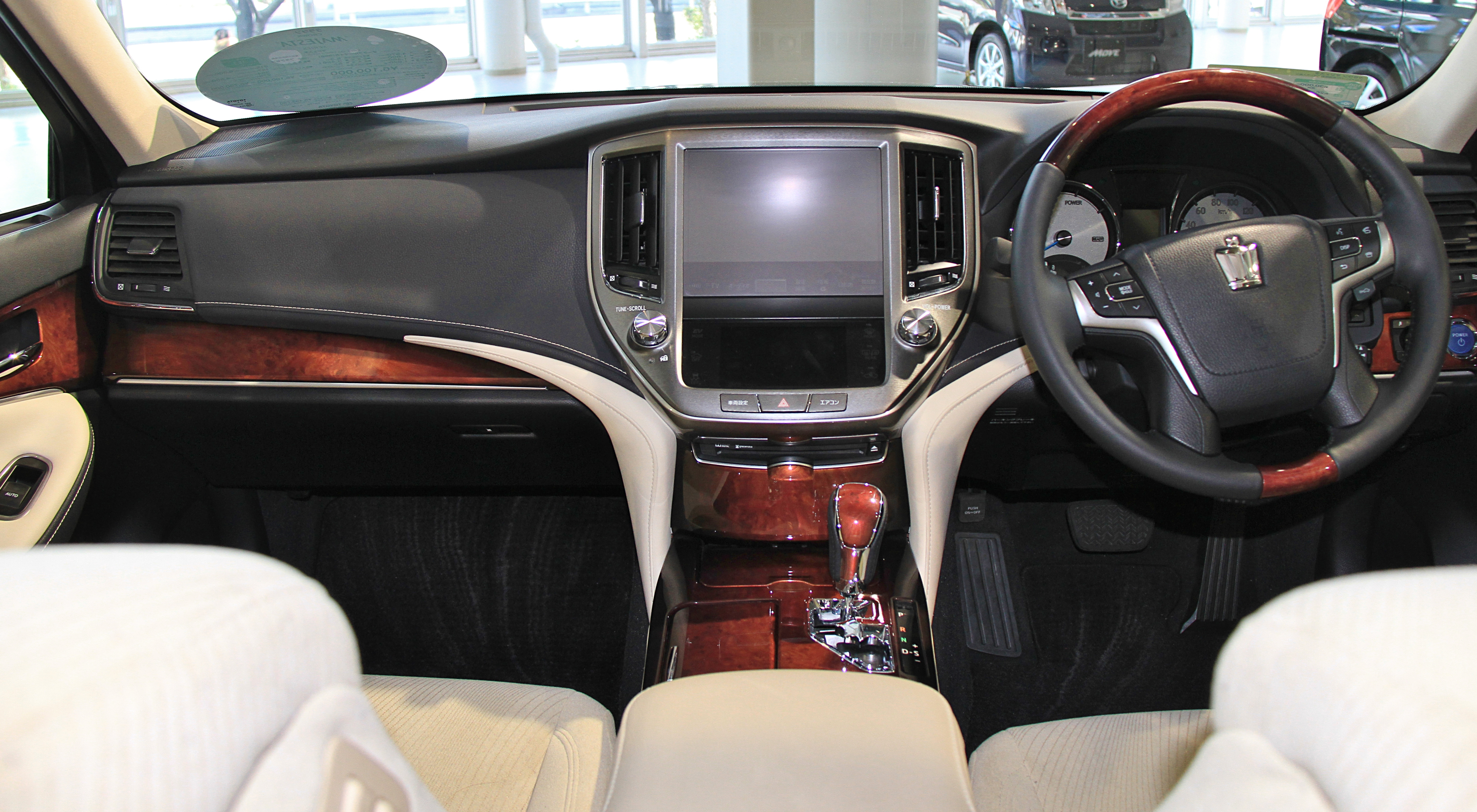
Interior

== Nameplate usage for other models ==
=== "Majesta" trim level for the Saudi market (2023–present) ===
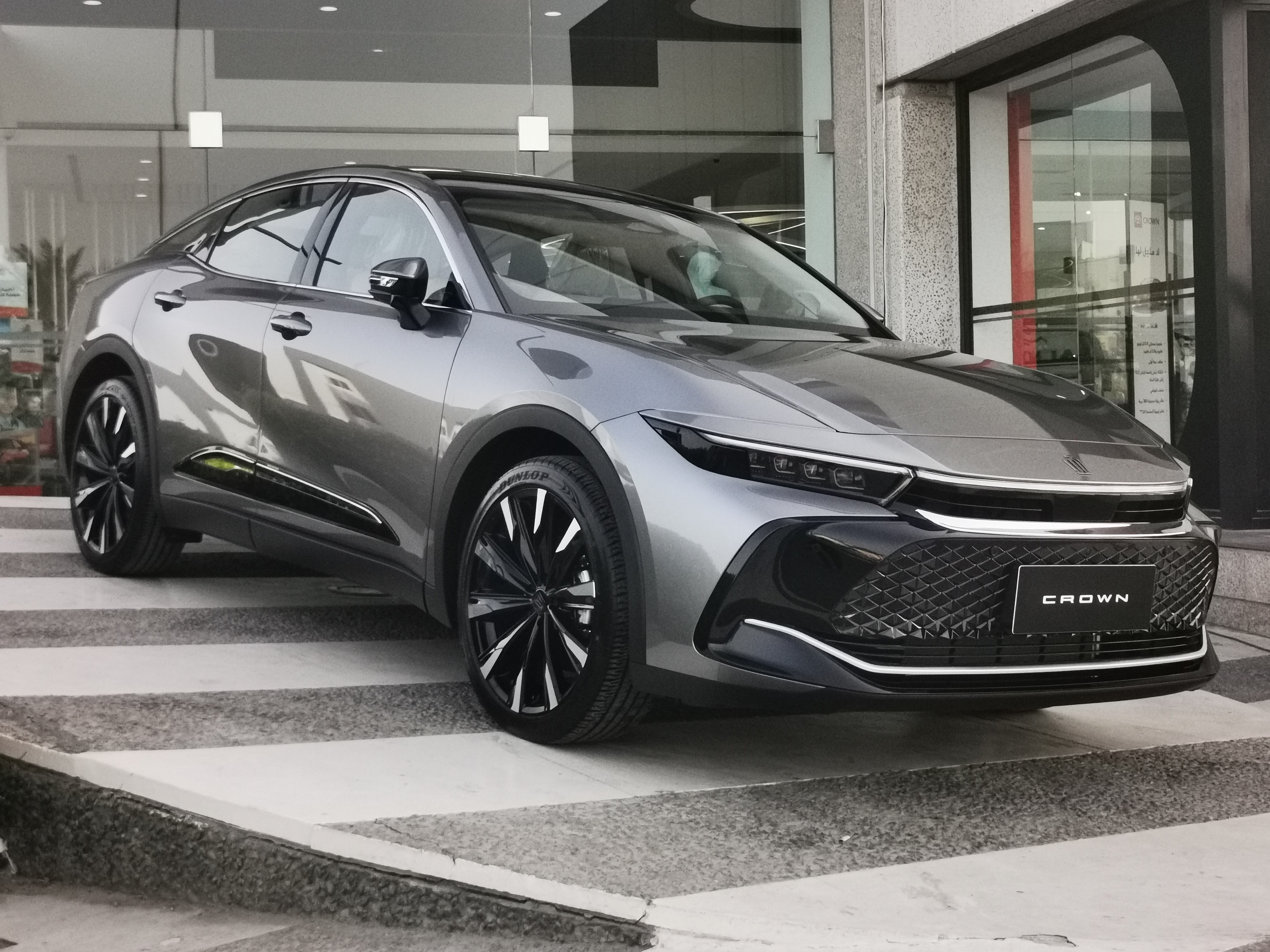
2023 Toyota Crown (Middle East)

In June 2023, Toyota revived the "Majesta" nameplate as a designation for the upper trim level of the sixteenth generation Crown Crossover sold in Saudi Arabia.
