= Hongqi EH7 =

Battery electric executive sedan

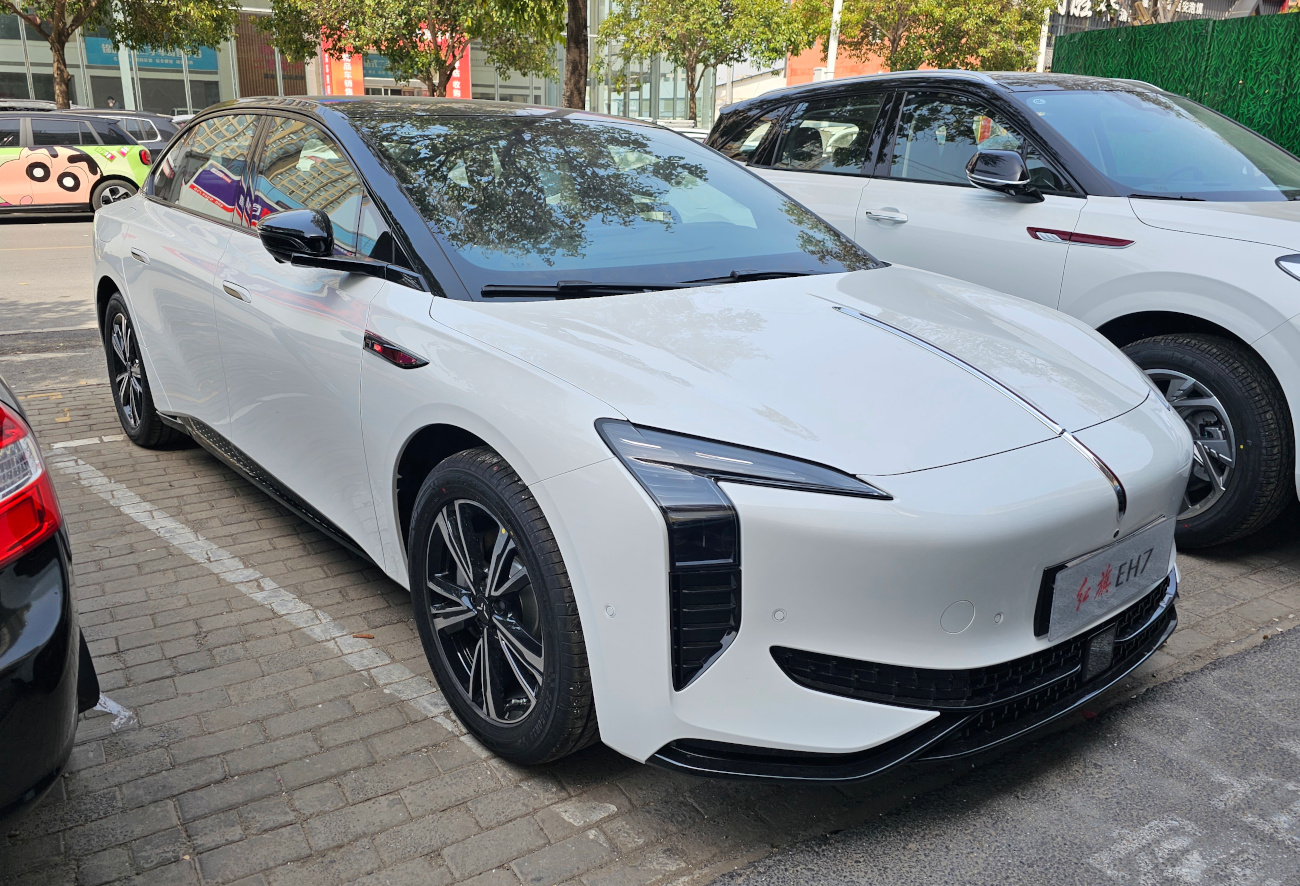

Overview
- Manufacturer: Hongqi (FAW Group)
- Also called: Hongqi Tiangong 07 (2026–present)
- Production: 2024–present
- Assembly: China: Changchun, Jilin

Body and chassis
- Class: Executive car (E)
- Body style: 4-door sedan
- Layout: Rear-motor, rear-wheel-drive; Dual-motor, all-wheel-drive
- Platform: FME

Powertrain
- Electric motor: Permanent magnet synchronous
- Power output: 253–455 kW (339–610 hp; 344–619 PS)
- Battery: 74.6 kWh LFP CANE; 74.7 kWh LFP FinDreams; 85 kWh Shenxing LFP CATL; 85.3 kWh LFP CANE; 111 kWh Qilin NMC CATL
- Electric range: 600–820 km (373–510 mi) (CLTC)

Dimensions
- Wheelbase: 3,000 mm (118.1 in)
- Length: 4,980 mm (196.1 in) (EH7); 5,000 mm (196.9 in) (Tiangong 07)
- Width: 1,915 mm (75.4 in)
- Height: 1,490 mm (58.7 in)
- Curb weight: 2,240 kg (4,938 lb)

Chronology
- Predecessor: Hongqi H7

The Hongqi EH7 (Chinese: 红旗EH7) is a battery electric executive sedan produced by Chinese automobile manufacturer Hongqi, a subsidiary of FAW Group.

== Overview ==
=== Hongqi E001 Concept ===
Originally was previewed as the Hongqi E001 Concept during the 2023 Auto Shanghai, the production EH7 was first shown at the 2024 Beijing Auto Show.

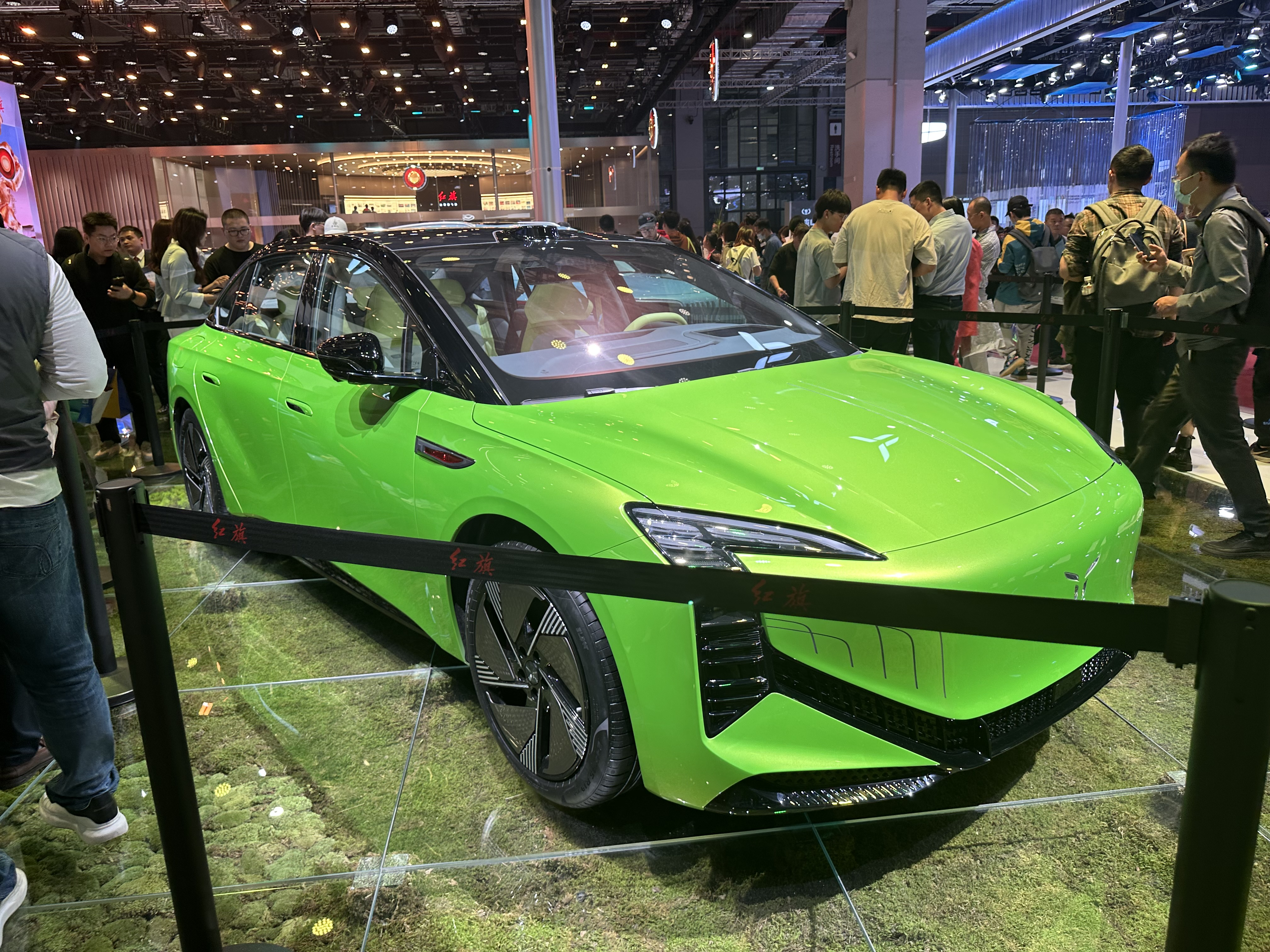
The Hongqi E001 Concept at Auto Shanghai 2023.

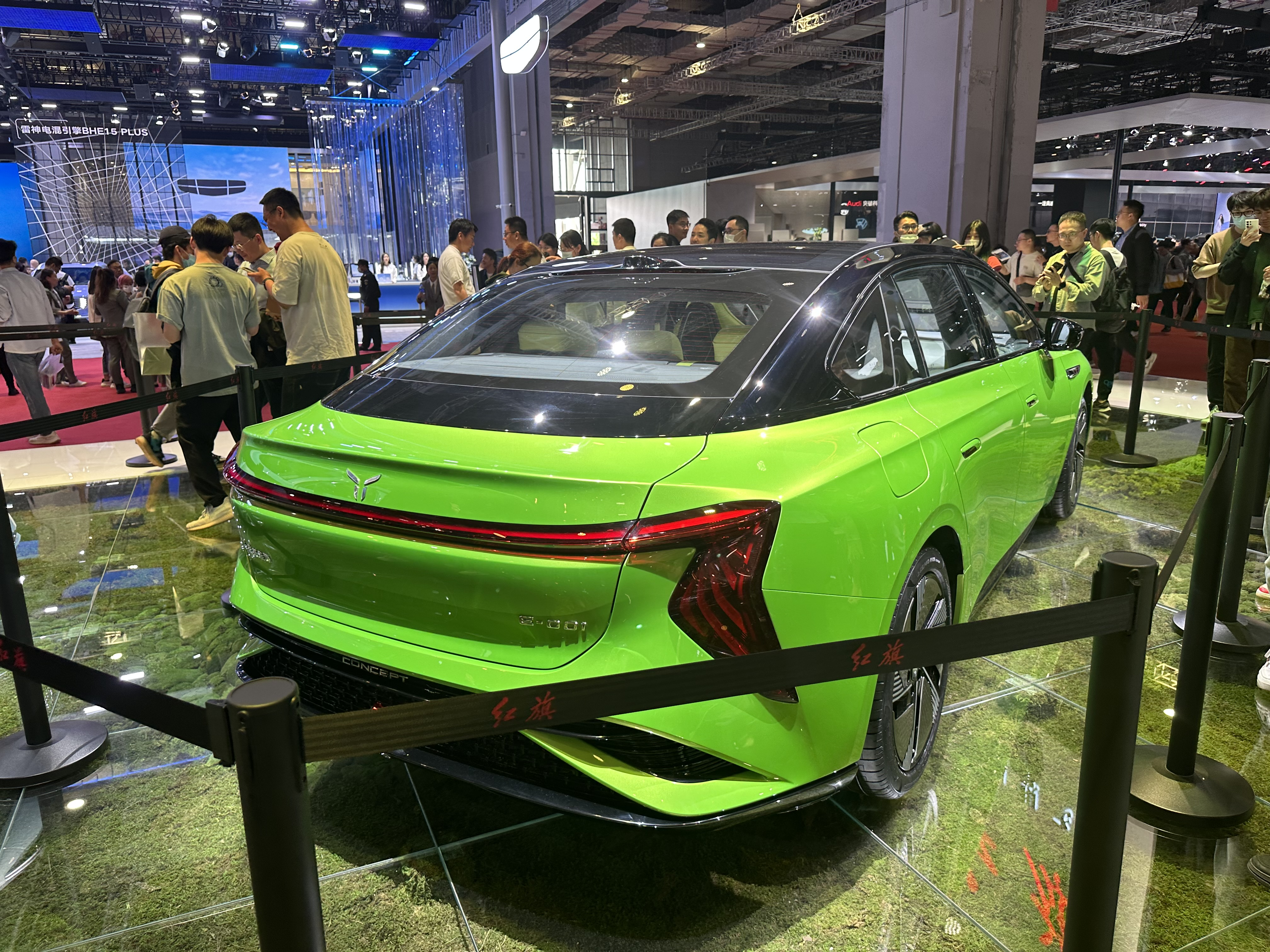
Rear view

=== Production model ===
On 20 March 2024, Hongqi New Energy was officially launched its EH7 sedan with a price range of 229,800–309,800 yuan, The EH7 is the first model of the new energy sub-brand under Hongqi.

On 14 October 2024, at 2024 Paris Motor Show, the EH7 was opened pre-sales for the European market.

The dashboard features a 6-inch LCD digital instrument panel display optionally paired with a heads-up display, along with a 15.5-inch central infotainment touchscreen integrated into the dashboard.

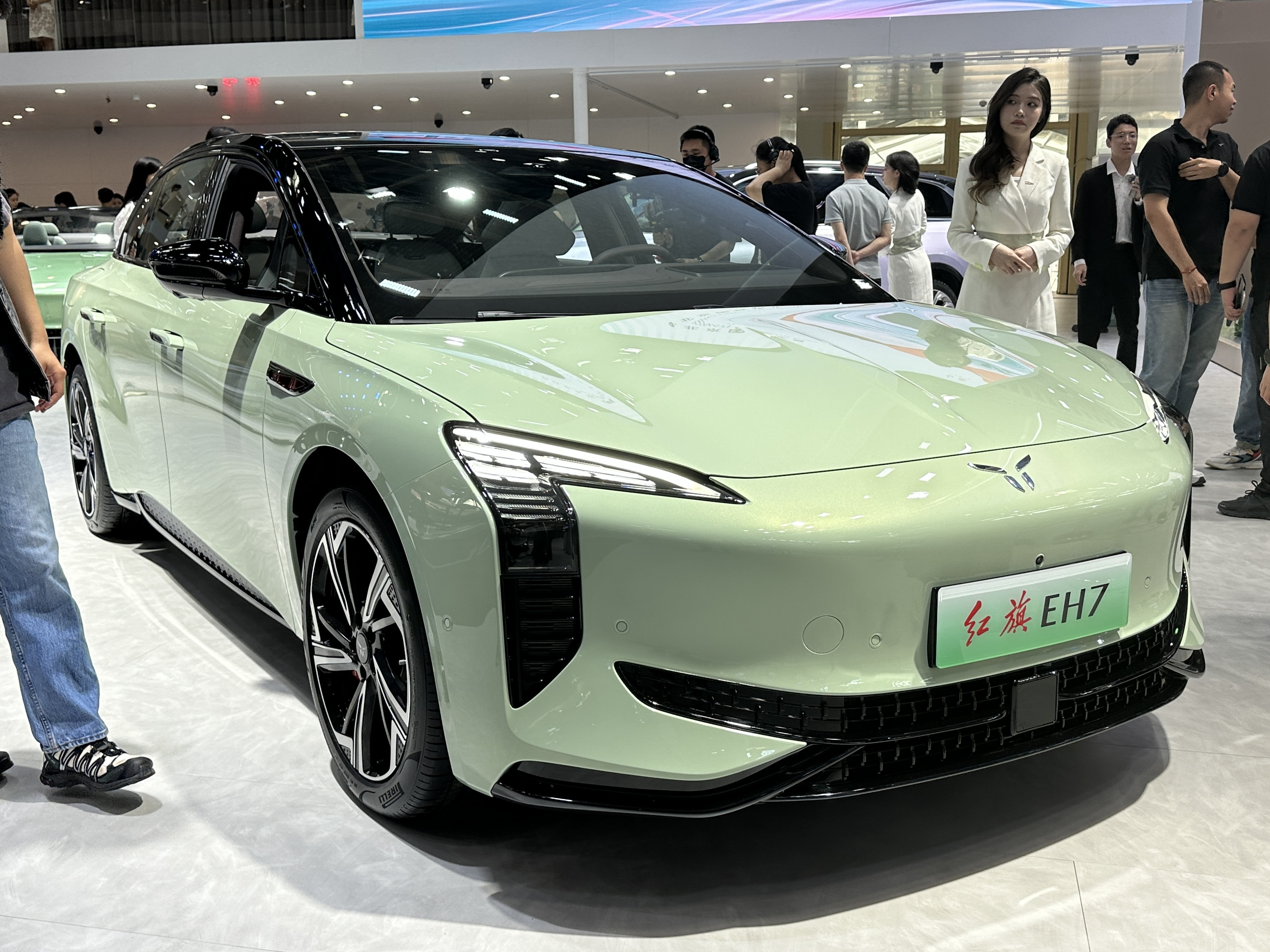
Hongqi EH7 (near-production model)

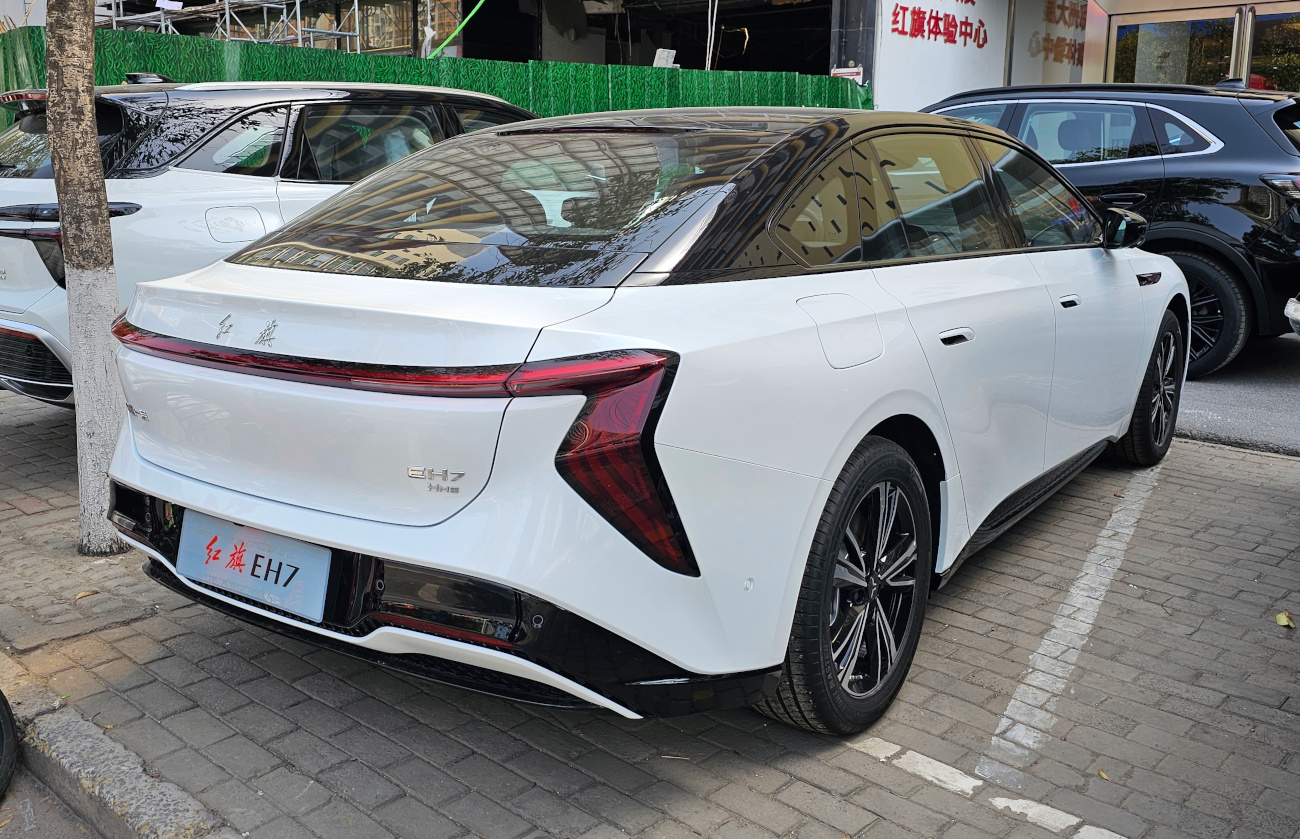
Rear view

== Powertrain ==
The EH7 is available with only battery-electric powertrains. All variants are equipped with a permanent magnet synchronous rear motor outputting 339 hp (253 kW; 344 PS) and 450 N⋅m (332 lb⋅ft) of torque, while all-wheel drive variants add a front permanent magnet motor outputting 271 hp (202 kW; 275 PS) and 306 N⋅m (226 lb⋅ft) of torque for a total of 611 hp (456 kW; 619 PS) and 756 N⋅m (558 lb⋅ft) of torque. The base variant is equipped with a 74.7 kWh LFP battery supplied by FinDreams which can recharge from 10–80% in 25 minutes, and is only available in rear-wheel drive for a CLTC range of 600 km (373 mi). This can be upgraded to an 85 kWh LFP pack using CATL's Shenxing technology which can recharge from 10–80% in 20 minutes and provides 690 and 640 km (429 and 398 mi) of CLTC range in rear- and all-wheel drive guises, respectively. The top variant uses a 111 kWh NMC622 pack using CATL's Qilin battery technology and also recharges within 20 minutes, and provides up to 820 km (510 mi) of CLTC range in rear-wheel drive form.

All-wheel drive variants also have a 6 mm (0.24 in) wider front and rear track of 1,651 and 1,661 mm (65.0 and 65.4 in), respectively.

Specifications
Battery		Motor		Power	Torque	Range		DC charging		0–100 km/h (62 mph)	Top speed	Kerb weight
Type	Weight	Front	Rear	Power	Torque	WLTP	CLTC	Peak	10–80%	0–100 km/h (62 mph)	Top speed	Kerb weight
74.7 kWh LFP FinDreams	500 kg (1,102 lb)	—	253 kW CAM220PT8 PMSM	339 hp (253 kW; 344 PS)	450 N⋅m (332 lb⋅ft)	—	600 km (373 mi)	190 kW	25 min	7.8 s	190 km/h (118 mph)	2,233 kg (4,923 lb)
85 kWh Shenxing LFP CATL	605 kg (1,334 lb)	—	253 kW CAM220PT8 PMSM	339 hp (253 kW; 344 PS)	450 N⋅m (332 lb⋅ft)	510 km (317 mi)	690 km (429 mi)	280 kW	20 min	6.2 s	190 km/h (118 mph)	2,240 kg (4,938 lb)
85 kWh Shenxing LFP CATL	605 kg (1,334 lb)	202 kW CAM190PT2 PMSM	253 kW CAM220PT8 PMSM	611 hp (456 kW; 619 PS)	756 N⋅m (558 lb⋅ft)	500 km (311 mi)	640 km (398 mi)	280 kW	20 min	4.2 s	190 km/h (118 mph)	2,360 kg (5,203 lb)
111 kWh Qilin NMC622 CATL	616 kg (1,358 lb)	—	253 kW CAM220PT8 PMSM	339 hp (253 kW; 344 PS)	450 N⋅m (332 lb⋅ft)	655 km (407 mi)	820 km (510 mi)	365 kW	20 min	5.8 s	190 km/h (118 mph)	2,254 kg (4,969 lb)
111 kWh Qilin NMC622 CATL	616 kg (1,358 lb)	202 kW CAM190PT2 PMSM	253 kW CAM220PT8 PMSM	611 hp (456 kW; 619 PS)	756 N⋅m (558 lb⋅ft)	640 km (398 mi)	760 km (472 mi)	365 kW	20 min	3.5 s	190 km/h (118 mph)	2,374 kg (5,234 lb)

== Hongqi Tiangong 07 ==
A major facelift of the EH7 was unveiled in August 2026 with the model now renamed as the Hongqi Tiangong 07 to better fit into the Tiangong series of NEV products. Compared with the original EH7, the Tiangong 07 has a much cleaner and simpler looking front and rear end styling.

Hongqi Tiangong 07

Rear view

Honqi says 74% of the chassis consists of high-strength steel including 2,000 MPa (290 ksi) steel collision reinforcements, and the roof can withstand 9 tons of weight.

The interior has been overhauled with new dashboard, center console, and door panels. The dashboard now has a 8.88-inch instrument display paired with an optional augmented-reality heads-up display, and the central infotainment touchscreen is now a free standing 17.3-inch 3K resolution unit, all powered by a Qualcomm Snapdragon 8397 SoC paired with 64GB of RAM and 512GB of storage. The center console now has a closed design to bridge between the dashboard and the storage armrest, which now uses a split-opening design. The seats have heating, ventilation, and massaging functions, and the front passenger seat has 16-way power adjustment; when fully reclined it measures 1,617 mm (63.7 in) in length. It has an 18-speaker Bose 7.1.4 surround sound system featuring speakers integrated into the front seat headrests, and a 1.87 m^{2} (20.1 sq ft) panoramic sunroof.

The ADAS system has been upgraded to the Hongqi Sinan 5.0 system with the addition of a 384-line dynamic variable zoom roof-mounted LiDAR and binocular front-facing cameras, and is capable of highway and urban assisted driving.

== Powertrain ==
Two battery sizes are available: 74.6 kWh for a CLTC range of 640 km (398 mi), and 85.3 kWh with CLTC ranges of 730 and 680 km (454 and 423 mi) for rear-wheel drive and all-wheel drive, respectively. Both battery packs use LFP cells supplied by FAW subsidiary China Automotive New Energy and use Hongqi's Xuanjia (Chinese: 玄甲; pinyin: xuán jiǎ; lit. 'black/mysterious armor') technology and are shared with the Tiangong 08, and can recharge from 10–80% in 12 minutes. The single motor variants have a rear positioned electric motor that produces 456 hp (340 kW; 462 PS) and 450 N⋅m (332 lb⋅ft) of torque, while the dual motor all-wheel drive variant adds a permanent magnet synchronous front motor outputting 255 hp (190 kW; 259 PS) and 320 N⋅m (236 lb⋅ft) of torque for a total of 711 hp (530 kW; 721 PS) and 770 N⋅m (568 lb⋅ft) of torque.

Specifications
Battery		Motor		Power	Torque	Range	10–80% time	0–100 km/h (62 mph)	Top speed	Kerb weight
Type	Weight	Front	Rear	Power	Torque	CLTC	10–80% time	0–100 km/h (62 mph)	Top speed	Kerb weight
74.6 kWh LFP CANE	546 kg (1,204 lb)	—	340 kW CAM220PT9 PMSM	456 hp (340 kW; 462 PS)	450 N⋅m (332 lb⋅ft)	640 km (398 mi)	12 min	5.6 s	200 km/h (124 mph)	2,130 kg (4,696 lb)
85.3 kWh LFP CANE	605 kg (1,334 lb)	—	340 kW CAM220PT9 PMSM	456 hp (340 kW; 462 PS)	450 N⋅m (332 lb⋅ft)	730 km (454 mi)	12 min	5.8 s	200 km/h (124 mph)	2,190 kg (4,828 lb)
85.3 kWh LFP CANE	605 kg (1,334 lb)	190 kW CAM190PT3 PMSM	340 kW CAM220PT9 PMSM	711 hp (530 kW; 721 PS)	770 N⋅m (568 lb⋅ft)	680 km (423 mi)	12 min	3.5 s	200 km/h (124 mph)	2,295 kg (5,060 lb)

== Sales ==
Year	China
2024	5,115
2025	2,212
