= HS9 =

HS9, HS-9, or HS.9 may refer to:

- HS9, in the HS postcode area, a postcode district in the Outer Hebrides, Scotland, United Kingdom
- HS9, the rocket used for the Hypersonic Flight Experiment
- Helicopter Anti-Submarine Squadron 9 (HS-9), the designation of two Helicopter Antisubmarine Warfare Squadrons of the United States Navy
- Hirtenberg HS.9, an Austrian two-seat touring aircraft
- Hispano-Suiza HS.9, a 20mm autocannon
- Hongqi E-HS9, a Chinese electric full-size SUV
- Hongqi HS9, a Chinese plug-in hybrid full-size SUV
