= Hongqi Guoyue =

Single-decker minibus

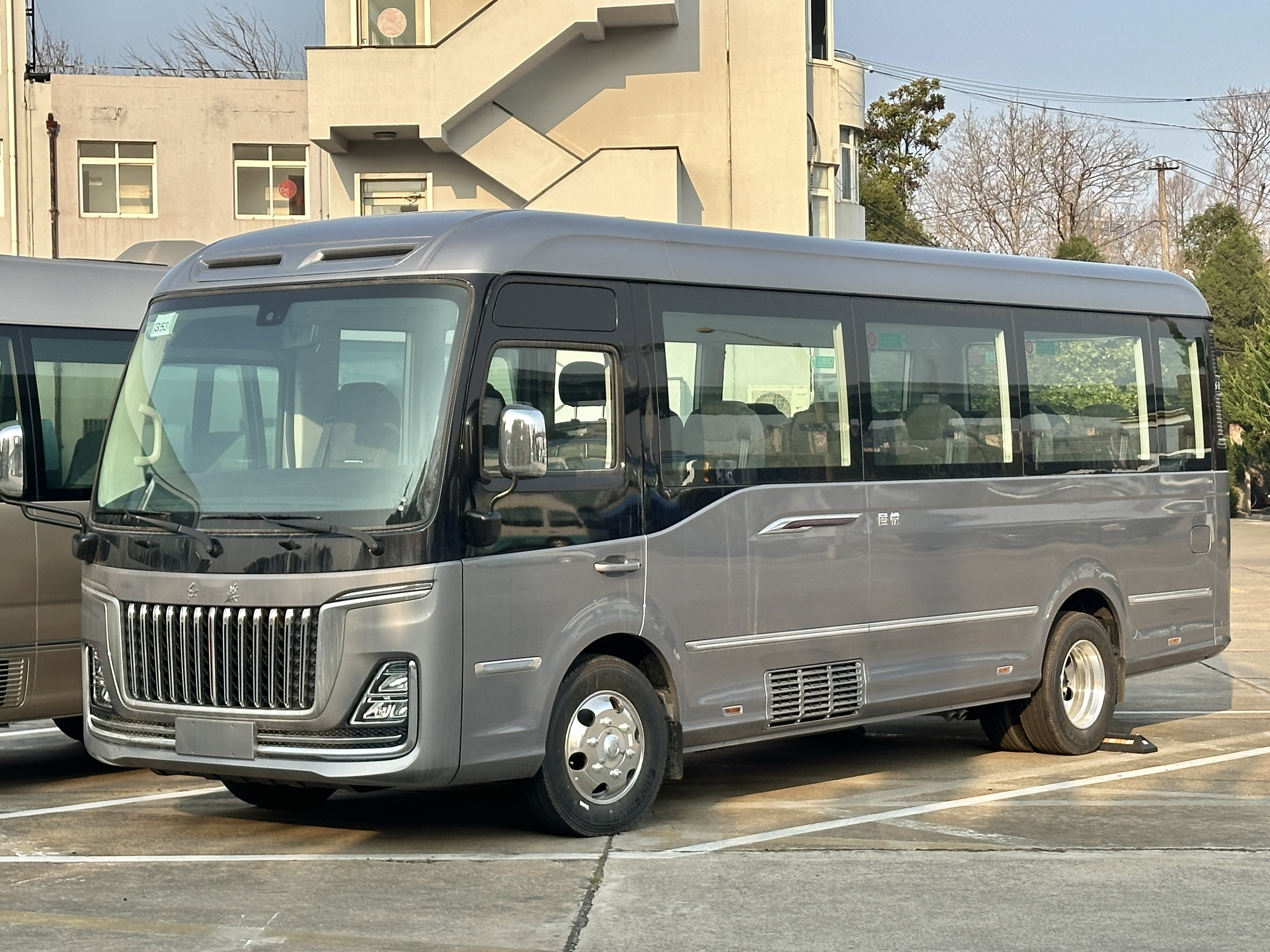

Overview
- Manufacturer: Hongqi (FAW Group)
- Also called: Hongqi QM7
- Production: 2023–present
- Assembly: China: Changchun, Jilin
- Designer: Giles Taylor

Body and chassis
- Class: Minibus
- Body style: Single-decker minibus
- Related: Hongqi L6

Powertrain
- Engine: 3.0 L CA6GV30TD-04 V6 turbocharged petrol
- Capacity: 17–23 seats
- Power output: 215 kW (292 PS; 288 hp)
- Transmission: 8-speed automatic

Dimensions
- Wheelbase: 3,990 mm (157.1 in)
- Length: 7,295 mm (287.2 in)
- Width: 2,090 mm (82.3 in)
- Height: 2,785 mm (109.6 in)
- Curb weight: 4,130 kg (9,105 lb)

Chronology
- Predecessor: Hongqi CA630

The Hongqi Guoyue (Chinese: 红旗国悦) or Hongqi QM7 is a single-decker minibus produced by Chinese automobile manufacturer Hongqi, a subsidiary of FAW Group.

== Overview ==
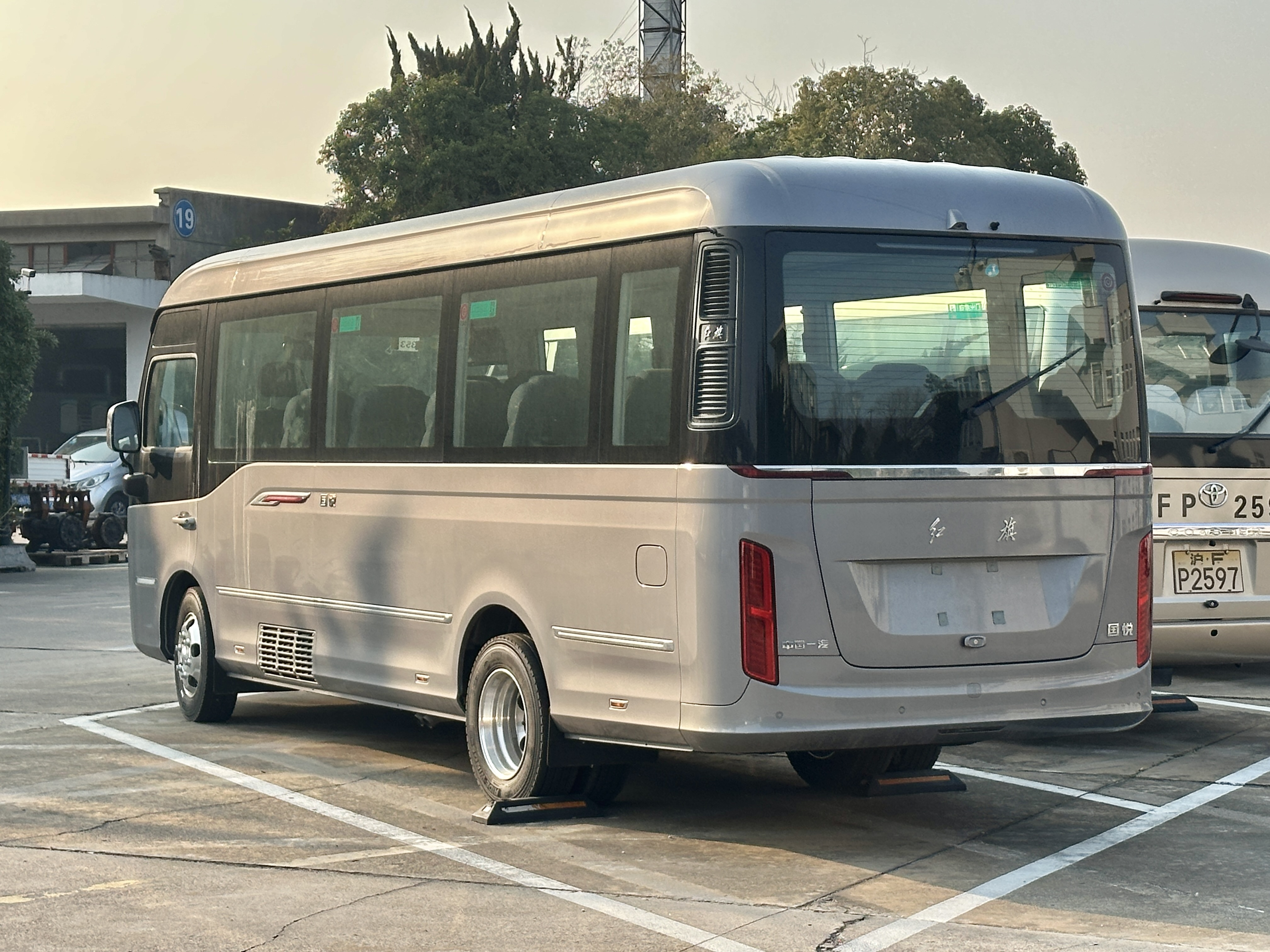
Rear view

On 27 March 2024, the Guoyue was officially launched in China. The Guoyue competes with Toyota Coaster and Yutong T7.

The body size of the Guoyue is 7295/2090/2785mm, the wheelbase is 3990mm, and the rated number of passengers (including the driver) is 17 or 23 seats.

The Guoyue is a 3.0-liter turbocharged V6 pumping out 292 hp and 308 lb-ft (420 Nm) of torque.
