= Hongqi HS6 =

Chinese plug-in hybrid mid-size luxury SUV

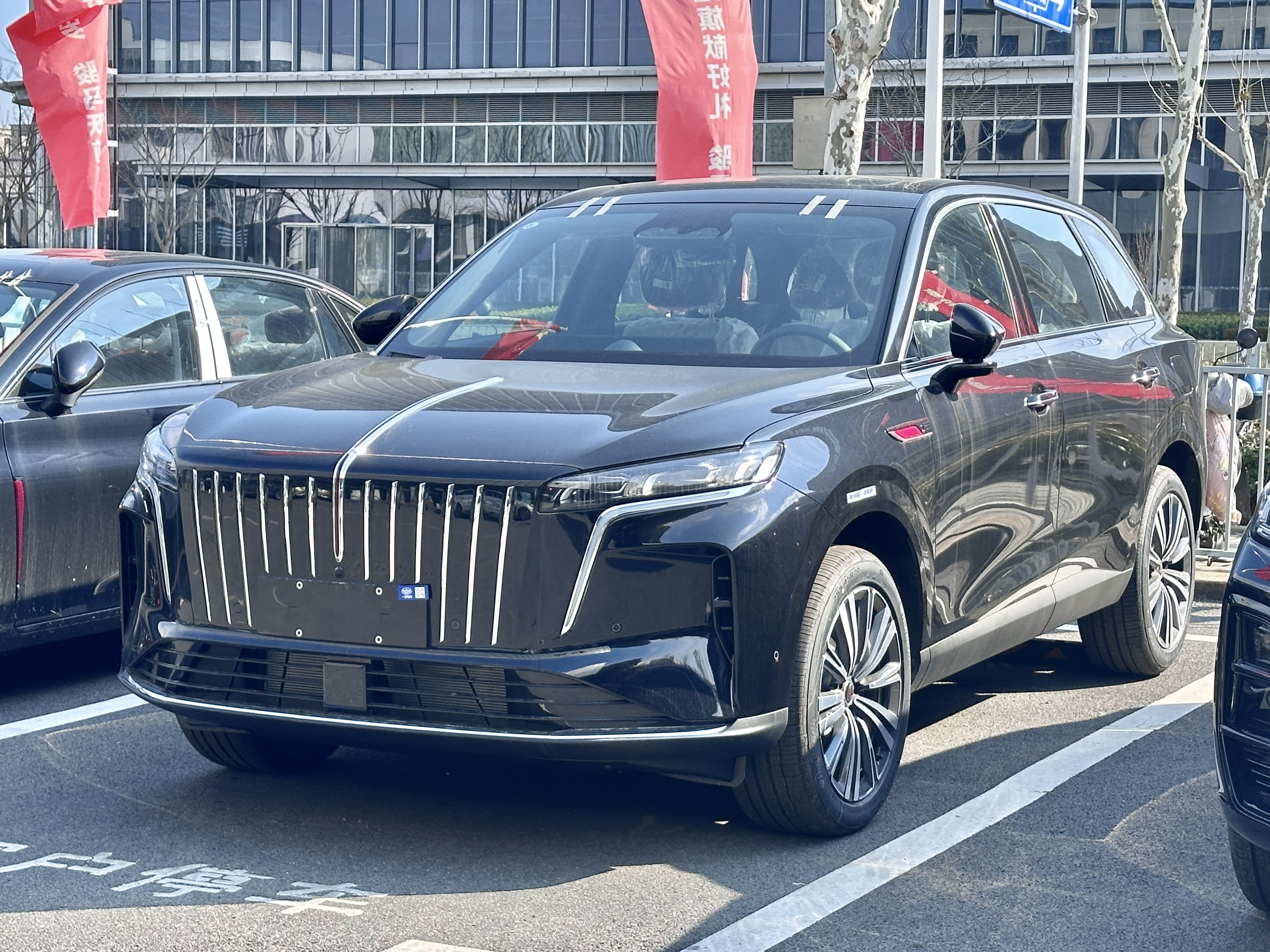

Overview
- Manufacturer: Hongqi (FAW Group)
- Production: 2025–present
- Assembly: China: Changchun, Jilin

Body and chassis
- Class: Mid-size luxury crossover SUV
- Body style: 5-door SUV
- Platform: Honggu Hybrid Platform (鸿鹄 混动平台)

Dimensions
- Wheelbase: 2,900 mm (114.2 in)
- Length: 4,900 mm (192.9 in)
- Width: 1,960 mm (77.2 in)
- Height: 1,730 mm (68.1 in)
- Curb weight: 1,755–1,805 kg (3,869–3,979 lb)

The Hongqi HS6 is a plug-in hybrid mid-size luxury crossover SUV produced by Chinese automobile manufacturer Hongqi, a subsidiary of FAW Group from 2025. The HS6 was unveiled on September 19, 2025. It has been sold on the Chinese market since December 16, 2025. The model was developed under the direction of designers including Giles Taylor, formerly of Rolls-Royce, reflecting Hongqi's push toward more globally competitive design standards.

== Overview ==
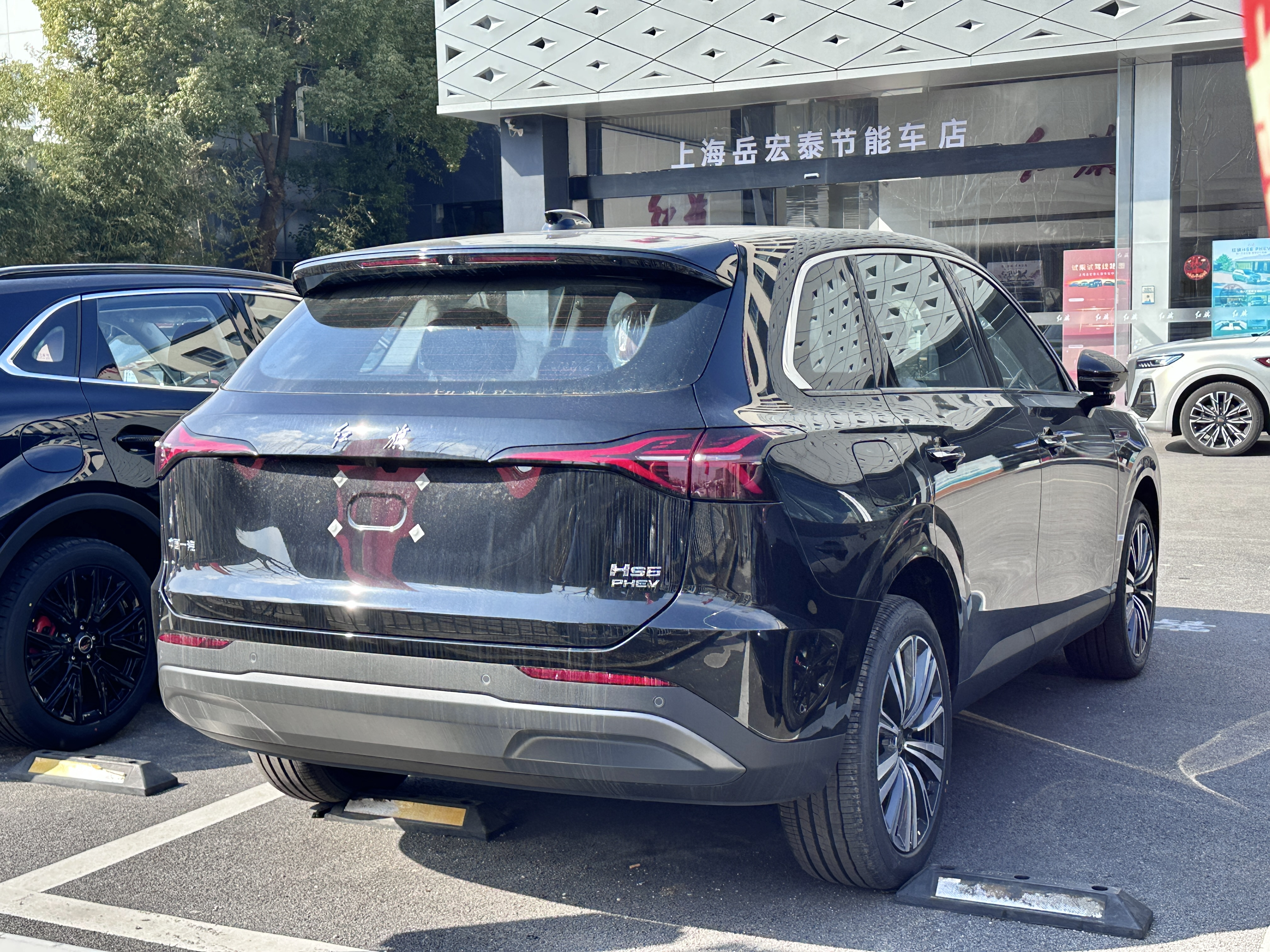
Rear view

The HS6 was positioned above the Hongqi HS5 and serves as a more technologically advanced and electrified offering in the brand's SUV range. The vehicle is built on Hongqi's dedicated plug-in hybrid architecture, reflecting the company's increasing focus on long-range hybrid systems as a bridge between internal combustion and fully electric vehicles.

== Powertrain ==
The HS6 is equipped with a plug-in hybrid powertrain combining a turbocharged 1.5-litre petrol engine with electric motors.

Multiple drivetrain configurations are offered, including front-wheel drive and all-wheel drive variants. The system is designed to deliver both strong performance and extended driving range, a key competitive factor in China's hybrid SUV market.

== Performance and range ==
In November 2025, the HS6 set a Guinness World Record for the longest distance traveled by a plug-in hybrid SUV without refueling or recharging, covering 2,327 km between Shangri-La and Guangzhou.

The test route included significant elevation changes, highlighting the vehicle's efficiency under varied driving conditions.

== Technology ==
The HS6 features an intelligent cockpit system incorporating artificial intelligence technologies developed in collaboration with Alibaba Cloud.

The system enables voice interaction, contextual assistance, and integration with cloud-based services, reflecting broader industry trends toward software-defined vehicles.
