= Hongqi (marque) =

Chinese luxury car brand owned by FAW Group

- Hongqi's logo, a calligraphic inscription of its brand name in simplified Chinese, handwritten by Mao Zedong.

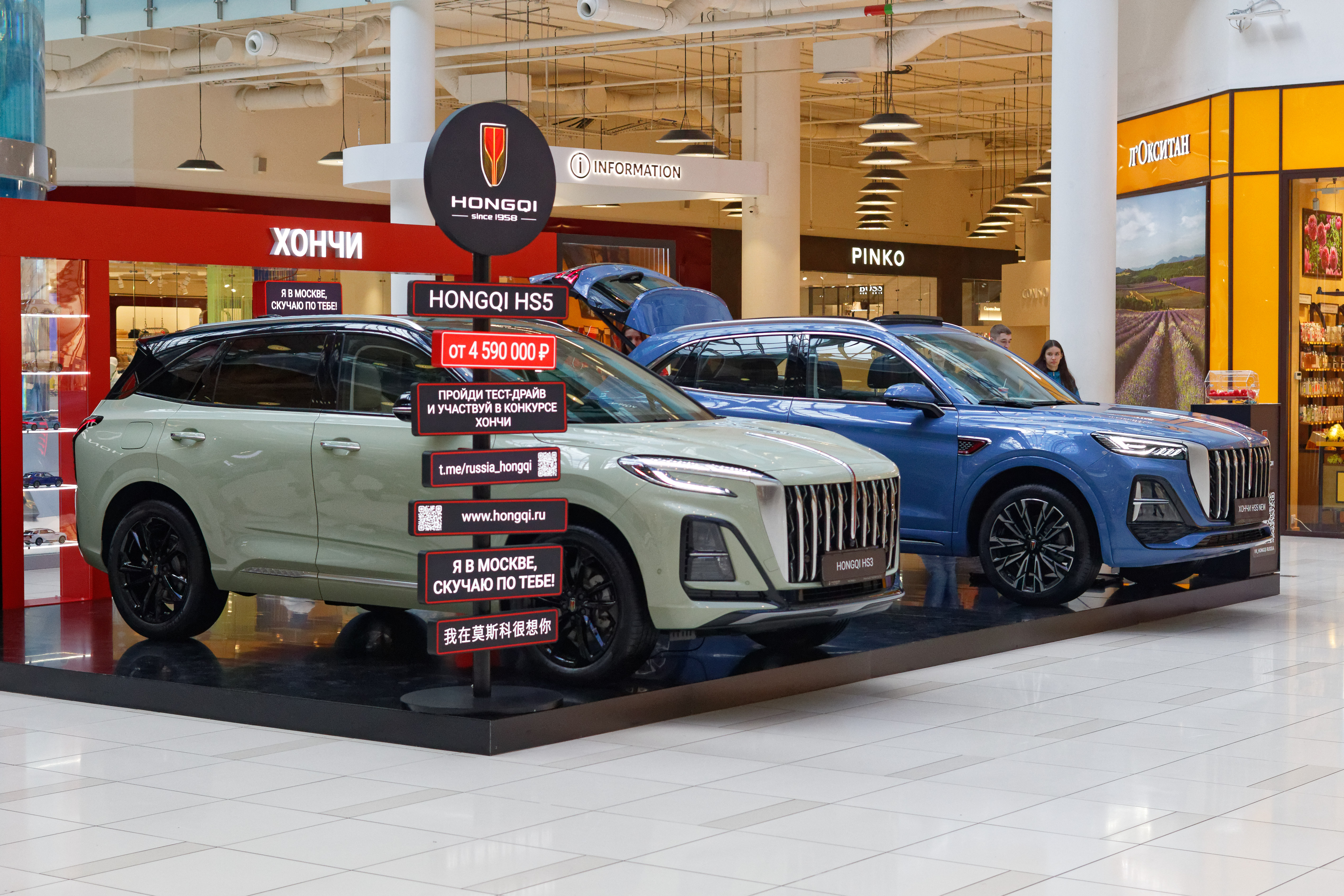
- Hongqi's demo at Moscow. Hongqi HS3 (green), and Hongqi HS5 (blue) are showed off.
- Native name: 红旗
- Type: Division
- Industry: Automotive
- Founded: 1958; 68 years ago
- Headquarters: Changchun, Jilin, China
- Area served: Worldwide
- Key people: Liu Jifang (representative); Giles Taylor (chief design officer); Cheng Zhang (Director of Hongqi in the Middle East)
- Products: Automobiles; Luxury vehicles
- Parent: FAW Group
- Website: hongqi.faw.cn

Hongqi (Chinese: 红旗; pinyin: Hóngqí) is a Chinese luxury car brand which is owned and operated by FAW Group. Hongqi was launched in 1958, making it the oldest Chinese passenger car brand. In Chinese, hongqi means "red banner."

Originally, Hongqi models were made exclusively for high-ranking government officials. They ceased production in 1981, but were later resurrected in the mid-1990s.

== History ==
=== Origins to 1991 ===
Logo of Hongqi, handwritten by Mao Zedong in 1958.

While the name has endured, the vehicles that bear the brand name have varied significantly. Originally a dignitary's car, the brand's later vehicles have ranged from serving as taxis to low-end business sedans; during the 60th anniversary of the People's Republic of China parade, the brand returned to its roots by carrying party leaders.

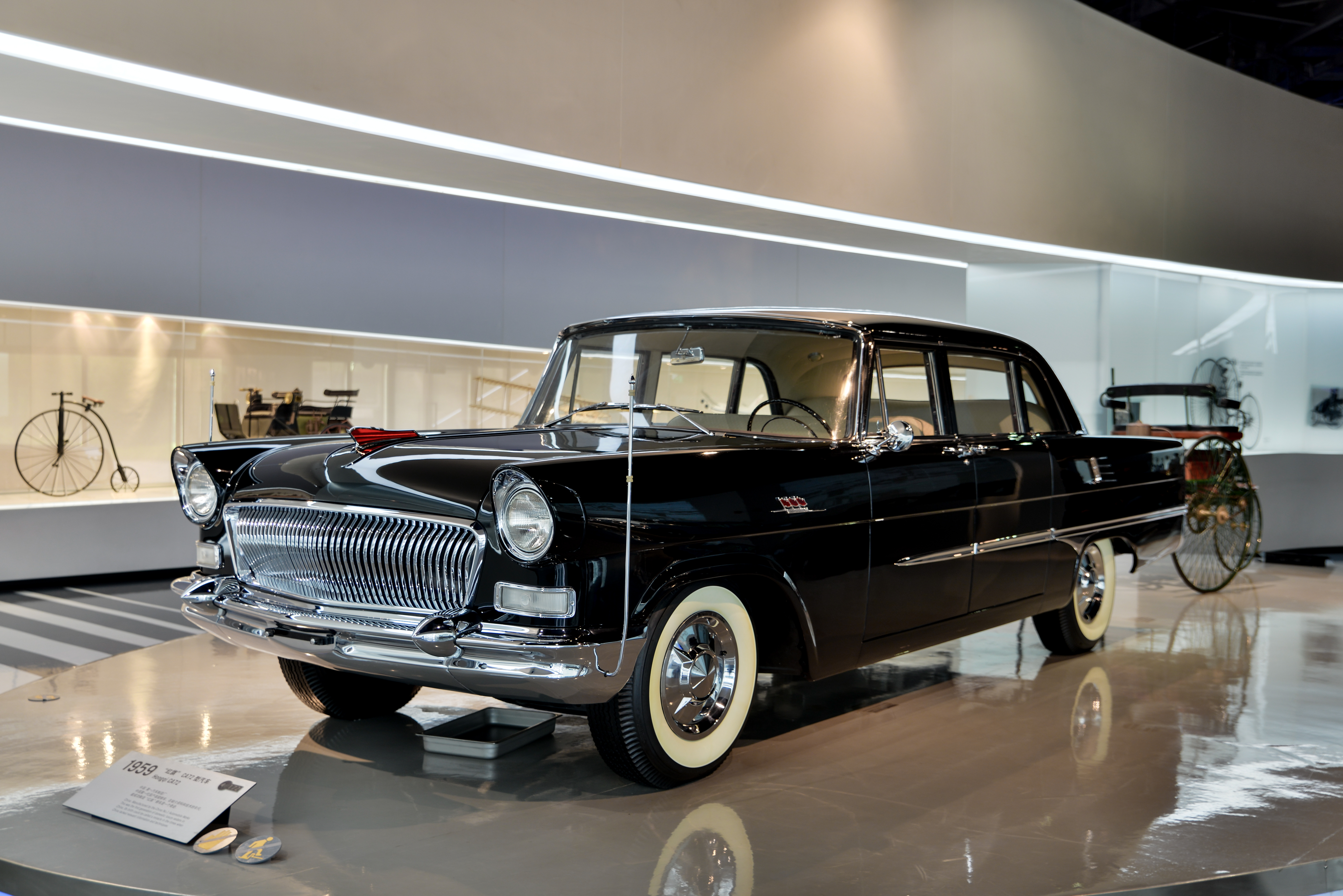
Hongqi CA72

The original Hongqi cars were a luxury item used for the transport of foreign dignitaries and the party elite. Although Chairman Mao Zedong claimed not to have been driven in a Hongqi until Nixon's 1972 visit, he did take a personal interest in the cars from the beginning.

Introduced on 1 August 1958, the first Hongqi was the CA72. By September, a convertible version intended to be used by dignitaries in National Day parades had appeared. The CA72's design was based on a 1955 Chrysler. From the beginning, the full-size Hongqi was equipped with a 147 kW (200 PS; 197 hp) V8 engine. The grille was based on a traditional design of a Chinese fan and remains in use on Hongqis today.

First introduced in 1963, the CA770 had remained in production until 1980, albeit in limited numbers. Around 1,600 of these V8-engined Hongqis were built in total, and over the years, various versions were released, including a 1965 long-wheelbase model with three rows of seats and a 1969 armored version (CA772).

=== 1991 to 2018 ===
Between 1995 and 2006, foreign products were manufactured in China and sold as Hongqi models. These included the Audi 100 (CA7200/CA7220) and the Lincoln Town Car (CA7460). There were two Audi 100-based versions—the more luxurious "Century Star" and the smaller (1.8-litre) Hongqi Mingshi.

FAW began production of the third generation of Hongqi vehicles in 2006. Named the HQ3 and based on the Toyota Crown Majesta, it saw little market success. First year sales totaled near 500, and while the target for the second year was 1,400 units, the HQ3 would not be profitable until annual sales of 5,000 were reached. By October 2007, the price was reduced considerably and the name changed to Shengshi ("Days of Prosperity") in order to better appeal to private buyers. Sales during the first half of 2007 were all from inventory and totalled 788.

Debuting by 2013, 30,000 units of the latest Hongqi model were initially expected to be produced, though a year after launch, less than 5,000 had been sold. Sales are through government procurement; the car is billed as "the official car for minister-level officials." In 2014, the People's Liberation Army purchased at least 1,000 H7 models. A much more expensive model, the L5, was also on sale alongside the H7.

=== 2018 to present ===
The logo of Golden Sunflower for Hongqi's ultra luxury product line

FAW Group held the "Hongqi Brand Strategy Conference" in Beijing's Great Hall of the People on the evening of 8 January 2018. In this conference, the new Hongqi design was released, with a concept car model on display. A new logo was also released at the same time.

In September 2018, British car designer Giles Taylor joined the FAW Group as Global Vice President of Design and Chief Creative Officer for Hongqi. From 2018 to 2021, the brand experienced extremely high growth, from 33,000 units in 2018 to over 100,000 in 2019, over 200,000 in 2020, and over 300,000 in 2021, a growth of 63 times in 4 years.

On 8 January 2023, the Hongqi brand released its global strategy for new energy vehicles.

In 2023, Hongqi launched two product lines, "Hongqi Golden Sunflower" and "Hongqi New Energy", based on the main brand, focusing on ultra-luxury cars and pure electric cars respectively.

In 2023, the brand re-entered the minibus market for the first time since selling the Hongqi CA630 minibus in the 1980s, with the 23-seat Hongqi QM7.

In 2023, FAW had internally announced the establishment of the Hongqi Brand Operations Committee and carried out a series of organizational and personnel adjustments.

== Current products ==
=== Marketed vehicles ===
For the general public sale, Hongqi has three product lines: the Golden Sunflower series for ultra luxury models, the Energy-Saving series is for the transitional internal combustion engine models, and the New Energy series for electric models.

==== Golden Sunflower ====
- Guoli/L5 ultra-luxury full-size sedan, ICE
- Guoya/L1 luxury full-size sedan, HEV
- Guoyao/LS7 luxury full-size SUV, ICE
- Guoyue/QM7 single-decker minibus, ICE

==== Sedans ====
- E-QM5 compact sedan, EV
- H5 compact sedan, ICE/HEV/PHEV
- Tiangong 05/EH5 compact sedan, EV
- H6 mid-size liftback sedan, ICE
- EH7 mid-size sedan, EV
- H7 full-size sedan, PHEV
- H9 full-size sedan, ICE

==== SUVs ====
- HS3 compact SUV, ICE/PHEV
- Tiangong 06/EHS5 compact SUV, EV
- HS5 mid-size SUV, ICE/PHEV
- HS6 mid-size SUV, PHEV
- HS7 mid-size SUV, ICE/PHEV
- Tiangong 08/EHS7 mid-size SUV, BEV
- HS9 full-size SUV, PHEV
- E-HS9 full-size SUV, BEV

==== MPV ====
- HQ9 full-size MPV, ICE/PHEV
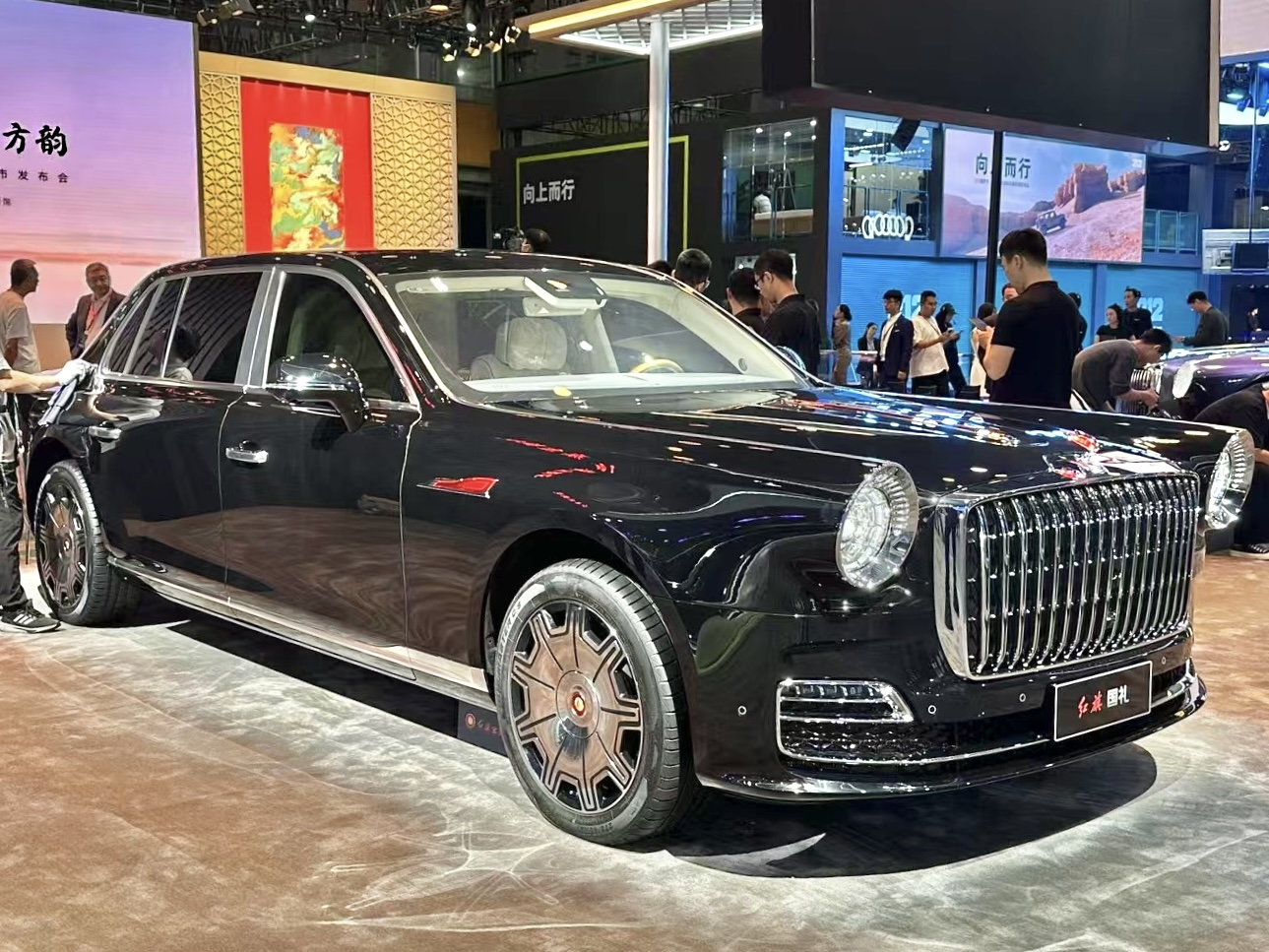
Hongqi Guoli

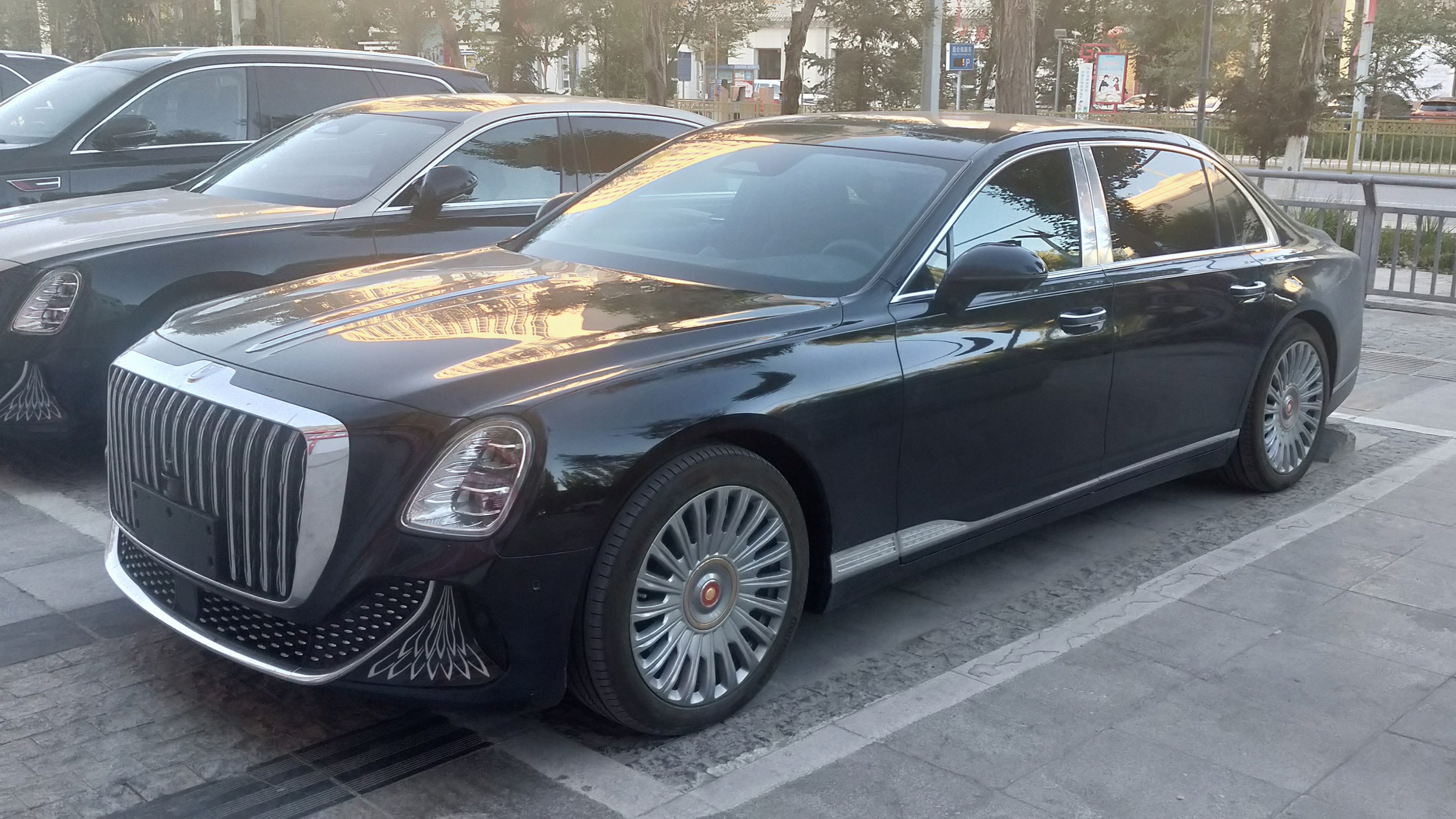
Hongqi Guoya

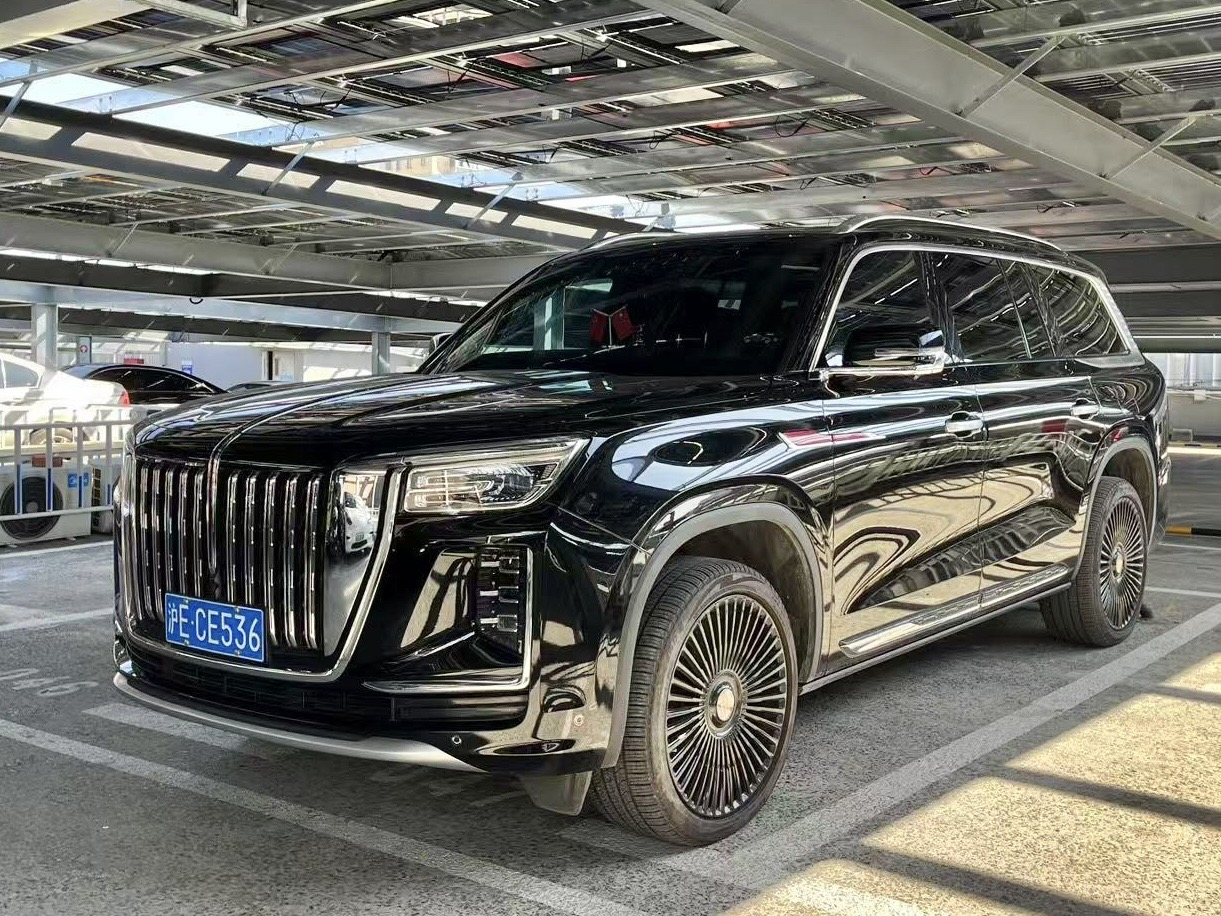
Hongqi Guoyao

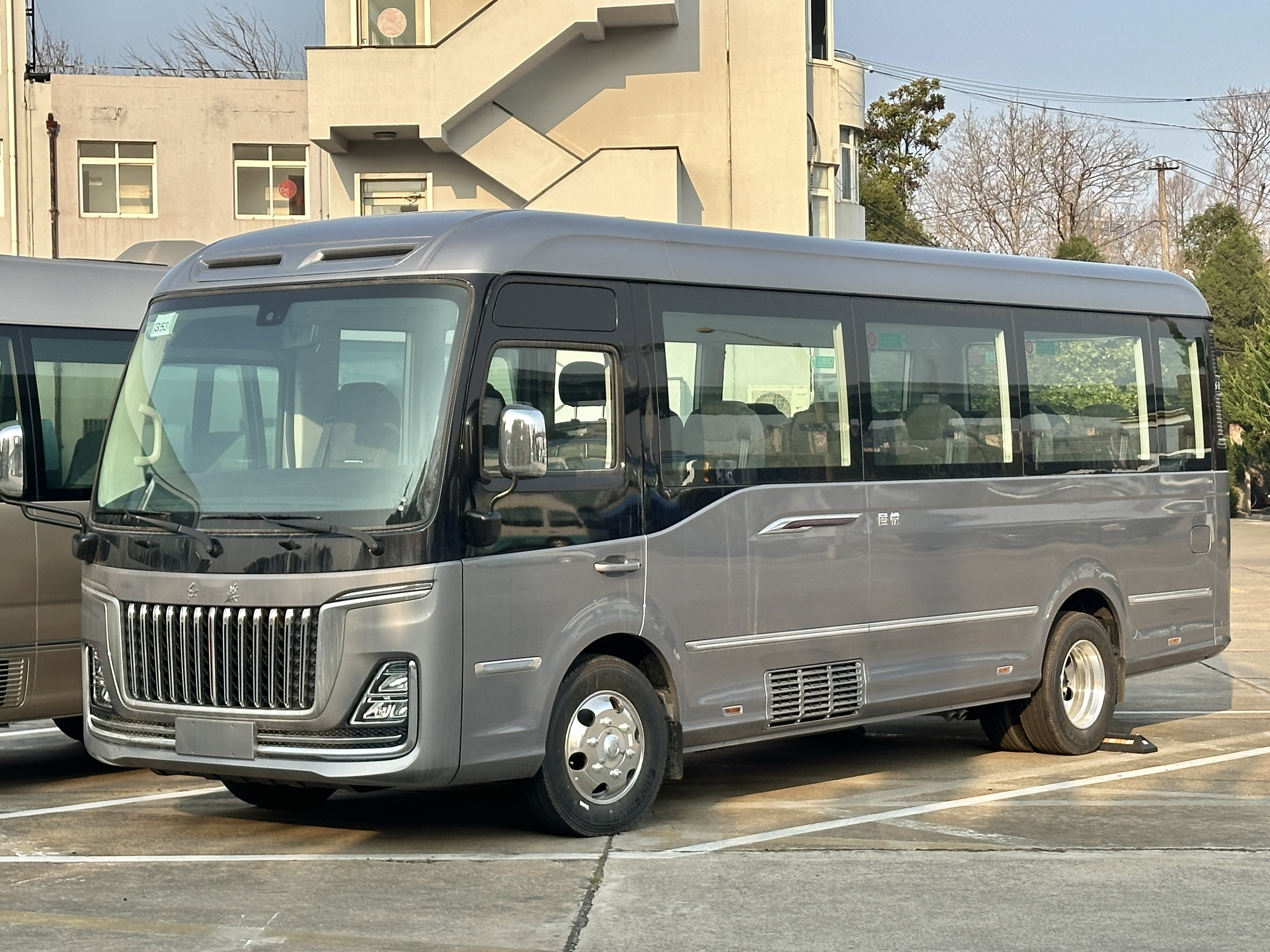
Hongqi Guoyue

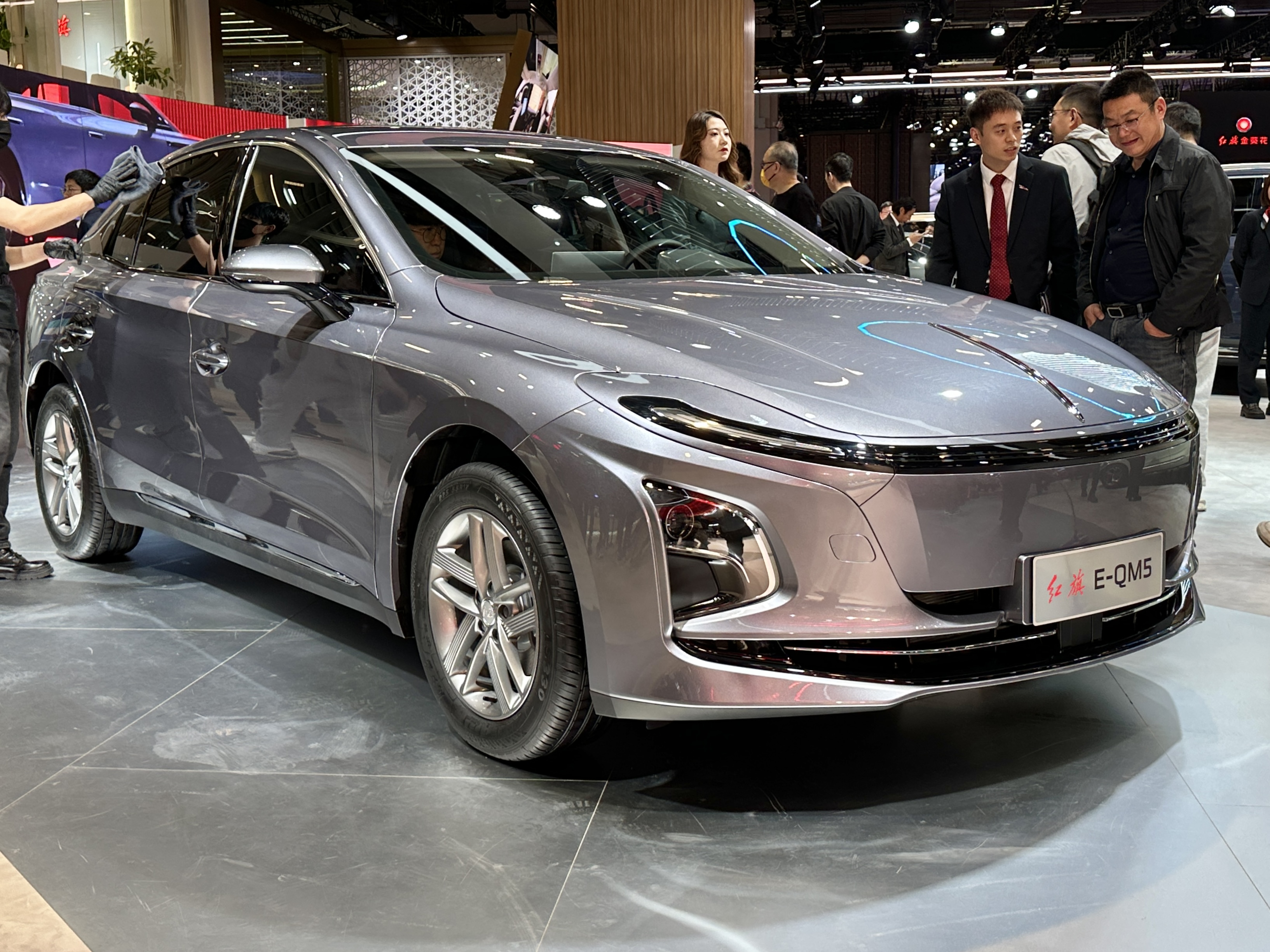
Hongqi E-QM5

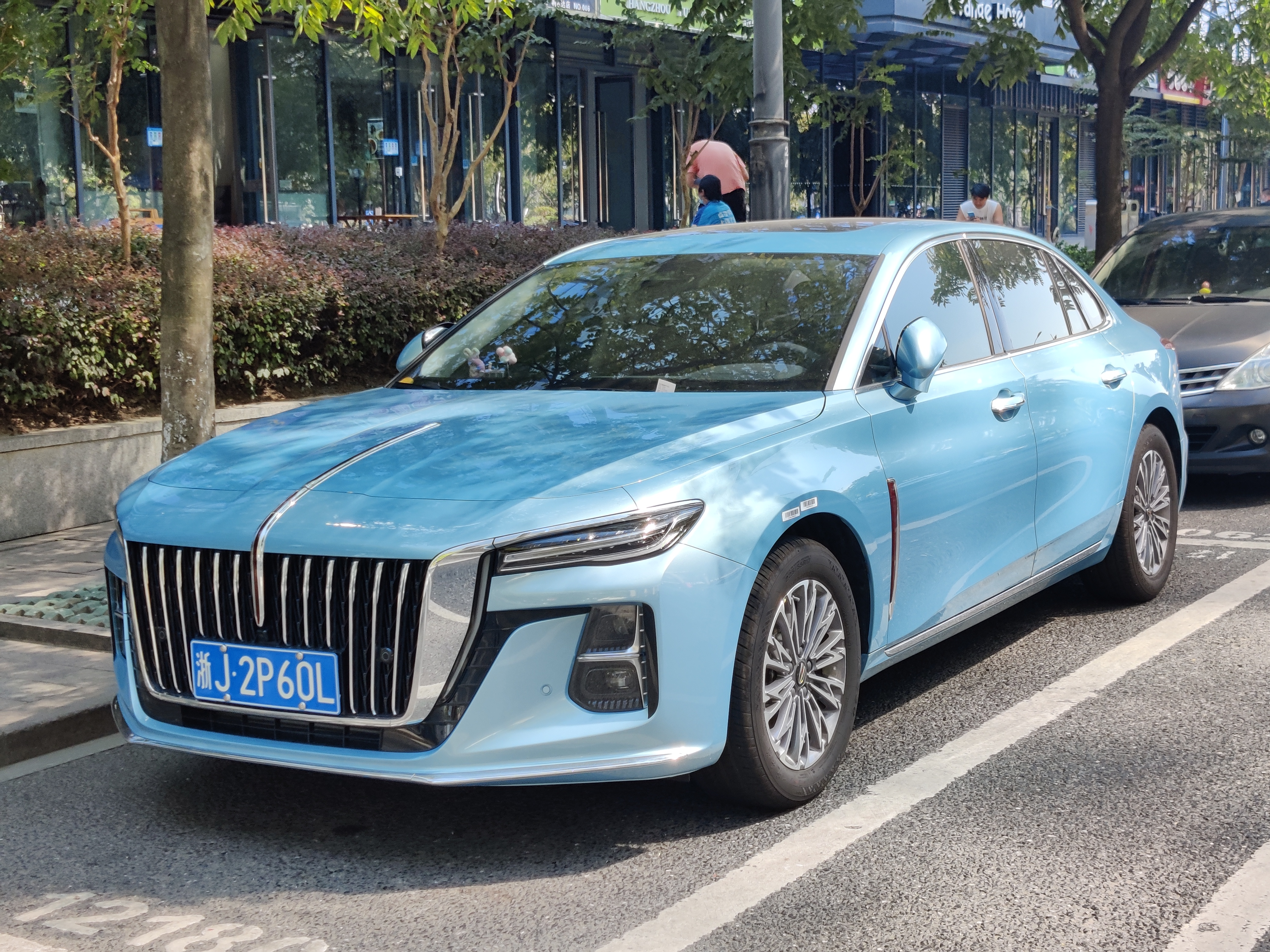
Hongqi H5

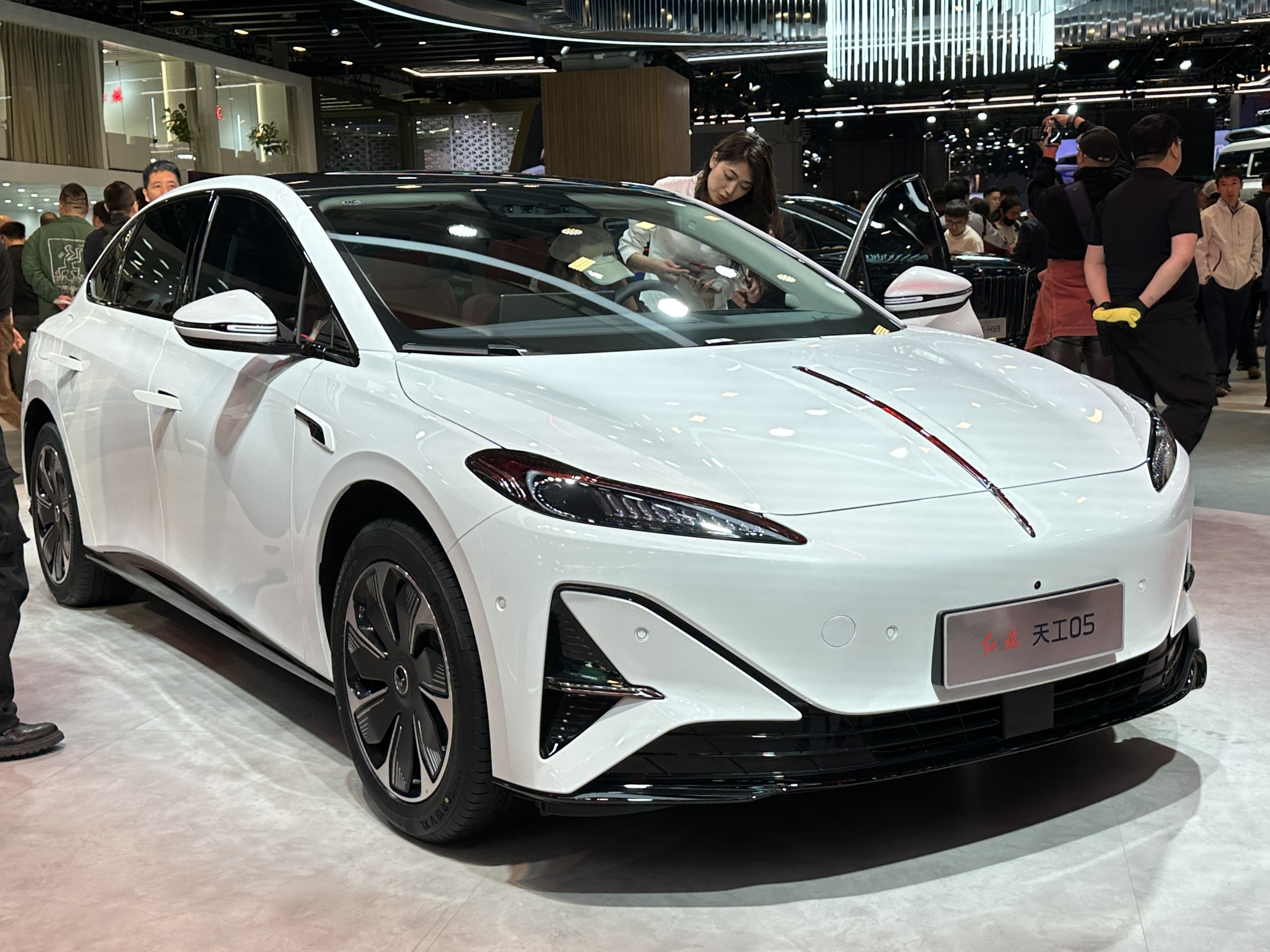
Hongqi Tiangong 05

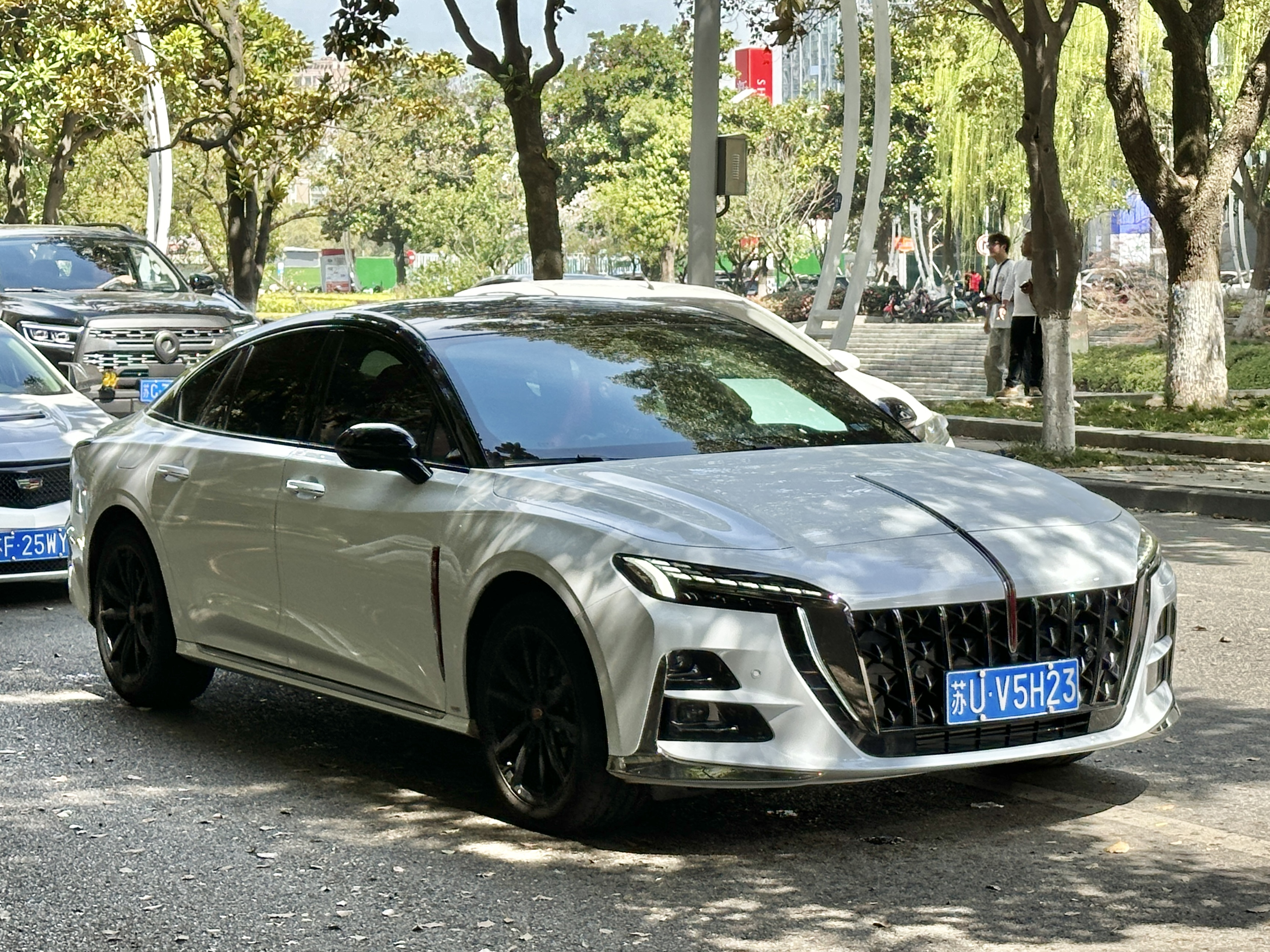
Hongqi H6

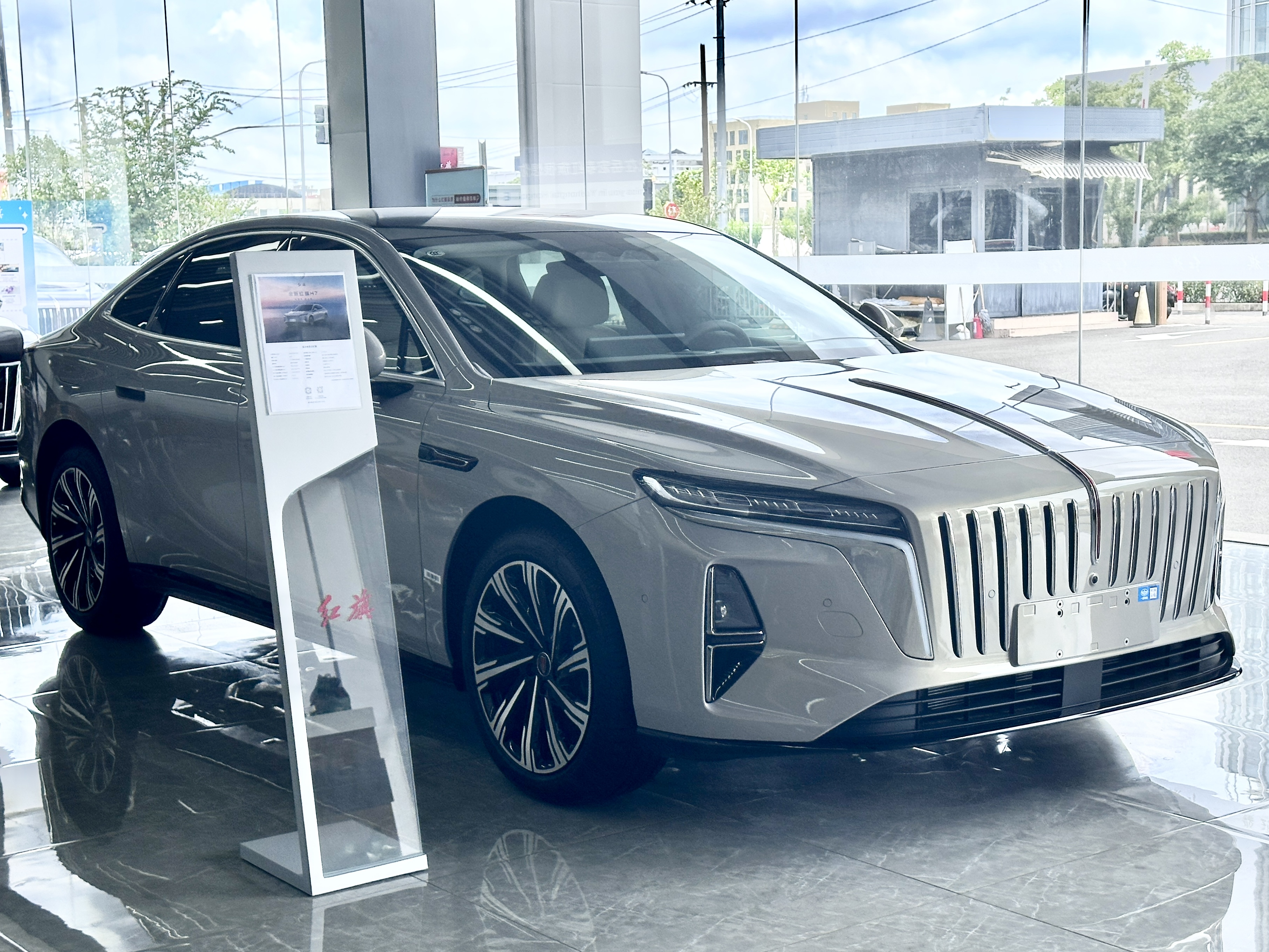
Hongqi H7

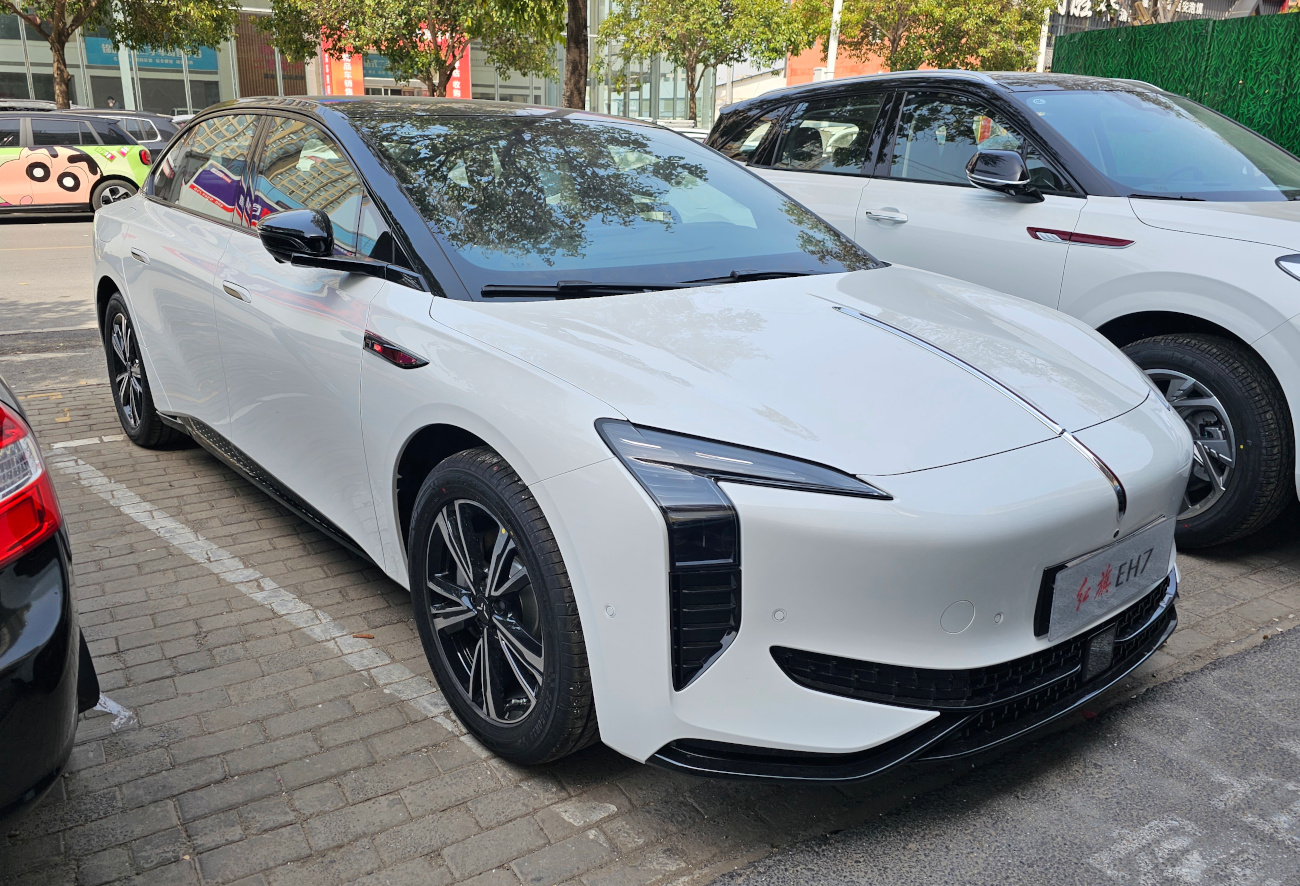
Hongqi EH7

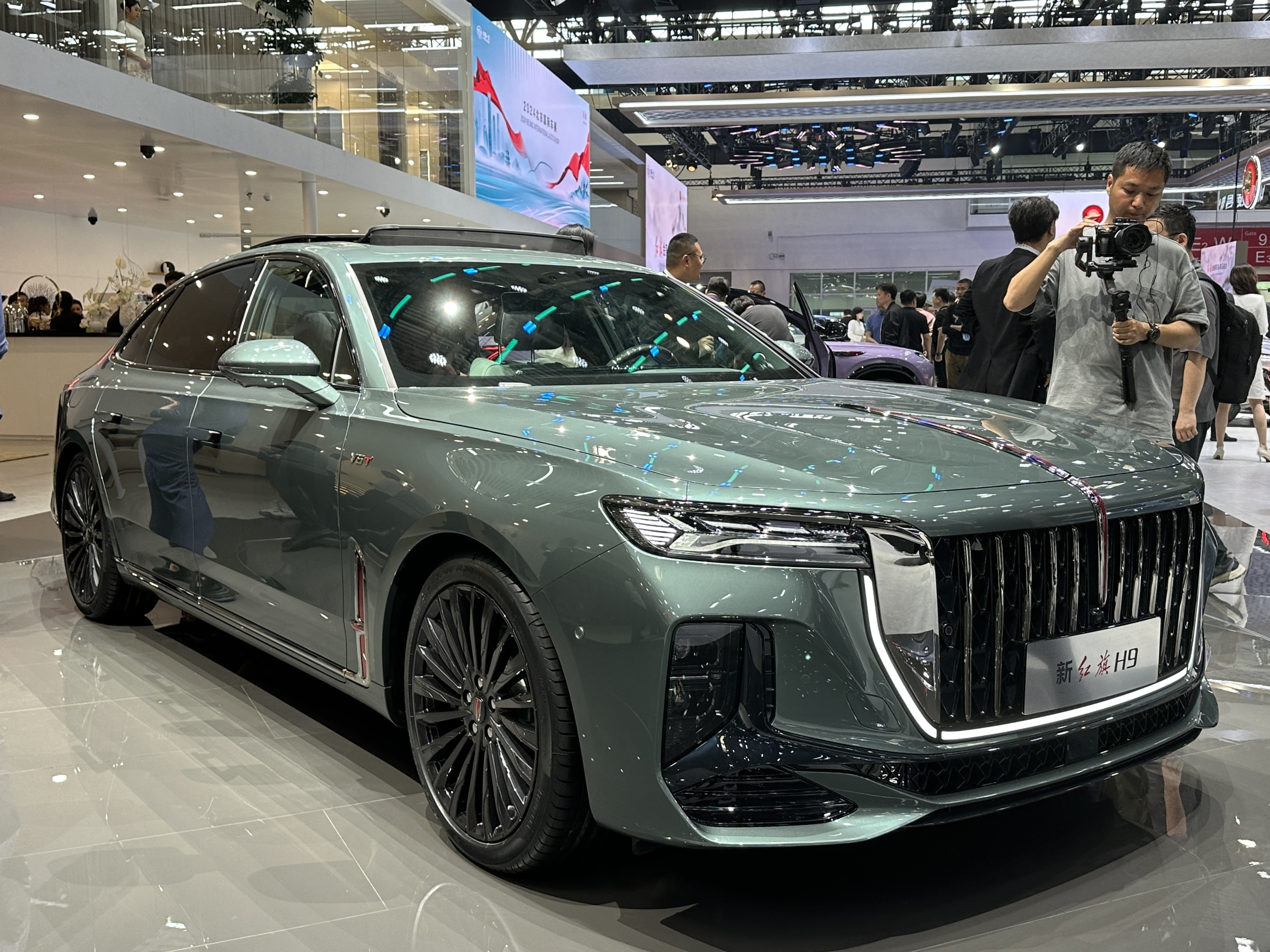
Hongqi H9

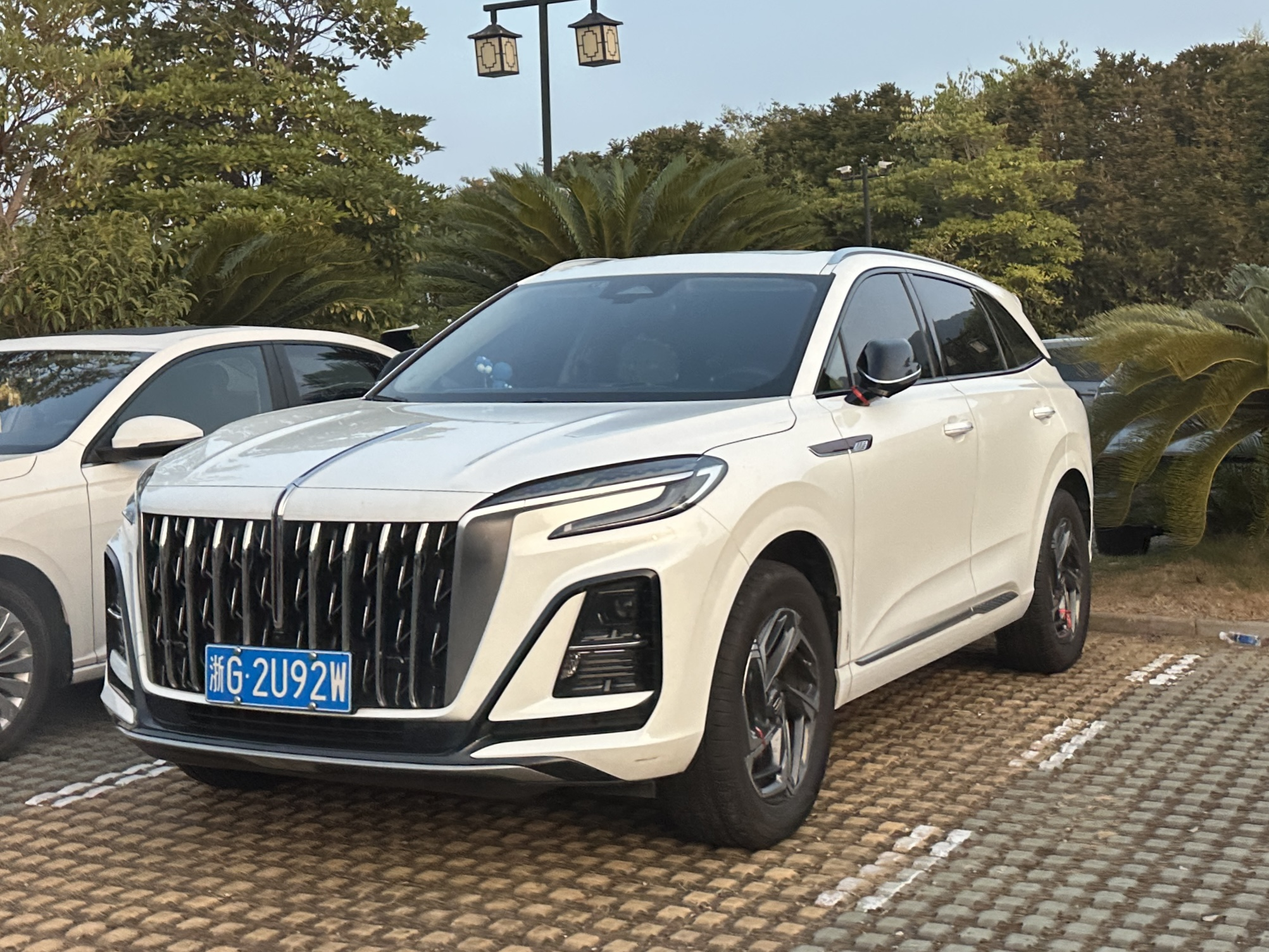
Hongqi HS3

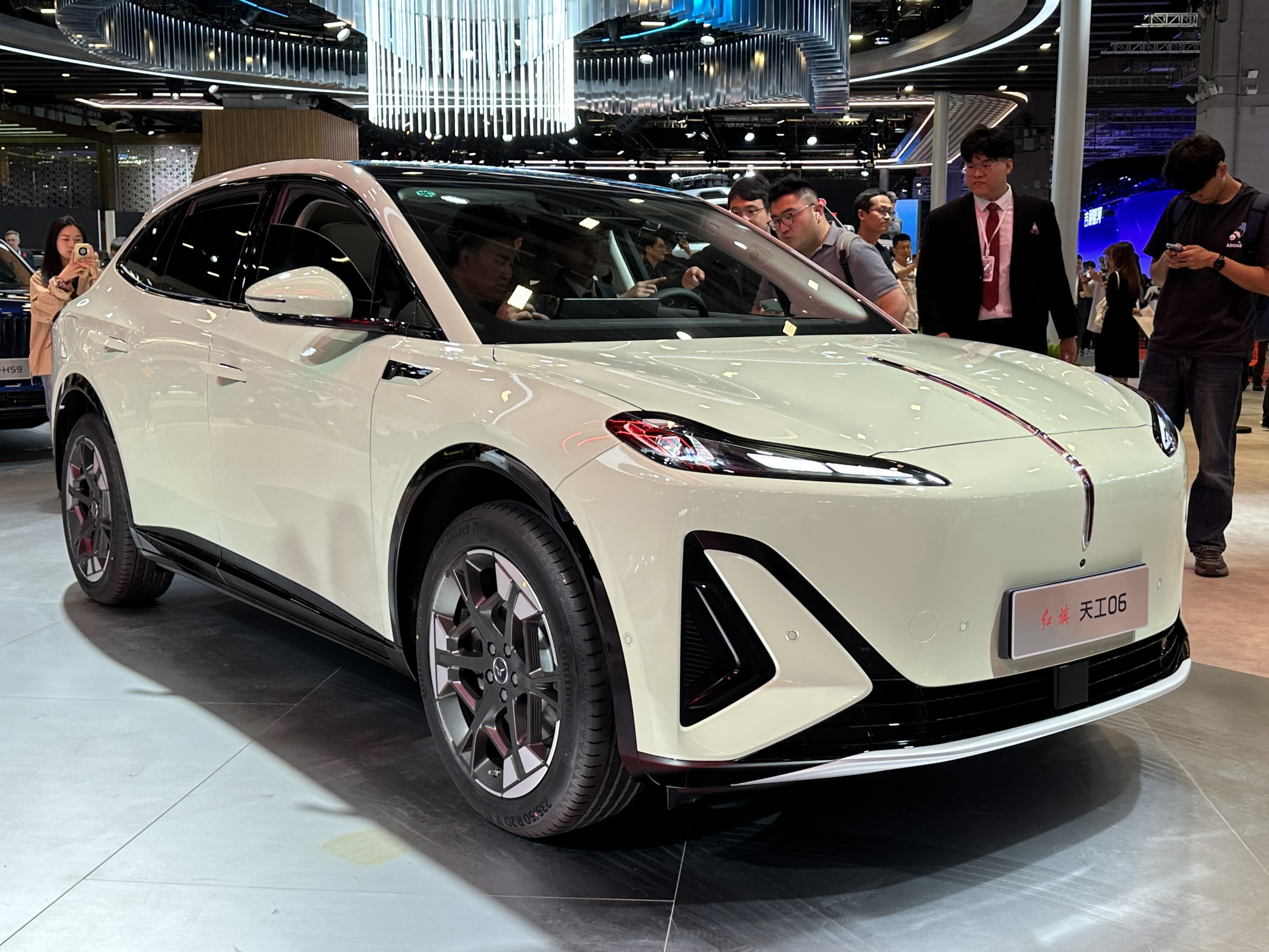
Hongqi Tiangong 06

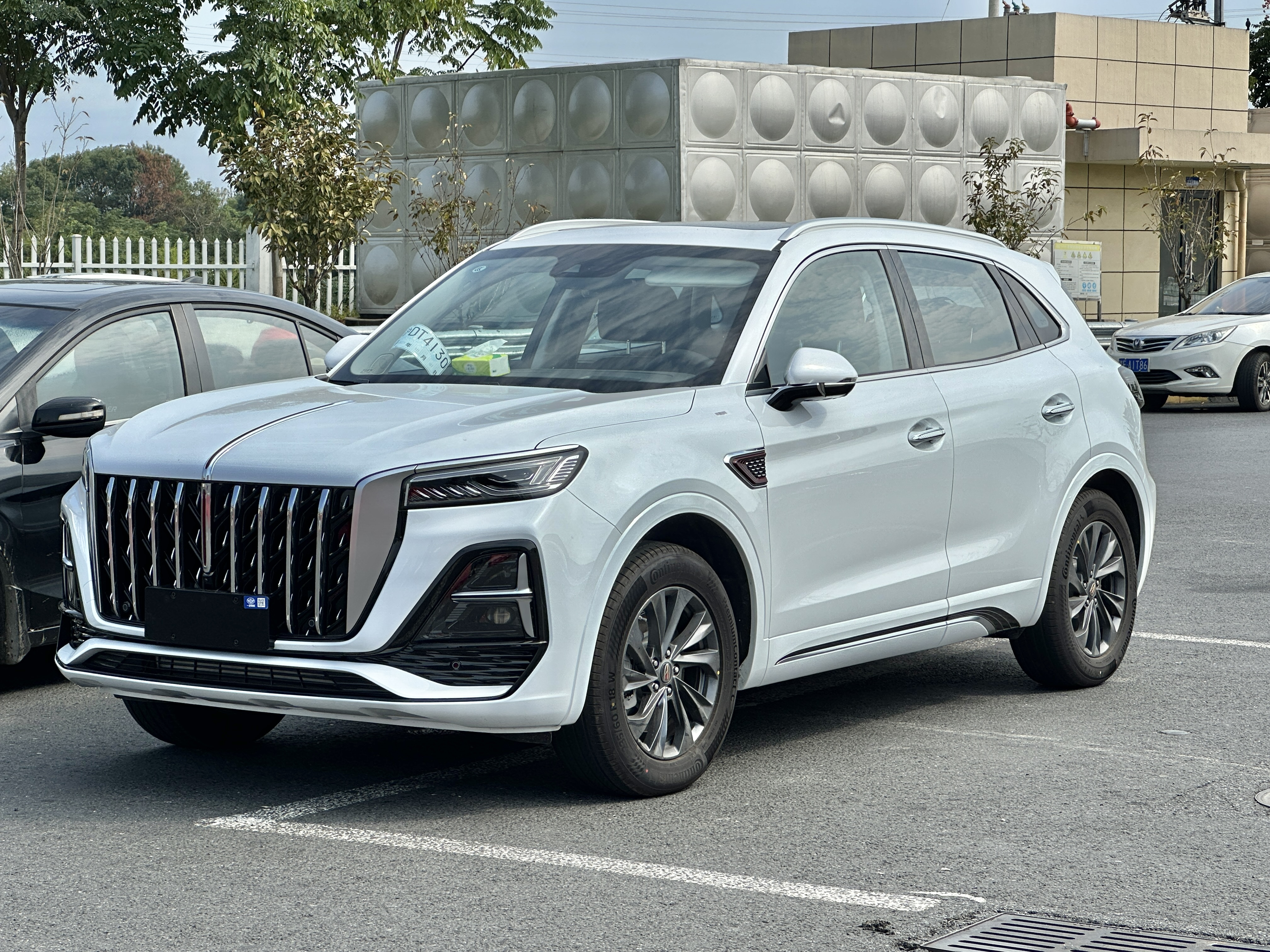
Hongqi HS5

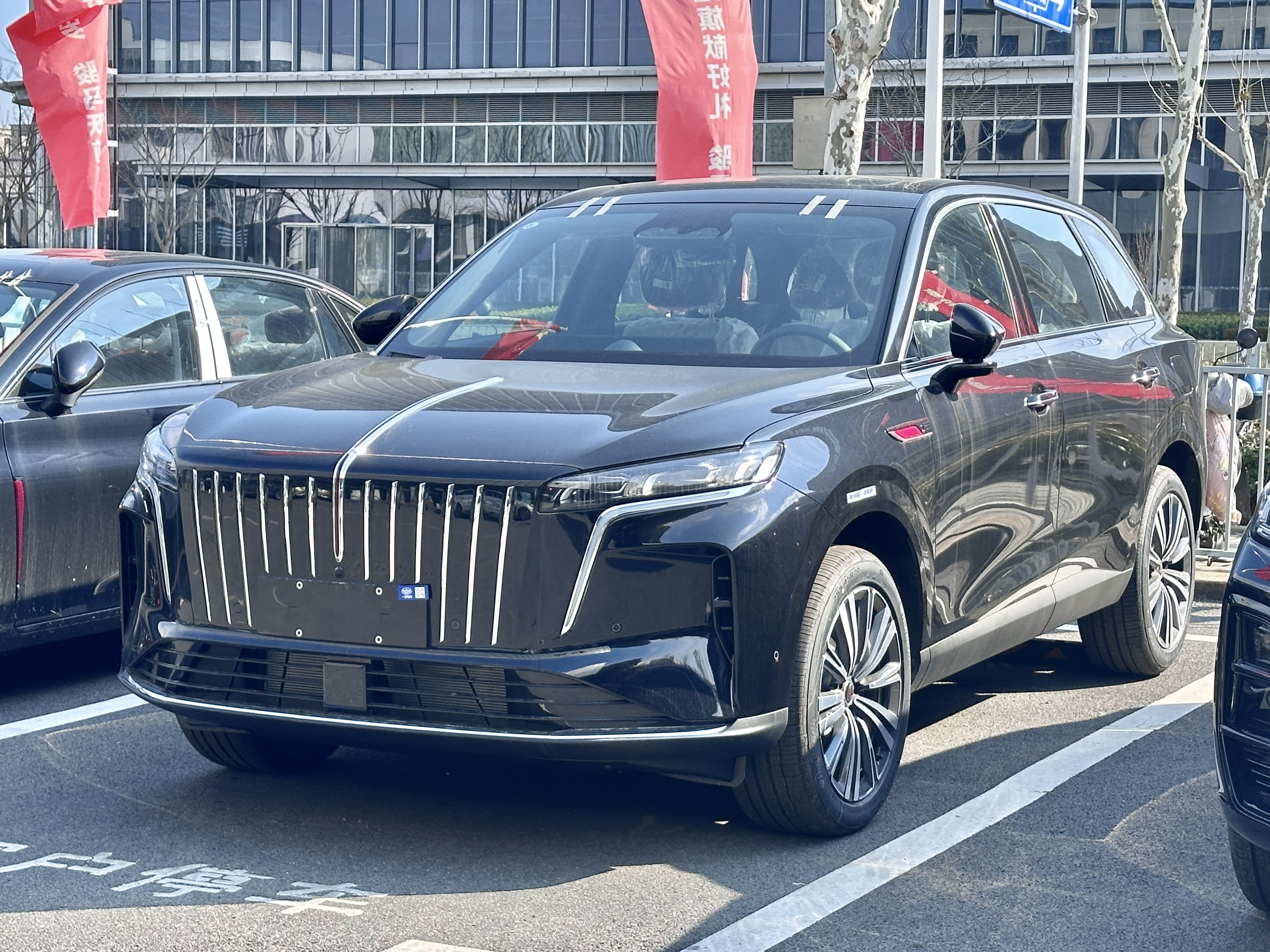
Hongqi HS6

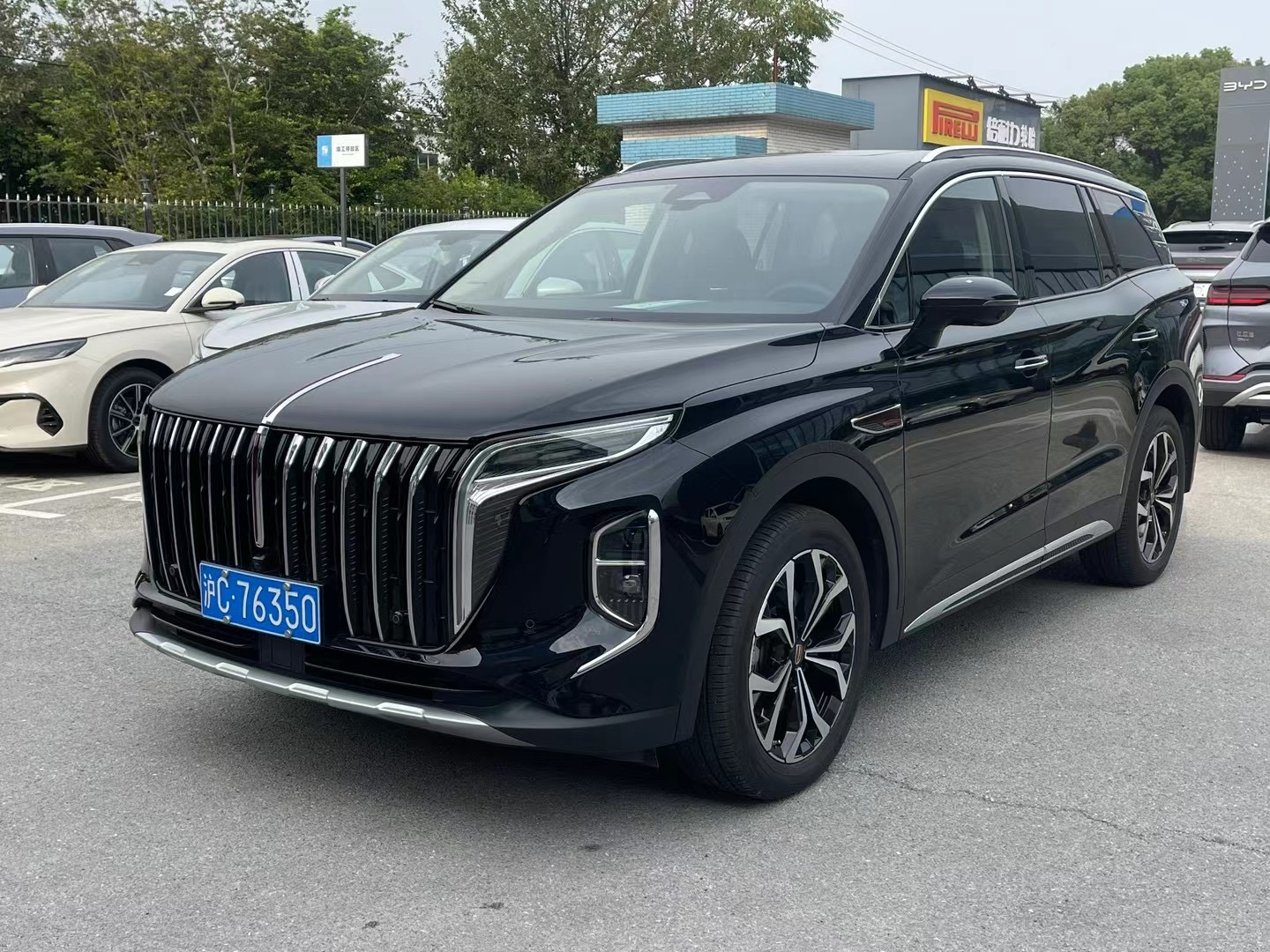
Hongqi HS7

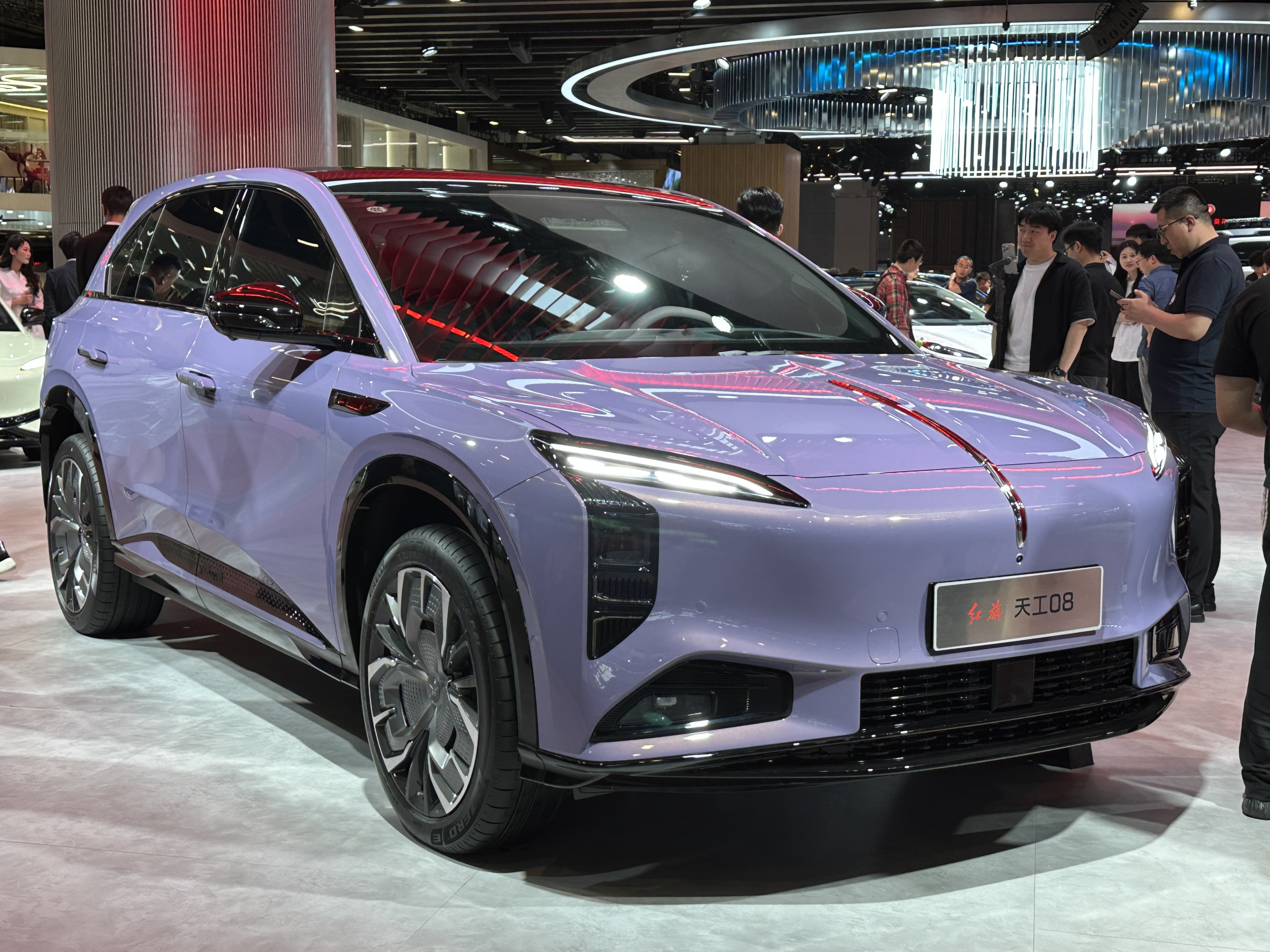
Hongqi Tiangong 08

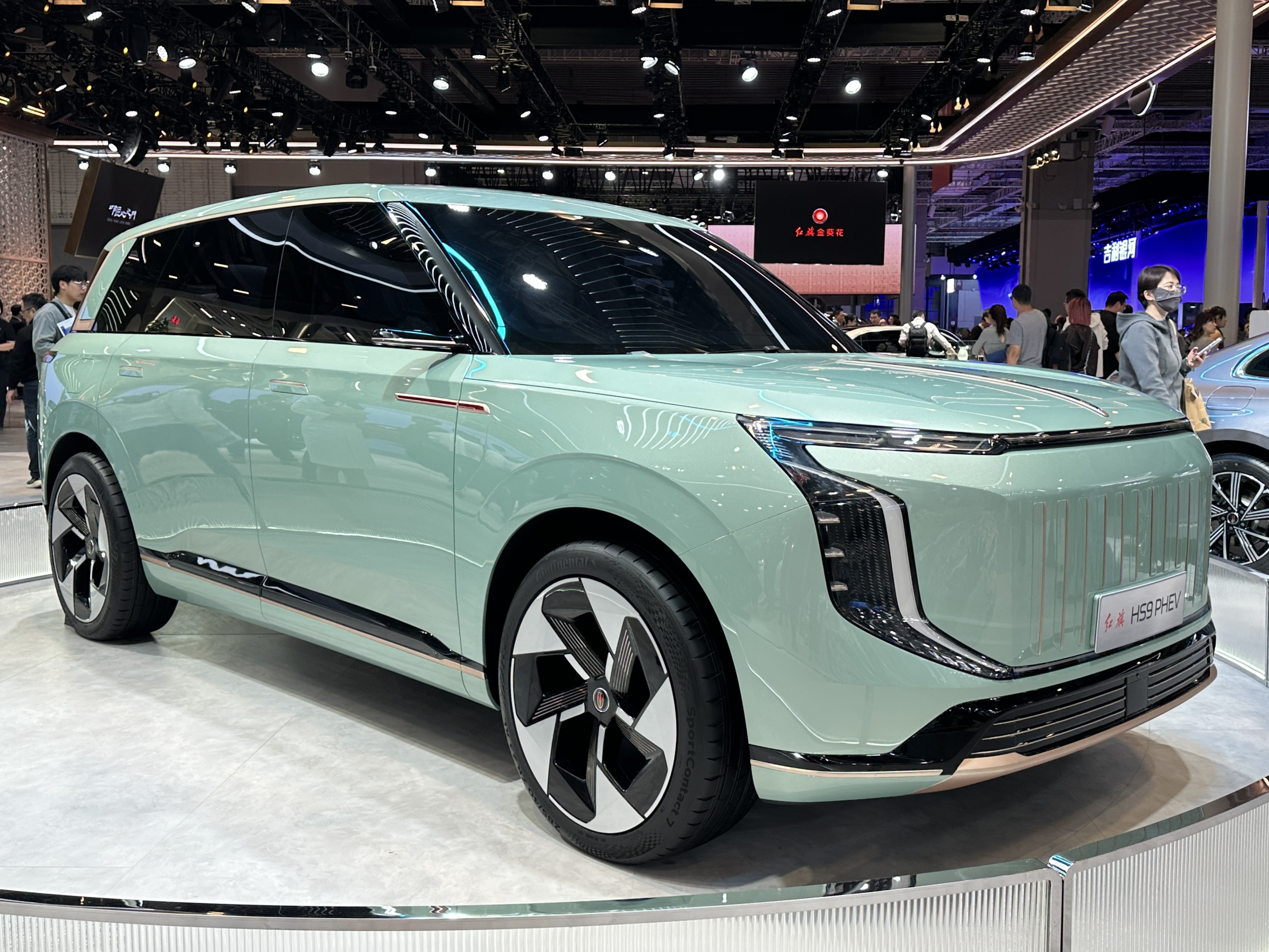
Hongqi HS9

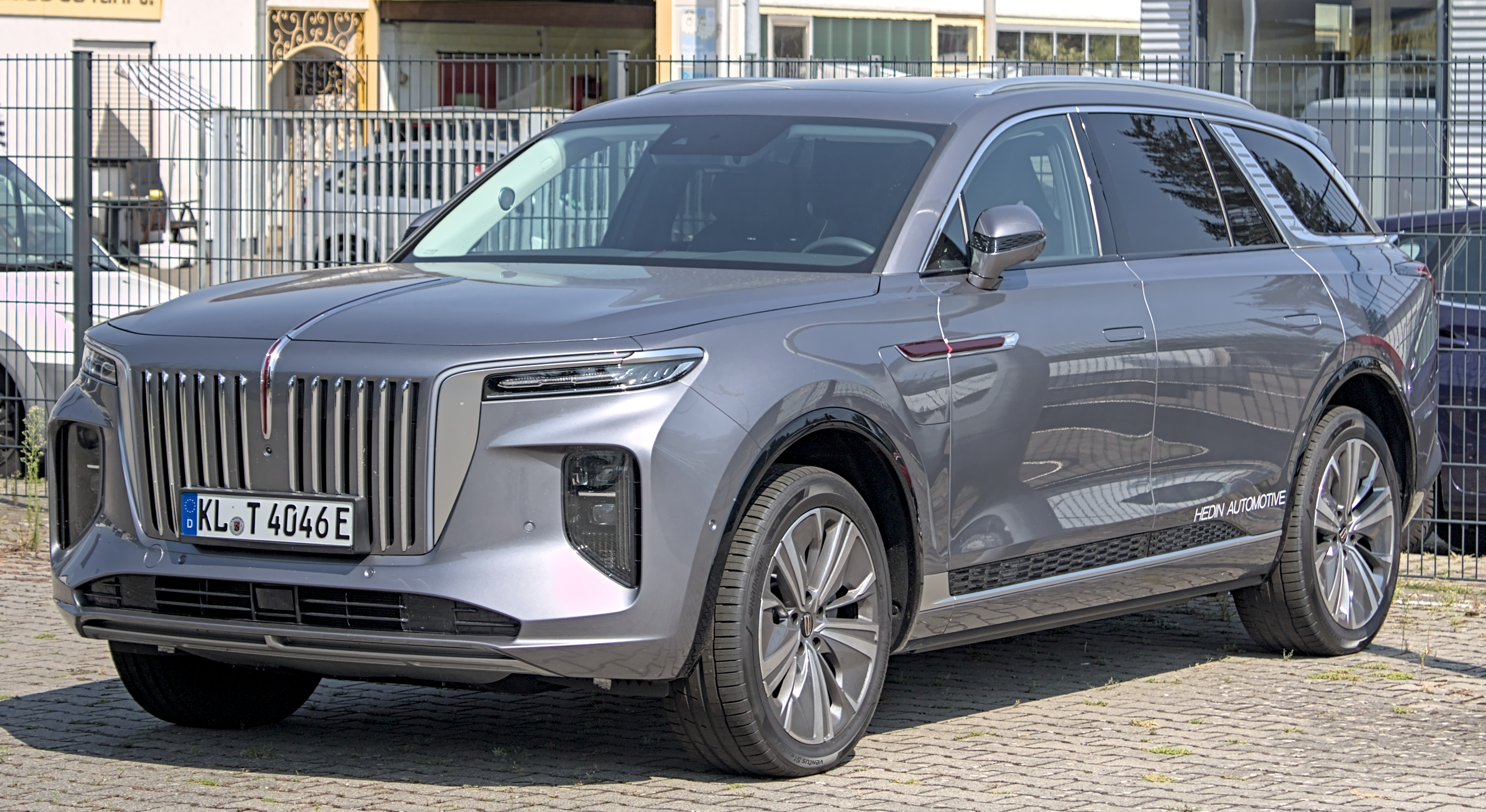
Hongqi E-HS9

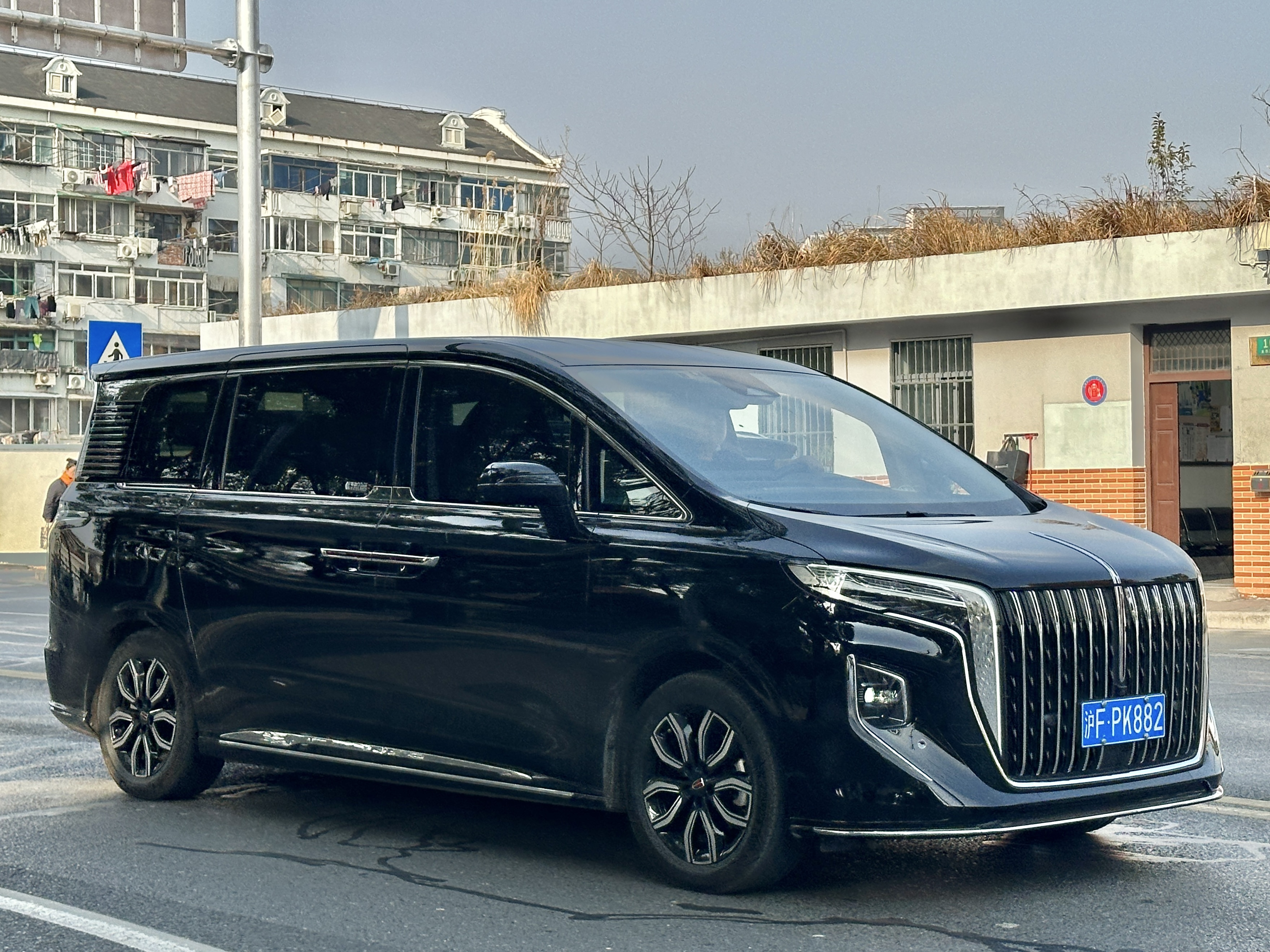
Hongqi HQ9

=== Official state cars ===
Before 2014, Chinese paramount leaders generally used vehicles supplied by the host country when visiting a foreign country. This custom began to change in November 2014, when President Xi Jinping, brought his own Hongqi L5 presidential car on a state visit to New Zealand as an official state car.

Traditionally, the Chinese paramount leaders used Hongqi as ceremonial cars in the anniversary parade of the People's Republic of China. The ceremonial cars like CA7600J, CA772TJ, CA770TJ and CA7601J are more retro-looking which inherited from CA72, the very first model of Hongqi brand which used by Chairman Mao Zedong on 10th anniversary of the People's Republic of China.

The Chinese Government uses Hongqi primarily as state guest car to host foreign head of state. The current state guest car fleet consists of Hongqi L5 and its variants L7 and L9. These vehicles are not available for sale to the public.

Model	Debuted	Length	Notes
Presidential car
Hongqi N701	2022		Debuted in visit to Hong Kong by President Xi Jinping during 25th anniversary of handover. Identifiable via lengthened rear windows. Current presidential car of China.
Hongqi N501	2016	5,500 mm.	Debuted in state visit to Rwanda by President Xi Jinping in 2018. Based on Hongqi L5 with modern styling
Hongqi L5	2014	5,555 mm	Debuted as the presidential car in state visit to New Zealand by President Xi Jinping in 2014 Developed from CA7600J.
Ceremonial car
Hongqi CA7601J	2019		Debuted in 70th anniversary of the People's Republic of China military parade in 2019 and also used for 2025 China Victory Day Parade by President Xi Jinping in 2025.
Hongqi CA7600J	2009	6,400 mm	Debuted in 60th anniversary of the People's Republic of China military parade by President Hu Jintao in 2009 Also used in 2015 China Victory Day Parade by President Xi Jinping.
Hongqi CA772TJ	1999	5,980 mm	Debuted in 50th anniversary of the People's Republic of China military parade by President Jiang Zemin in 1999
Hongqi CA770TJ	1984	5,980 mm	Debuted in 35th anniversary of the People's Republic of China military parade by paramount leader Deng Xiaoping in 1984
Hongqi CA72	1959	5,500 mm	Debuted in 10th anniversary of the People's Republic of China military parade by Chairman Mao Zedong in 1959
State guest car
Hongqi L9	2013	6,400 mm, wheelbase 3900mm	Developed from CA7600J.
Hongqi L7	2012	6,097 mm, wheelbase 3,600 mm.	Developed from CA7600J.
Hongqi L5	2012	5,555 mm, wheelbase 3,435 mm.	Used for foreign dignitaries. First used to ferry French President François Hollande in 2013. The official state version equipped with 6.0 litre engine and not sold to public Developed from CA7600J.

== Former models ==
=== Pre-2010s ===
Production dates	Model designation	Picture	Note
1958	Dongfeng CA71(东风 East Wind)		GAZ-21 body and chassis, Mercedes-Benz 190 engine
1958–1965	CA72		1955 Imperial C-69 sedan
1966–1981	CA770 series		1960s Imperial
1972–1979	CA774		Five prototypes were built with the intent of replacing the Hongqi CA770. No series production.
1980–1987	CA630		A bus designed as VIP transport for the government, state-owned high-end hotels and travelling agencies. 19 seater load capacity, fitted with a 4.5 litre V8 engine producing 165 horsepower paired to a 4 speed manual gearbox.
1982–1984	CA750 CA760		A sedan made by Hongqi with Datsun 280C styling cues. Was produced to compete with the Shanghai SH760. A long wheelbase version was also available as the CA760 with only one made.
1987	CA750F CA760		Dodge 600, did not enter production
1989	CA7225LH		Audi 100
1992–1995	CA7560; CA7560LH (LWB)		Few examples built, modernized 770.
1993–1996	CA7221L		Audi 100
1993–1998	CA1021U3 pickup		Audi 100
1995–1997	CA7465C8		Lincoln Town Car
1996–2004	CA7200 CA7220		Audi 100
1996–2005	CA5020XJB CA7228L CA7226L		Audi 100
1997	CA7220EL1		Audi 100
1997	CA7220L1		Audi 100
1998	CA7240L		Audi 100
1998	CA7200E3L CA7247L		Audi 100
1998–2005	CA7460 CA7460L1 CA7460L2 CA7460L3 (Flagship 旗舰)		Lincoln Town Car
1998	CA7220A9EL1 CA7220A9EL2 CA7220A9EL2A2		Audi 100
1999	CA7220A9E		Audi 100
2000–2006	CA7202E3 CA7242E6 CA7182E7 (Century Star 世纪星)		Audi 100
2000–2005	CA7203E3L (Century Star 世纪星)		Audi 100
2001–2003	CA7180A2E CA7180A3E (Mingshi 明仕)		Audi 100
2001–2003	CA7180A2EL1 (Mingshi 明仕)		Audi 100
2001-2005	CA7202E3L1 CA7202E6L1 (Century Star 世纪星)		Audi 100
2001–2005	CA7202A9EL3 CA7202A9EL2 (Century Star 世纪星)		Audi 100
2002–2005	CA7202E6L (Century Star 世纪星)		Audi 100
2004	CA7400 (Flagship 旗舰)		Remake of the Hongqi CA770 with a lowered roofline based on the 1998–2011 Lincoln Town Car. Prototype only
2006–2010	HQ3 Shengshi HQ430 (盛世 Days of Prosperity)		Toyota Crown Majesta
2009	HQE		
2009	CA7600J		

=== Concept cars ===
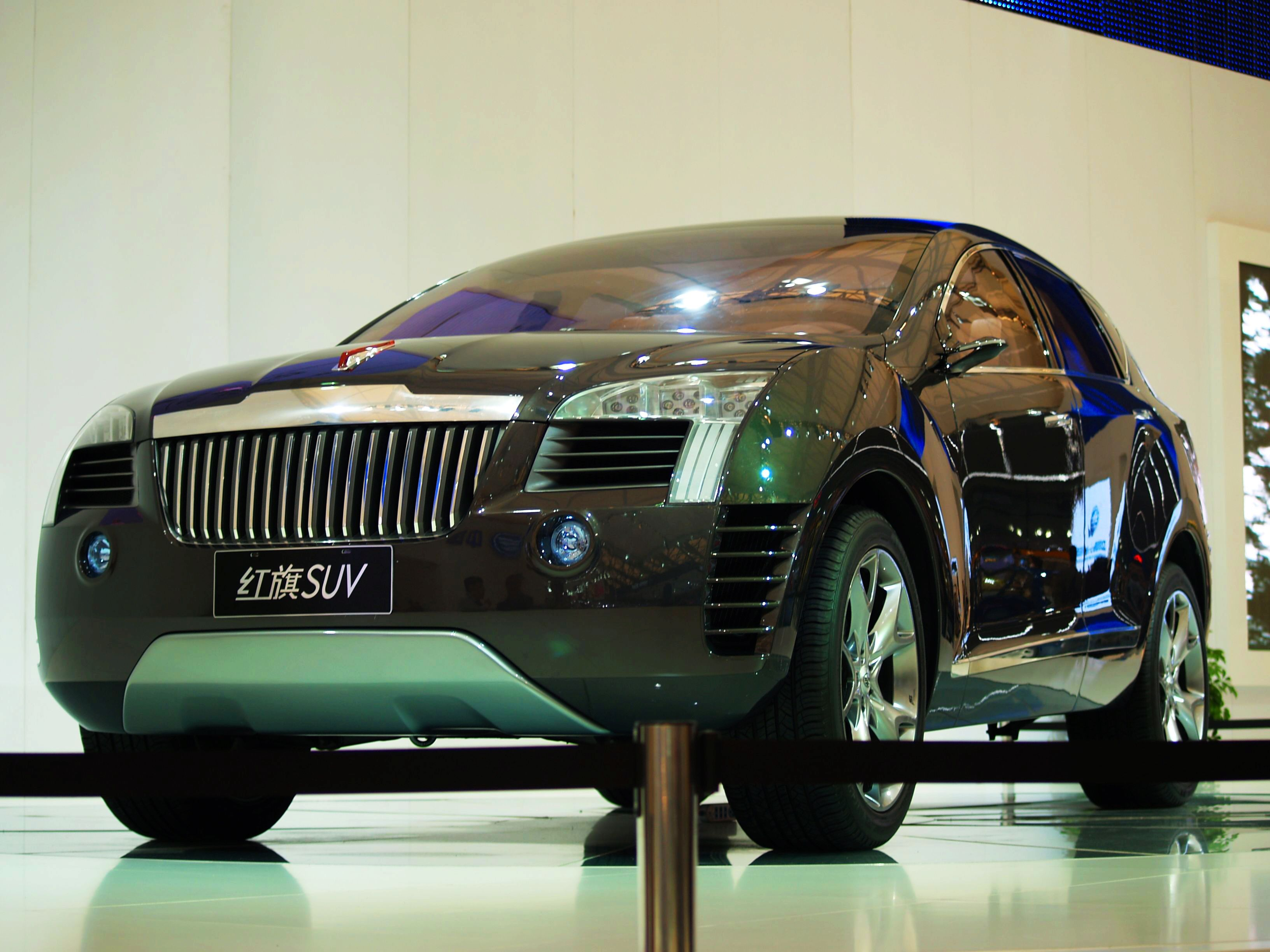
A 2007 Hongqi SUV concept car

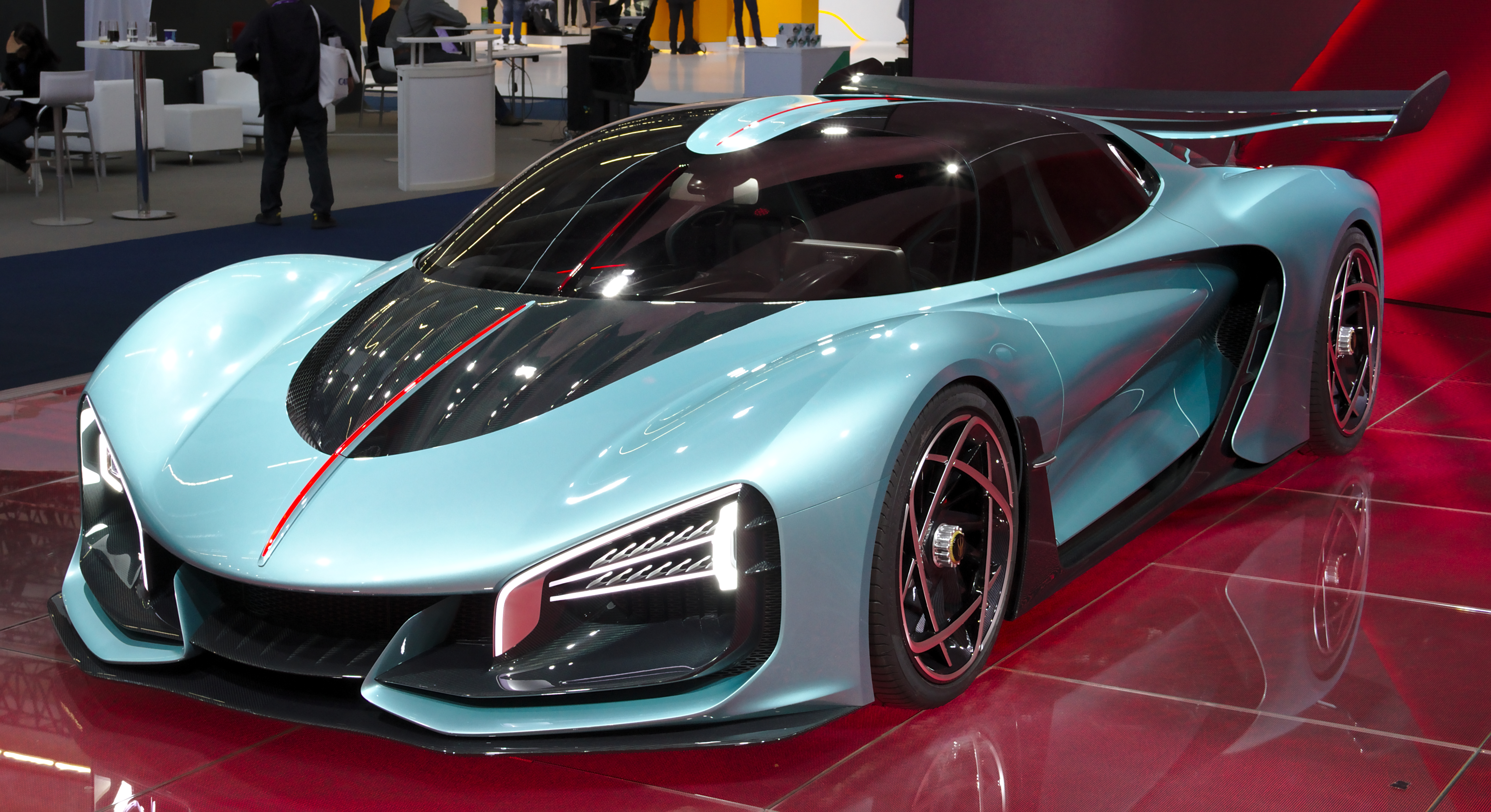
Hongqi S9 concept car (2019)

Hongqi will sometimes make an appearance at autoshows held on Chinese soil, showing off a concept car that attracts attention.

At the 2005 Shanghai International Auto Exhibition, a Hongqi HQD concept car was displayed.

A Hongqi SUV concept was unveiled at the 2007 Beijing International Automotive Exhibition.

At the 2015 Shanghai International Auto Exhibition, Hongqi displayed a concept SUV radically different from its 2007 entry.

At the 2018 Beijing International Auto Exhibition, Hongqi unveiled the electric sports car E-Jing GT Concept.

At the 2019 Frankfurt Motor Show, Hongqi unveiled the sports car S9 and the SUV E115.

At the 2021 Shanghai International Auto Exhibition, Hongqi unveiled the luxury limousine L-Concept.

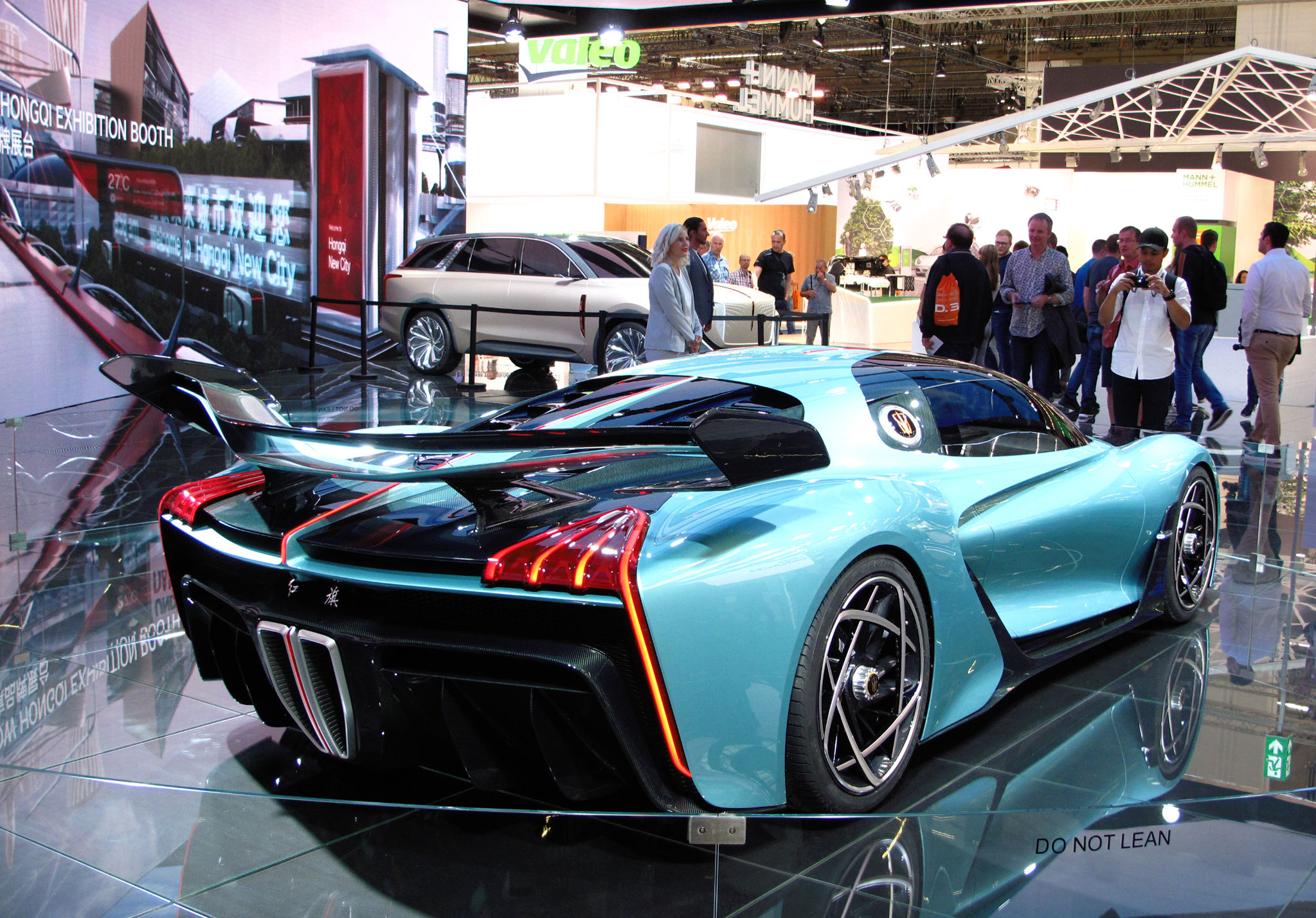
Hongqi S9

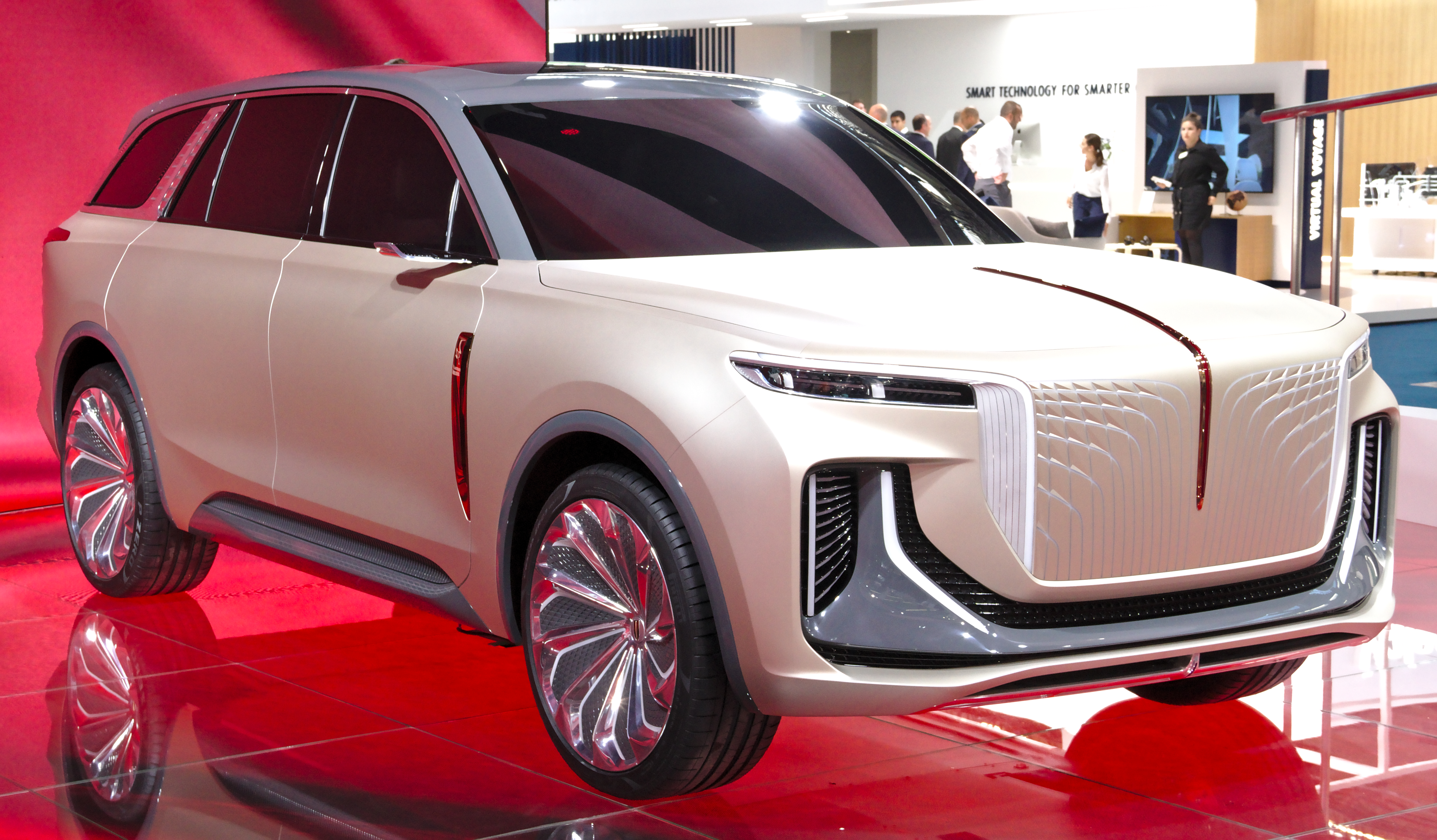
Hongqi E115

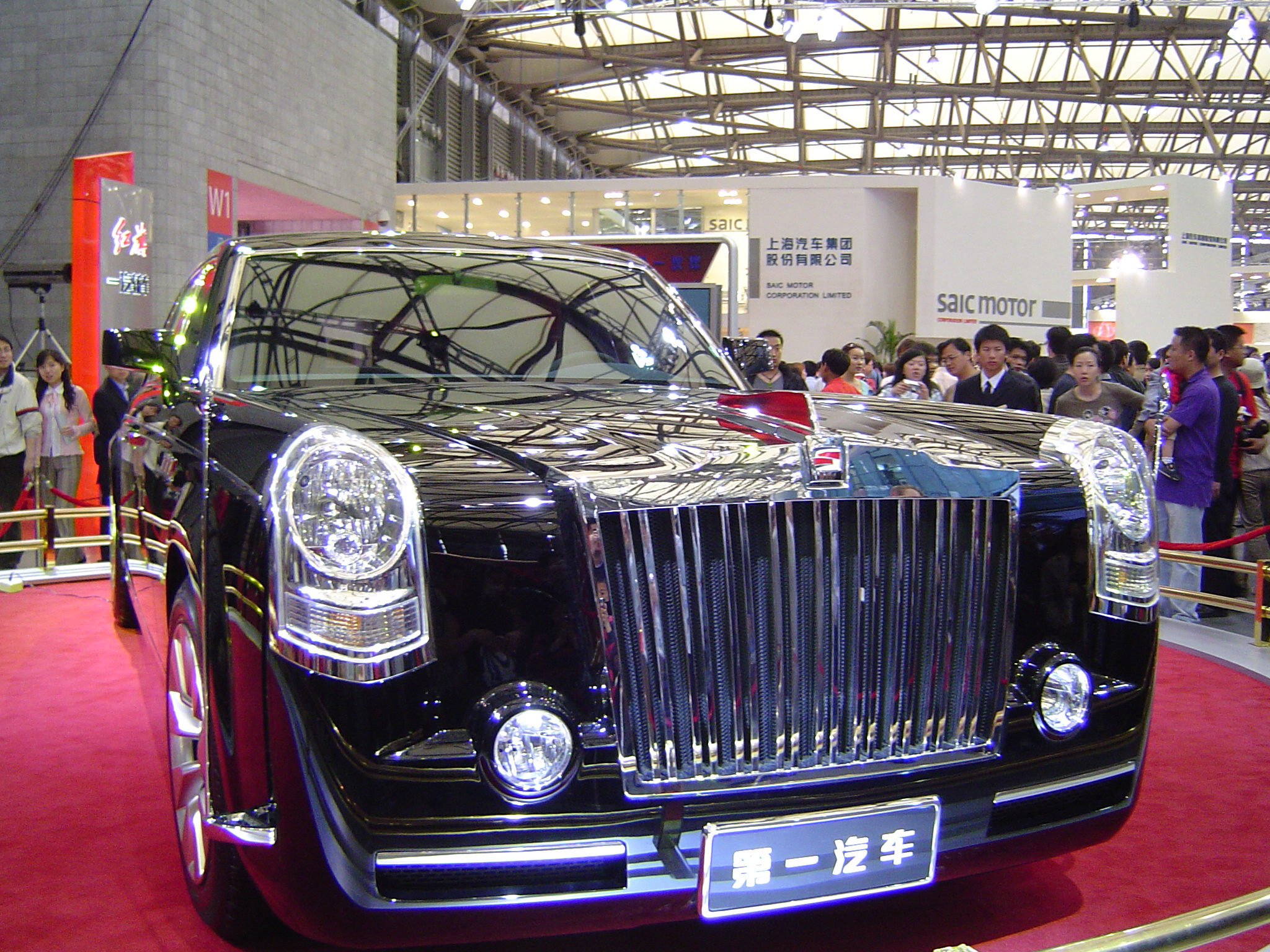
Hongqi HQD concept car

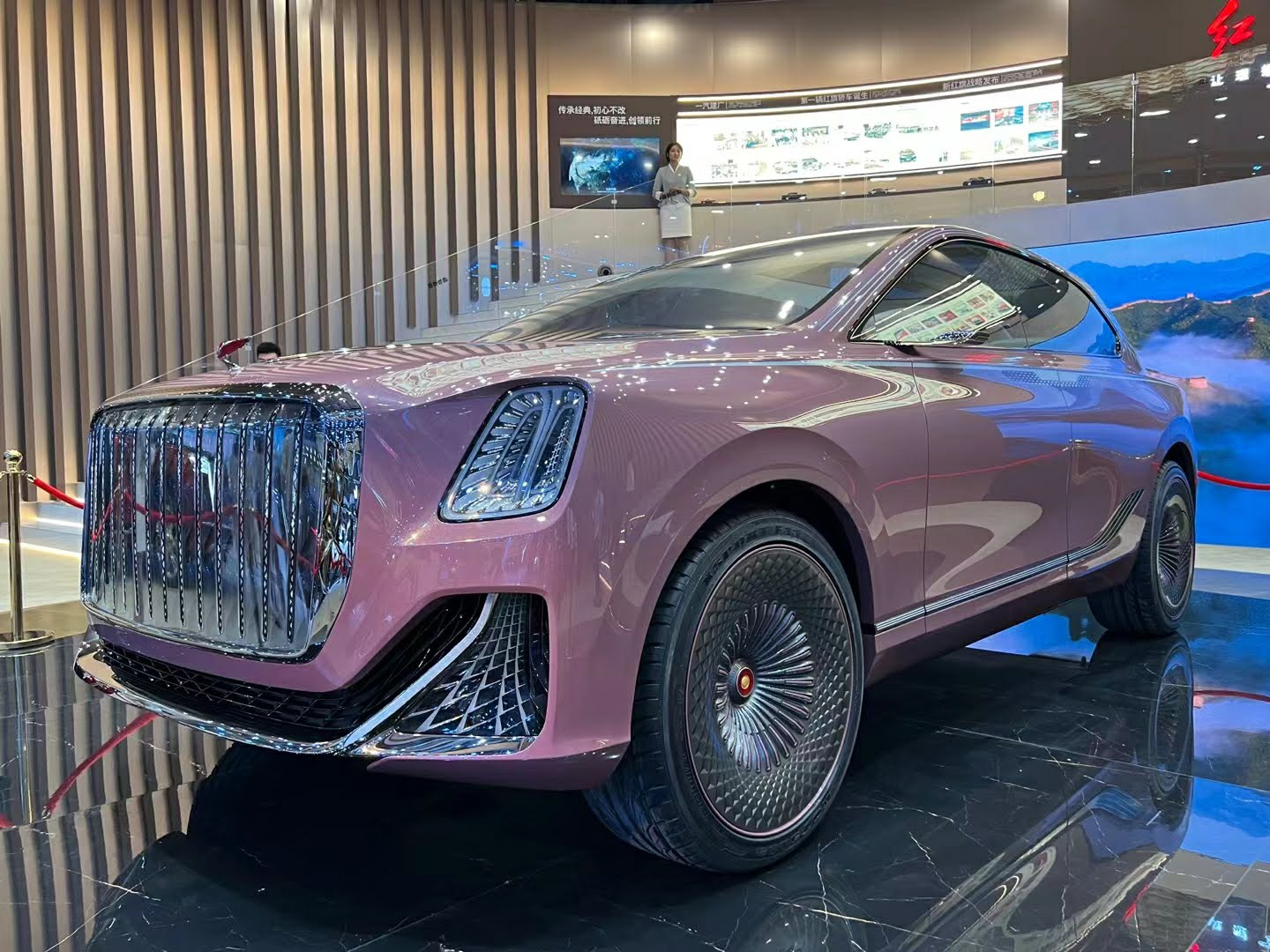
Hongqi E-LS

=== HQE ===
Not strictly a concept car, the V12-powered Hongqi HQE was used by high-ranking official Hu Jintao during parades celebrating the 60th anniversary of the People's Republic of China. It appeared on an official list of upcoming models in 2010 with a retail price of 1.2 million US dollars (which would have made it the most expensive Chinese-built car in history). This model has since been shown at the 2010 Beijing Auto Show as the CA7600L. It is equipped with a 300 kW (408 PS; 402 hp) 6.0 L V12 engine developed in-house.

=== S9 ===
Similarly to the HQE, The Hongqi S9, is not strictly a concept car, it is set to start production in Italy with Silk-FAW, a joint venture between the FAW group and American based design firm Silk EV. the S9 is luxury sports car powered by a combustion 4.0 L twin-turbo V8 engine associated with a hybrid system, providing it with an output of 1,381 hp. The production version of the S9 was introduced in 2021 Auto Shanghai.

=== Extreme off-roader ===
Five door SUV, quad-motor 1300 hp PHEV, triple differential lock, 85 litre fuel tank, 65kWh battery, 7 kW V2L, lidar.

== Relationship with Bestune ==
Hongqi and another FAW Group brand, Bestune, have exhibited some overlap. In 2007, due to flagging sales, Hongqi showrooms were merged with those of the new Bestune brand. It was thought that giving the Hongqi brand more sales outlets would increase turnover. At the 2010 Beijing Auto Show, Bestune models were shown "under the Hongqi naming series," and until 2011 the two brands both used the Hongqi "circled one" badging.

== Sales ==
=== China ===
A total of 2,534 Hongqi vehicles were sold in China in 2013, making it the 67th largest-selling car brand in the country in that year (and the 41st largest-selling Chinese brand). Hongqi sold 2,774 cars in 2014 and became the 72nd largest car brand in China.

In January 2022, the 2022 China FAW and Hongqi Brand News Annual Conference was held. Data showed that the company's Hongqi brand sales exceeded 300,000 units in 2021, a year-on-year increase of 50.1%, ranking first among the second camp of luxury car brands in the Chinese market. Its growth rate ranks first among luxury car brands.

On January 1, 2024, the retail sales of the Hongqi brand in 2023 exceeded 370,000 units, a year-on-year increase of 29.5%, with positive growth for 6 consecutive years, and its market share ranked first among Chinese brands in the China ICE vehicle market with more than 150,000 yuan.

=== Overseas ===
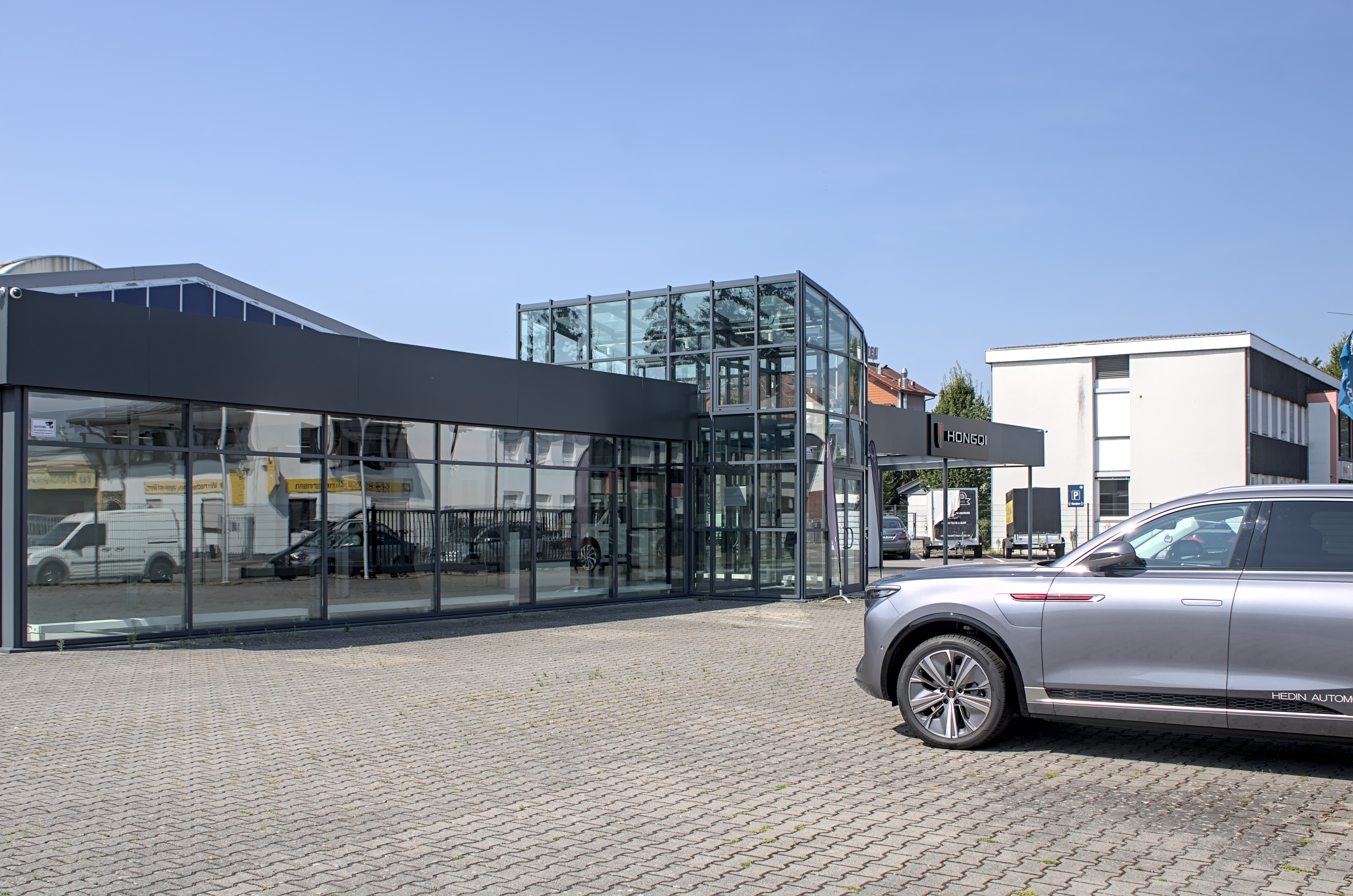
Hongqi showroom in Schwetzingen

Hongqi has had a presence in Dubai since December 2018, with 20 vehicles of the H5 and H7 models sold for use in the 2019 NEXT summit.

On December 30, 2020, Hongqi exported 400 H9 and H5 sedans, HS7 and HS5 SUVs to Jeddah in Saudi Arabia.

In September 2021, Hongqi has launched in Norway.

On February 1, 2022, Hongqi launched in Vietnam with the E-HS9 and H9 being the first vehicle to be sold. Hongqi has a presence in Israel as of April 6, 2022 with the launch of the Hongqi E-HS9 under the Samelet Group.

In December 2022, Hongqi launched in Denmark with the E-HS9.

In January 2023, Hongqi launched in Sweden with the E-HS9. Due to poor sales, the model received a significant price cut (300,000 SEK or appx 30,000 USD) half a year later.

On 12 August 2026, Hongqi launched in Indonesia with the E-HS9.

== In popular culture ==
A 1978 Hongqi CA770 was featured in a 2017 episode of Jay Leno's Garage.

The Hongqi L5 was reviewed by Jeremy Clarkson in a 2019 film for The Grand Tour taking place in China. Armed with Western luxury cars, Clarkson and the other presenters sought to prove that Anglo luxury cars are inferior through a series of performance challenges.

Honqgi E-HS9 was widely reviewed by European and American motor publications, for example AutoWeek, Autocar, InsideEVs, Motor Norge, Norsk elbilforening, Bil Magasinet, SvD, DagensPS, Teknikens Värld.

== See also ==
- Automobile manufacturers and brands of China
- List of automobile manufacturers of China
