= Hongqi HS9 =

Concept plug-in hybrid full-size luxury crossover SUV

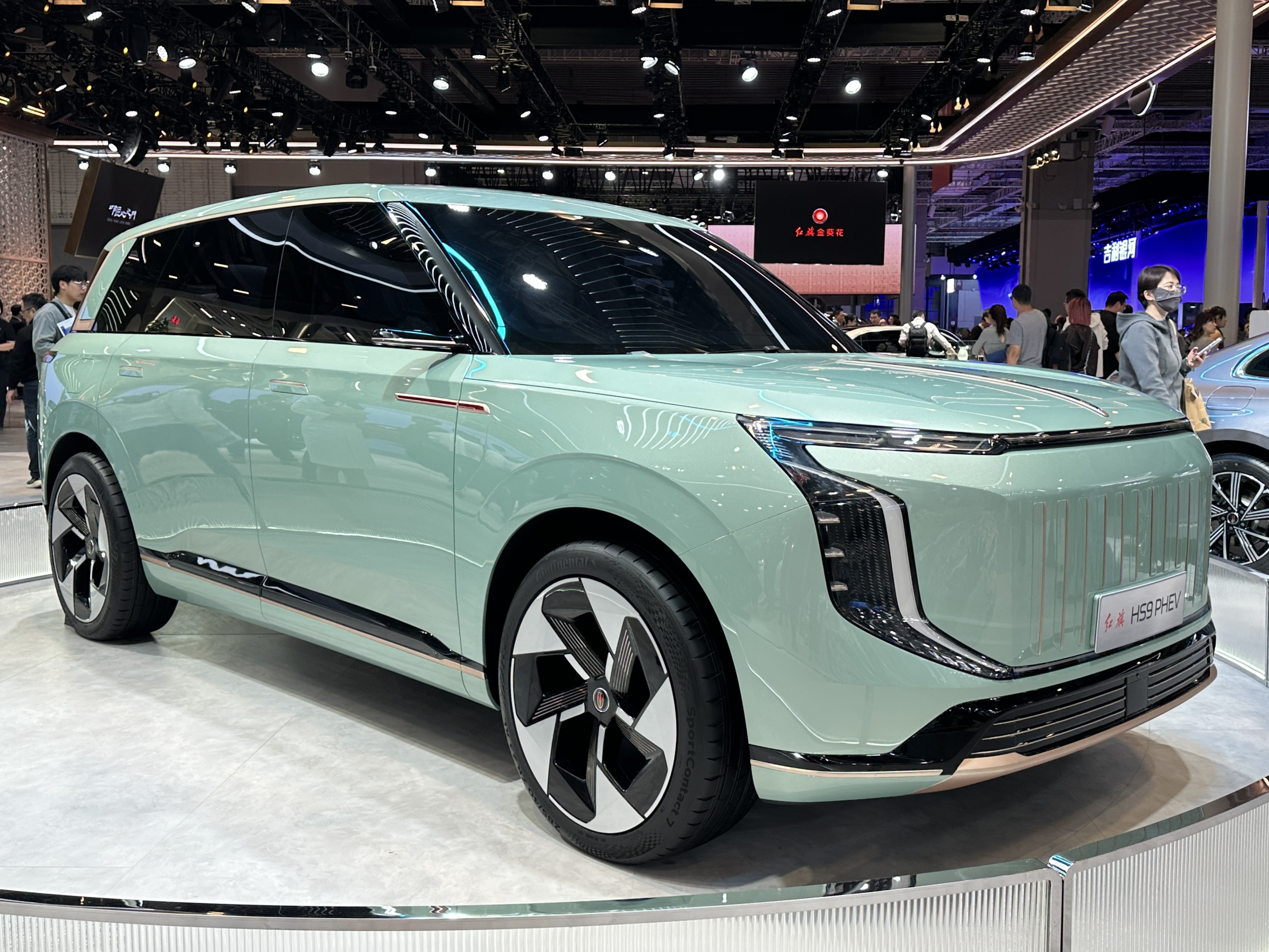

Overview
- Manufacturer: Hongqi (FAW Group)
- Model code: P701
- Production: 2025 (concept car)
- Assembly: China: Changchun

Body and chassis
- Class: Full-size luxury crossover SUV
- Body style: 5-door SUV

The Hongqi HS9 is a concept plug-in hybrid full-size luxury crossover SUV produced by Chinese automobile manufacturer Hongqi, a subsidiary of FAW Group.

== Overview ==
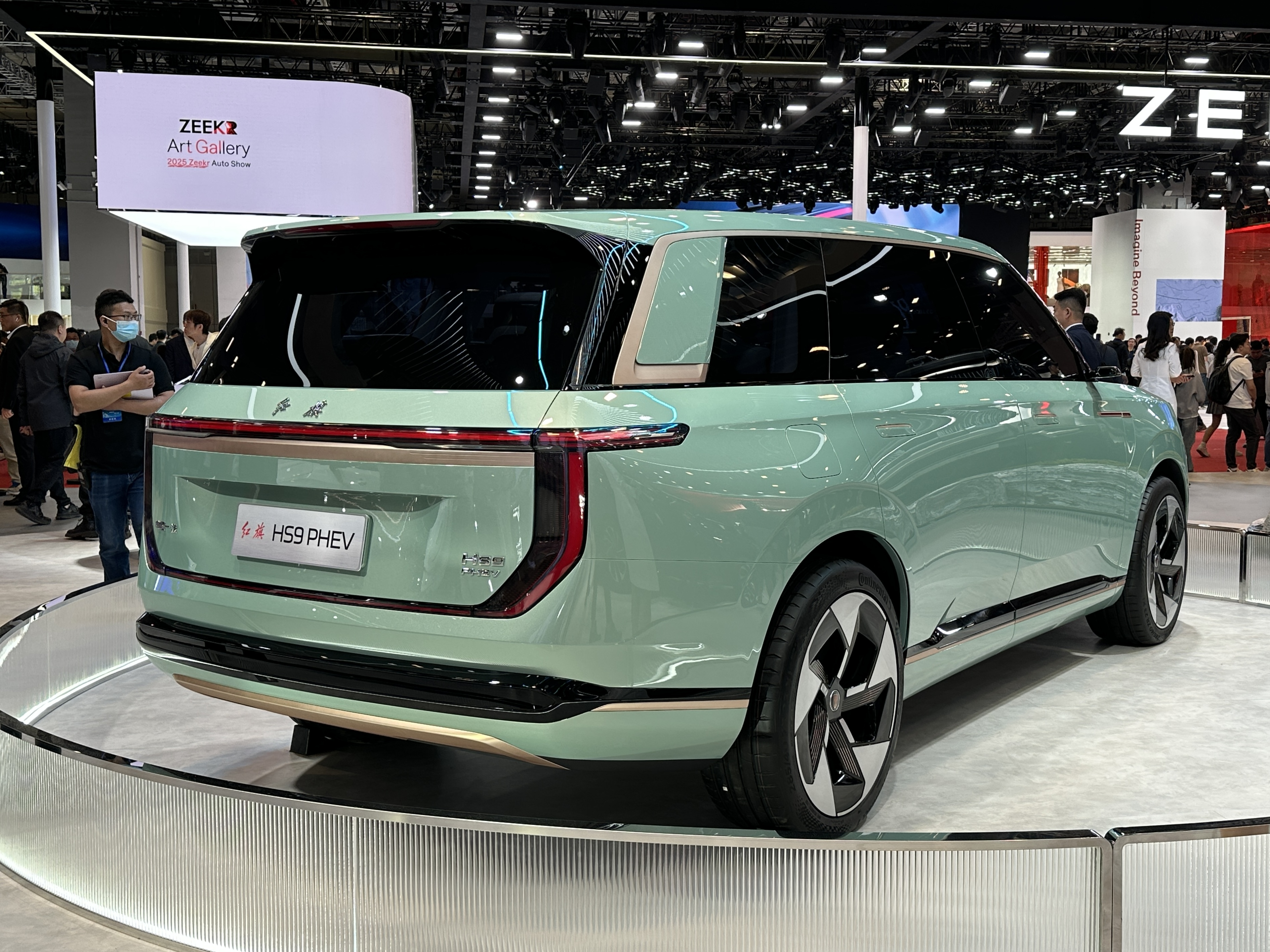
Rear view

The HS9 was unveiled in April 2025.
