= 2024 Paris Motor Show =

International auto show

2024 Paris Motor Show Mondial de l'Automobile 2024
- Genre: Auto show
- Begins: October 14, 2024
- Ends: October 20, 2024
- Location: Paris Expo Porte de Versailles, Paris
- Coordinates: 48.83064, 2.28715
- Country: France
- Previous event: 2022 Paris Motor Show
- Next event: 2026 Paris Motor Show
- Patron: Serge Gachot
- Organiser: Hopscotch Groupe; Plateforme automobile (PFA)
- Website: mondial.paris

The 2024 Paris Motor Show (in French Mondial de l'automobile de Paris or Mondial de l'Auto) took place between October 14 and 20, in the Porte de Versailles exhibition pavilion, the first day the show was open to the public on October 15, with the 14th day dedicated to the media and industry specialists.

== Exposition ==
=== Manufacturers ===
The manufacturers present at this edition:

- Alfa Romeo
- Alpine
- Audi
- Aixam
- BMW
- BYD
- Citroën
- Cadillac
- Dacia
- Devalliet
- Dangel
- Eon Motors
- ERC
- Ford
- Forthing
- GAC
- Hongqi
- Iveco
- Kia
- Kilow
- Ligier
- Leapmotor
- Moke International
- Mobilize
- Maxus
- Microlino
- Mini
- Pilotcar
- Peugeot
- PGO
- Pantore
- Renault
- Skyworth
- Soflcar
- Seres
- Škoda
- Volkswagen
- THK
- Tesla
- XPeng

=== Pop Culture ===
The Pop Culture by Movie Cars Central exhibition featured 25 iconic vehicles from movies and TV series. The models on display in Pavilion 7.1 were:

- Batmobile from Batman
- Ford Gran Torino from Starsky & Hutch
- Peugeot 406 from Taxi
- Ferrari 308 GTS from Magnum
- Ferrari Testarossa from Miami Vice
- Pontiac Firebird from Knight Rider
- Aston Martin DBS from Casino Royale
- BMW 750iL from Tomorrow Never Dies
- DMC DeLorean from Back to the Future

== Exhibition ==
=== Introductions ===
- Alfa Romeo Junior Veloce
- Alpine A290
- Alpine A110 RS
- Audi A5 III
- Audi Q5 III
- BMW X3 IV
- Cadillac Optiq
- Dacia Bigster
- Ford Capri
- Hongqi EH7
- Hongqi EHS7
- Kia EV3
- Leapmotor T03
- Leapmotor B10
- Leapmotor C10
- Renault 4 E-Tech
- Peugeot e-408
- Škoda Elroq
- Volkswagen Tayron
- XPeng G6

=== Restylings ===
- Audi RS3 phase 2
- Citroën C4 III phase 2
- Citroën C4 X phase 2

=== Concept cars ===
- Alpine A390
- Citroën C5 Aircross Concept
- Renault 17
- Renault Twingo E-Tech
- Volkswagen ID.GTI

== See also ==
- 2022 Paris Motor Show
- Tokyo Motor Show
- International Motor Show Germany
- Geneva Motor Show
