= A390 =

A390 may refer to:

- A390 road, a main road in the UK
- Lechner A-390, an Olympic sailboard class
- RFA Wave Ruler (A390), a British fleet auxiliary vessel
- Alpine A390, electric crossover SUV by French manufacturer Alpine
