= Hongqi Tiangong 08 =

Battery electric mid-size luxury crossover SUV

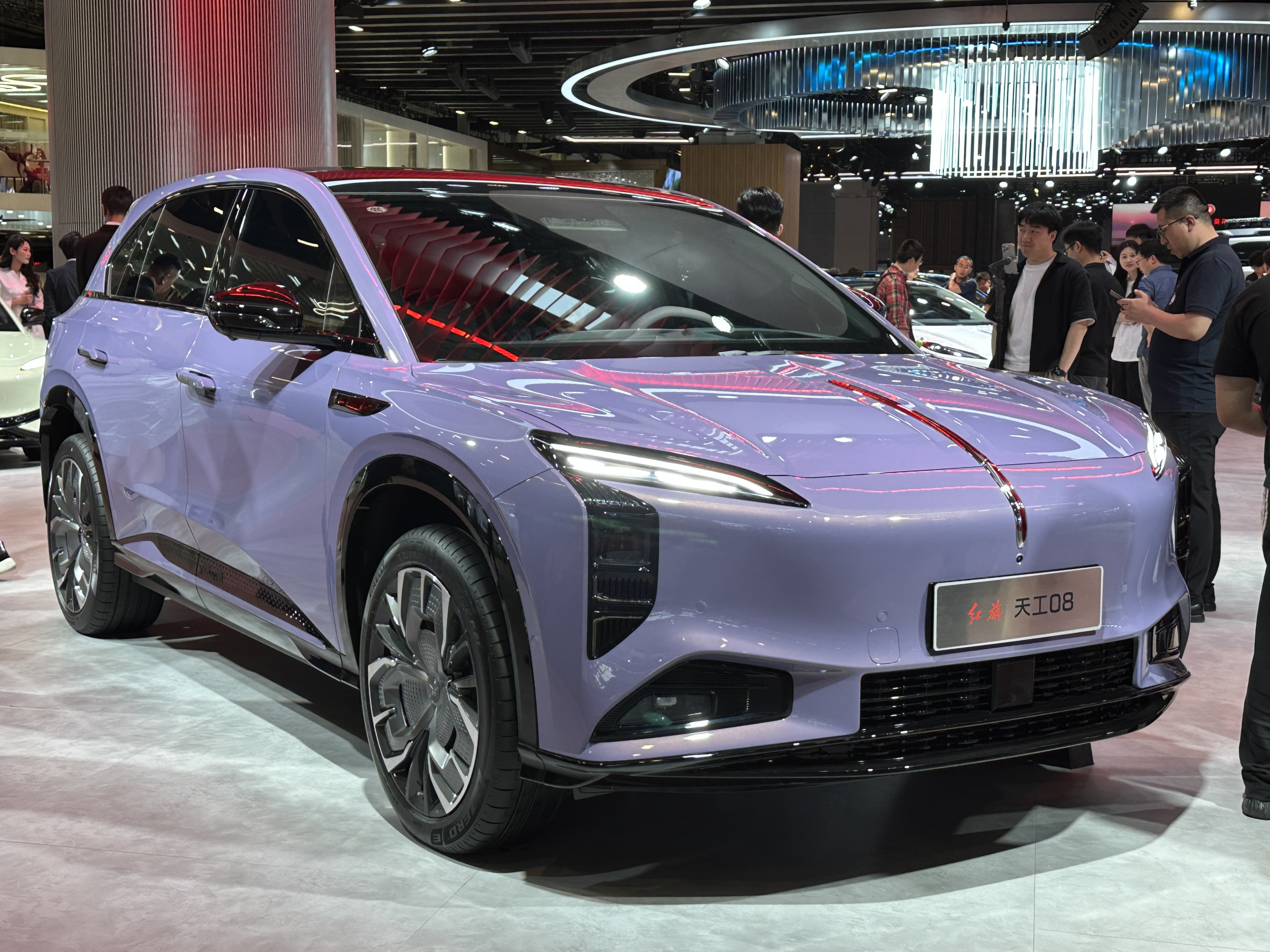

Overview
- Manufacturer: Hongqi (FAW Group)
- Also called: Hongqi EHS7 (export)
- Production: 2024–present
- Assembly: China: Changchun, Jilin

Body and chassis
- Class: Mid-size luxury crossover SUV (E)
- Body style: 5-door SUV
- Layout: Rear-motor, rear-wheel-drive; Dual-motor, all-wheel-drive
- Platform: Hongqi Tiangong Architecture
- Related: Hongqi Tiangong 05; Hongqi Tiangong 06

Powertrain
- Electric motor: Permanent magnet synchronous
- Power output: 253–455 kW (339–610 hp; 344–619 PS)
- Battery: 75 kWh LFP FinDreams; 85 kWh LFP CATL; 111 kWh Qilin NMC CATL
- Electric range: 520–730 km (323–454 mi) (CLTC)
- Plug-in charging: DC: 189 kW

Dimensions
- Wheelbase: 3,000 mm (118.1 in)
- Length: 4,925 mm (193.9 in)
- Width: 1,950 mm (76.8 in)
- Height: 1,680 mm (66.1 in)
- Curb weight: 2,320–2,770 kg (5,115–6,107 lb)

The Hongqi Tiangong 08 (Chinese: 红旗天工08) or Hongqi EHS7 is a battery electric mid-size luxury crossover SUV produced by Chinese automobile manufacturer Hongqi, a subsidiary of FAW Group.

== Overview ==
=== Hongqi E202 Concept ===
Originally was previewed as the Hongqi E202 Concept during the 2023 Auto Shanghai, the production EHS7 was first shown at the 2024 Beijing Auto Show.

=== Production model ===
On 14 October 2024, at 2024 Paris Motor Show, the EHS7 was opened pre-sales for the European market.

On 12 November 2024, the China FAW Hongqi Brand New Energy Night was held in Shenzhen, and the first model of the Hongqi Tiangong series, the Tiangong 08 was released and was officially launched in 2025 on China.

Hongqi EHS7 (near-production model)

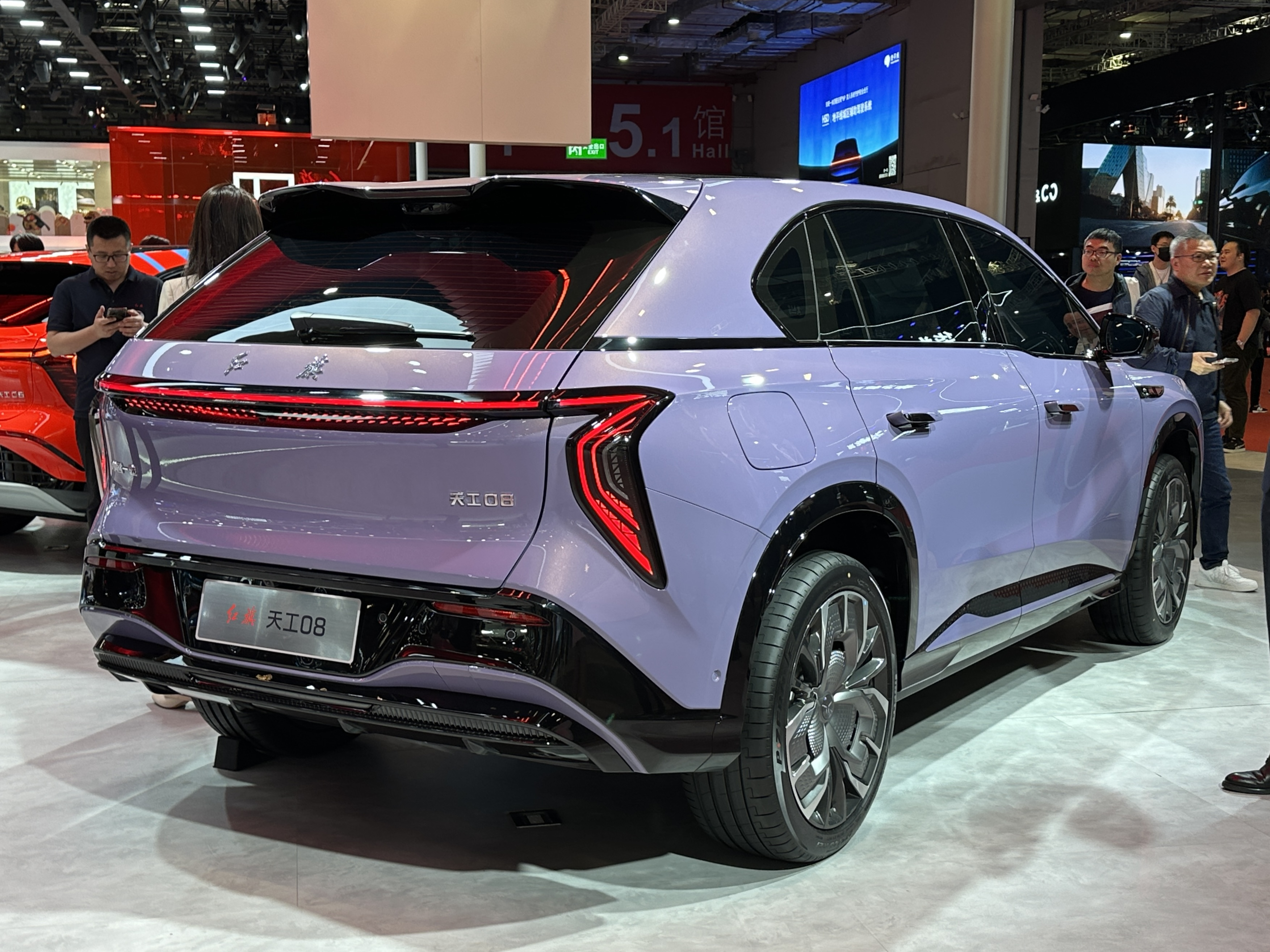
Rear view

Interior

== Specifications ==
The Tiangong 08 was offered in RWD and AWD. The RWD trim has a maximum power of 253 kW (344 PS; 339 hp), while the AWD adds a 202 kW (275 PS; 271 hp) front electric motor. The top speed is 200 km/h. Additionally, two battery pack options will be available: ternary lithium battery and lithium iron phosphate. The 111 kWh ternary lithium battery pack will provide the RWD with a range of 730 km (450 mi) and the AWD a range of 680 km (420 mi) (CLTC).

=== Information and specifications ===
| Trims | 111 kWh 2WD | 111 kWh 4WD | 111 kWh 4WD Pro |
|---|---|---|---|
| Acceleration (s) | 6.3 | 3.9 | 3.9 |
| Power consumption (kWh/100 km) | 20.6 | 21.9 | 21.9 |

== Safety ==
Euro NCAP test results Hongqi EHS7 Long Range 5-seater 111kWh (LHD) (2025)
| Test | Points | % |
|---|---|---|
| Overall: | 5 /5 stars | |
| Adult occupant: | 37.4 | 93% |
| Child occupant: | 42.0 | 85% |
| Pedestrian: | 52.2 | 82% |
| Safety assist: | 15.0 | 83% |

== Sales ==
| Year | China |
|---|---|
| 2024 | 2,084 |
| 2025 | 2,958 |
