= Hongqi Tiangong 06 =

Battery electric compact luxury crossover SUV

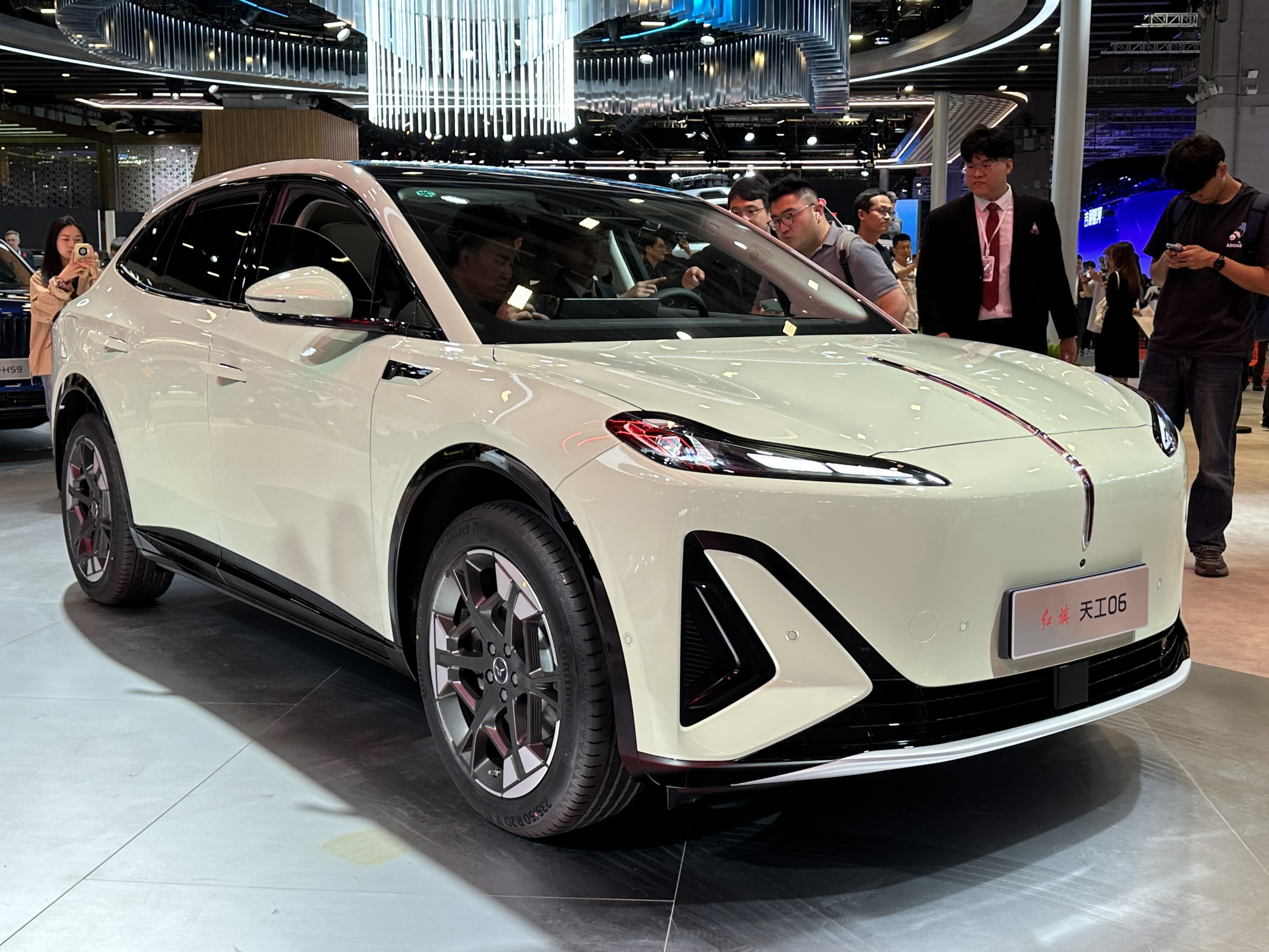

Overview
- Manufacturer: Hongqi (FAW Group)
- Also called: Hongqi EHS5 (export)
- Production: 2025–present
- Assembly: China: Changchun, Jilin

Body and chassis
- Class: Compact luxury crossover SUV (D)
- Body style: 5-door SUV
- Layout: Rear-motor, rear-wheel-drive; Dual-motor, all-wheel-drive
- Platform: Hongqi Tiangong Architecture
- Related: Hongqi Tiangong 05; Hongqi Tiangong 08

Powertrain
- Electric motor: Permanent magnet synchronous
- Power output: 253 kW (339 hp; 344 PS) (RWD); 455 kW (610 hp; 619 PS) (AWD)
- Battery: 111 kWh CATL Qilin NMC

Dimensions
- Wheelbase: 2,900 mm (114.2 in)
- Length: 4,750 mm (187.0 in)
- Width: 1,900 mm (74.8 in)
- Height: 1,640 mm (64.6 in)
- Curb weight: 2,205 kg (4,861 lb)

The Hongqi Tiangong 06 (Chinese: 红旗天工06) or Hongqi EHS5 is a battery electric compact luxury crossover SUV produced by Chinese automobile manufacturer Hongqi, a subsidiary of FAW Group.

== Overview ==
=== Hongqi E007 Concept ===
Originally was previewed as the Hongqi E007 Concept during the 2024 Beijing Auto Show, the production Hongqi Tiangong 06 was first shown at the 2025 Auto Shanghai.

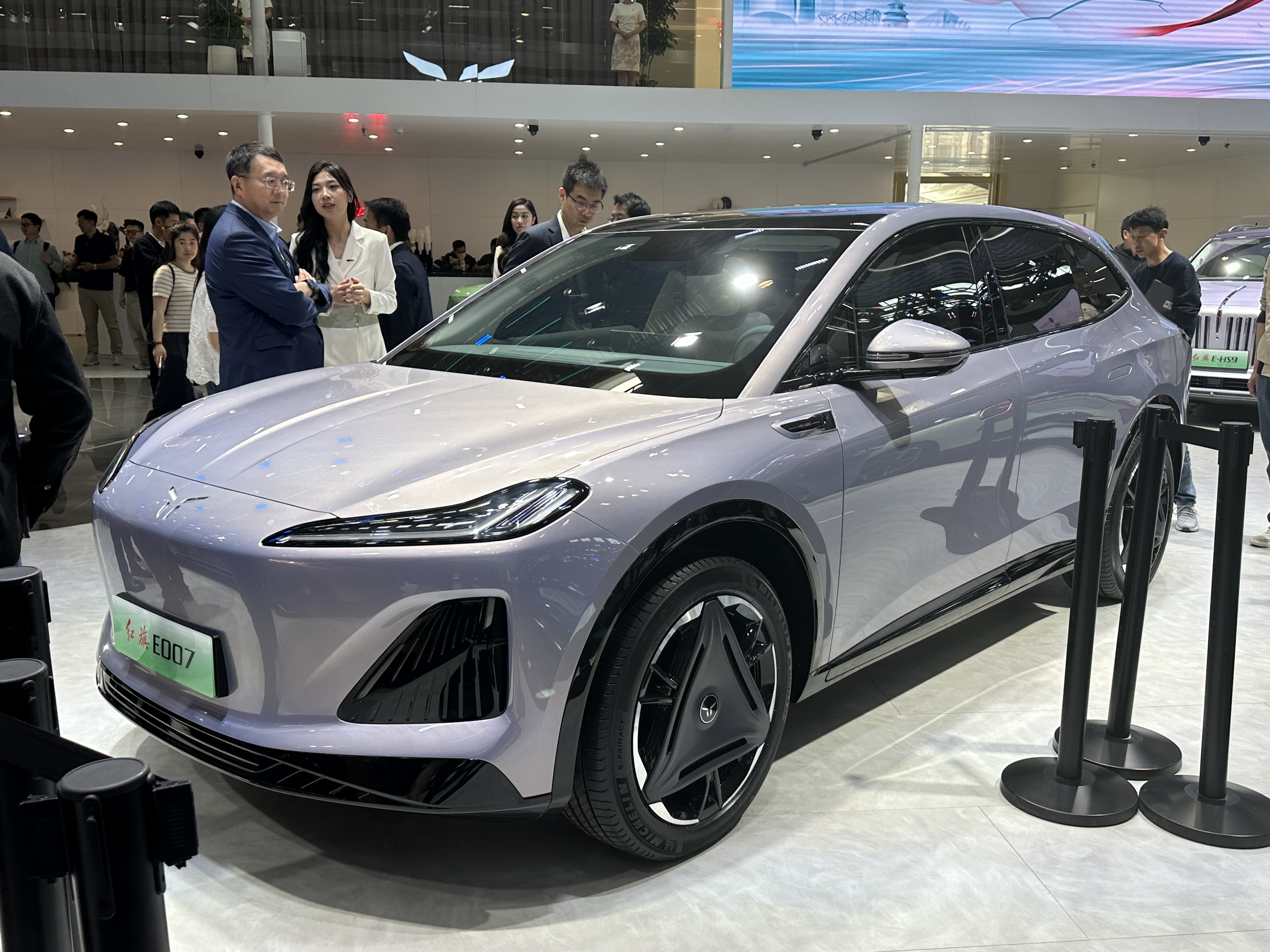
The Hongqi E007 Concept at 2024 Beijing Auto Show.

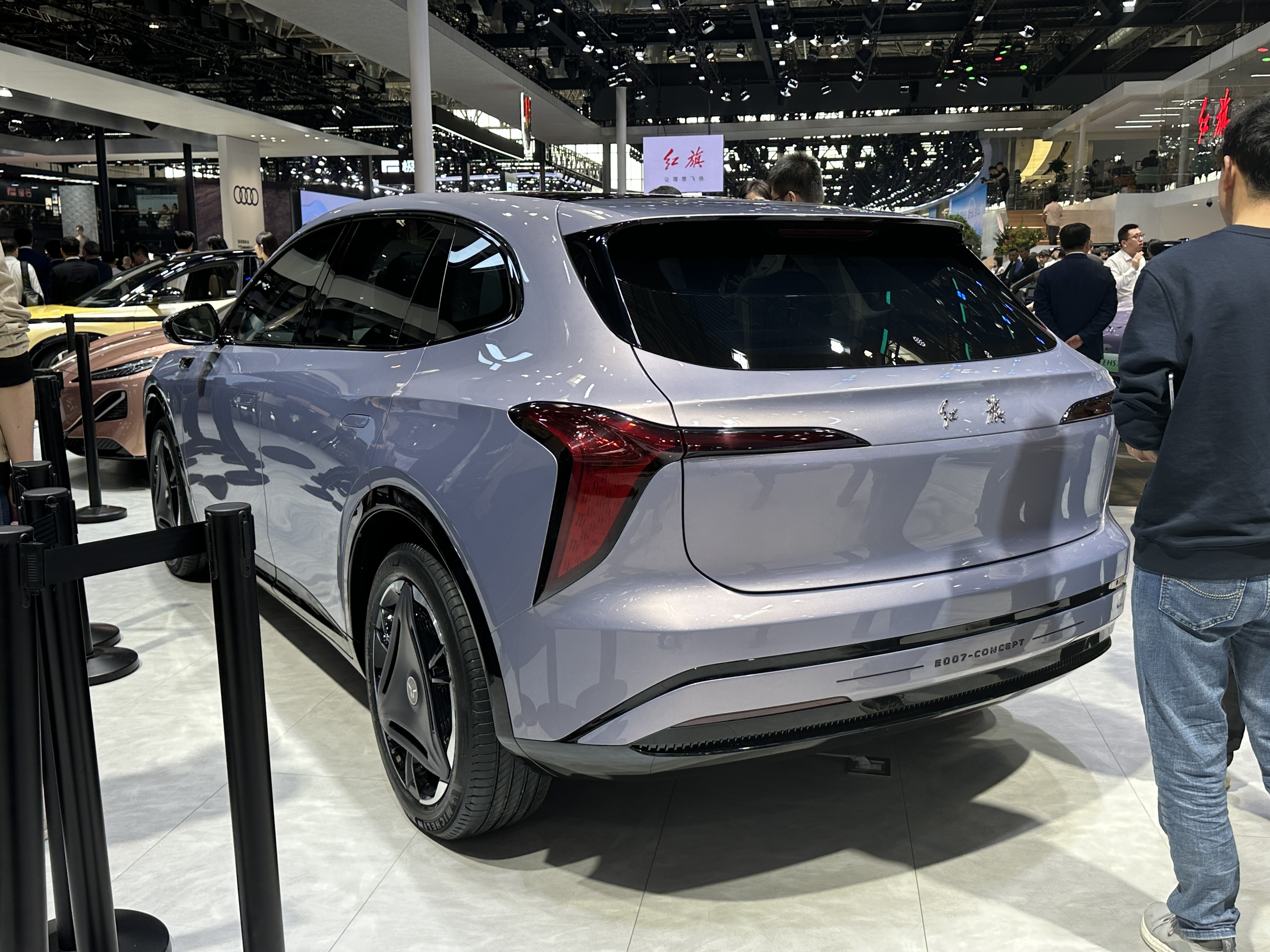
Rear view

=== Production model ===
On 12 November 2024, the China FAW Hongqi Brand New Energy Night was held in Shenzhen, and the third model of the Hongqi Tiangong series, the Tiangong 06 was released and was officially launched in 2025 in China.

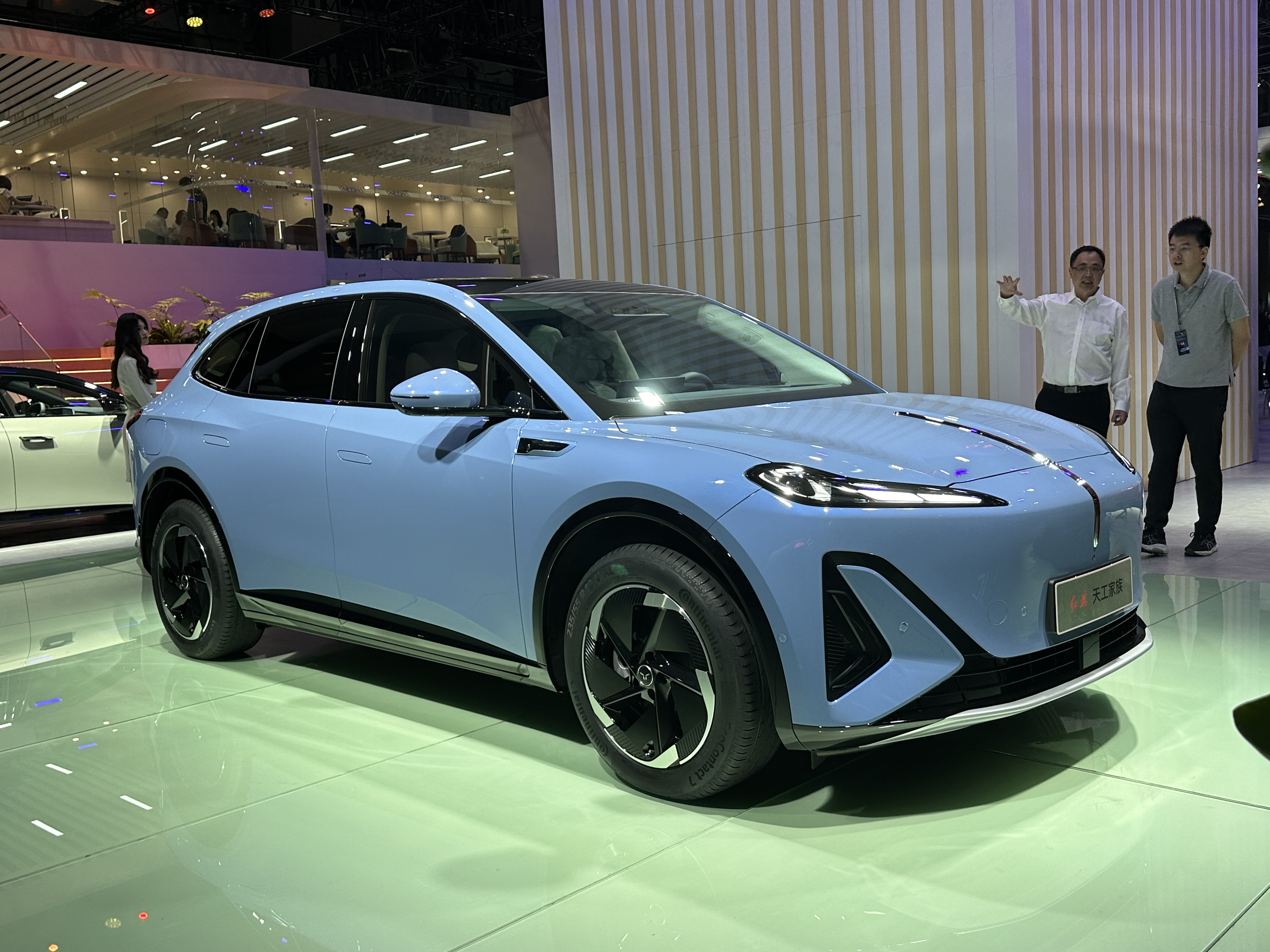
Hongqi Tiangong SUV (near-production model)

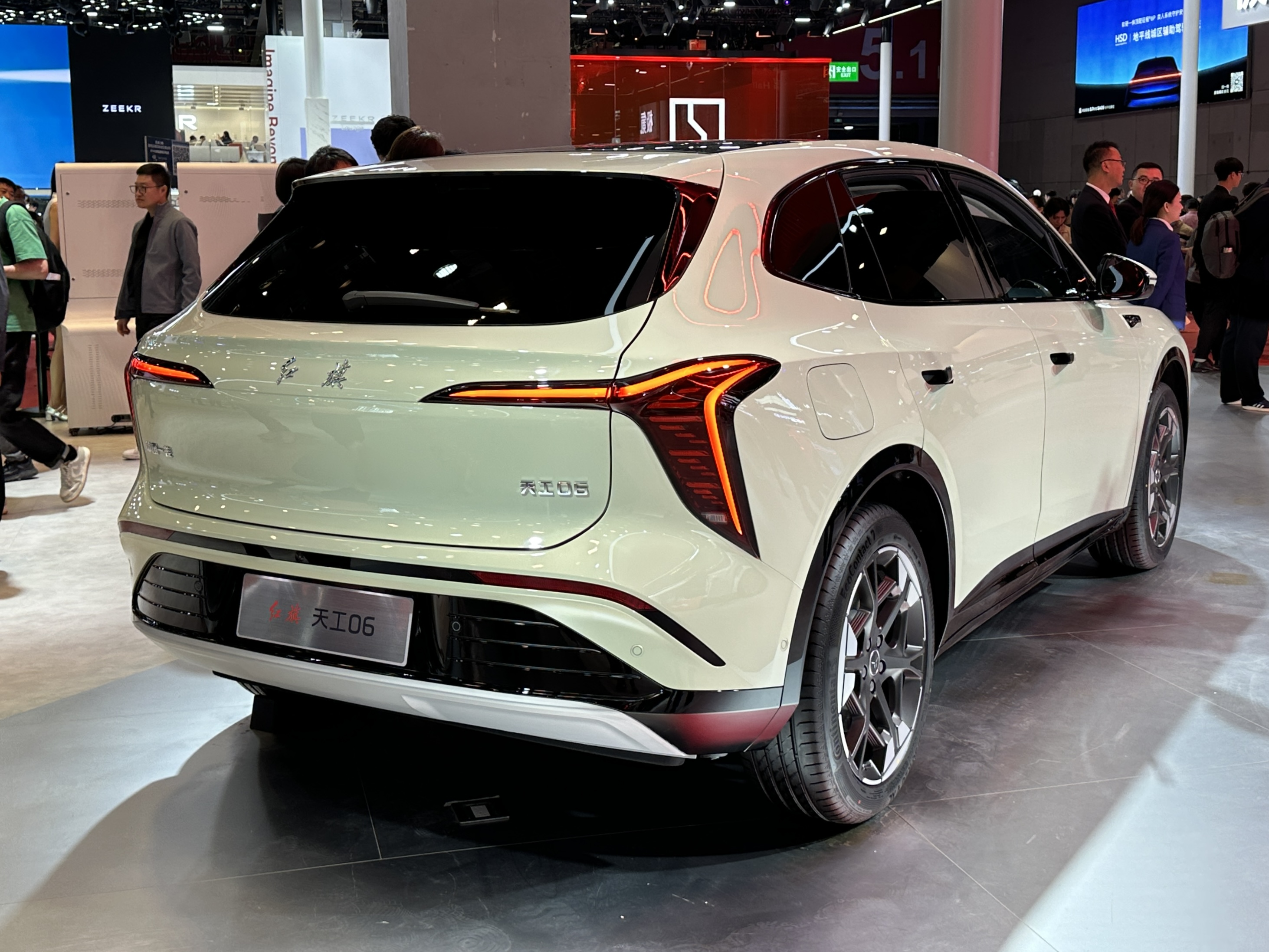
Rear view

Interior

== Safety ==
Euro NCAP test results Hongqi EHS5 'Basic' (LHD) (2025)
Test	Points	%
Overall:	5 /5 stars	
Adult occupant:	32.8	81%
Child occupant:	42.0	85%
Pedestrian:	47.2	74%
Safety assist:	14.8	82%

== Sales ==
Year	China
2025	1,098
