= Hongqi Tiangong 05 =

Battery electric mid-size sedan

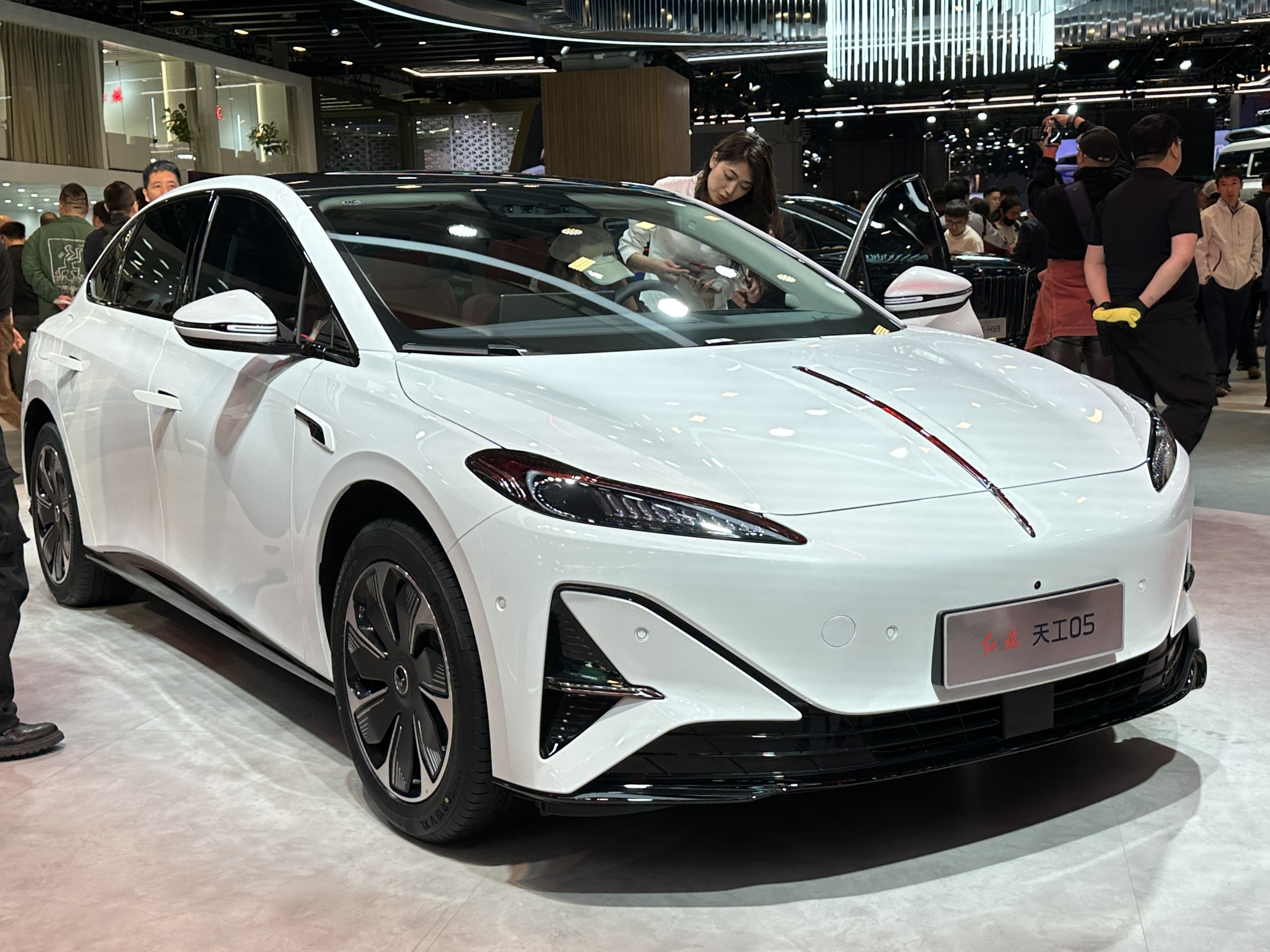

Overview
- Manufacturer: Hongqi (FAW Group)
- Also called: Hongqi EH5 (export)
- Production: 2025–present
- Assembly: China: Changchun, Jilin

Body and chassis
- Class: Mid-size car (D)
- Body style: 4-door sedan
- Layout: Rear-motor, rear-wheel-drive; Dual-motor, all-wheel-drive
- Platform: Hongqi Tiangong Architecture
- Related: Hongqi Tiangong 06; Hongqi Tiangong 08

Powertrain
- Electric motor: Permanent magnet synchronous
- Power output: 253 kW (339 hp; 344 PS) (RWD); 455 kW (610 hp; 619 PS) (AWD)
- Battery: 111 kWh CATL Qilin NMC

Dimensions
- Wheelbase: 2,900 mm (114.2 in)
- Length: 4,820 mm (189.8 in)
- Width: 1,915 mm (75.4 in)
- Height: 1,480 mm (58.3 in)
- Curb weight: 1,890 kg (4,167 lb)

The Hongqi Tiangong 05 (Chinese: 红旗天工05) or Hongqi EH5 is a battery electric mid-size sedan produced by Chinese automobile manufacturer Hongqi, a subsidiary of FAW Group.

== Overview ==
=== Hongqi E009 Concept ===
Originally was previewed as the Hongqi E009 Concept during the 2024 Beijing Auto Show, the production Tiangong 05 was first shown at the 2025 Auto Shanghai.

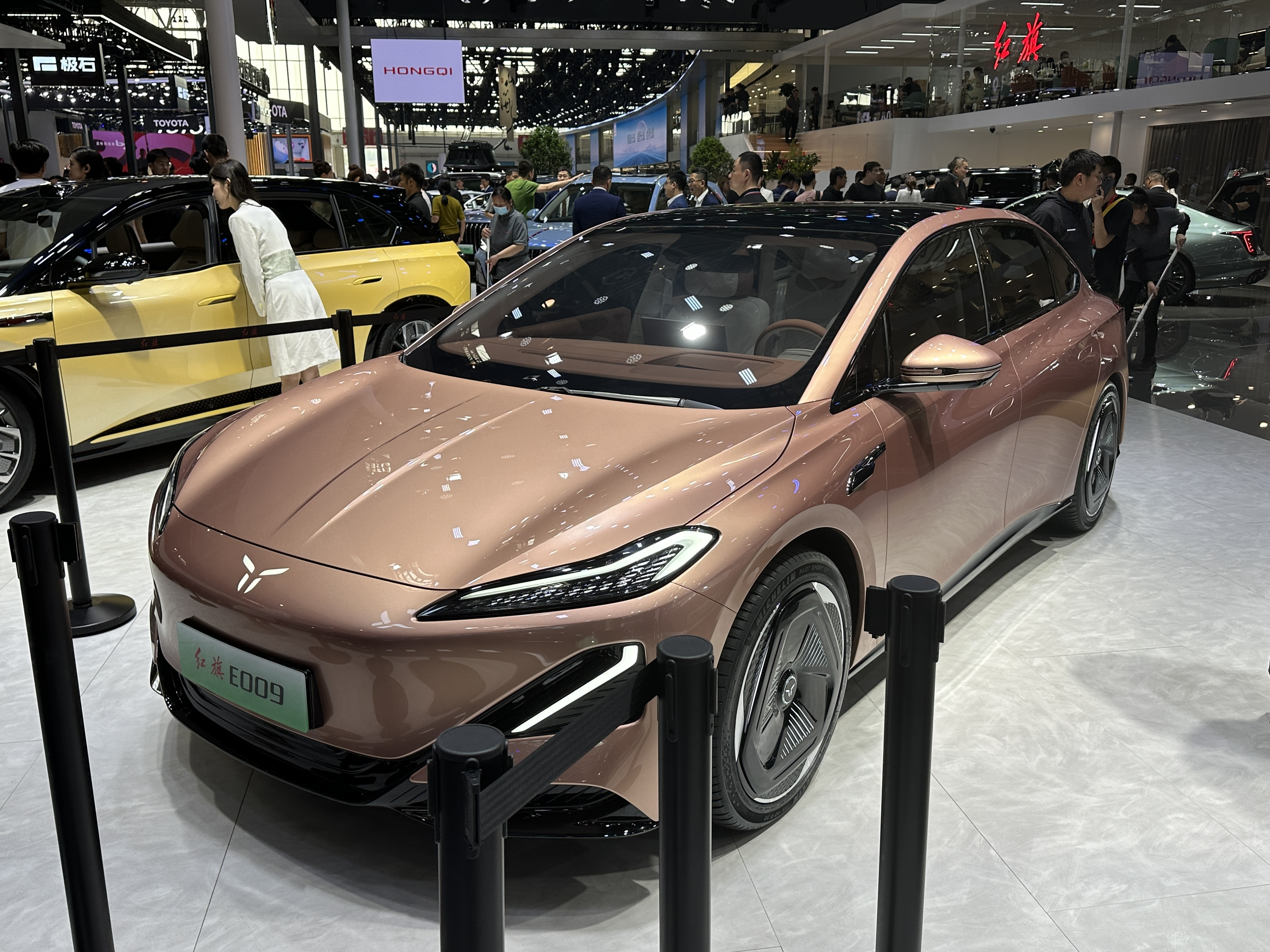
The Hongqi E009 Concept at 2024 Beijing Auto Show.

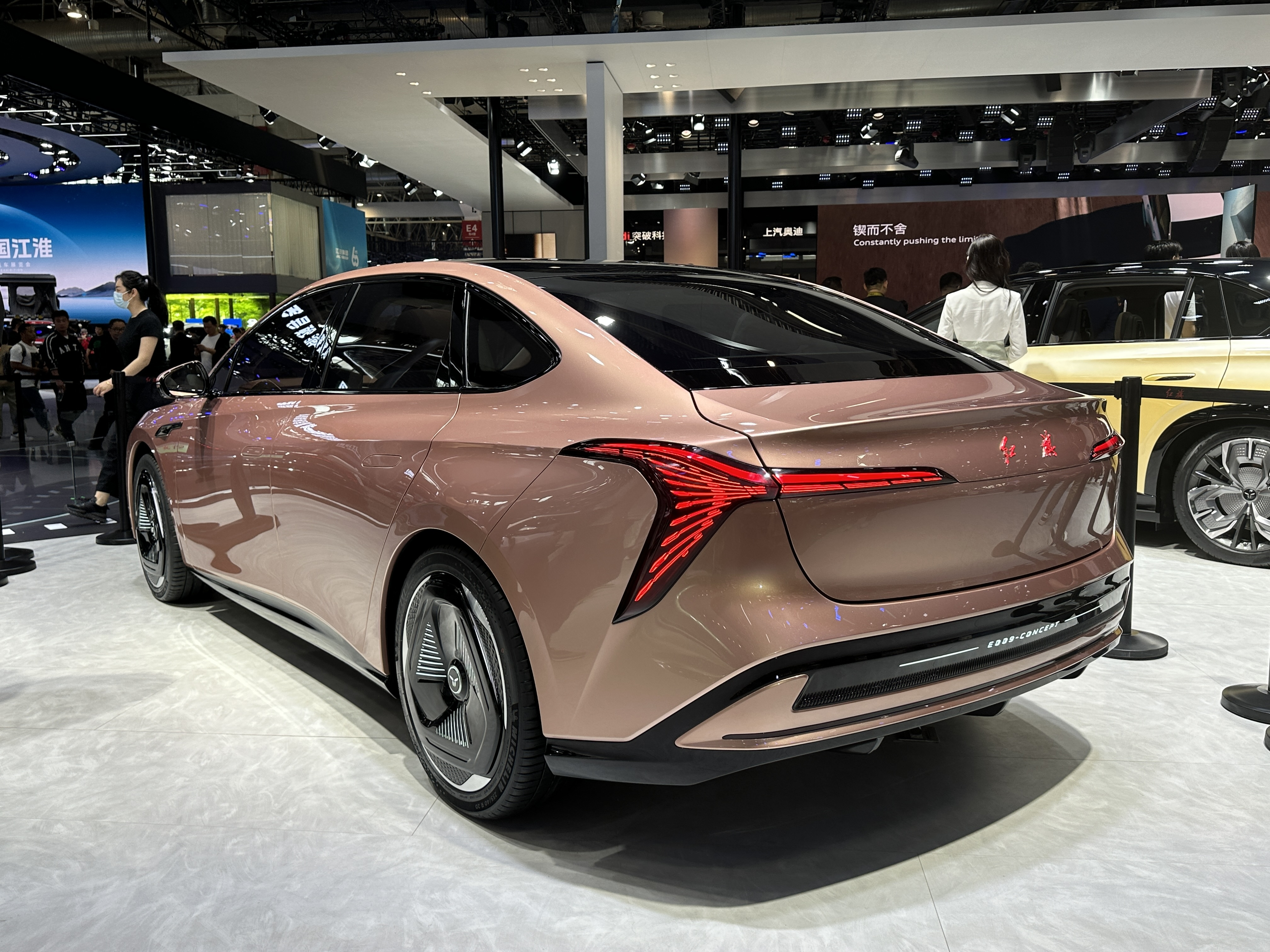
Rear view

=== Production model ===
On 12 November 2024, the China FAW Hongqi Brand New Energy Night was held in Shenzhen, and the second model of the Hongqi Tiangong series, the Tiangong 05 was released and was officially launched in 2025 on China.

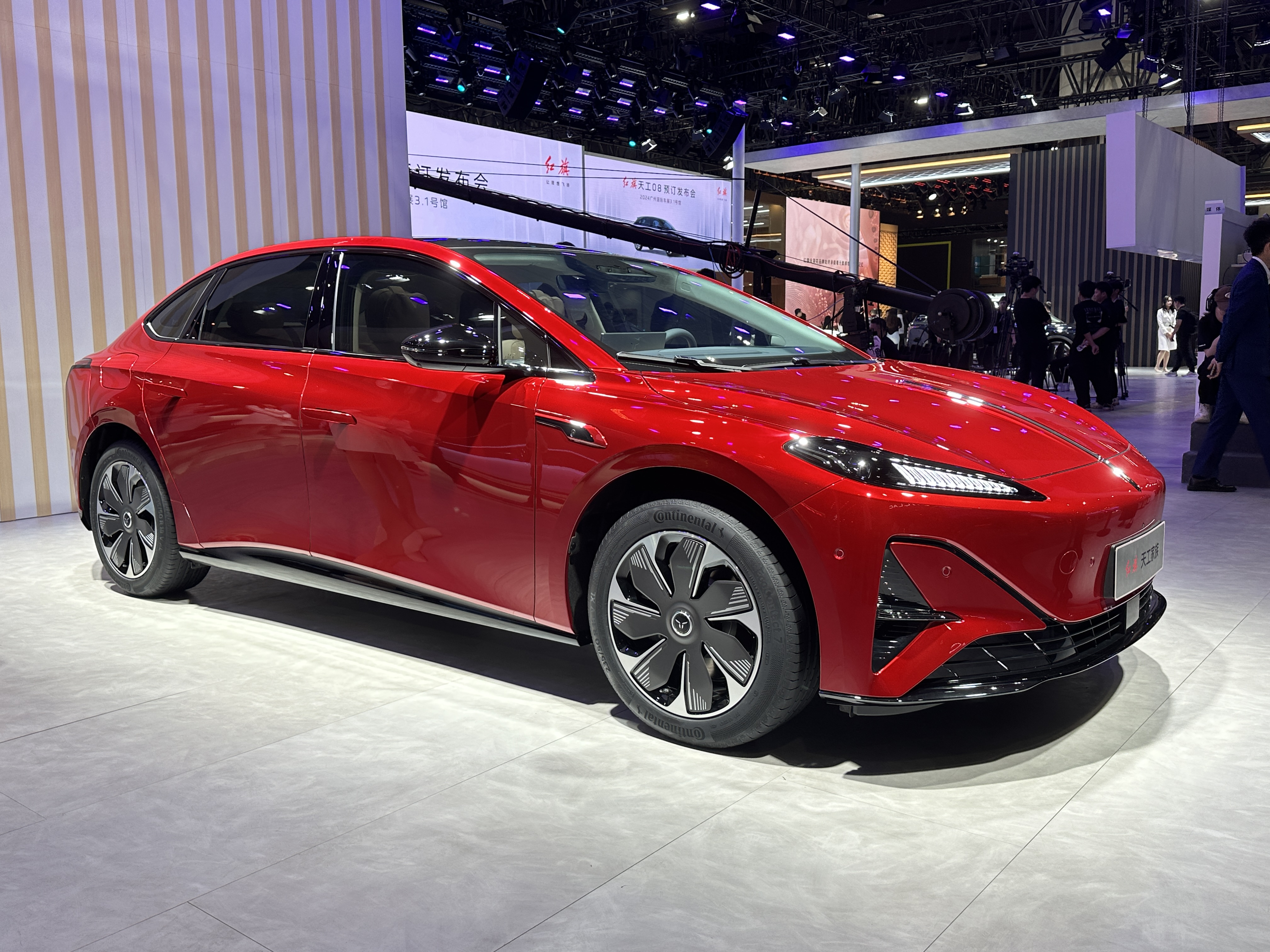
Hongqi Tiangong Sedan (near-production model)

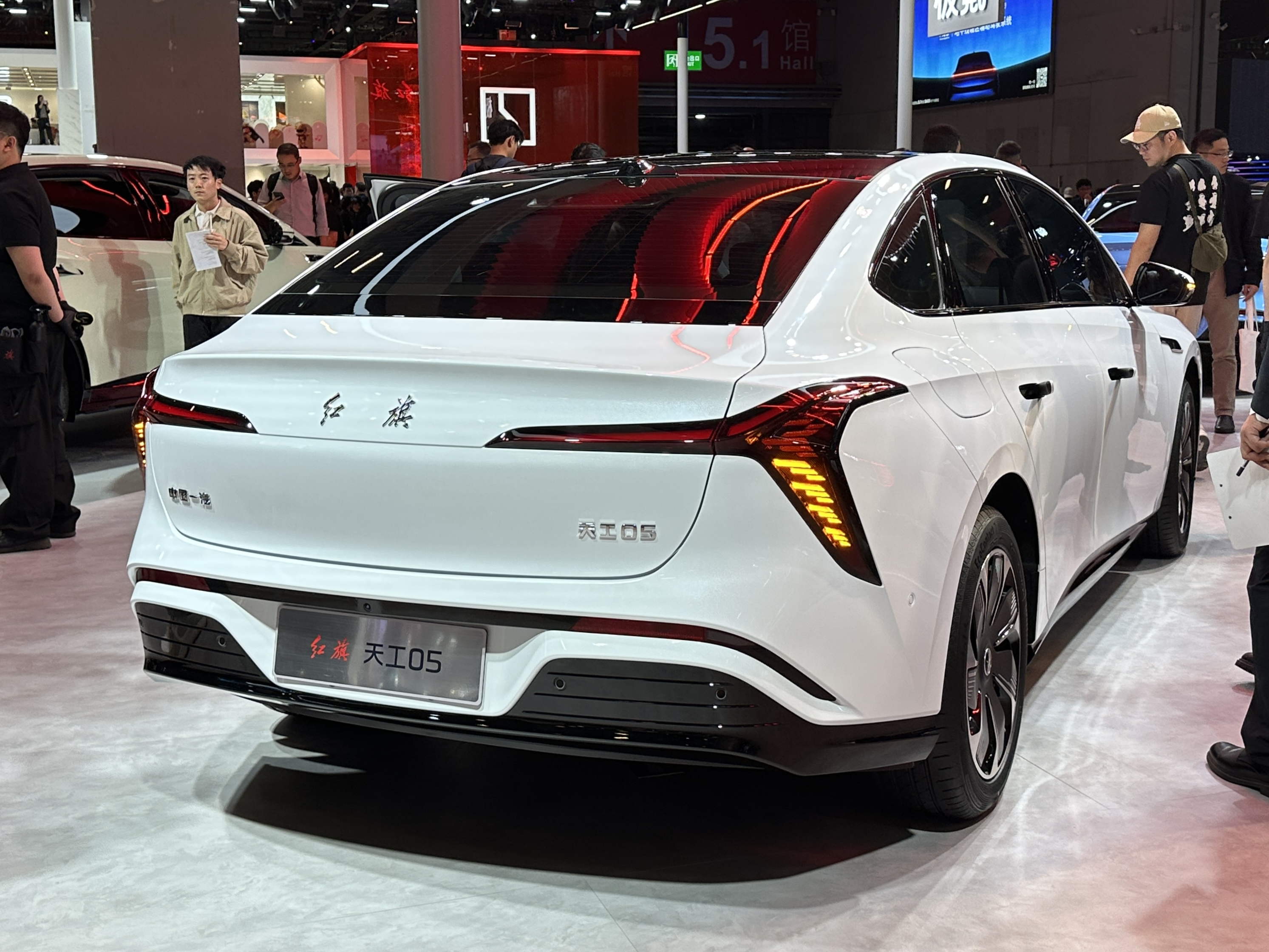
Rear view

== Sales ==
Year	China
2025	3,057
