= Renault R17 Electric Restomod x Ora Ïto =

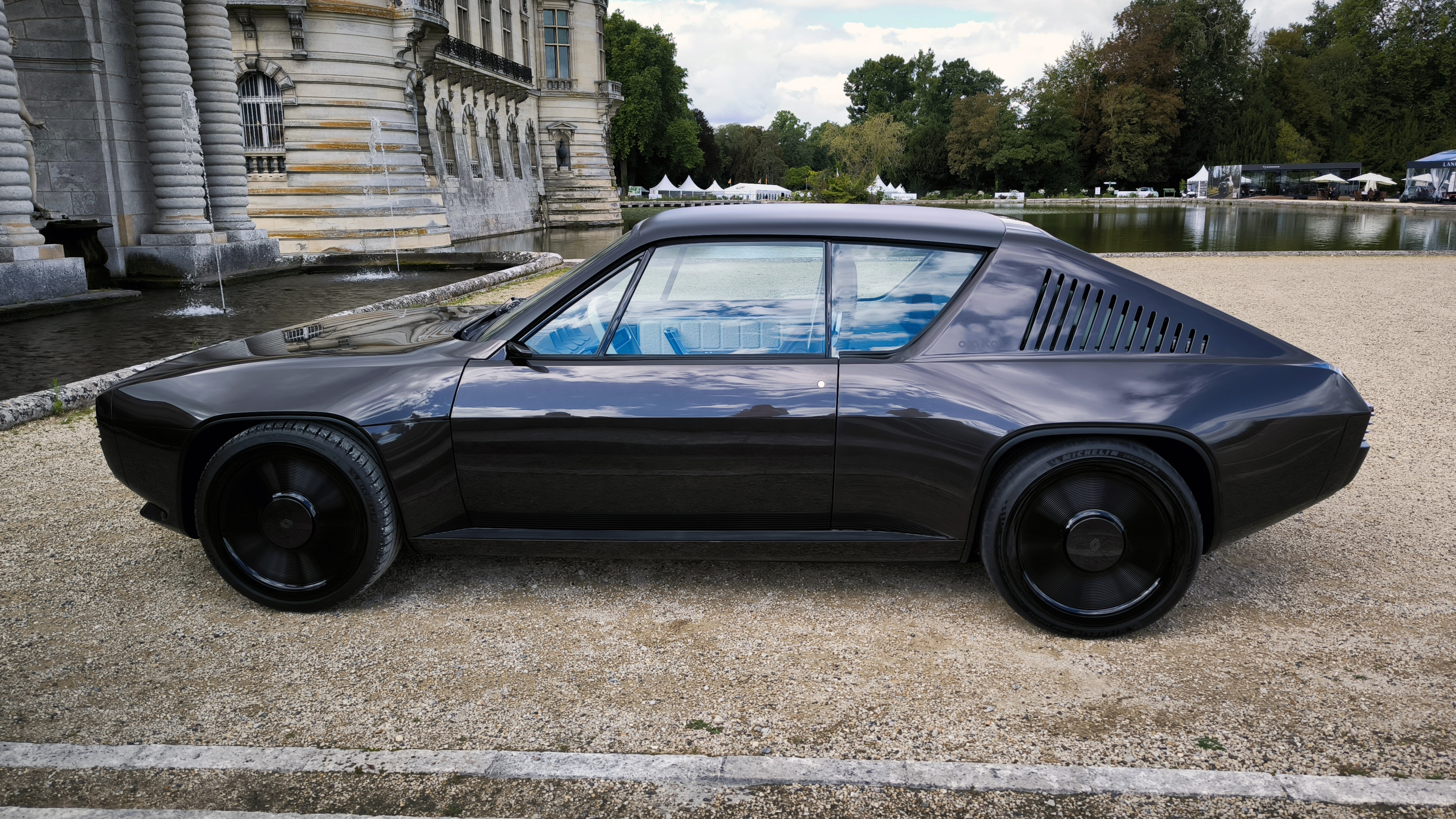

Overview
- Manufacturer: Renault
- Production: 2024
- Designer: Ora Ito

Body and chassis
- Class: Concept car
- Body style: 2-door fastback hatchback coupé
- Layout: Rear-motor, Rear-wheel-drive
- Doors: 2

Powertrain
- Electric motor: 270 hp Permanent magnet syncronus

Dimensions
- Curb weight: 1,400 kg (3,086 lb)

The Renault R17 Electric Restomod x Ora Ïto is an electric concept car developed by the French car manufacturer Renault and presented in 2024.

== Presentation ==
The R17 Electric Restomod was presented at the Chantilly Concours d'Elegance 2024 on 15 September 2024, and then at the 2024 Paris Motor Show on 15 October. It is a unique concept car with an electric engine, based on a 1971 Renault 17, completely redesigned by the Marseille-based designer Ora Ito, hence its name Renault R17 Electric Restomod x Ora Ïto.

== Specifications ==
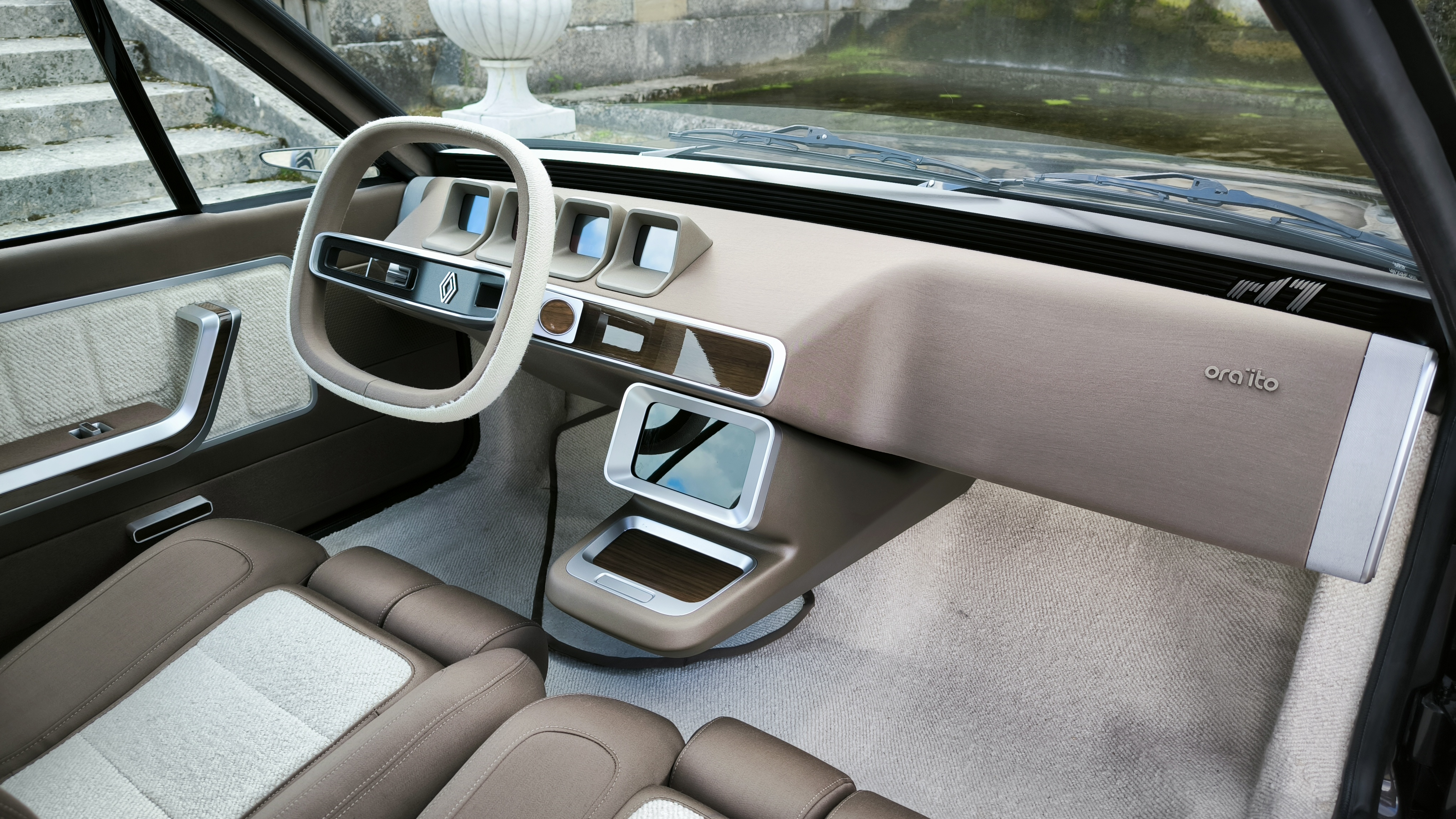
View of interior

The R17 Electric Restomod is based on the original self-supporting body of a Renault 17, and retains its general line but modernizes it. The round headlights are replaced by rectangular projectors, the wings are widened by 17 cm and the wheel arches are redesigned. The body of the coupe is painted in a "Galactic Brown" color.

The 1.6-liter four-cylinder thermal engine was replaced by a 270 hp electric motor positioned on the rear axle.

== See also ==
- Renault 15 and 17
