= Kilow La Bagnole =

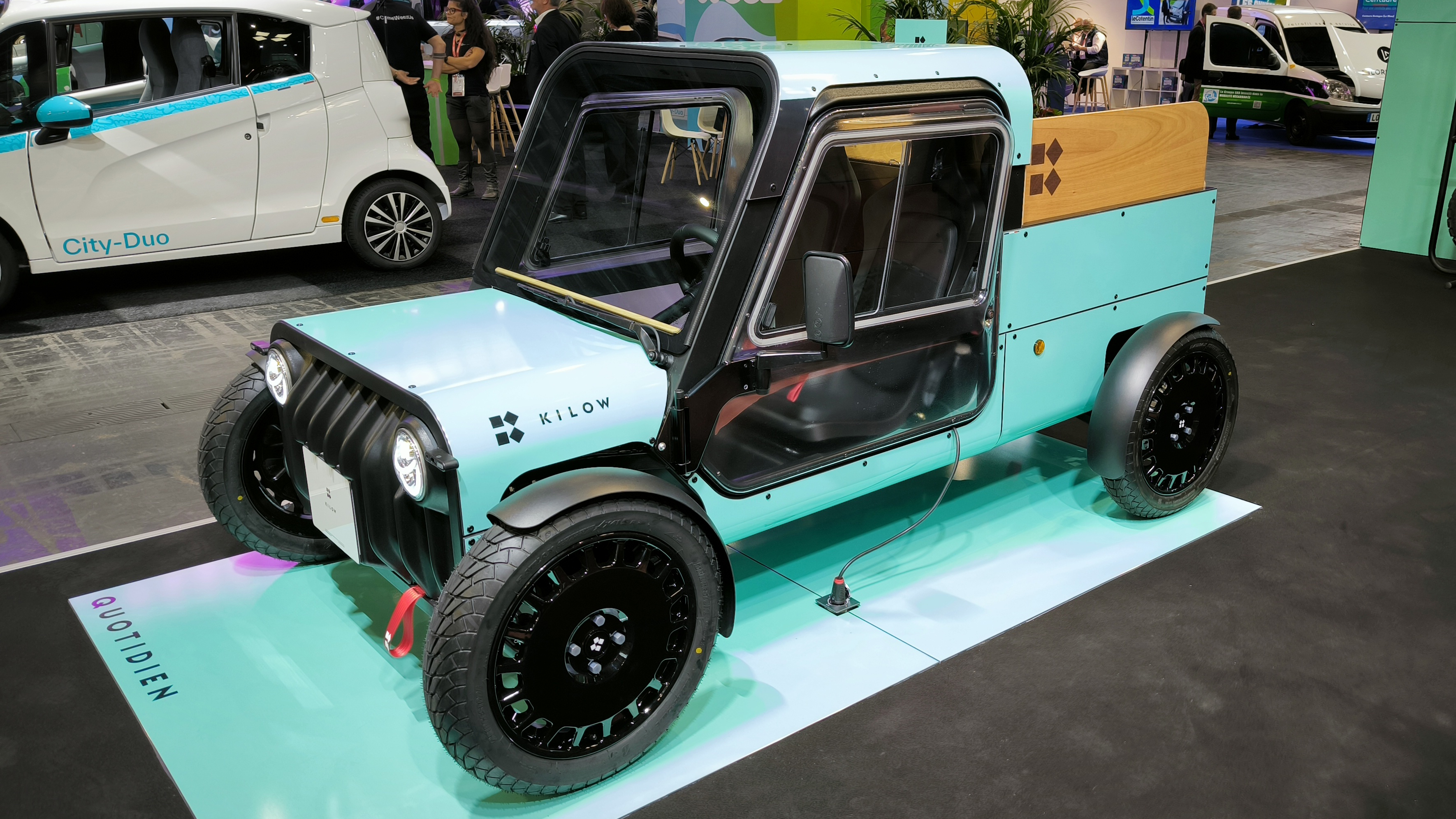
- La Bagnole at the 2024 Paris Motor Show.

Overview
- Manufacturer: Savoy International; Kilow
- Production: 2024 (to commence)
- Assembly: France: Haute-Savoie
- Designer: Léo Choisel

Body and chassis
- Class: Quadricycle

Powertrain
- Battery: 1× or 2× 5.6 kWh nickel-cobalt-manganese
- Range: 70 km (43 mi); 140 km (87 mi)

Dimensions
- Curb weight: 283 kg (624 lb)

The Kilow La Bagnole is a light quadricycle L6e limited to 45 km/h (28 mph) or heavy quadricycle L7e limited to 80 km/h (50 mph). It was presented at the 2022 Paris Motor Show.

At the 2024 Paris Motor Show, the manufacturer will exhibit three examples on a 100 m^{2} (1,100 sq ft) stand.
