= Pilotcar =

Automotive company

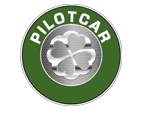
- Type: Public company (Société Anonyme)
- Industry: Automotive, mobility ecosystem
- Founded: October 1, 2011; 14 years ago in Bursa, Turkey
- Headquarters: Bursa, Turkey
- Area served: Worldwide; 42 countries
- Products: Electric car
- Owner: Ahmet Özkılıç; Şükrü Özkılıç; Merve Özkılıç Usal
- Website: pilotcar.com.tr/en/

Pilotcar is an automotive industry based in Turkey. The company was founded in 2011 and has been producing electric micro cars, golf carts, Utility vehicles, and street-legal vehicles. Its headquarters is located in Bursa, Nilüfer. Pilotcar's subsidiaries include Pilot Koltuk, which produces car seats, and automotive part manufacturers HPA Plastik and Özkılıç Otomotiv.

Pilotcar has factories in Bursa, Turkey and Fort Myers, Florida in the United States.

The company exports its vehicles worldwide, with a primary focus on North America and Europe.

== History ==
In 2014, Pilotcar made its first export, and in 2017, it began R&D work on street-legal vehicles. It started infrastructure work for its European operations by opening an office and warehouse in Bulgaria.

In 2018, Pilotcar established Pilotcar EV Inc. in Florida, Fort Myers, and activated its production facility for the United States.

In 2019, with the PC-2 SL model in the category of L6e-A, Pilotcar became the first domestic company to have a street-legal vehicle in its category in Europe and Turkey.

In 2020, the P-1000 model was launched for sale in all EU countries and Turkey.

In 2021, the new PC-4 SL model in the L7e category of Street-legal vehicles passed all tests successfully and received pre-approval.

In 2022, the P-1000 production line was activated, and the first P-1000 was produced in serial manufacture.

In 2024, the P2 City will be presented at the Paris Motor Show.

In 2025, the P2 City is the brand's first city car without a license to be marketed.

In 2025, an agreement was reached with Yamaha Golf Car Company for the North America distributorship of Pilotcar-branded utility vehicles.

== See also ==
The electric mini-truck P-1000, which is street-legal, is used as a utility vehicle in the fleets of organizations such as PTT, Aras Kargo, Aselsan, Ekol, Pınar, and Amazon.

- Automotive industry in Turkey
- Turkish Wikipedia Article about Pilotcar

== Models ==
=== Golf and Utility Vehicles ===
- PC-2
- PC-4
- PC-6
- PC-W
- PC-H
- PC-A

=== Street Legal Vehicles ===
- P-1000
- PC-2 SL
- PC-4 SL
- P2 City
- PC-W SL
