= Alpine A390 =

Battery electric compact crossover SUV

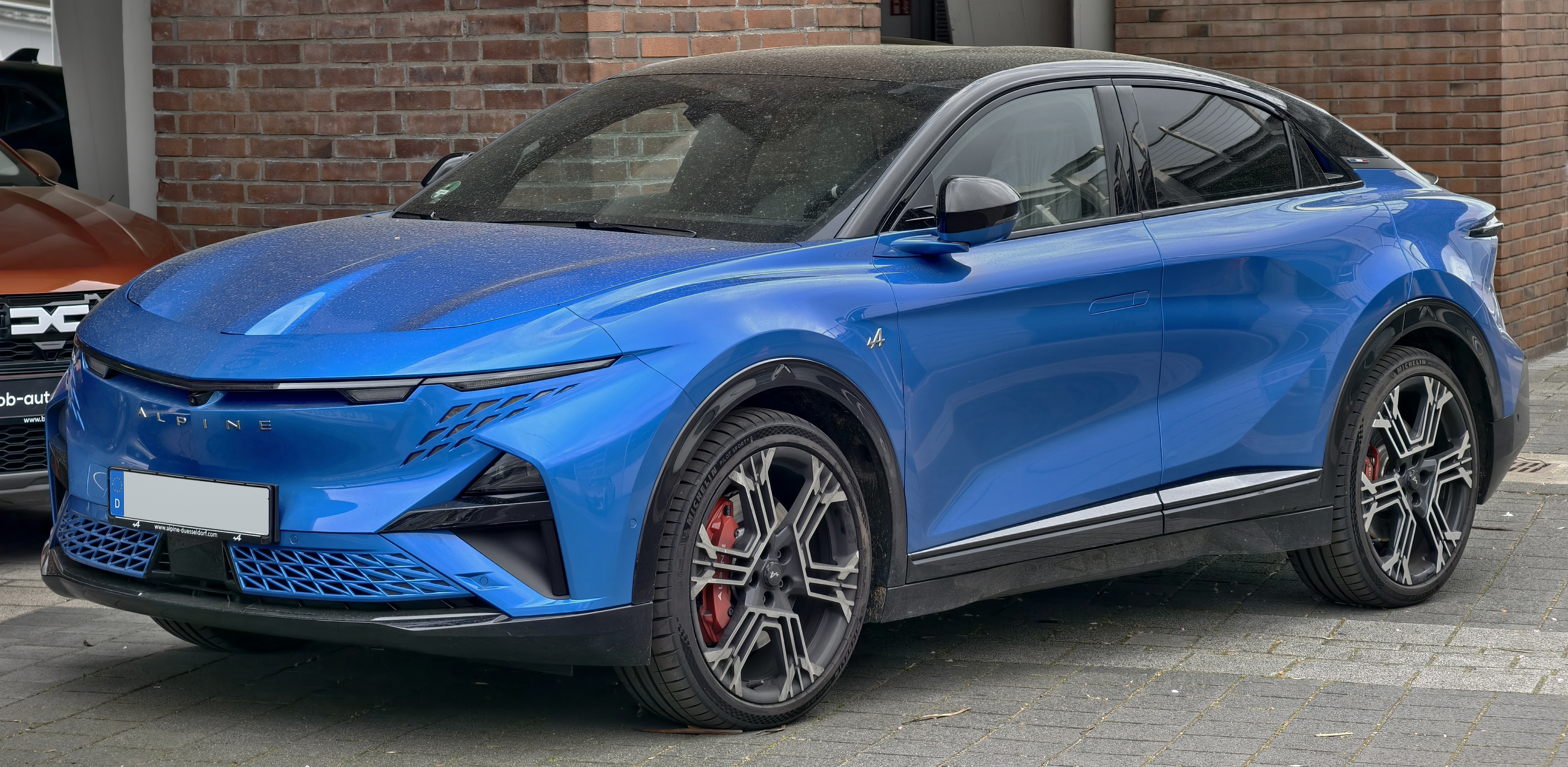

Overview
- Manufacturer: Alpine
- Model code: DZ110
- Production: 2026–present
- Assembly: France: Dieppe

Body and chassis
- Class: Compact crossover SUV
- Body style: 5-door coupe SUV
- Layout: Tri-motor, all-wheel-drive
- Platform: AmpR Medium

Powertrain
- Electric motor: Wound-rotor synchronous at the front; 2× permanent magnet synchronous at the rear
- Power output: A390 GT: 295 kW (400 hp); A390 GTS: 345 kW (470 hp)
- Transmission: 1-speed fixed gear
- Battery: 89 kWh
- Range: A390 GT: 555 km (345 miles); A390 GTS: 515 km (320 miles)
- Plug-in charging: A390 GT: 150 kW DC / 22 kW AC; A390 GTS: 190 kW DC / 22 kW AC

Dimensions
- Wheelbase: 2,708 mm (106.6 in)
- Length: 4,615 mm (181.7 in)
- Width: 1,885 mm (74.2 in)
- Height: 1,532 mm (60.3 in)
- Kerb weight: 2,121 kg (4,676 lb)

The Alpine A390 is a battery electric compact crossover SUV by French automobile manufacturer Alpine. First shown in concept form as the Alpine A390_β at the 2024 Paris Motor Show, the production model was unveiled on 27 May 2025, and Alpine will begin accepting orders on 21 November 2025 for deliveries in the first quarter of 2026. It is the second of seven "Dream Garage" fully-electric models which Alpine intends to release by 2030.

== Overview ==
The Alpine A390 (internal code DZ110) is set to be produced domestically in the brand's historic Manufacture Alpine Dieppe Jean Rédélé.

The A390 is based on the modular AmpR Medium technical platform of the Renault–Nissan–Mitsubishi Alliance, also used by the Renault Scenic E-Tech, Nissan Ariya and Leaf. The car features "vehicle-to-grid" (V2G) bidirectional charging.

Two variants of the A390 have been announced: the GT, with 295kW (400hp) of power, 661 Nm (488 foot-lbs) of torque, an electronically-limited top speed of 200km/hour (124mph), and acceleration of 4.8 second 0-100km/hour (0-60mph), 20-inch wheels a 150 kW charge rate, and a WLTP range of 555 km (345 miles), with prices starting at €67,500; and the GTS, with 346kW (470hp), 824 Nm (608 foot-lbs) of torque, an electronically-limited top speed of 220km/hour (137mph), acceleration of 3.9 seconds 0-100km, 21-inch wheels, a 190 kW charge rate, and a WLTP range of 515 km (320 miles), with prices starting at €78,000. Both variants share an 89 kWh NMC battery pack and weigh 2,121 kg (4,676 lbs).

A patented, "overtake" function, activated by a red button on the steering wheel, provides ten seconds of additional boost with a thirty-second cooldown period, or five seconds of boost with a fifteen-second cooldown period. The button also controls an optimised drag-strip launch function.

The interior is finished in blue leather, features two 12-inch screens, and both manual and on-screen controls.

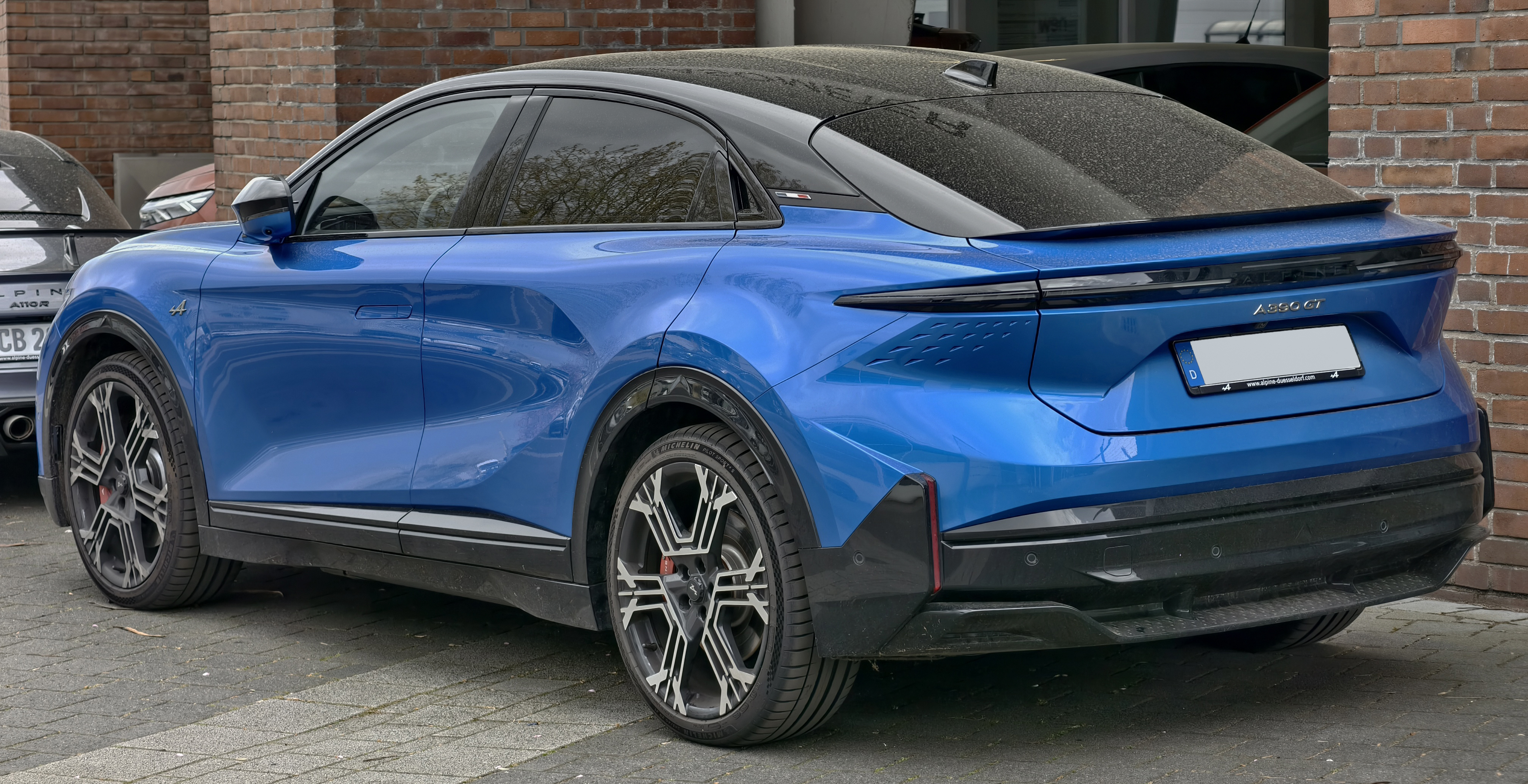
Rear view

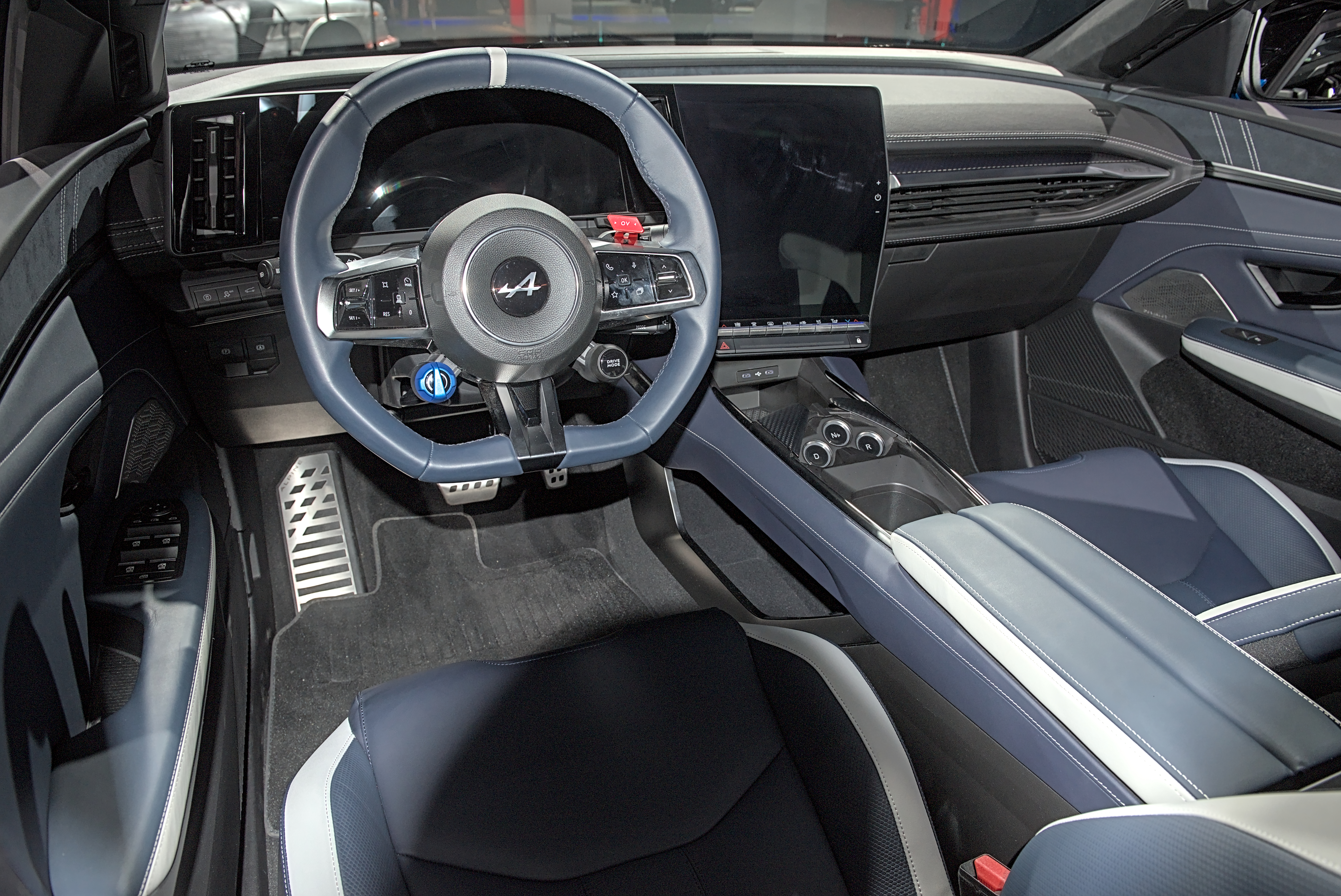
Interior

== Concept ==
On 11 October 2024, as a prelude to the 2024 Paris Motor Show, Alpine presented the Alpine A390_β concept car, a precursor to the production Alpine A390, the brand's first SUV. The concept featured rear doors that open in reverse and a glass roof.

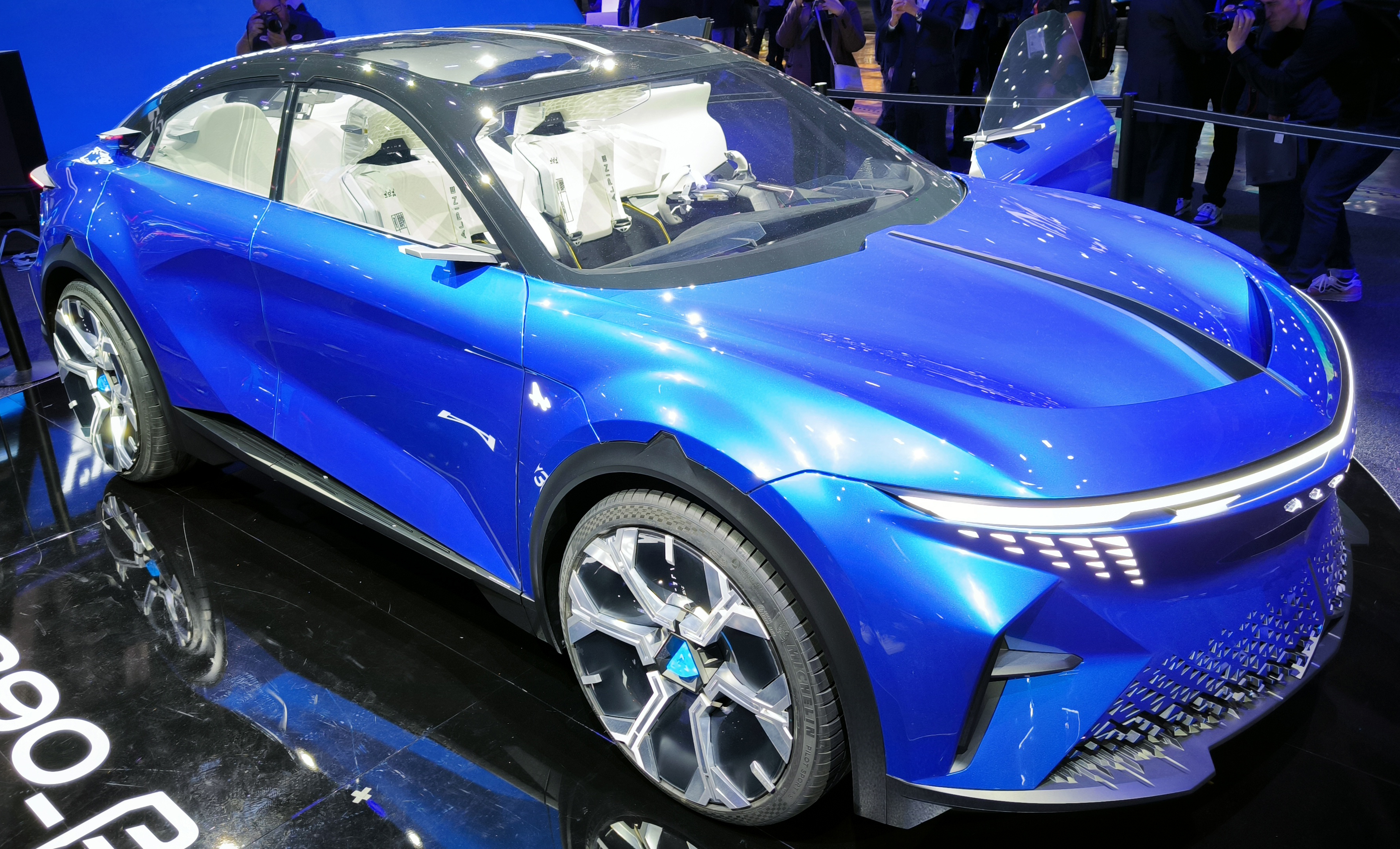
Alpine A390_β Concept

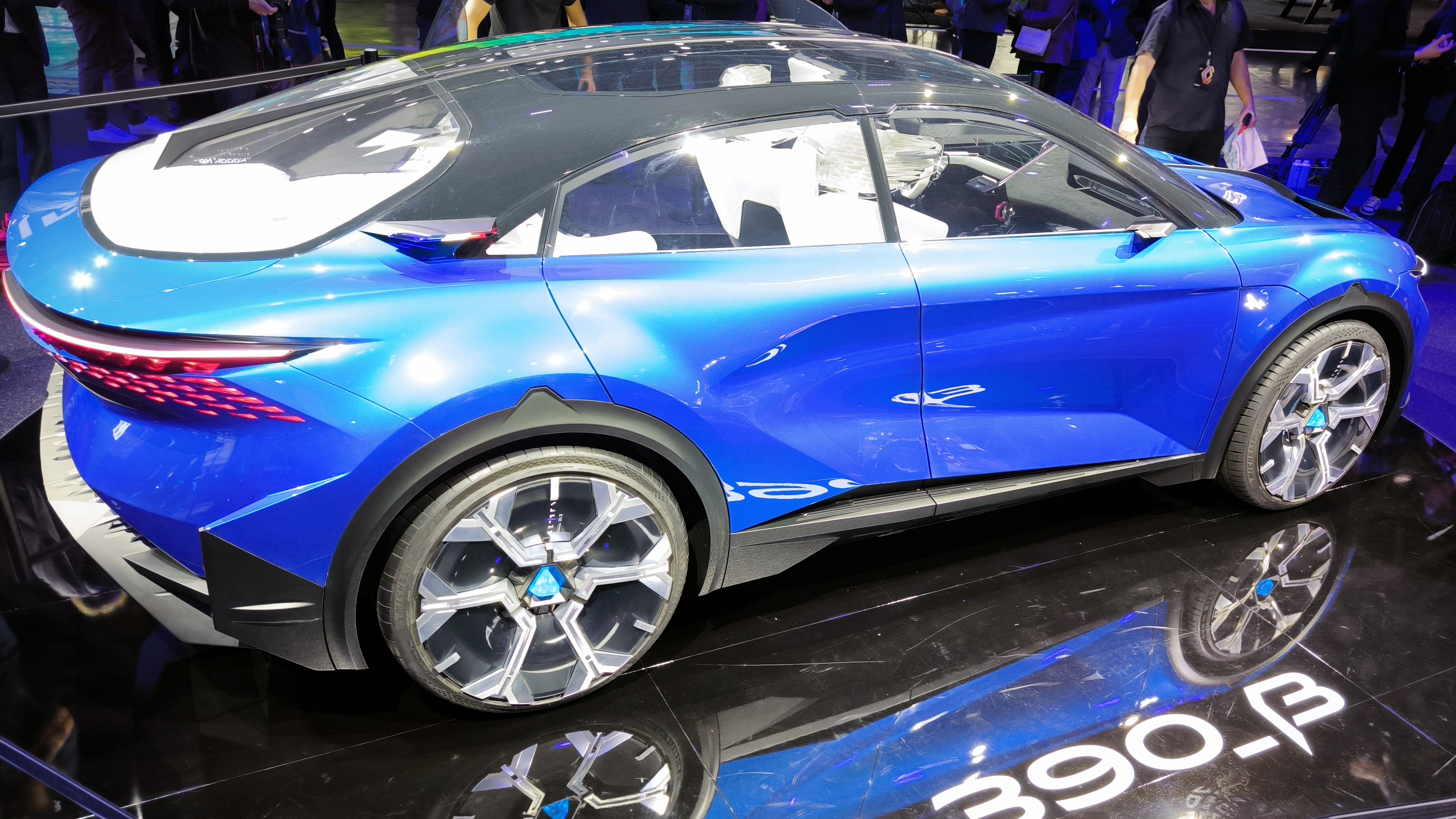
Rear view

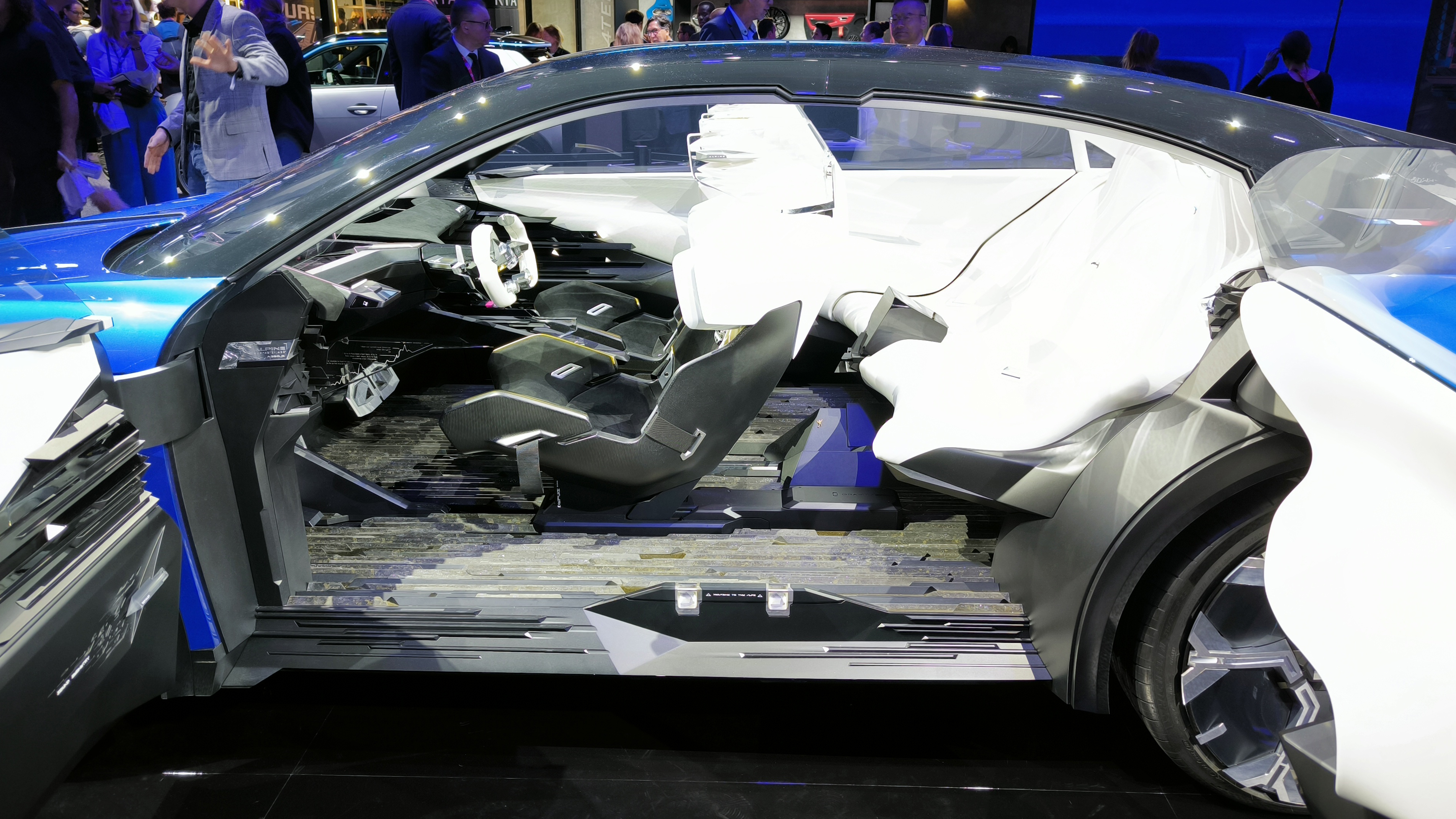
Interior

== Safety ==
Euro NCAP test results Alpine A390 GT 400ch (LHD) (2025)
| Test | Points | % |
|---|---|---|
| Overall: | 4 /5 stars | |
| Adult occupant: | 29.9 | 74% |
| Child occupant: | 41.7 | 85% |
| Pedestrian: | 50.6 | 80% |
| Safety assist: | 14.0 | 77% |

== Production ==
| Calendar year | Production |
|---|---|
| 2025 | 599 |
