= CA72 =

CA72 or CA-72 may refer to:

- USS Pittsburgh (CA-72), a World War II heavy cruiser
- California State Route 72, a highway in the US state of California
- Hongqi CA72, a fullsize goldleash car
- Owari-Ichinomiya Station, a railway station in Ichinomiya, Aichi (station code CA72)
