= Hongqi CA770 =

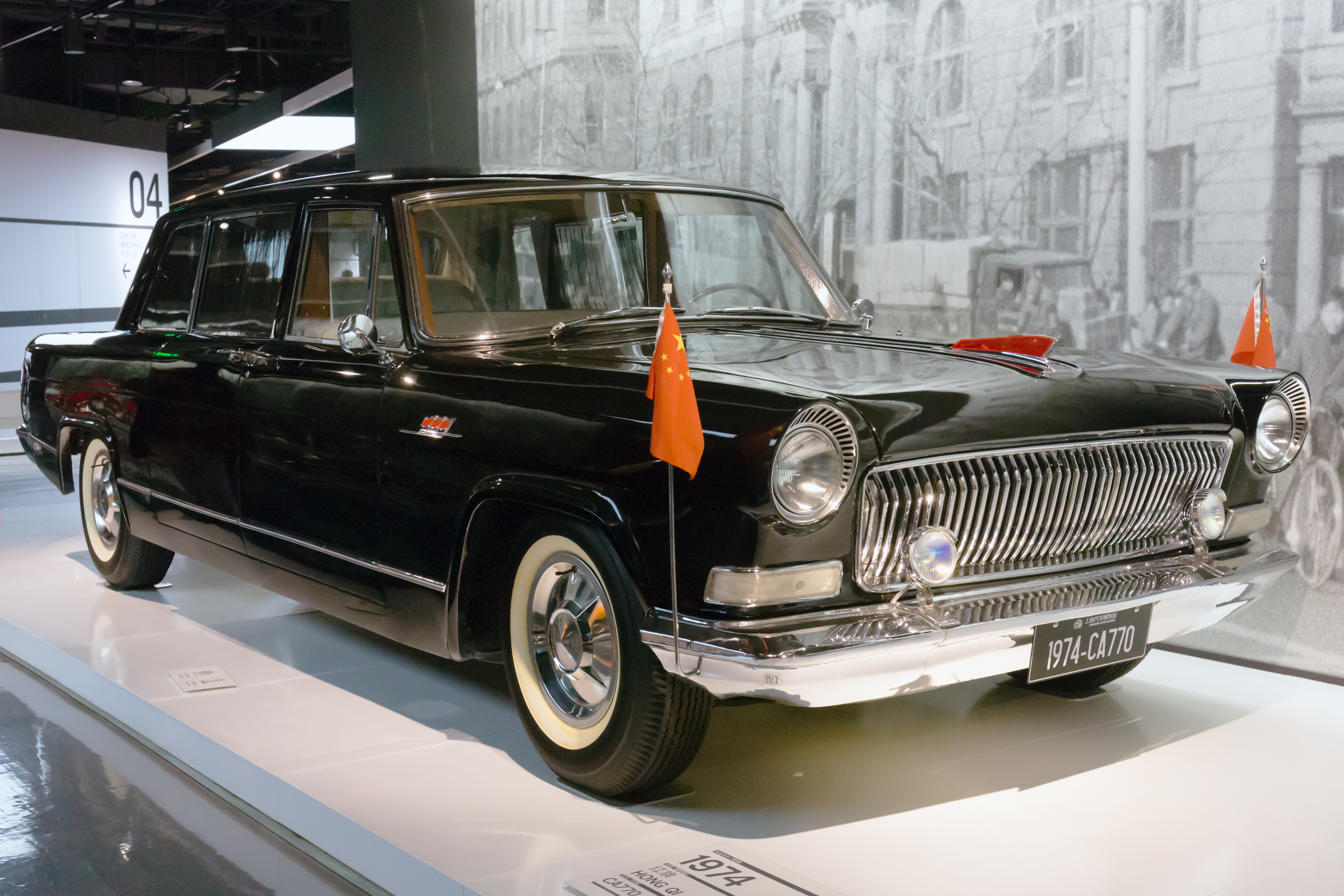

Overview
- Manufacturer: Hongqi (FAW)
- Production: 1966–1981; Variations built until 1999
- Assembly: China: Changchun

Body and chassis
- Class: Luxury car
- Layout: FR layout

Powertrain
- Engine: 5,655 cc (345 cu in) 8V100Q V8; 5,766 cc (352 cu in) Ford Windsor V8
- Transmission: 4 speed automatic

Dimensions
- Wheelbase: CA770: 3,720 mm (146.5 in); CA771: 3,070 mm (120.9 in); CA773: 3,420 mm (134.6 in)
- Length: CA770: 5,980 mm (235.4 in); CA771: 5,330 mm (209.8 in); CA773: 5,580 mm (219.7 in)
- Width: 1,990 mm (78.3 in)
- Height: 1,620 mm (63.8 in)
- Curb weight: 2,730–2,930 kg (6,019–6,460 lb)

Chronology
- Predecessor: Hongqi CA72
- Successor: Hongqi CA7225LH

The Hongqi CA770 is a limousine produced by FAW Hongqi as the successor to the Hongqi CA72. The CA770 remained in production from 1966 until 1981 albeit in limited numbers. Built on a platform derived from the Chrysler Imperial, around 1,600 of these V8-engined Hongqis were built in total (plus just shy of 300 of the short wheelbase CA773). Over the years, various additional versions were released, including a 1965 long-wheelbase model with three rows of seats and a 1969 armored version (CA772). A pickup truck version was also produced, with three built. A funeral hearse version was planned, but never produced. The 770 series was powered by a locally made 5.7-liter V8 engine, while the bodywork was penned in house by First Auto Works.

== History ==
The design was a modernized version of the previous CA72, including original motifs such as the hand fan-shaped grille and chromed ribs flanking the rear licanse plate. The chromed characters spelling out "红旗" (Hongqi) were in Mao Zedong's own handwriting.

Several modernized modifications of these cars continued to be built in limited numbers until the mid-1990s.

In 1989, Hongqi would produce its first entirely new limousine model. It was named the "CA7225LH" and was based on the Chinese version of the Audi 100 C3 sedan. In 2009, the Hongqi HQE limousine was produced, which was retro-styled after the Hongqi CA770. This was later developed into the Hongqi L5.

== Models ==
- CA770C: Right-hand drive version of the CA770G. Like the CA770G, the interior and engine were from the first-generation Lincoln Town Car. One example was built in 1987.
- CA770G: CA770 with 5.8 L Ford (351 ci) engine, Lincoln Town Car steering wheel and tachometer. 25 were built from 1985 to 1988.
- CA770J: Convertible based on the full-length CA770 chassis. Mainly used in parades, the rear seats were raised so that the passengers could stand with the top down. Five were built from 1965 to 1972. One example, the CA770JG, featured a large glass panel to protect the passengers.
- CA770TJ: Landaulet version. Two examples were built in 1984 for the 35th anniversary of the founding of the People's Republic of China.
- CA770L: Combi version. Three were built.
- CA770JH: Ambulance version. The basic shape was retained, but the trunk lid was raised (which also raised the rear window) to allow easier access for a stretcher. Three were built.
- CA771: Short wheelbase version. It featured two rows of seats (instead of three) and was 650 mm (26 in) shorter. A total of 127 (or 129) were built from 1967 to 1971.
- CA772: Armored version. The engine was bored out to 8.0L and tuned to 300 hp. The body featured 8 mm thick armor to with stand light machine gun fire. The windows were 65 mm thick bulletproof glass. 15 were built from 1969 to 1972; 12 remained in China, while the other three were exported (one to North Korea, another to Cambodia, and the third to Vietnam).
- CA772TJ: Landaulet version. Two examples were built in 1999 for the 50th anniversary of the founding of the People's Republic of China.
- CA773: Short wheelbase version, with a shorter rear overhang. It was 400 mm (15.7 in) shorter than the CA770 and featured two rows of seats. Unlike the CA771, the CA773 featured a window between the rear door and the D-pillar. A total of 297 were built from 1969 to 1976; other sources claim 291 examples between 1968 and 1980.
- CA7560: The last CA770-based model, CA7560LH is the long wheelbase model. Fitted with black, plastic wing mirrors of Audi origins. The earlier models had an interior similar to the original CA770, but with some interior parts from the Peugeot 504. The later models had much of the interior from the Audi 100/200. The engine was also from the CA770. 20 were built from 1992 to 1995.
- CA7400: Remake of the Hongqi CA770 with a lowered roofline based on the 1998–2011 Lincoln Town Car. One prototype was made in 2004.
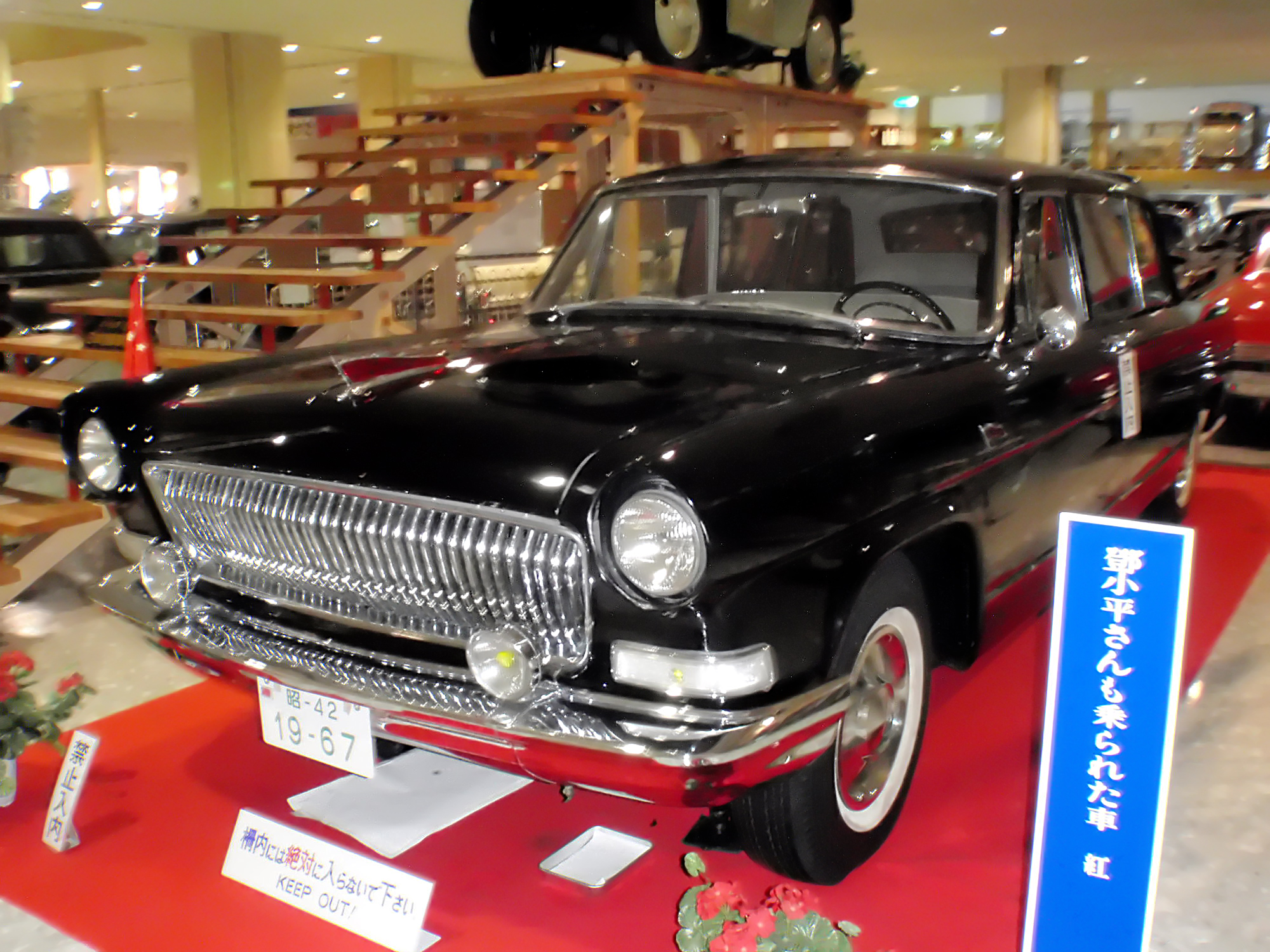
1967 Hongqi CA770

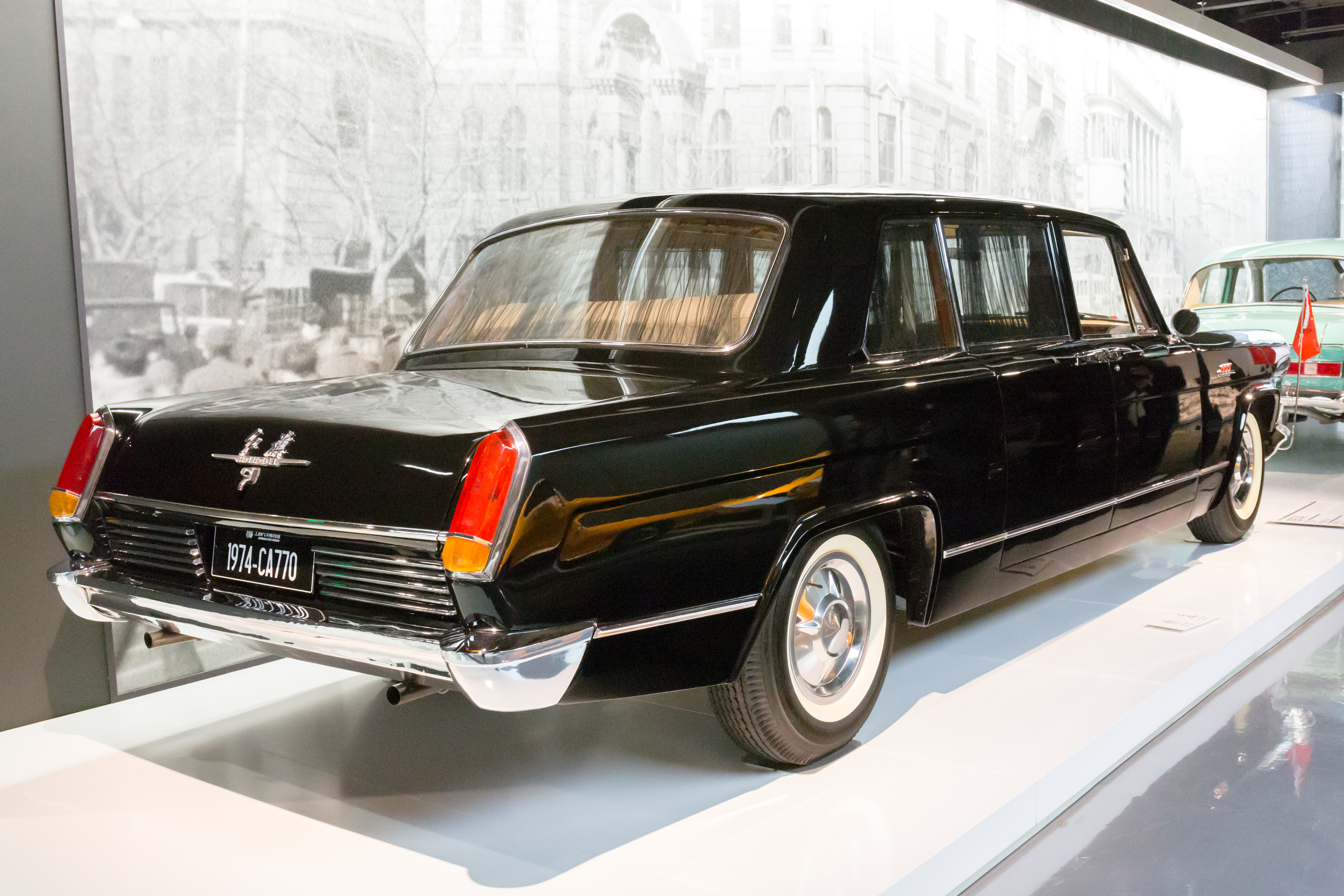
1974 Hongqi CA770 (rear view)

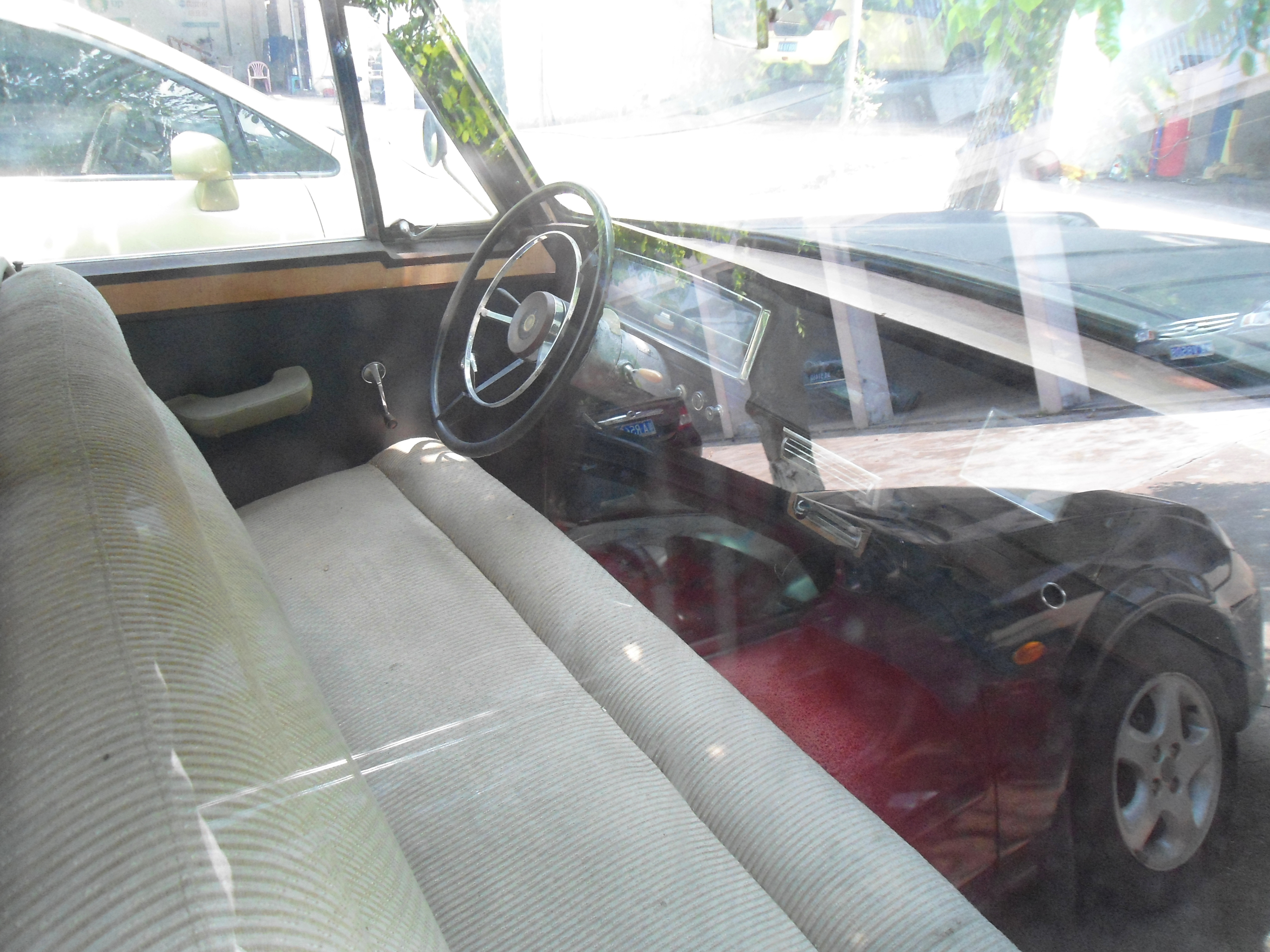
Hongqi CA770 interior (front seats)

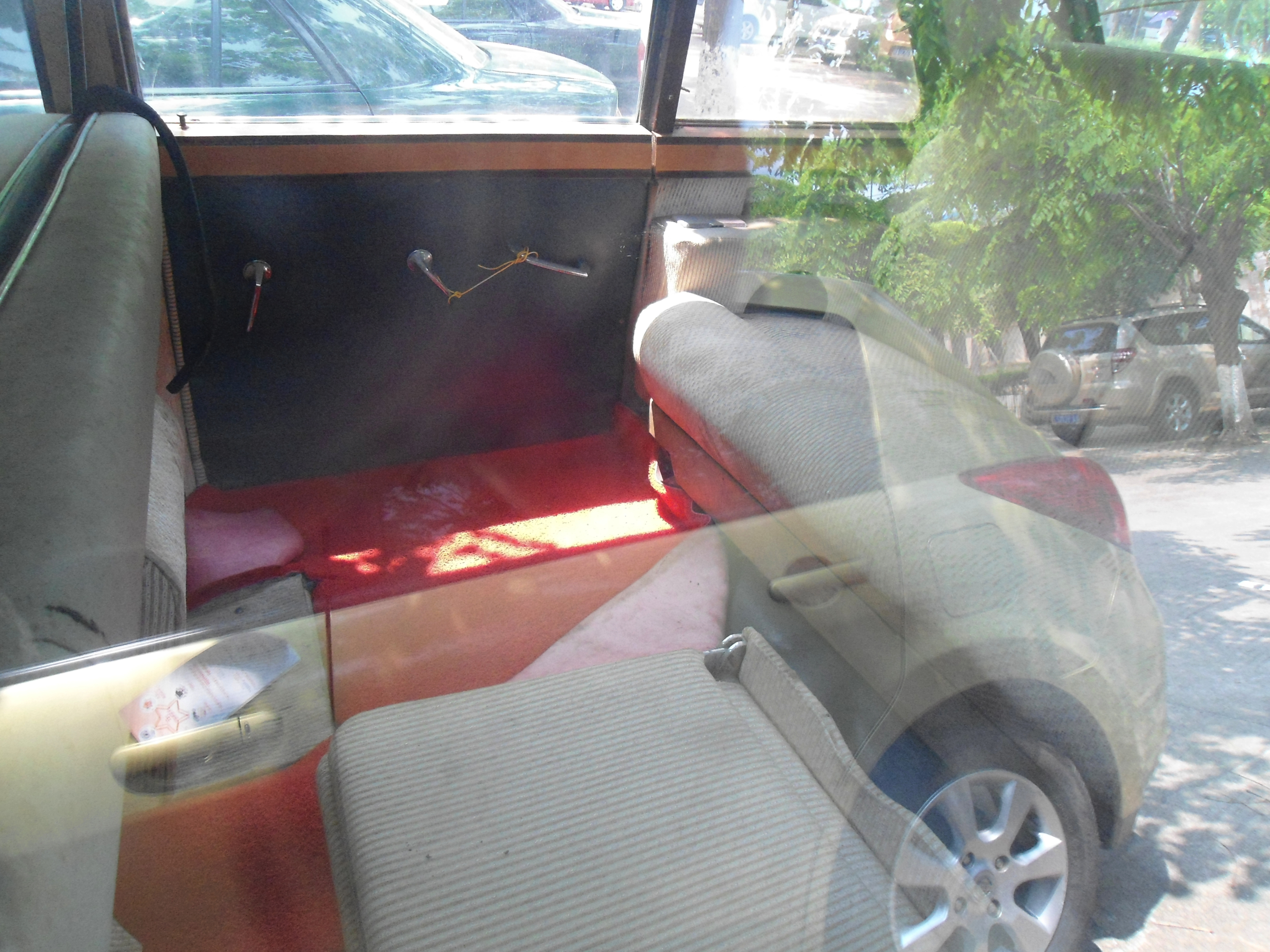
Hongqi CA770 interior (rear seats)

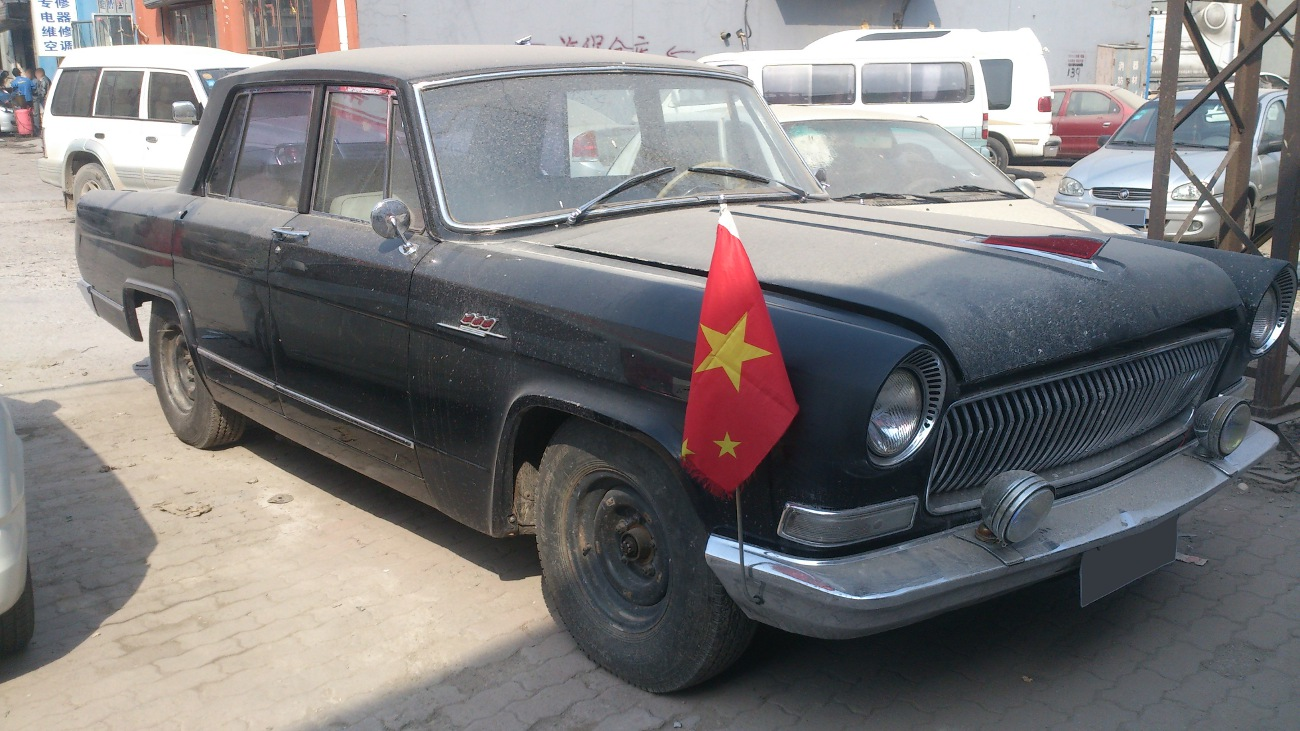
Hongqi CA771

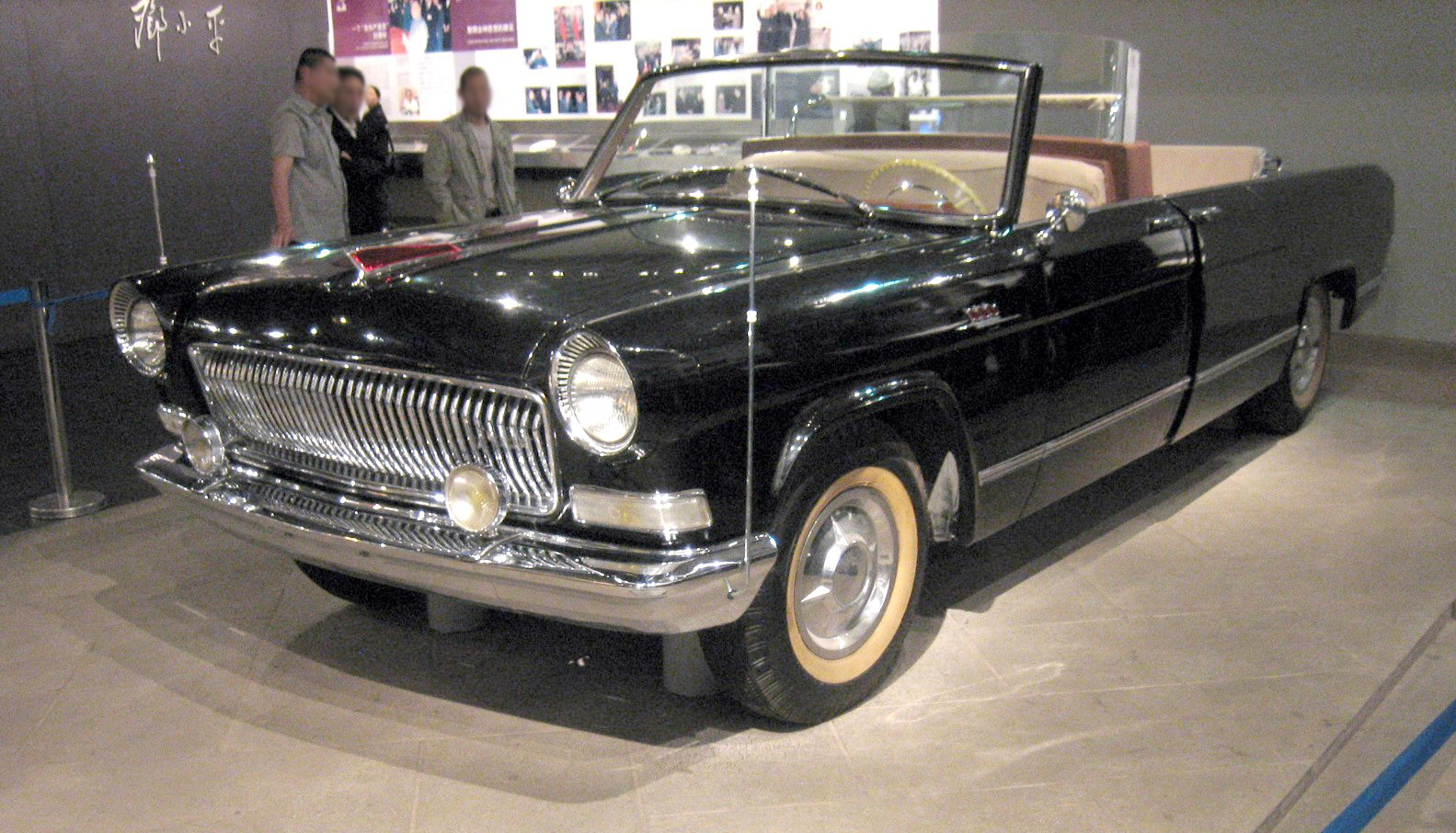
Hongqi Cabriolet
