= Hongqi HQE =

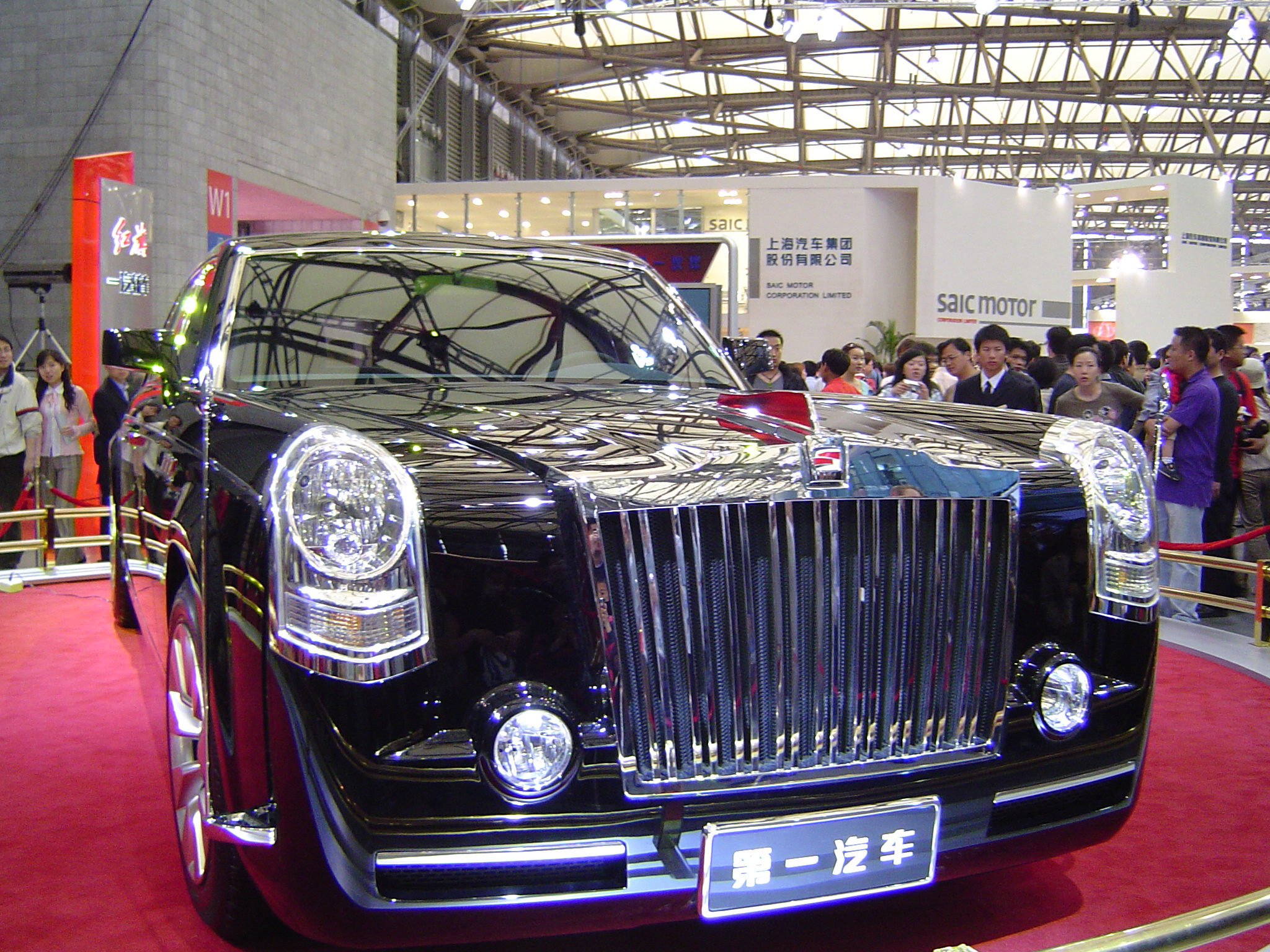

Overview
- Manufacturer: Hongqi
- Production: 2009–present

Body and chassis
- Class: Luxury car
- Layout: FR layout

Powertrain
- Engine: 6.0 L CA12VG V12 (petrol)

Chronology
- Successor: Hongqi L5

The Hongqi HQE (红旗HQE) is a large four-door limousine built by FAW Hongqi. Released in 2009, it is the first Chinese-built V12 cylinder engine-equipped luxury car. As Hongqi's most advanced top-of-the-line vehicle type, the HQE will serve as the high-end vehicle for VIPs and high-ranking national officials.

The HQE was later designated to CA7600J, the official vehicle of Chinese leader Hu Jintao for the People's Republic of China National Day 60th anniversary celebration. The production model of the HQE is called L7 (short wheel base) and L9 when the mass production began in 2013.

== Design ==
Based on the HQD concept car, the HQE is completely hand-built. The body comprises a rectangular section of galvanized steel with square edged exterior panels mounted on a Toyota Land Cruiser Prado-derived chassis, and the outward appearance and detailing contains aspects of Chinese styling. Dimensionally it is 6.4 meters long, 2.05 meters wide, and 1.72 meters high. The HQE is priced at over 3,000,000 RMB or approximately US$439,300 (as of 2009). An armored version of the car is also available. The Hongqi was designed at the FAW R&D facility in Changchun. The design team was staffed jointly by FAW and Magna Steyr, and contained members from China, Austria, the United Kingdom and the United States.

=== CA7600J ===
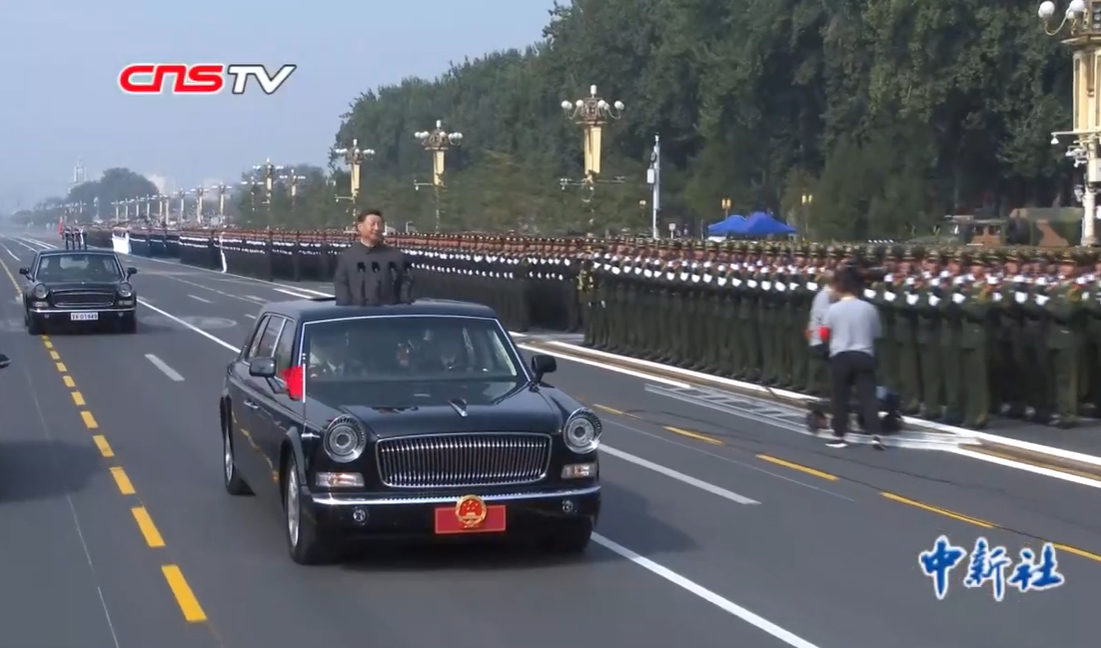
Hongqi CA7600J

Due to the controversy surrounding the HQD concept car and political considerations, the design of the HQE parade car, which was later named as CA7600J, opted for a close resemblance to the Hongqi CA770. As a result, the CA7600J parade car ultimately became a hybrid vehicle with the body of the HQD and the front of the CA770. The overall vehicle features a high front and low rear ship-like body posture, with chrome accents running through the waistline and skirt line from front to back. Elements such as the vertical grille, forward-leaning Hongqi emblem on the grille, and three-sided Hongqi side emblem from the classic Hongqi vehicle have been retained. The sunflower emblem in the center of the steering wheel also appears in the middle of the four wheel hubs, symbolizing the sun and representing the leadership of the Chinese Communist Party. The wheel spokes are designed to radiate like the sun, and the external rearview mirrors resemble fluttering flags.

=== L5, L7 and L9 ===
After the 2009 military parade, FAW made improvements to the CA7600J and derived three models based on dimensions, primarily the wheelbase and length—namely, L5, L7, and L9. Among these, the Hongqi L5 is publicly available for sale, while the L7 and L9 are temporarily reserved for national diplomatic activities.

== Performance ==
The HQE is powered by an independently researched and developed aluminum V12 cylinder engine of Chinese design (designation CA12VG), with a displacement of 6.0 liters and producing 300 kW (400 hp) at 5600 rpm and 550 Nm (405 lb·ft) of torque at 4400 rpm.
