= Hongqi Guoli =

Full-size luxury sedan

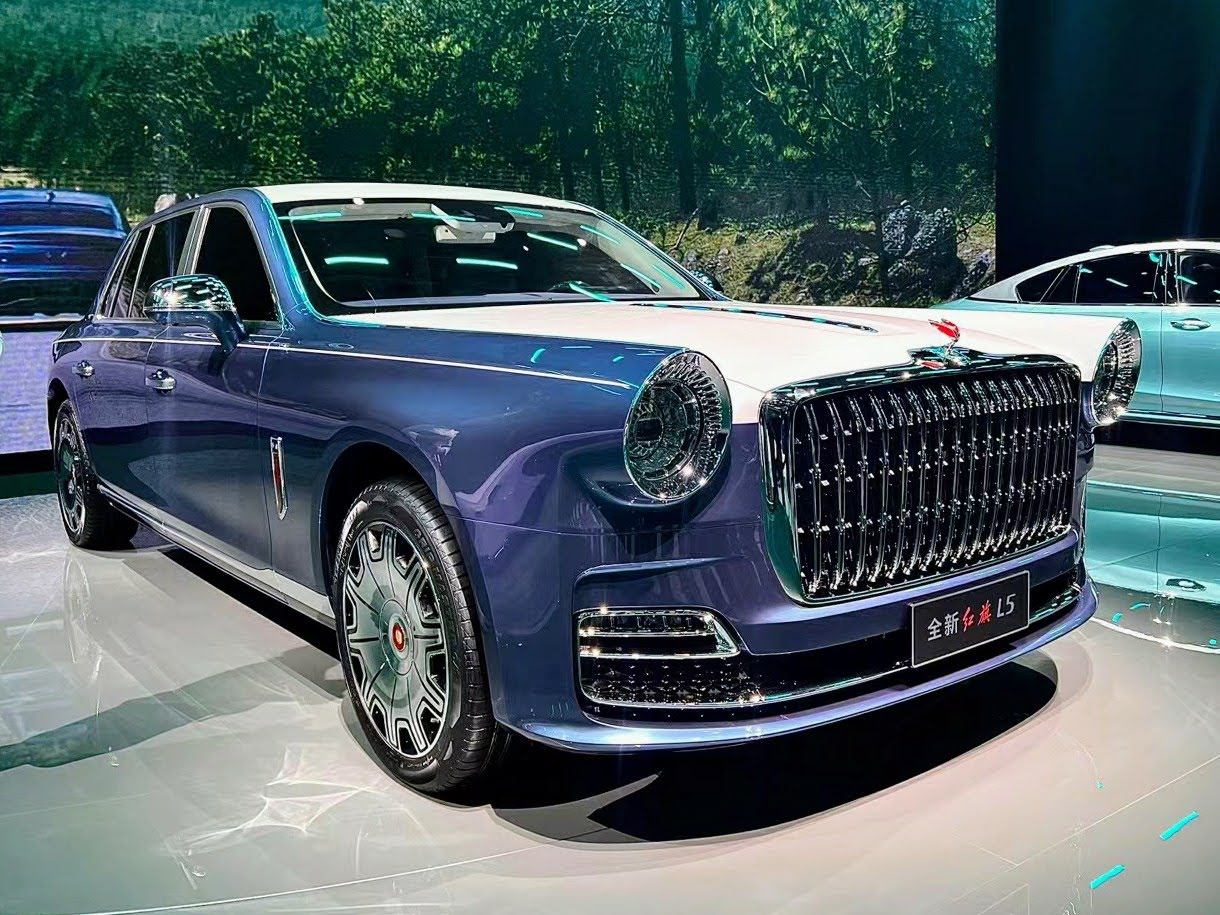

Overview
- Manufacturer: Hongqi (FAW Group)
- Also called: Hongqi L5 (2014—2023)
- Production: 2014–present

Body and chassis
- Class: Full-size luxury car (F); Ultra-luxury car
- Body style: 4-door sedan

Chronology
- Predecessor: Hongqi CA770

The Hongqi Guoli (Chinese: 红旗国礼), formerly and also known as the Hongqi L5, is a large neo-retro full-size luxury sedan produced by Chinese automobile manufacturer Hongqi, a subsidiary of FAW Group since 2014, whose design was inspired by the discontinued Hongqi CA770. The Guoli serves as Hongqi's current flagship vehicle for the Chinese automotive market.

== Hongqi L5 (2014–2022) ==
Hongqi L5
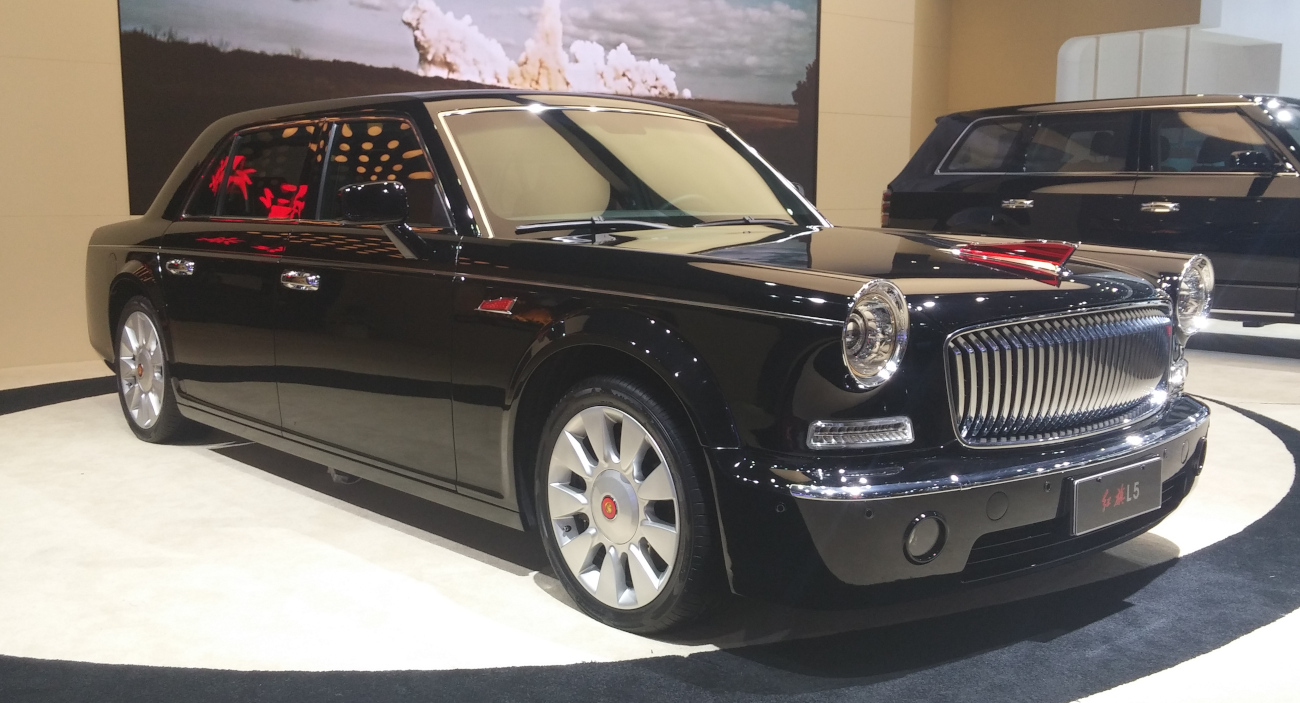

Overview
- Production: 2014–2022
- Assembly: China: Changchun, Jilin
- Designer: Xiu Yi

Body and chassis
- Layout: Longitudinal Front-engine, four-wheel-drive
- Related: Hongqi HQE; Hongqi N501

Powertrain
- Engine: 4.0 L V8 twin-turbo (petrol) (CA7400); 6.0 L CA12GV60-01 V12 (petrol) (CA7600)
- Transmission: 6-speed TB-68 automatic (CA7600); 8-speed automatic (CA7400)

Dimensions
- Wheelbase: 3,435 mm (135.2 in)
- Length: 5,555 mm (218.7 in)
- Width: 2,018 mm (79.4 in)
- Height: 1,578 mm (62.1 in)
- Curb weight: 3,150 kg (6,945 lb)

Chronology
- Predecessor: Hongqi CA770

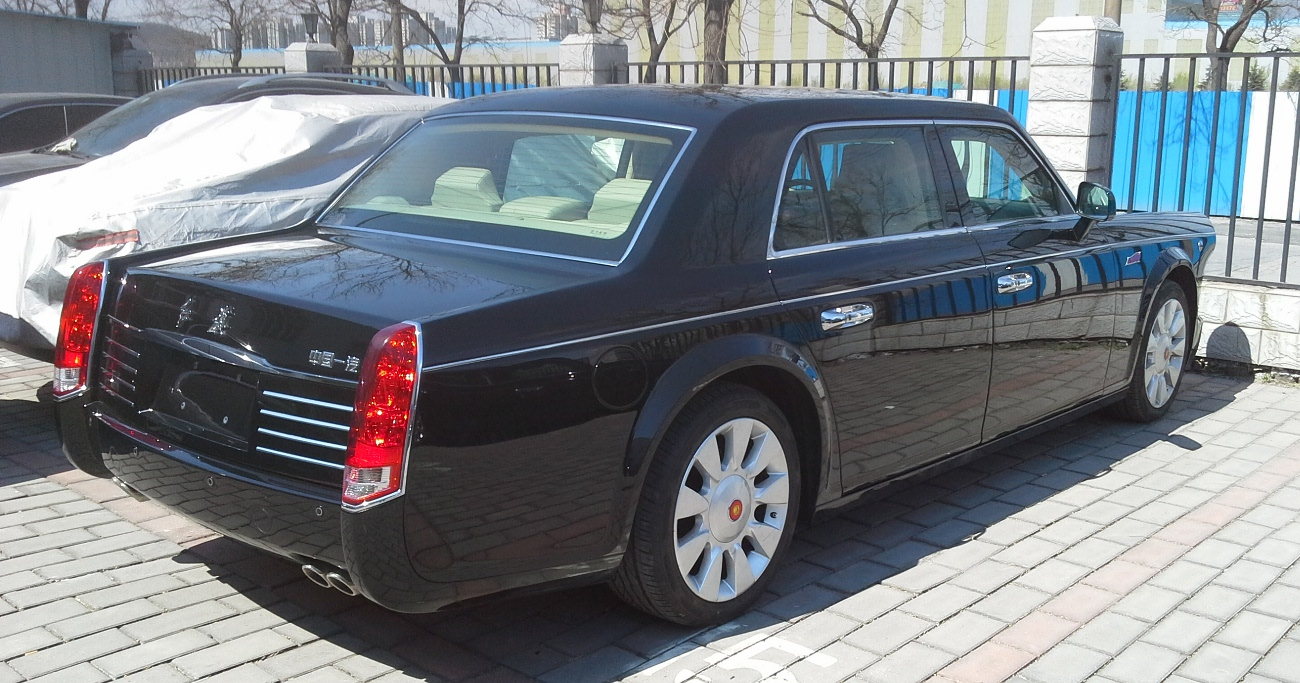
Rear view

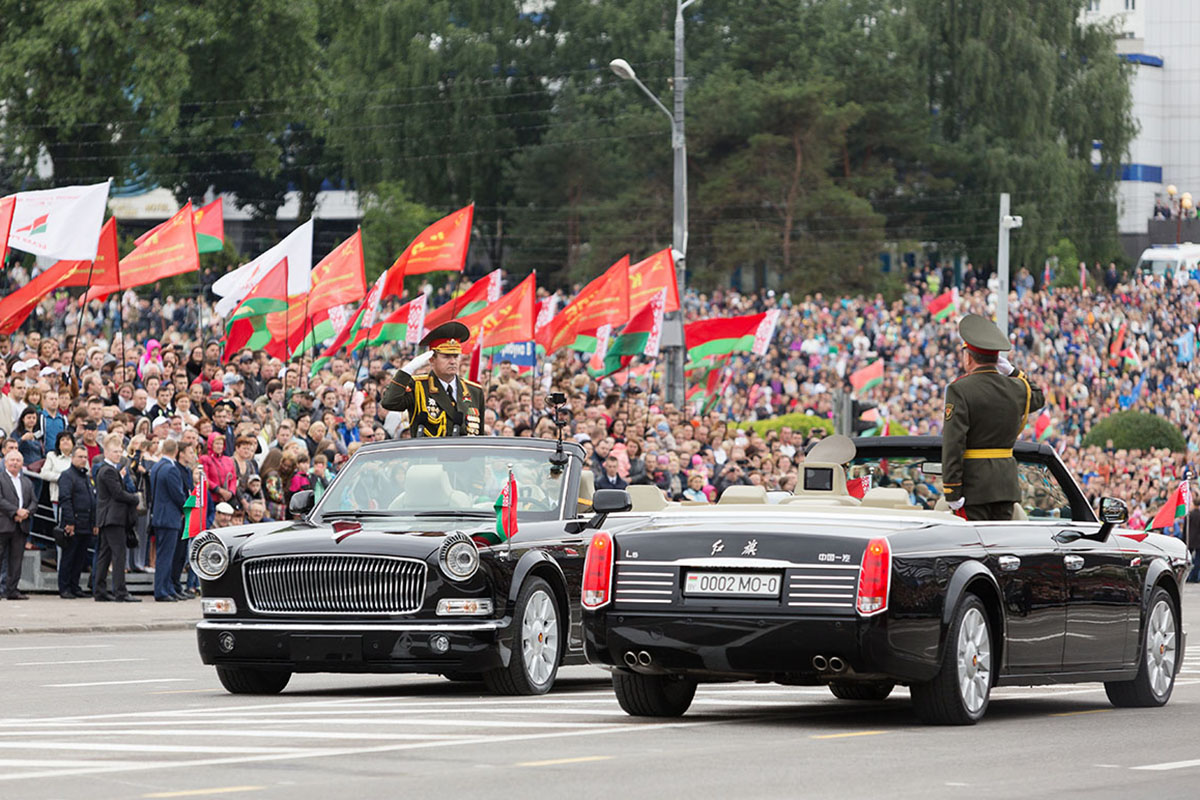
The Open-Top Edition Hongqi L5 during a parade in Minsk in 2017

Released in 2013 at the Shanghai Auto Show, the L5 is renowned for currently being the most expensive Chinese-made car ever available for purchase, at CN¥5 million Renminbi (US$800,000 UK£580,000). It is the official state car of China, as it is used by Chinese leader Xi Jinping. The sedan is currently offered only in China.

A handful of first generation L5s have been exported to Belarus via donations, where they are used by the Belarusian military as a parade car, first being debuted at the 2015 Minsk Victory Day Parade.

In 2016 Hongqi announced a V8 version of the L5, powered by a 4-litre twin-turbo V8 producing 381 horsepower (284 kW; 386 PS) with an eight-speed automatic. The 6-litre V12 model is designated as CA7600 and the V8 version as CA7400. The CA7400 was released in 2017.

The L5 has three variants: the civilian, official state car and parade car. It has a length of 5.555m, five being a lucky number in Chinese culture.

== Hongqi Guoli (2023–present) ==
Hongqi Guoli
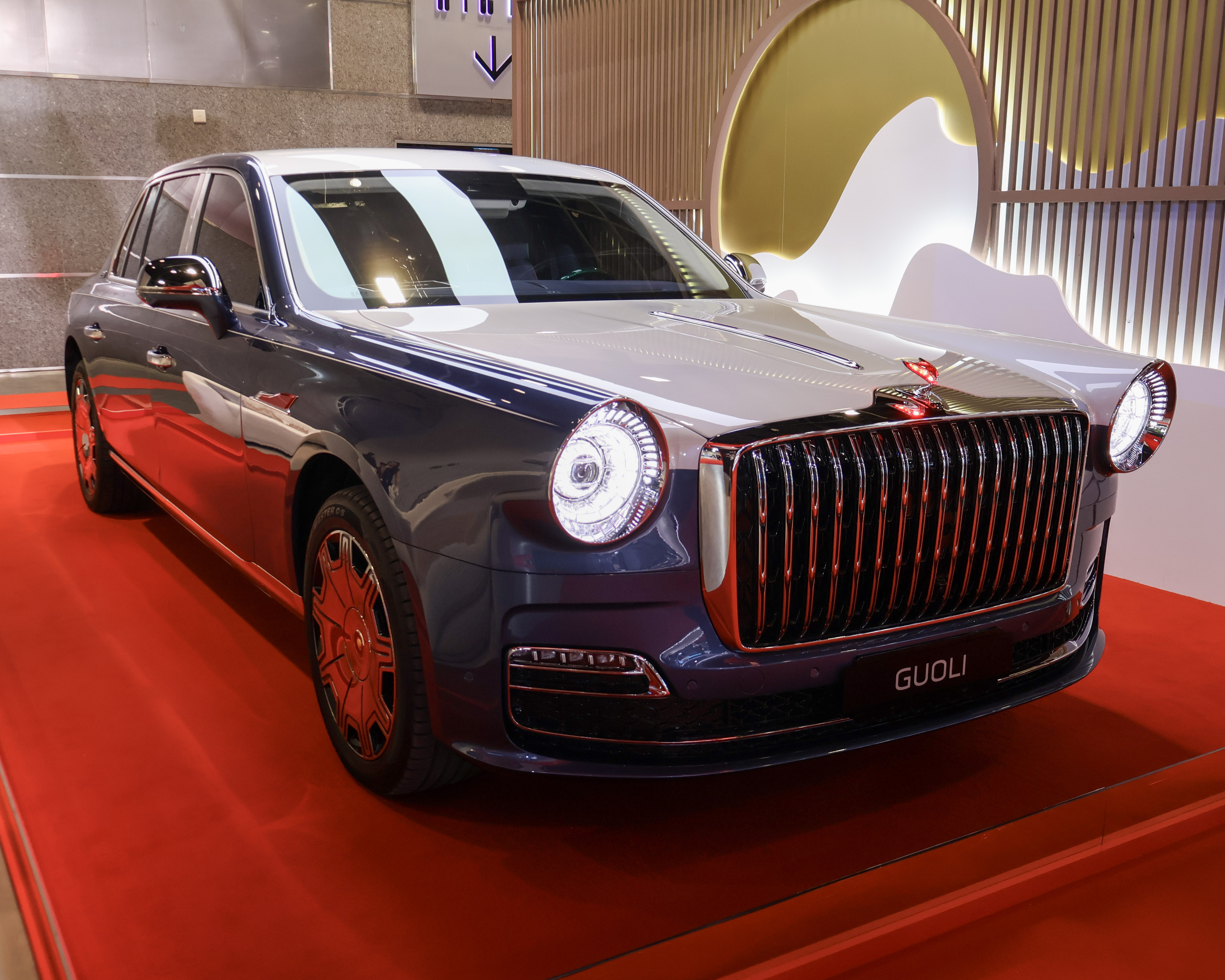

Overview
- Production: 2023–present
- Assembly: China: Changchun, Jilin
- Designer: Giles Taylor

Body and chassis
- Layout: Front-engine, four-wheel-drive
- Related: Hongqi N701

Powertrain
- Engine: 4.0 L CA8GV40T-03 V8 turbo (petrol)

Dimensions
- Wheelbase: 3,730 mm (146.9 in)
- Length: 5,980 mm (235.4 in)
- Width: 2,090 mm (82.3 in)
- Height: 1,710 mm (67.3 in)
- Curb weight: 3,150 kg (6,945 lb)

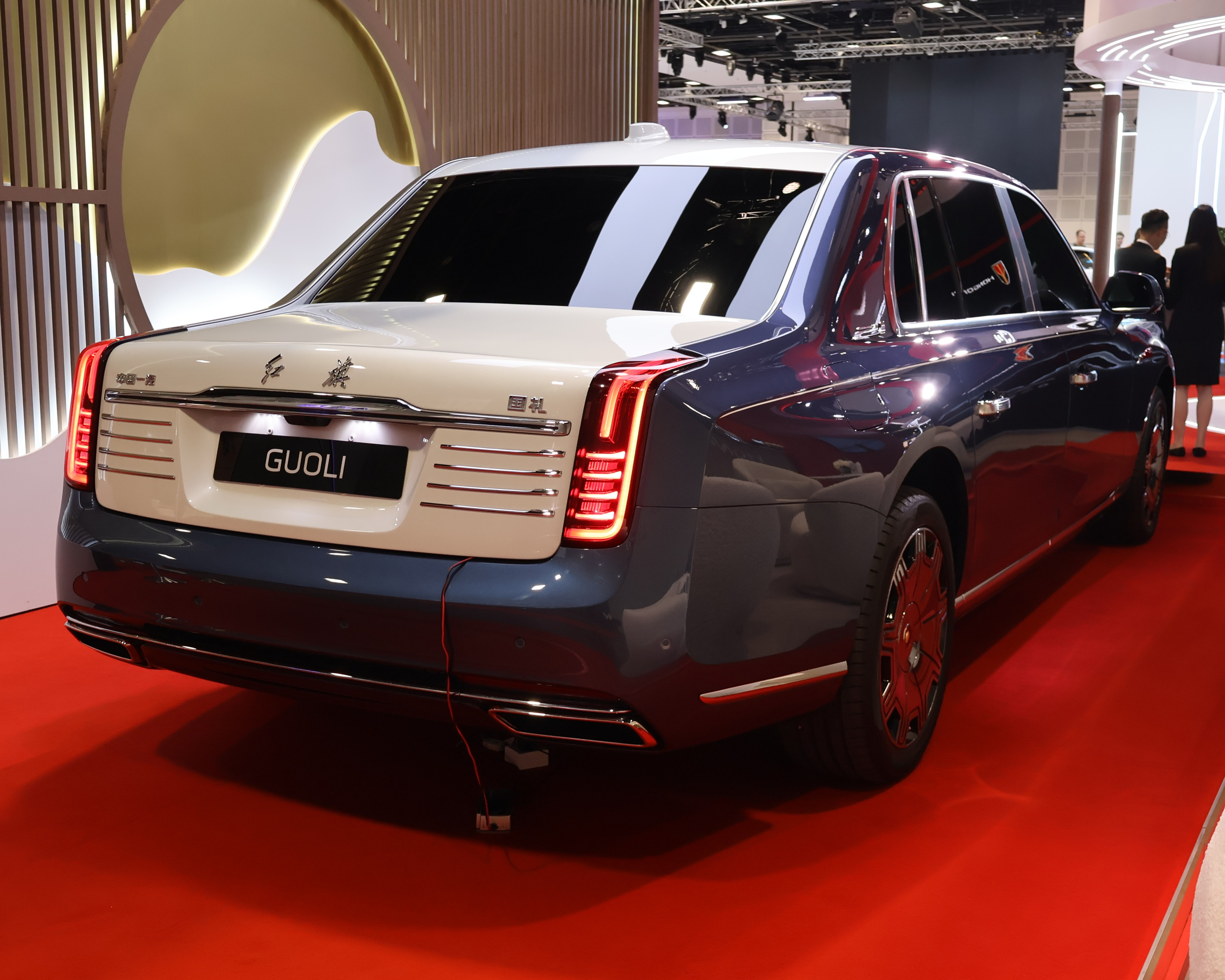
Rear view

In April 2023, the second generation Hongqi L5 was revealed on the Auto Shanghai 2023.

The Guoli features a dual-color body design, measures 5980/2090/1710mm in dimension, with a wheelbase of 3730mm, which is significantly larger than the previous generation. It is equipped with a V8 4.0-liter turbocharged engine that delivers a maximum power of 285 kW (382 hp; 387 PS).

In November 2023, the Hongqi officially announced on Weibo that the car would be delivered in 2024.

In April 2024, the second generation L5 was renamed as Hongqi Guoli (红旗国礼) for Chinese Market.

The Guoli pricing was announced in June 2024, at 7,180,000 RMB.

== Sales ==
Year	China
2024	18
2025	54
