= Hongqi CA72 =

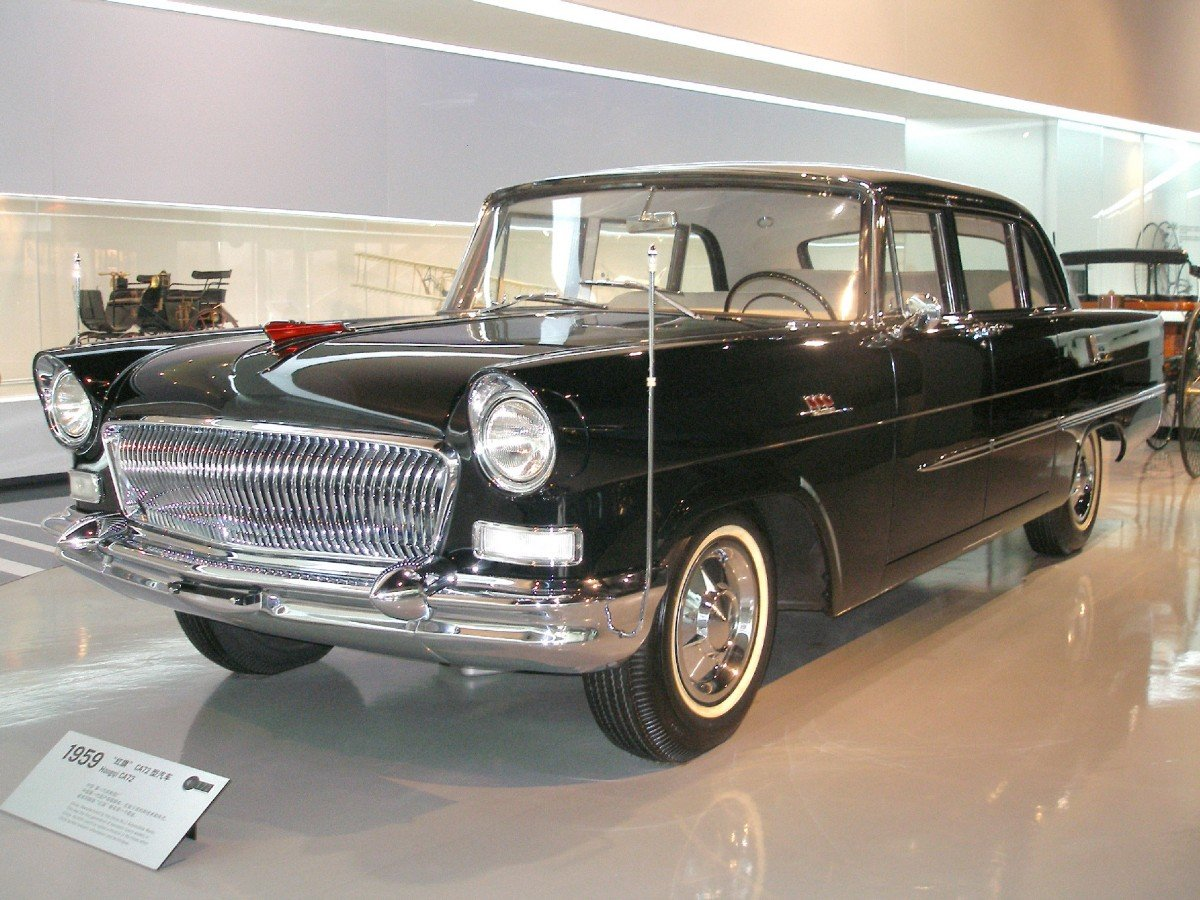

Overview
- Manufacturer: Hongqi (FAW)
- Production: 1958–1965 (possibly 1967)
- Assembly: China: Changchun

Body and chassis
- Class: Luxury car Full-size (F); Convertible
- Layout: FR layout

Powertrain
- Engine: 5655 cc V8
- Transmission: 2 or 4-speed automatic

Dimensions
- Wheelbase: 3,400 mm (133.9 in)
- Length: 5,730–5,740 mm (225.6–226.0 in)
- Width: 2,000–2,010 mm (78.7–79.1 in)
- Height: 1,670 mm (65.7 in)
- Curb weight: 2,000–2,800 kg (4,409–6,173 lb)

Chronology
- Successor: Hongqi CA770

The Hongqi CA72 is an automobile produced by FAW Hongqi. It was the company's first production automobile and the first representative sedan that was constructed and built in China. Produced from 1959 until 1965, the CA72 was only available to state institutions and the leadership of the Chinese Communist Party and was regularly used in public events until the 1970s. Numerous details about technology and production are unclear, but reportedly 202 examples of the CA72 were built before it was replaced by the modernized CA770.

== History ==
The Hongqi CA72 was developed by First Automotive Works (FAW) based in Changchun, which was founded in 1953 with technical and financial support from the Soviet Union. FAW originally primarily produced commercial vehicles, in particular heavy trucks based on Soviet models under the Jiefang brand. In 1958, the Great Leap Forward began in China, aimed at eliminating China's industrial gap to the western industrialized countries. The effects of this initiative were also felt in the automotive sector. From 1958, several Chinese plants began constructing passenger cars for civilian use: however, because China did not have a homegrown auto industry, most of the new automotive development was based on Western models, imported in small numbers: while outright copying was prohibited, most of the vehicles in this period differed far more from Western vehicles in looks than technology, where foreign platforms were often taken and completely duplicated. One of the first cars was the FAW-developed middle-class sedan Dongfeng CA71, which was basically a replica of the French Simca Vedette with a Mercedes-Benz six-cylinder engine. During this time, FAW also began to develop representative vehicles for the top politicians. The initiative for this was said to have come from the party leader Mao Zedong himself, who had expressed the wish in 1955, at the Chinese Communist Party congress, to replace Soviet limousines driving in with a car from national production.

In August 1958, the first prototype of a saloon was completed. FAW gave the car the model name Hongqi, referring to the revolutionary symbol of the Red Flag. Due to the short timeframe given by the government aiming for a 1959 production deadline, this was actually not a fully FAW built prototype, but a reskinned Chrysler Imperial, having gotten access to an imported 1955 example in Jilin, FAW's hometown.

The first prototype in the dimensions and in the basic technical structures already corresponded to the later production model. In the body area, however, there were significant differences. The prototype had a wide chrome strip on the sides of the car. Above the rear wheels was a large air intake, the edge of which was also chrome plated. The hand fan-shaped grille was very narrow at the bottom and opened far up, which had cultural significance in China from the Chinese character for "fan" (扇). These elements accounted for the production version. In automotive literature, the prototype is described as unattractive and coarse. In the following six months, six other prototypes were created, including two four-door convertibles, all of which differed in details from each other and from the later production version.

In 1959, FAW finally began mass production of the now called Hongqi CA72 sedan, which lasted until 1965 or 1967 depending on the source. Despite its Mopar roots, its styling was based on the Soviet ZIL-111 limousine. Until 1962, the CA72 competed with the Beijing Automobile Works produced sedan Beijing CB4, which looked more modern (although also based on an American full-size sedan - the CB4 was modeled after the 1950s Buick Special), but ultimately could not prevail. Unlike the CB4, the Hongqi CA72 has been technically improved over the years in details. This affected, among other things, the brakes, which were too weak in the first vehicles. From 1965, the Hongqi was referred to as CA770. Externally and technically, the CA770 was largely identical to the CA72, including the 1950s Mopar mechanicals which would remain until the end of CA770 production in 1981.

== Gallery ==
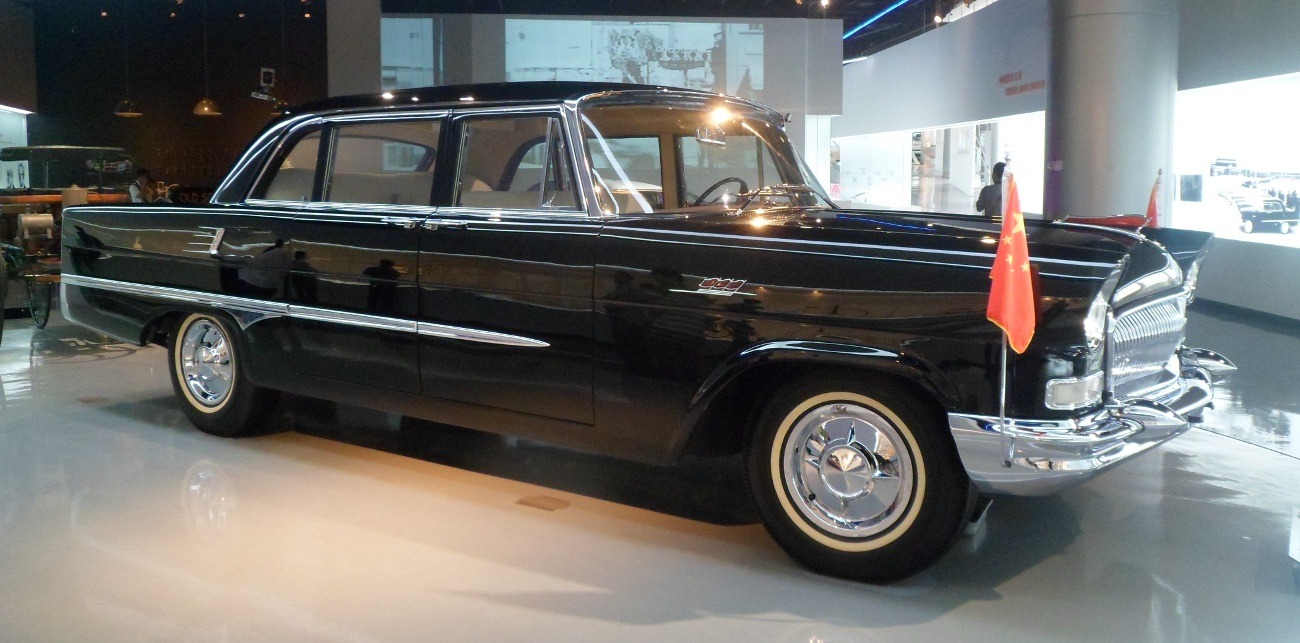
A 1959 Hongqi CA72 in Shanghai Automobile Museum

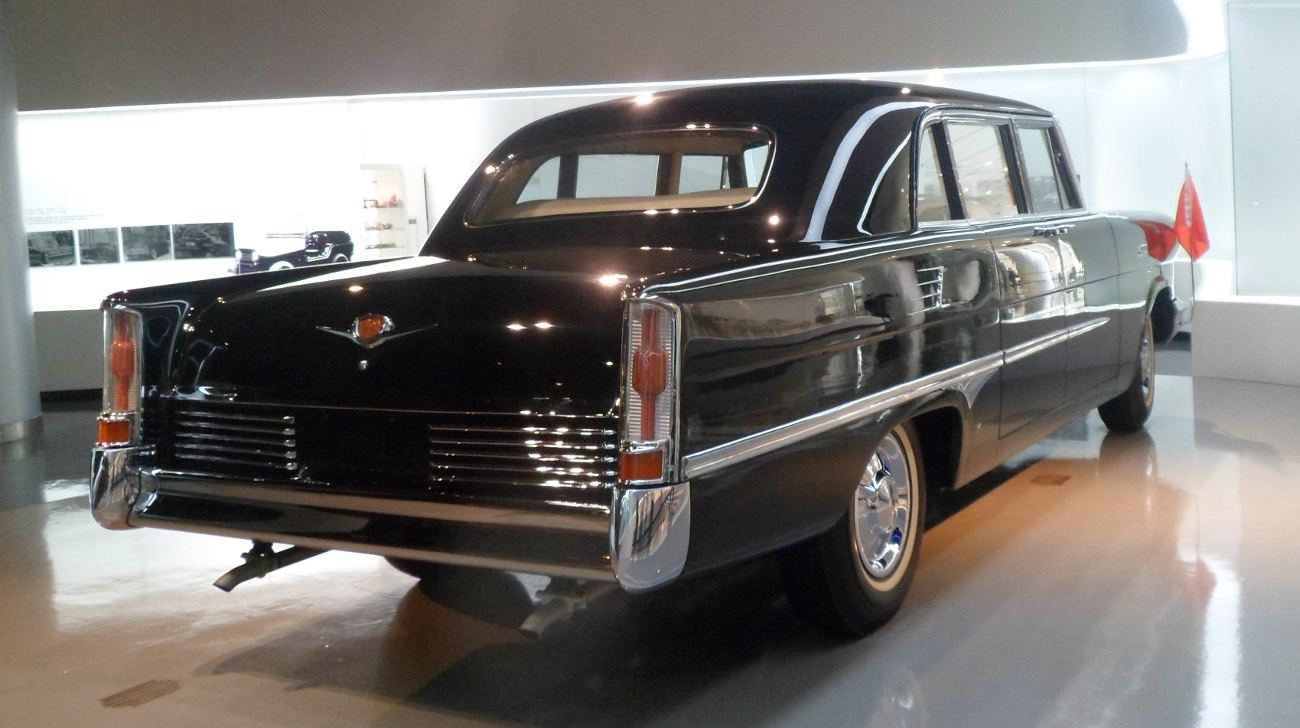
Hongqi CA72 rear

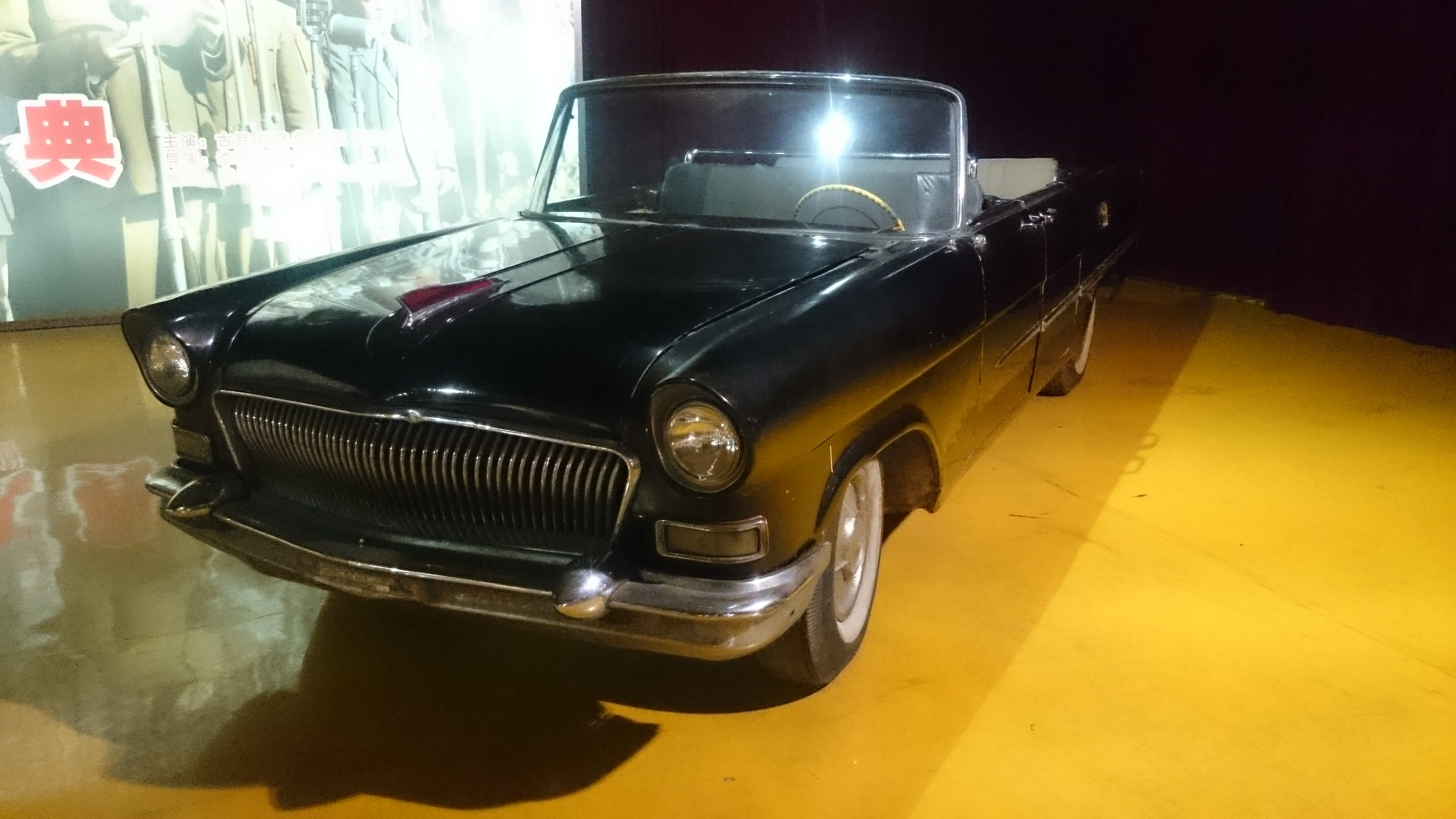
Hongqi CA72 Convertible
