= Bestune B90 =

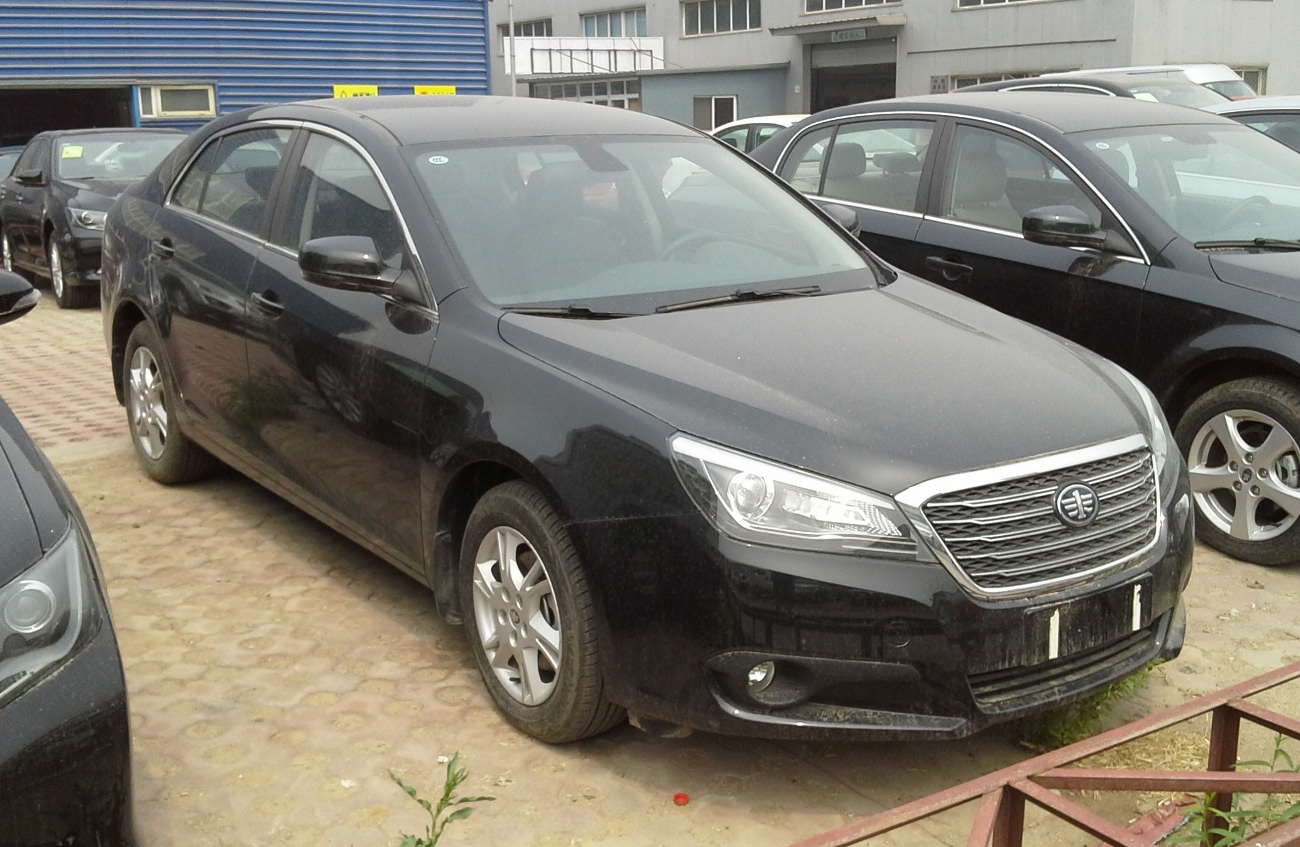

Overview
- Manufacturer: FAW Group - Bestune
- Also called: Pyeonghwa Hwiparam 2009 (North Korea)
- Production: 2012–2017
- Assembly: Changchun, China

Body and chassis
- Class: Executive car
- Body style: 4-door saloon
- Layout: Front engine, Front-wheel drive

Powertrain
- Engine: 1.8 L CA4GC18T turbo I4; 2.0 L CA4GC20T turbo I4; 2.0 L CA4GD1 I4; 2.3 L CA4GD3 I4
- Transmission: 6 speed manual 6 speed automatic

Dimensions
- Wheelbase: 2,780 mm (109.4 in)
- Length: 4,860 mm (191.3 in)
- Width: 1,812 mm (71.3 in)
- Height: 1,472 mm (58.0 in)

Chronology
- Successor: Hongqi H5; Bestune B70 III

The Bestune B90 (formerly Besturn B80) is an executive car produced by the Chinese car manufacturer Besturn.

== Overview ==
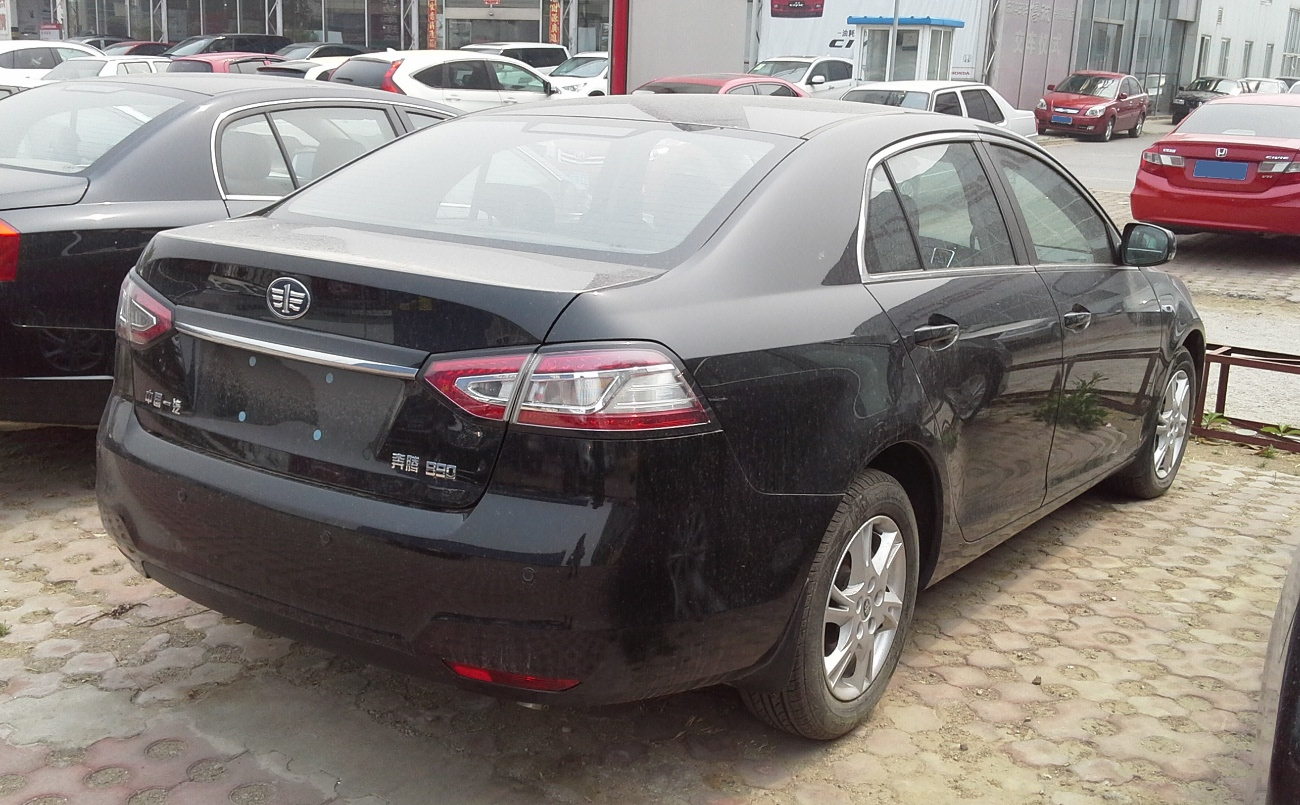
Besturn B90 rear view

The engine of the Besturn B90 was made by Mazda. It was unveiled at the Shanghai Motor Show in 2011 as a concept car, it later appeared at the Beijing Motor Show in 2012. Production of the sedan started on 16 July 2012, and delivery began on 22 August 2012. The Bestune B90 was originally available with either a 146 hp 2.0 liter inline-4 engine or a 160 hp 2.3 liter inline-4 engine. Both engines are Mazda-sourced. Hongqi badging is also available as a factory option for the Bestune B90.

In 2013, Pyeonghwa Motors licensed produce variant version of B90 under the name of Hwiparam 2009.

=== 2014 facelift ===
The B90 received a facelift in March 2014 swapping the engine options to a 180hp 1.8liter turbo inline-4 engine and a 204hp 2.0liter turbo inline-4 engine supplied by Volkswagen.

Production of the vehicle ended in 2017.
