= Hongqi E-QM5 =

Battery electric mid-size sedan

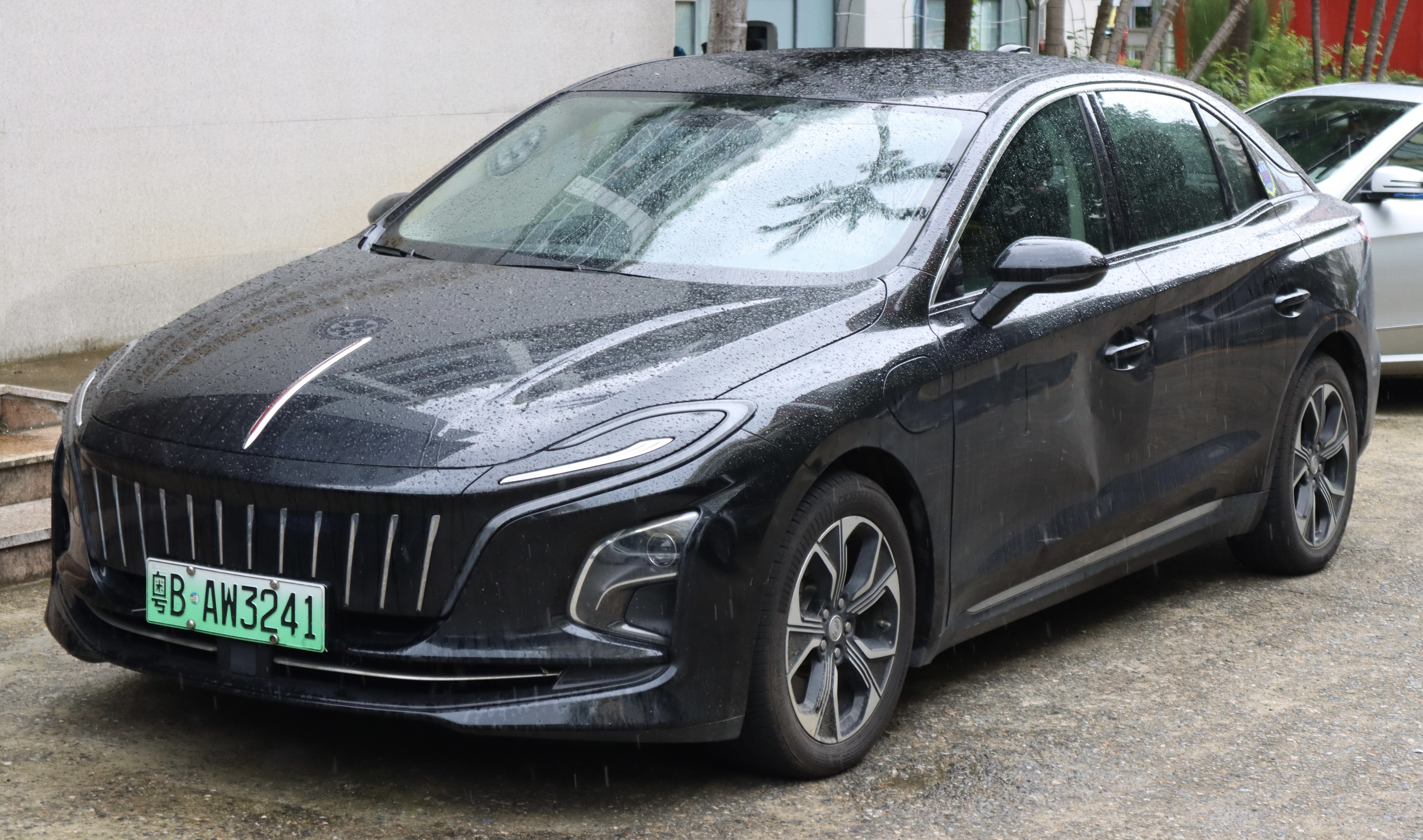

Overview
- Manufacturer: Hongqi (FAW Group)
- Model code: E111
- Production: 2021–present
- Assembly: China: Changchun, Jilin
- Designer: Giles Taylor

Body and chassis
- Class: Mid-size car (D)
- Body style: 4-door sedan
- Layout: Front-motor, front-wheel drive
- Related: Hongqi H5

Powertrain
- Electric motor: Permanent magnet synchronous
- Transmission: Single-speed gear reduction
- Battery: 55 kWh li-ion battery
- Electric range: 431 km (268 mi) (NEDC)

Dimensions
- Wheelbase: 2,990 mm (117.7 in)
- Length: 5,040 mm (198.4 in)
- Width: 1,910 mm (75.2 in)
- Height: 1,569 mm (61.8 in)

Chronology
- Predecessor: Hongqi H5 (first generation)

The Hongqi E-QM5 (Chinese: 红旗E-QM5) is a battery electric mid-size sedan produced by Chinese automobile manufacturer Hongqi, a subsidiary of FAW Group.

== Overview ==
The E-QM5 was first shown at the 2021 Haikou International New Energy Vehicle and Connected Mobility Show.

The E-QM5 shares the underpinnings of the Hongqi H5 gasoline-powered sedan with MacPherson struts at the front end and multi-link suspension at the rear, and dimensions of 5,040×1,910×1,569 mm (198.4×75.2×61.8 in), with a 2,990 mm (118 in) wheelbase.

=== Design ===
The exterior design was done under the lead by ex-Rolls-Royce design head Giles Taylor, who was hired by Hongqi since his departure from Rolls-Royce from 2019.

== Powertrain ==
The E-QM5 has a single electric motor that drives the front axle with 100 kW (134 hp; 136 PS), and NEDC-rated driving range of 431 kilometres (268 mi) supported by a 55 kWh lithium iron phosphate battery pack produced by FinDreams.

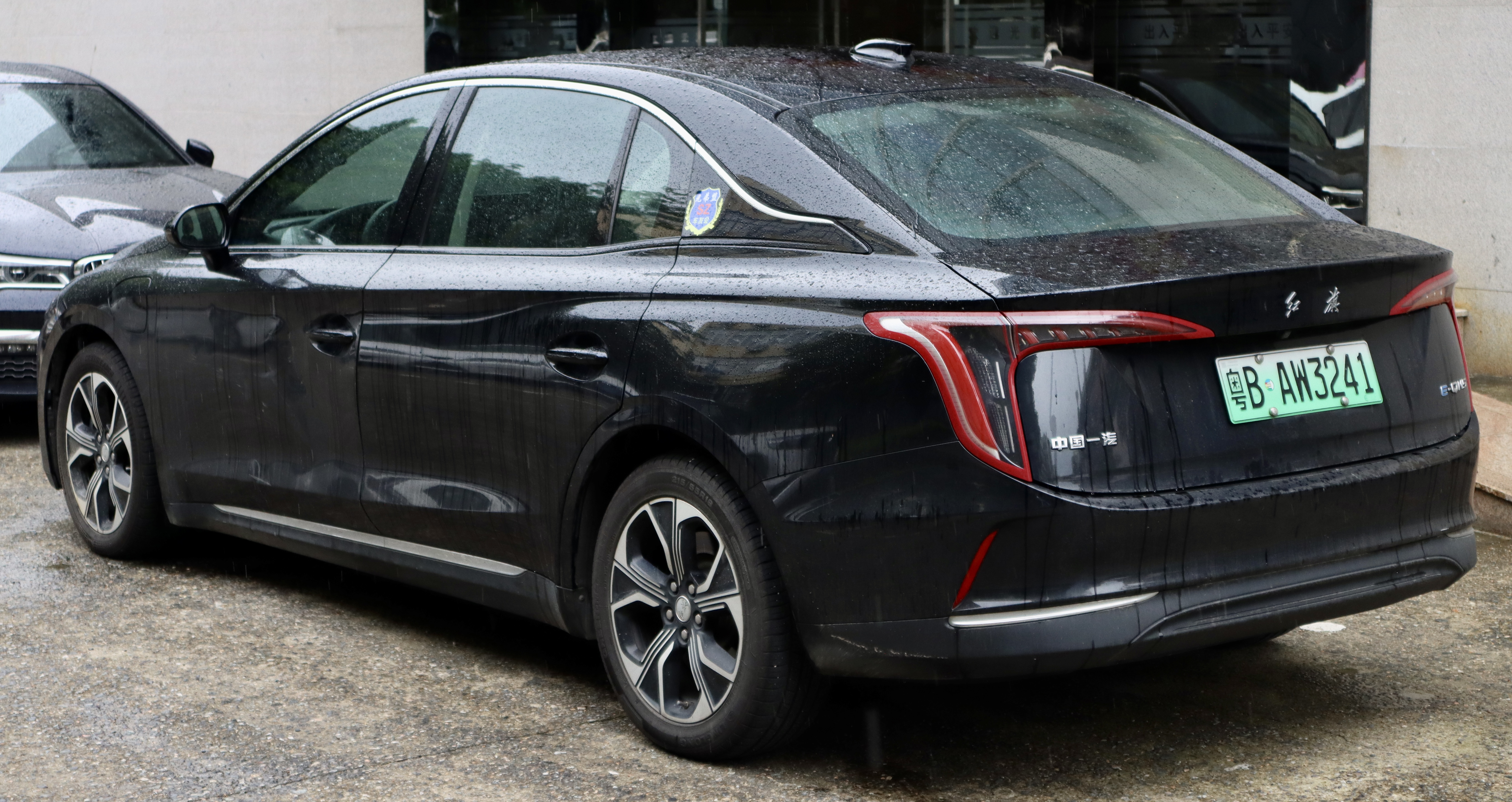
Rear view

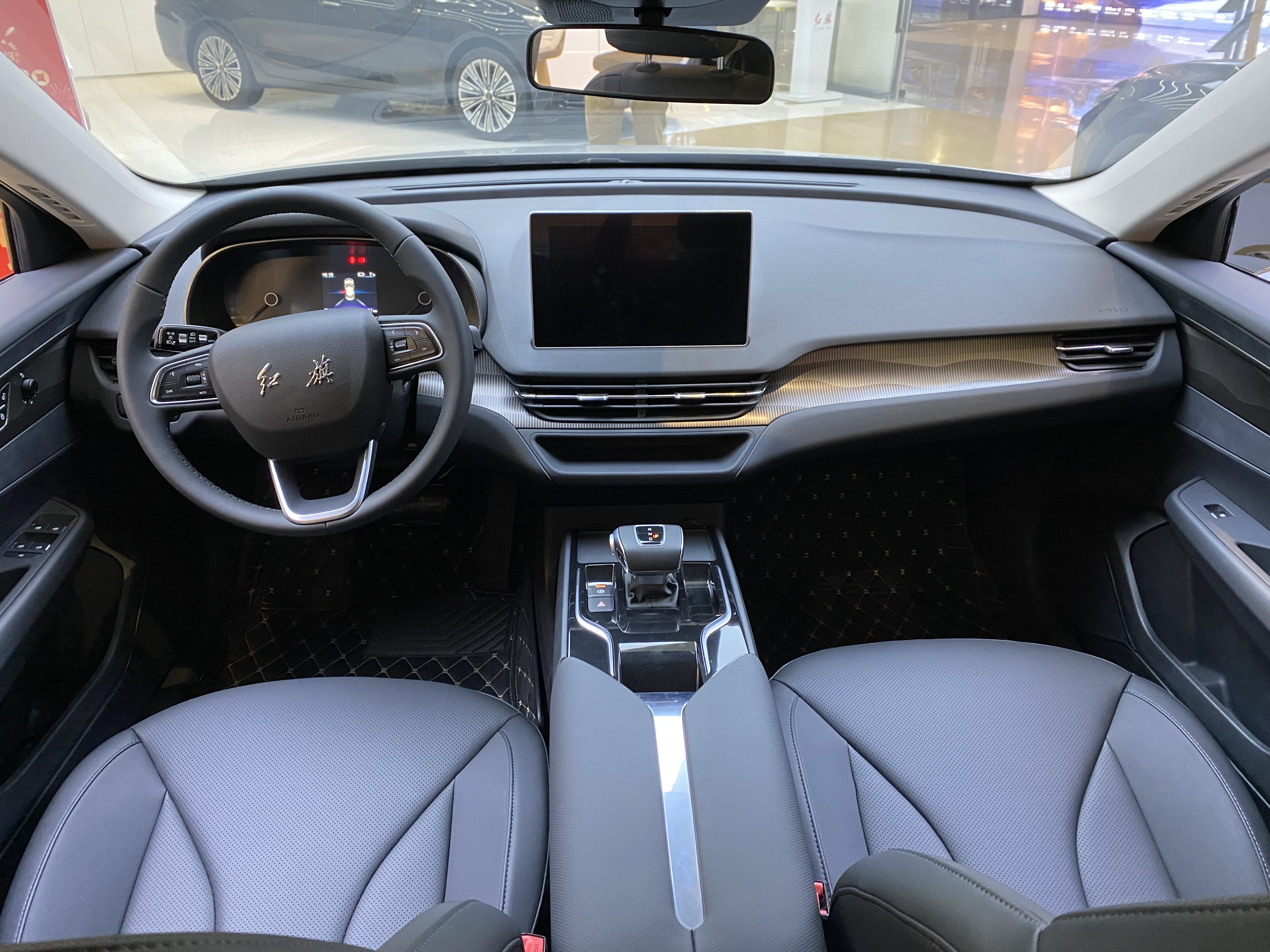
Interior

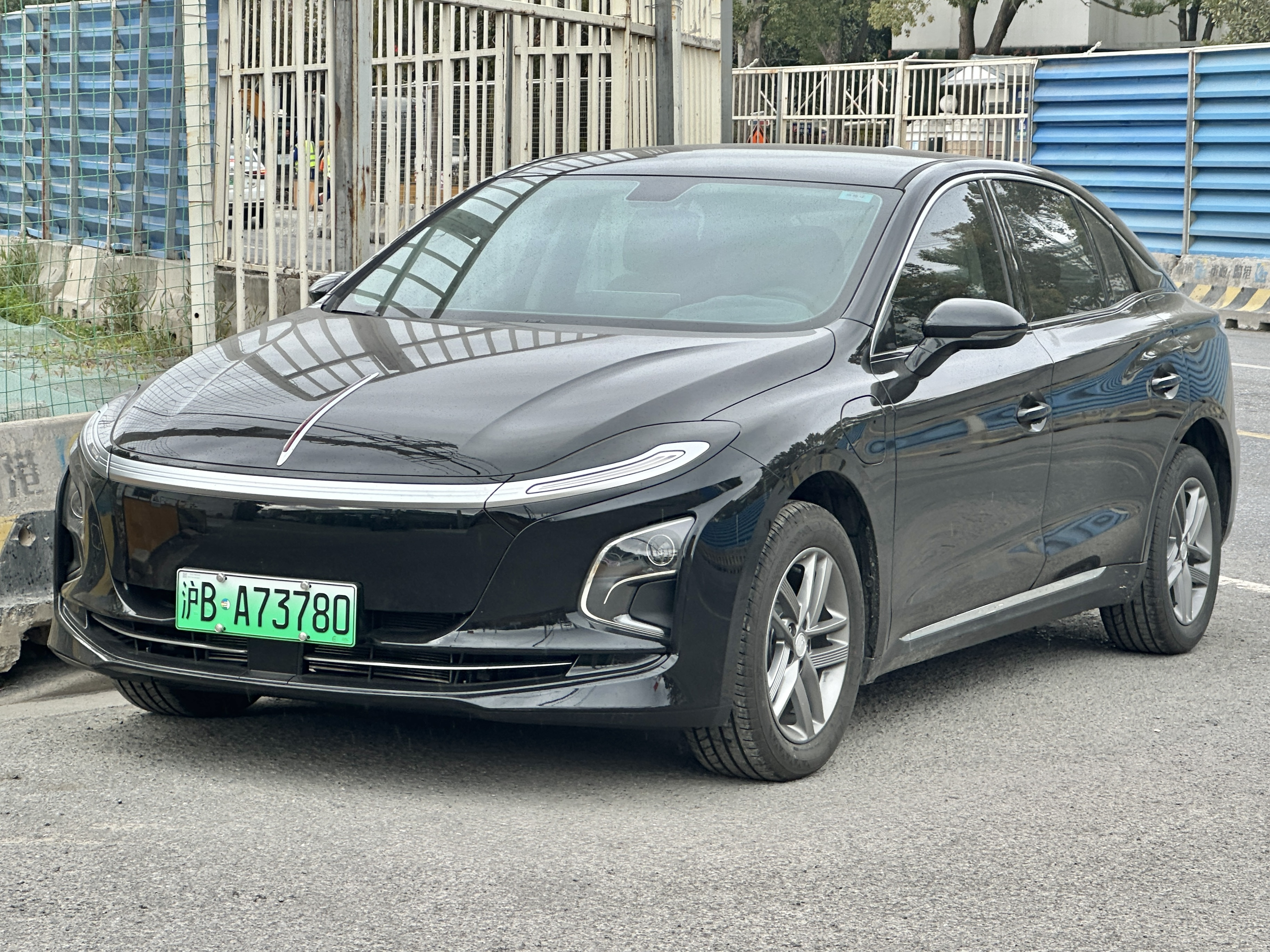
Hongqi E-QM5 2025 (facelift)

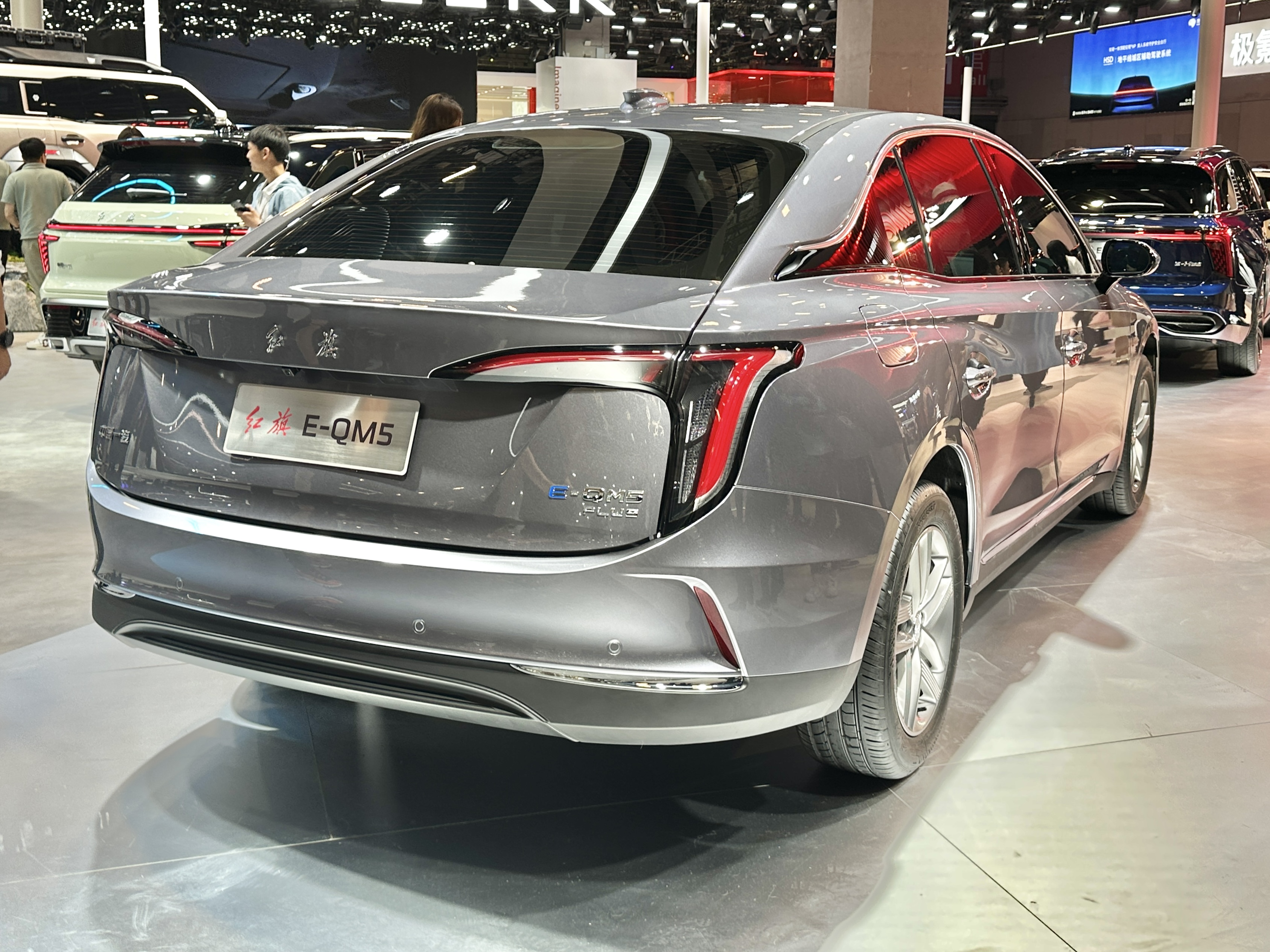
Rear view

== Sales ==
| Year | China |
|---|---|
| 2023 | 72,670 |
| 2024 | 75,677 |
| 2025 | 48,915 |
