= Hongqi H5 =

Chinese compact luxury sedan

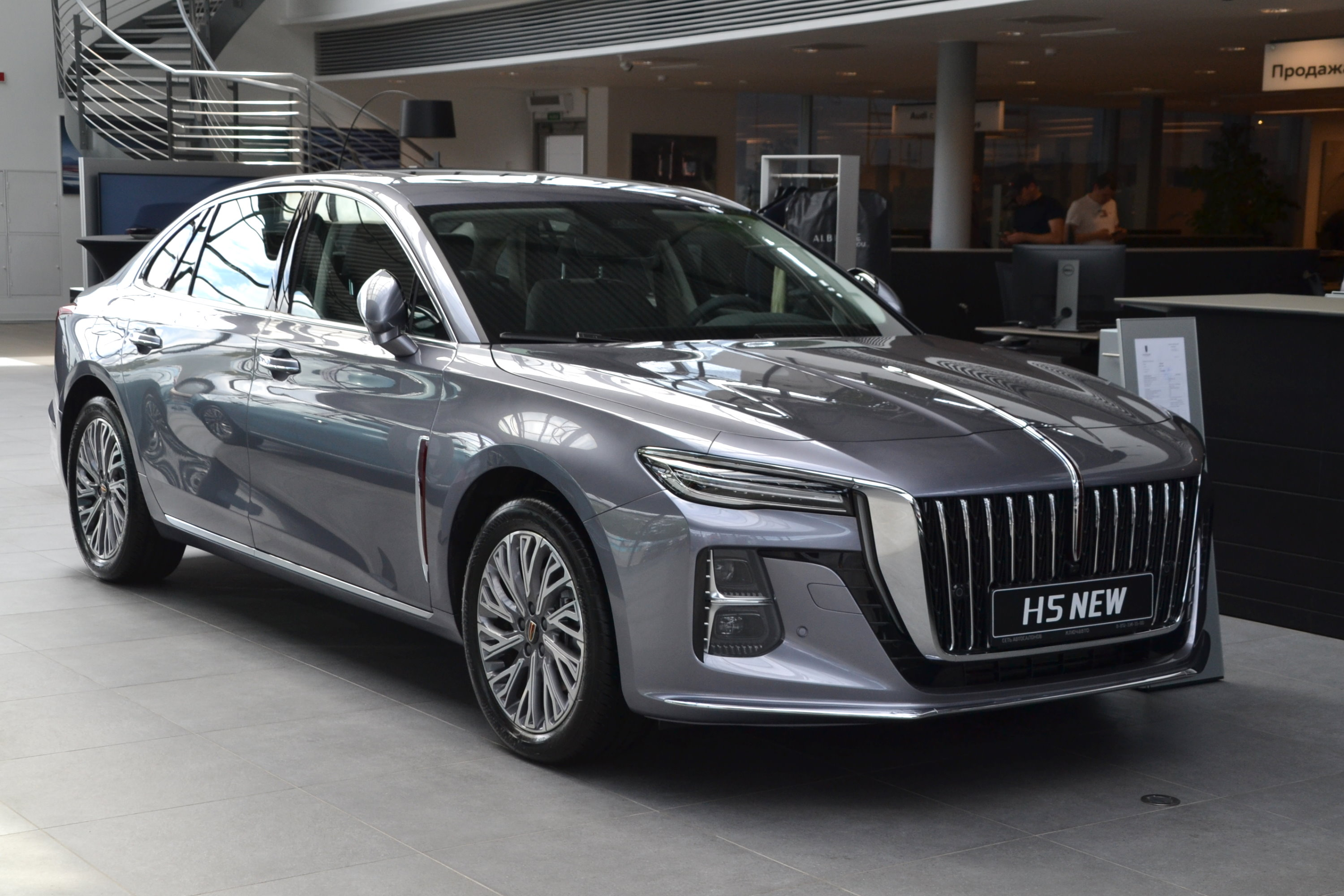
- Second generation Hongqi H5

Overview
- Manufacturer: Hongqi (FAW Group)
- Production: 2017–present

Body and chassis
- Class: Compact executive car (D)
- Body style: 4-door sedan

Chronology
- Predecessor: Bestune B90

The Hongqi H5 is a compact executive car produced by Chinese automobile manufacturer Hongqi, a subsidiary of FAW Group from 2017. It was positioned under the Hongqi H7 full-size luxury car. The second generation Hongqi H5 was unveiled in 2022 with updated design language shared with the Hongqi H9 flagship.

== First generation (2017–2022) ==
First generation
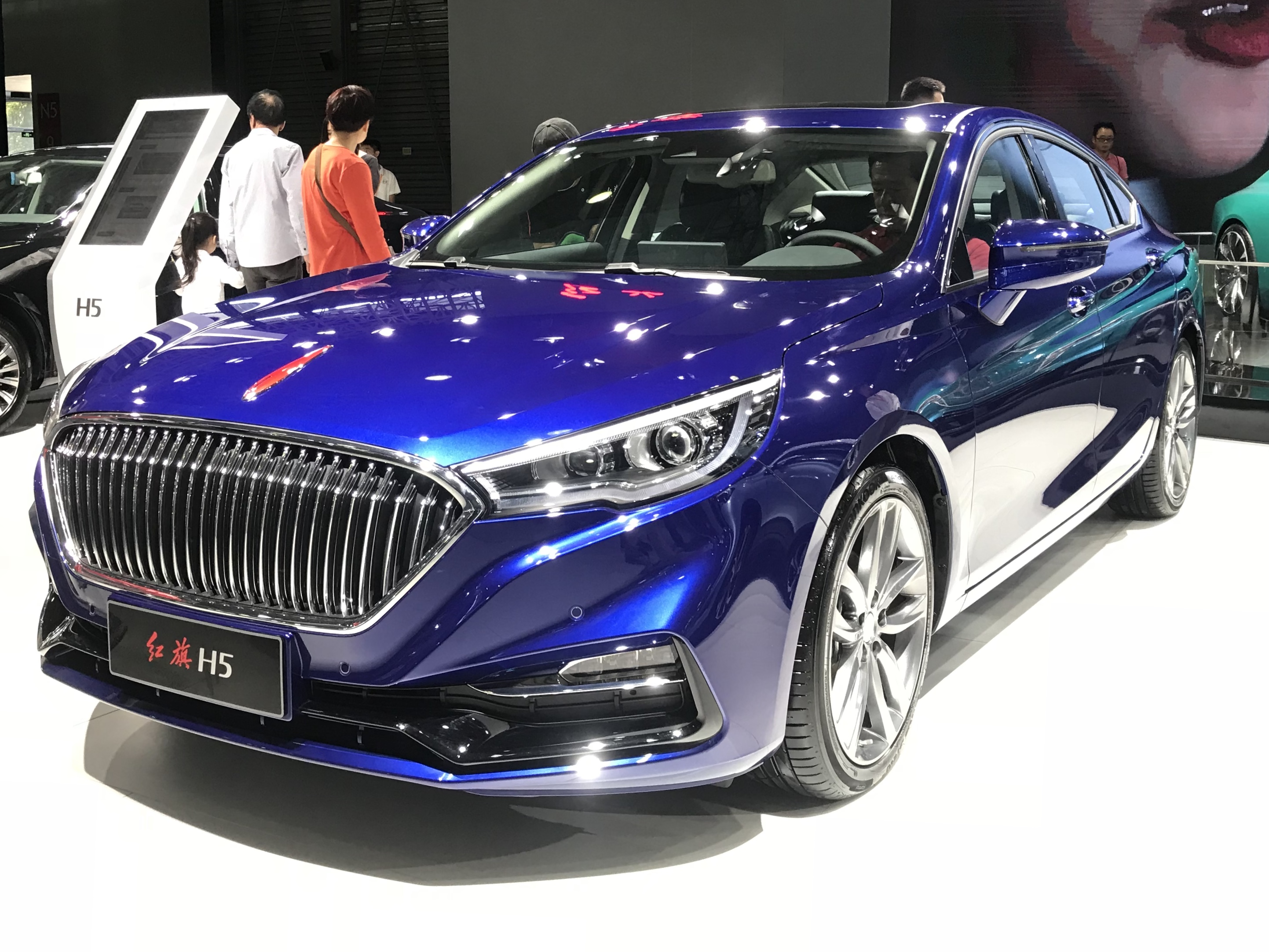
- Hongqi H5 (facelift)

Overview
- Production: 2017–2022
- Assembly: China: Changchun, Jilin

Body and chassis
- Class: Compact executive car (D)
- Body style: 4-door sedan
- Layout: FF layout
- Platform: Mazda GJ platform

Powertrain
- Engine: 1.5 L CA4GB15TD-30 I4 (turbo petrol); 1.8 L CA4GC18TD-30 I4 (turbo petrol)
- Electric motor: Belt-Driven Starter Generator
- Power output: 124 kW (169 PS; 166 hp) (1.5T); 131 kW (178 PS; 176 hp) (1.8T)
- Transmission: 7-speed DCT (1.5 L); 6-speed automatic (1.8 L)
- Hybrid drivetrain: 48V light hybrid system (MHEV) (1.8T)

Dimensions
- Wheelbase: 2,875 mm (113.2 in)
- Length: 4,945 mm (194.7 in)
- Width: 1,845 mm (72.6 in)
- Height: 1,470 mm (57.9 in)

Chronology
- Predecessor: Bestune B90
- Successor: Hongqi E-QM5 (Electric); Hongqi H6

The first generation Hongqi H5 was originally reviewed as a preproduction concept during the 2017 Shanghai Auto Show, the production Hongqi H5 mid-size sedan debuted on the 2017 Guangzhou Auto Show. The Hongqi H5 is based on the same platform as the third generation Mazda 6 (GJ/GL), which is known as Mazda Atenza (produced by FAW-Mazda joint venture) in the Chinese market.

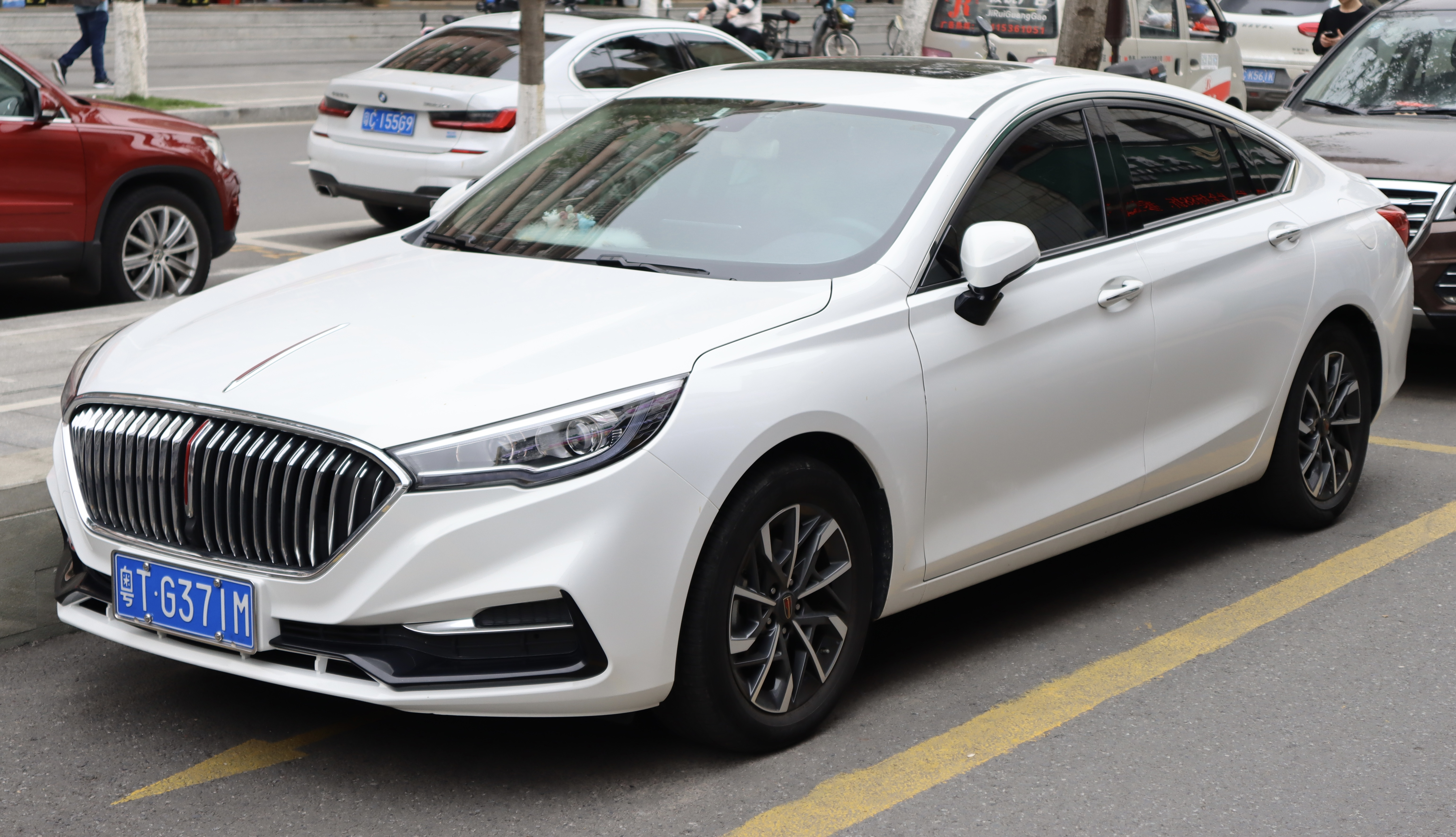
Hongqi H5 (pre-facelift)

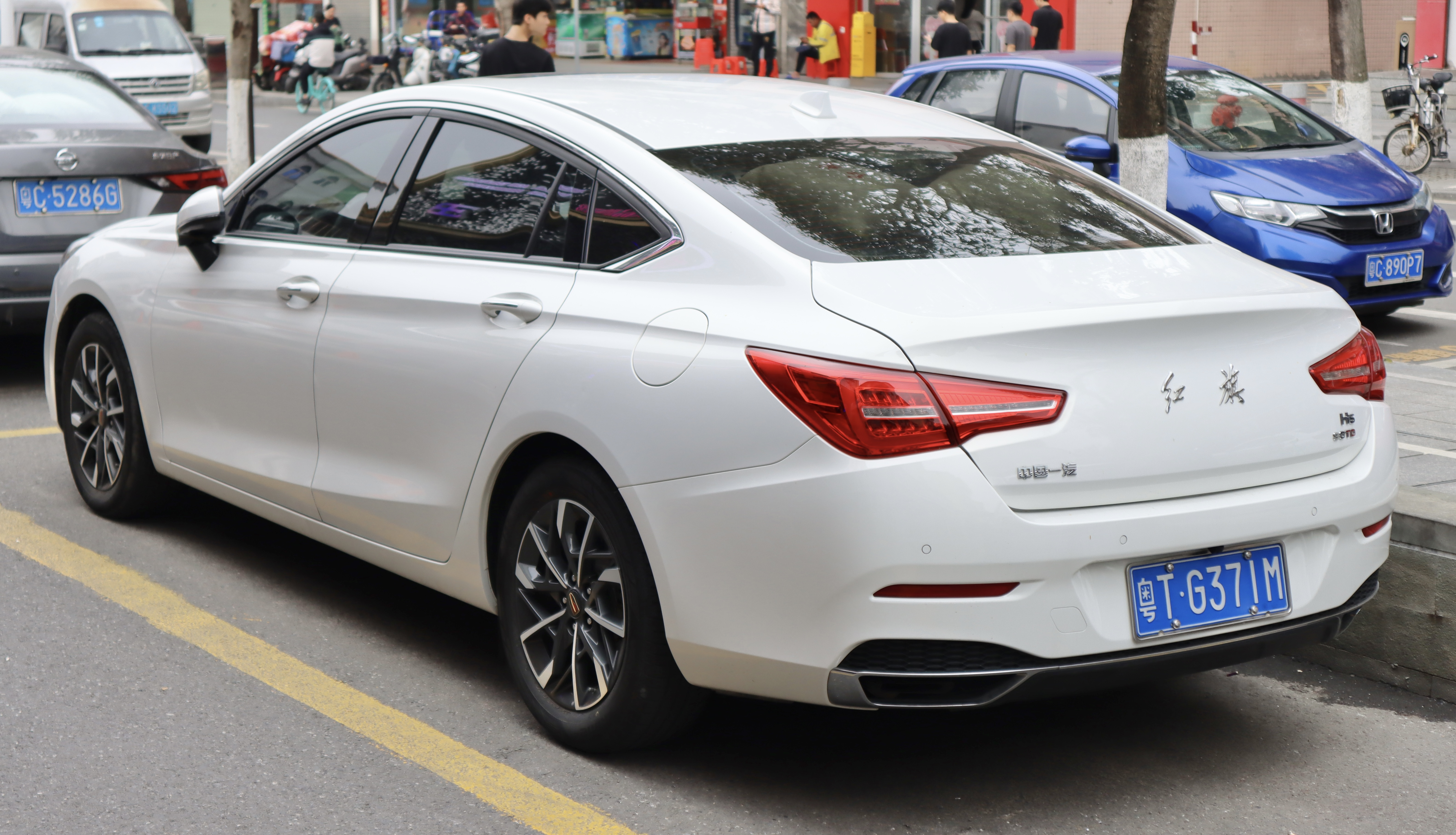
Rear view

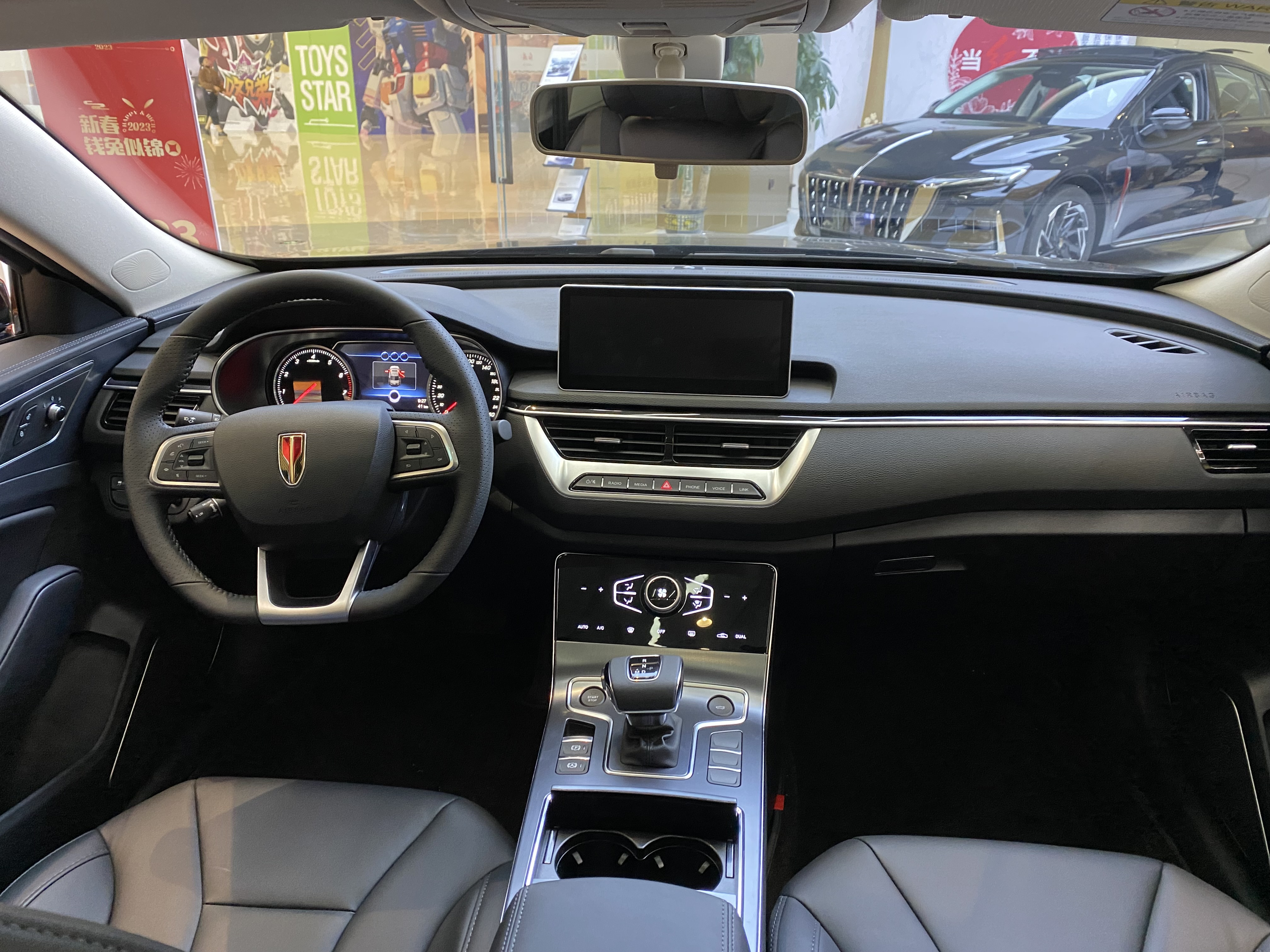
Interior

=== Powertrain ===
For the 2018 model year, the only engine option was a 1.8-litre turbo producing 178 hp (133 kW; 180 PS) and 250 N⋅m (184 lb⋅ft) of torque, the engine was mated to a 6-speed automatic gearbox. with prices ranging from 149,800 to 195,800 yuan.

For the 2020 model year, The 1.8-liter turbo was updated with a 48V mild hybrid system producing 197 hp (147 kW; 200 PS) and 320 N⋅m (236 lb⋅ft) of torque, and the transmission remained to be the 6-speed automatic gearbox. a new 1.5-litre turbo producing 169 hp (126 kW; 171 PS) and 258 N⋅m (190 lb⋅ft) of torque mated to a 7-speed dual-clutch gearbox option was added to the production line. With prices ranging from 145,800 to 190,800 yuan.

=== Hongqi H5 Sports ===
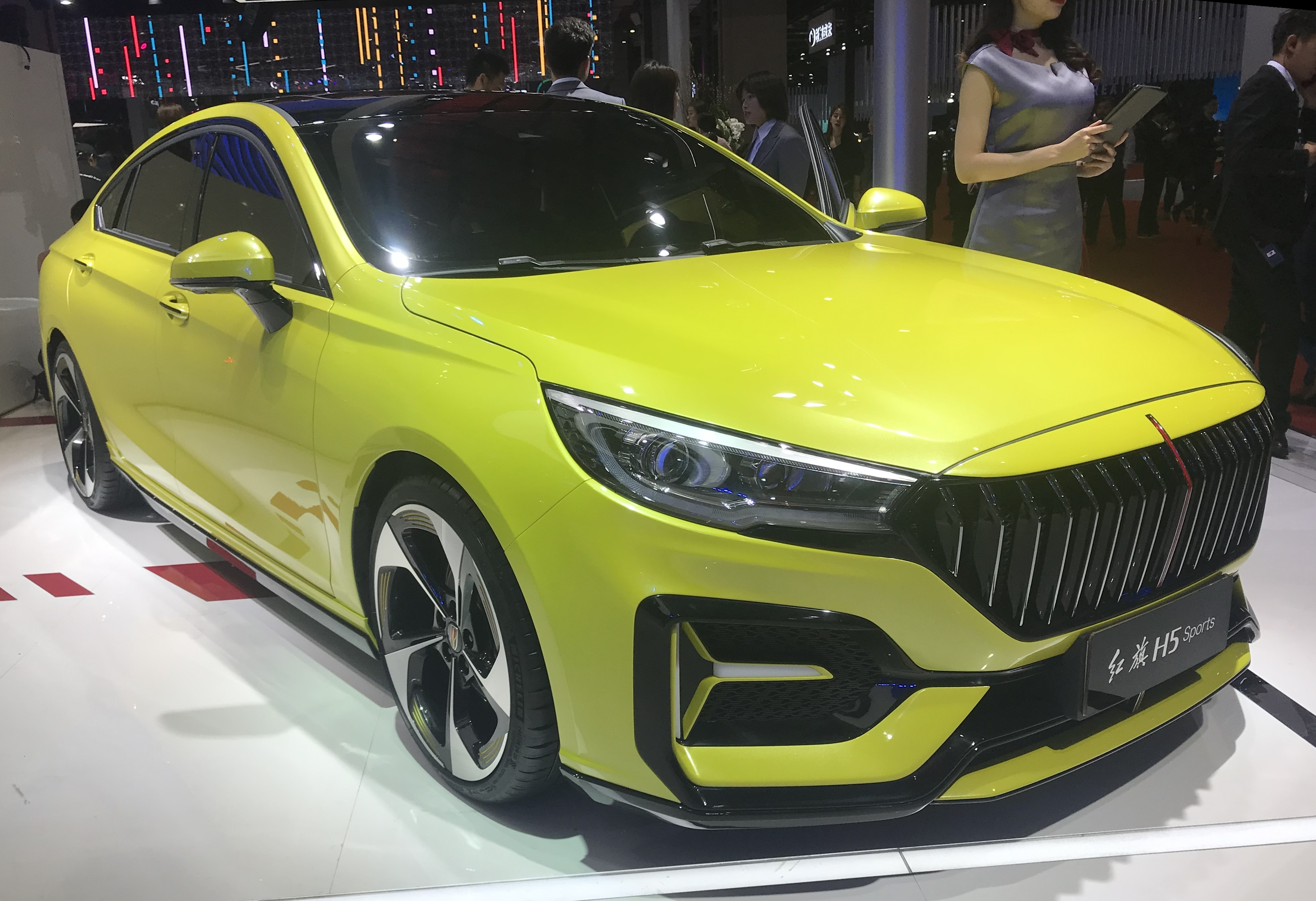
Hongqi H5 Sports

The Hongqi H5 Sports was offered as a sports oriented appearance package for the Hongqi H5. It featured a more aggressive looking front and rear bumper, a reworked grille, glossy black trim accents and a boot-mounted spoiler, and quad exhaust tips. However, the powertrain remained to be the same and was unchanged.

== Second generation (2022–present) ==
Second generation
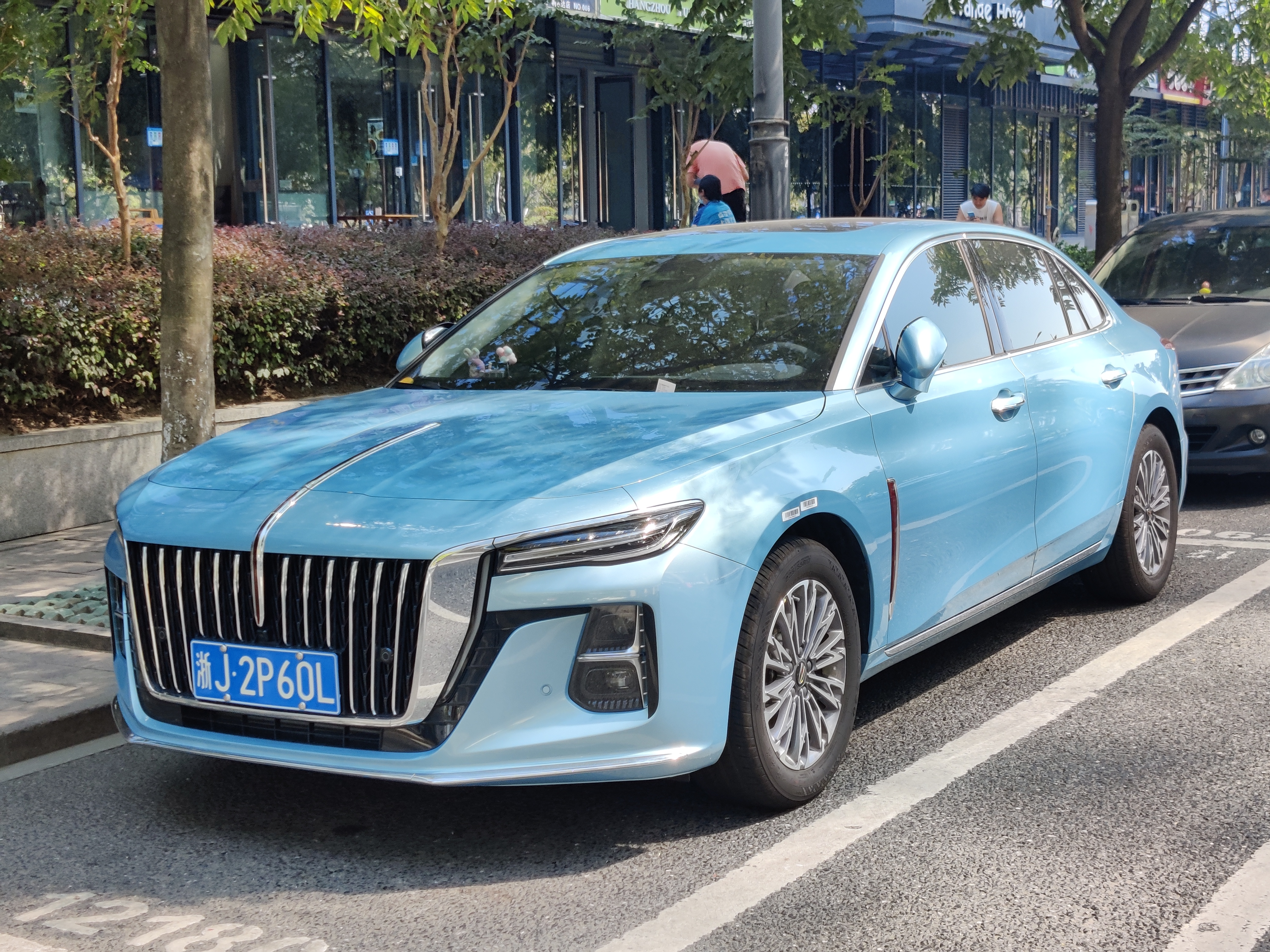
- Second generation Hongqi H5

Overview
- Also called: Hongqi Ousado (Middle East)
- Production: 2022–present
- Assembly: China: Changchun, Jilin
- Designer: Xiu Yi

Body and chassis
- Class: Compact executive car (D)
- Body style: 4-door sedan
- Layout: FF layout

Powertrain
- Engine: 1.5 L CA4GB15TD-30 I4 (turbo petrol); 2.0 L CA4GC20TD-33 I4 (turbo petrol)
- Electric motor: Belt-Driven Starter Generator
- Power output: 124 kW (169 PS; 166 hp) (1.5T); 165 kW (224 PS; 221 hp) (2.0T)
- Transmission: 7-speed DCT (1.5 L); 8-speed automatic (2.0 L); E-CVT (1.5T HEV)
- Hybrid drivetrain: Hybrid (1.5T)

Dimensions
- Wheelbase: 2,920 mm (115.0 in)
- Length: 4,988 mm (196.4 in)
- Width: 1,875 mm (73.8 in)
- Height: 1,470 mm (57.9 in)

Media images of the second generation Hongqi H5 were released in March 2022. The second generation model features a completely redesigned exterior in the same style of the Hongqi H9 flagship.

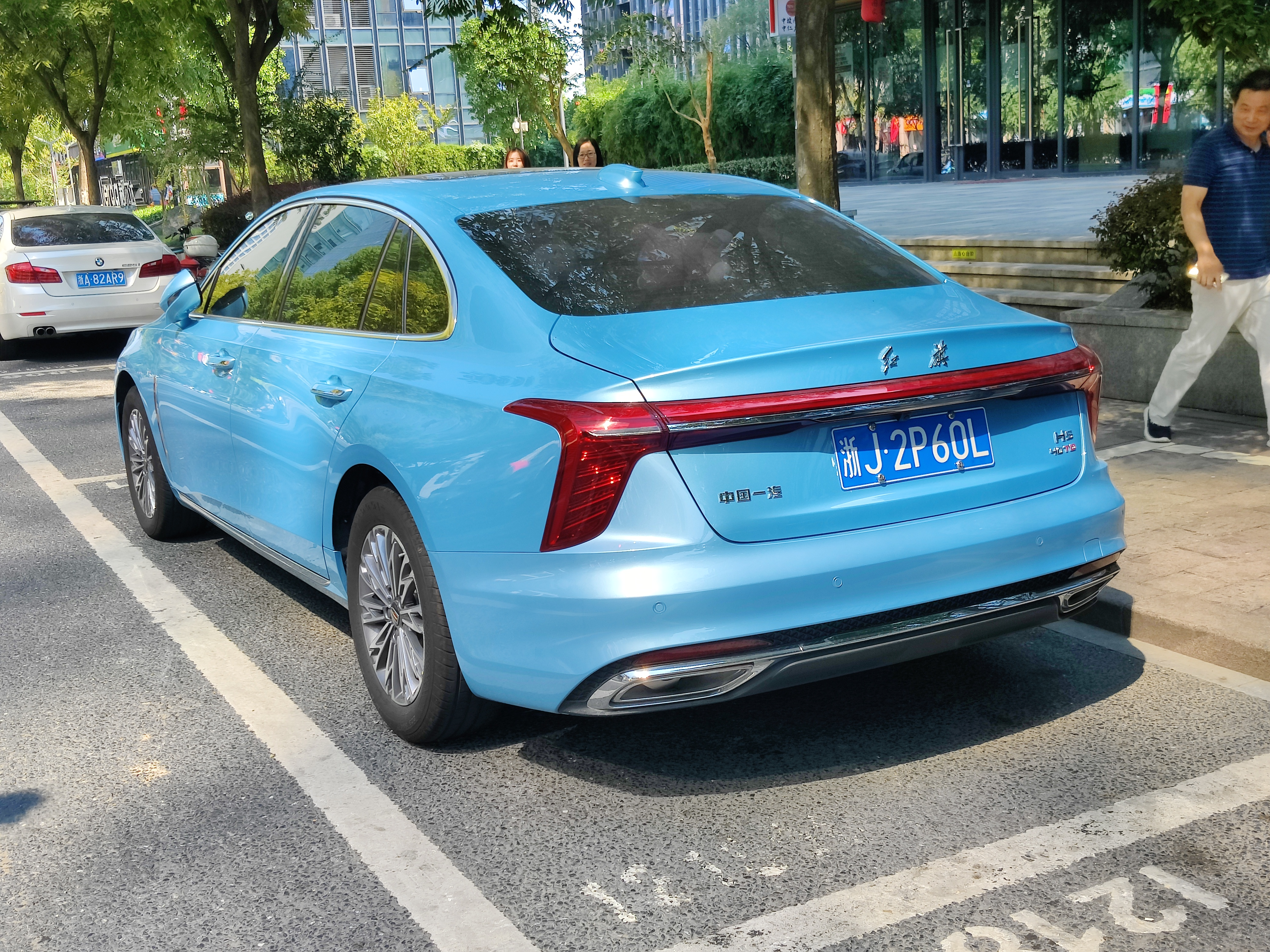
Rear view

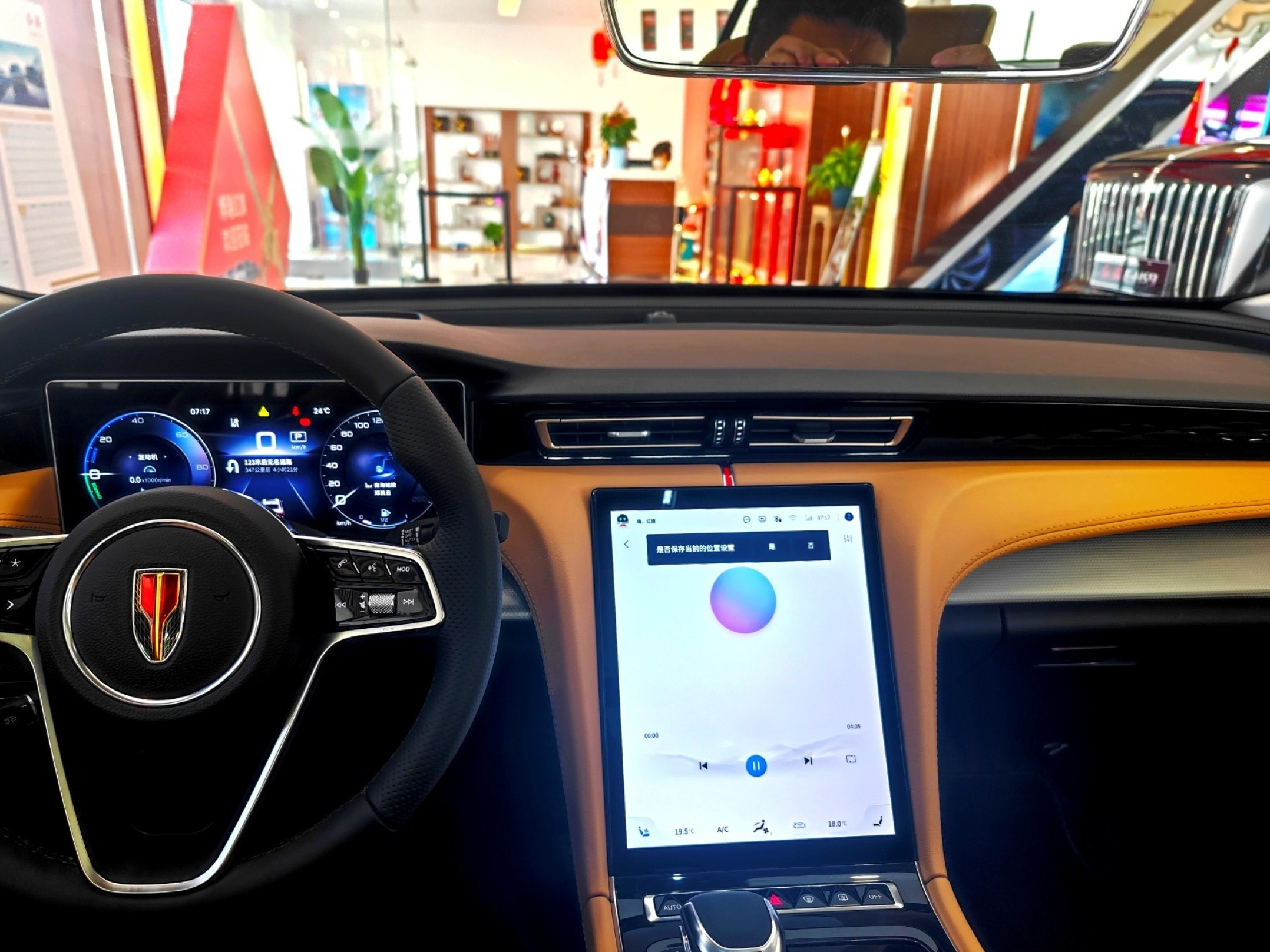
Interior

== Sales ==
| Year | China | | |
| Year | H5 | PHEV | Total |
|---|---|---|---|
| 2023 | 99,773 | — | 99,773 |
| 2024 | 147,034 | — | 147,034 |
| 2025 | 143,193 | 12,519 | 155,712 |
