= Jiabao V52 =

The Jiabao V52 and Jiabao V55 is a five- to eight-seater Microvan made by FAW Jilin under the Jiabao sub-brand. The pickup body counterparts are sold as the Jiabao T50 and Jiabao T57.

The Jiabao V52 and V55 are successors of the original cabover design Jiabao CA6361 sold from 1999 to 2009 and the rear half of the van body were carried-over to the V52 and V55 models while the pickup variant of the Jiabao CA6361 continued production and sold as the Jiabao T51.

== Jiabao CA6350/ CA6361 ==
Jiabao CA6361A1
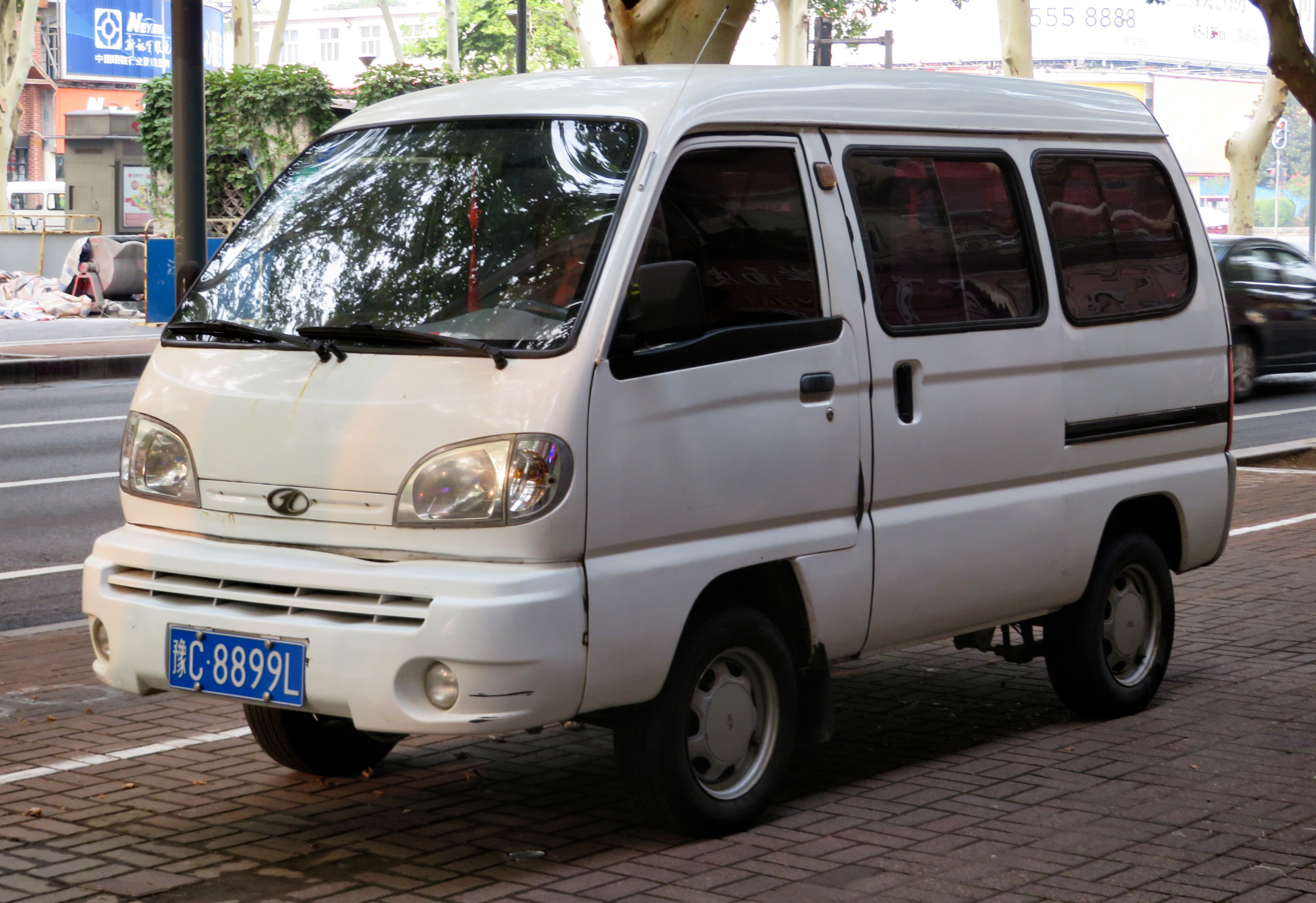

Overview
- Manufacturer: FAW Jilin (FAW Group)
- Production: 1999-2009

Body and chassis
- Class: Microvan; Micro-truck (Jiabao T51)
- Body style: Microvan; Micro-truck (Jiabao T51)

Powertrain
- Engine: 1.0L I4
- Transmission: 5 speed manual

Dimensions
- Wheelbase: 1,940 mm (76.4 in)
- Length: 3,625 mm (142.7 in)
- Width: 1,445 mm (56.9 in)
- Height: 1,841 mm (72.5 in)

Chronology
- Successor: Jiabao V52/ V55

The FAW Jiefang bus CA6361 and the original Jiefang Jiabao CA6350 is made in China by FAW Jilin Automobile Co., Ltd.. The company is located in Jilin, in Jilin Province, China, and the CA6361 is one of its earliest mass-produced models. The CA6361 vans were sold from 1999 to 2009.

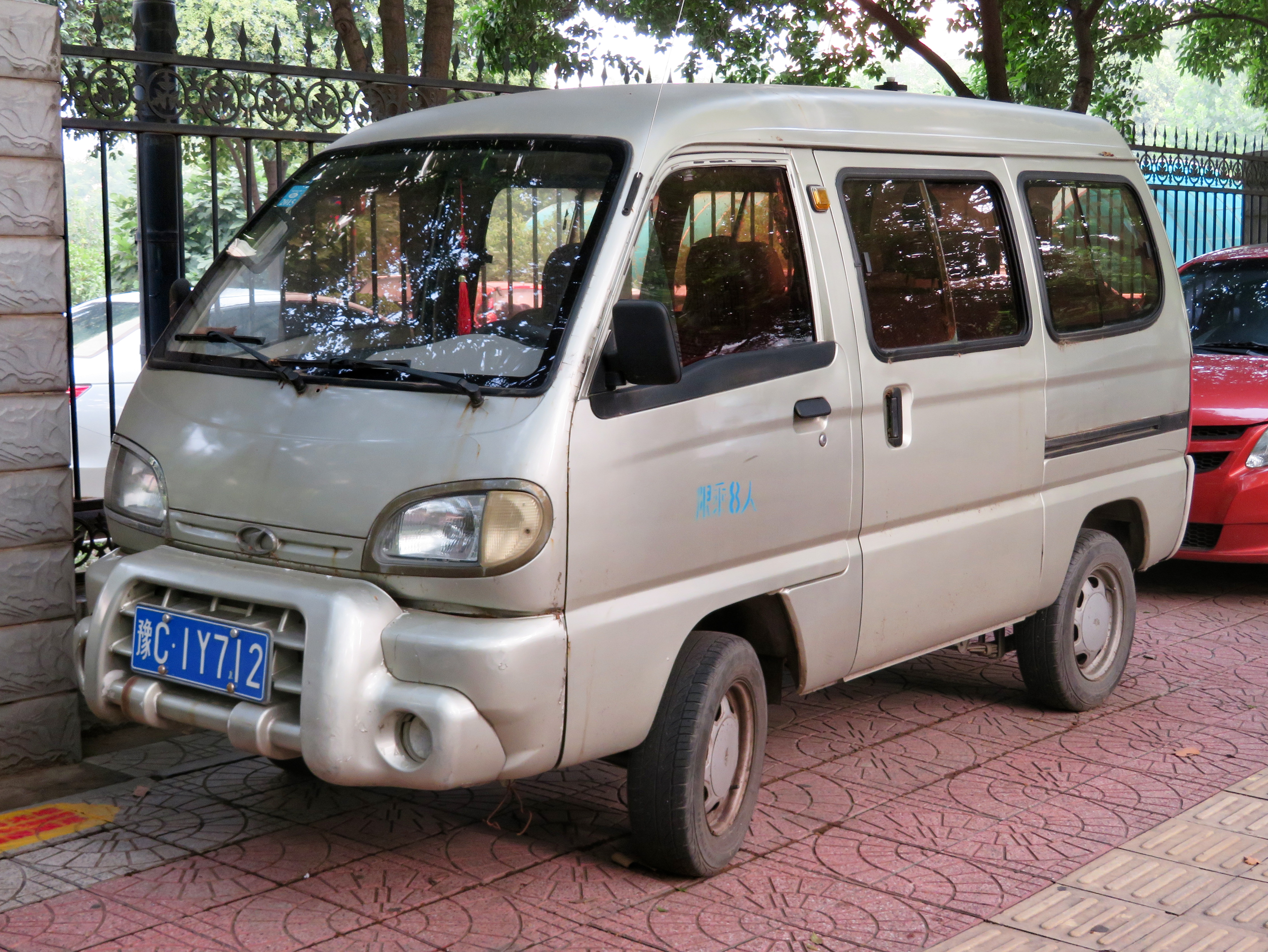
FAW-Jilin Jiabao CA6361

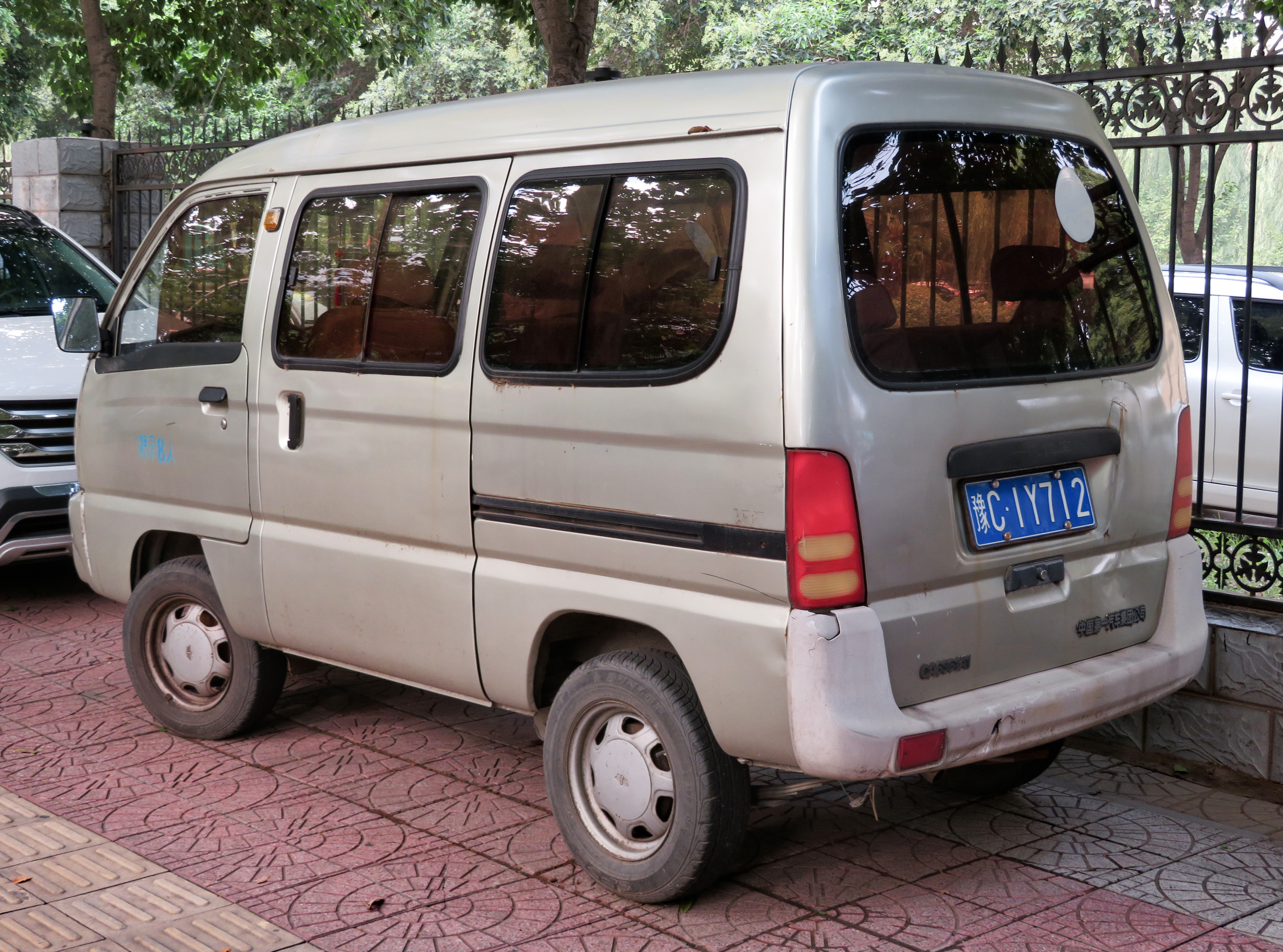
Rear view

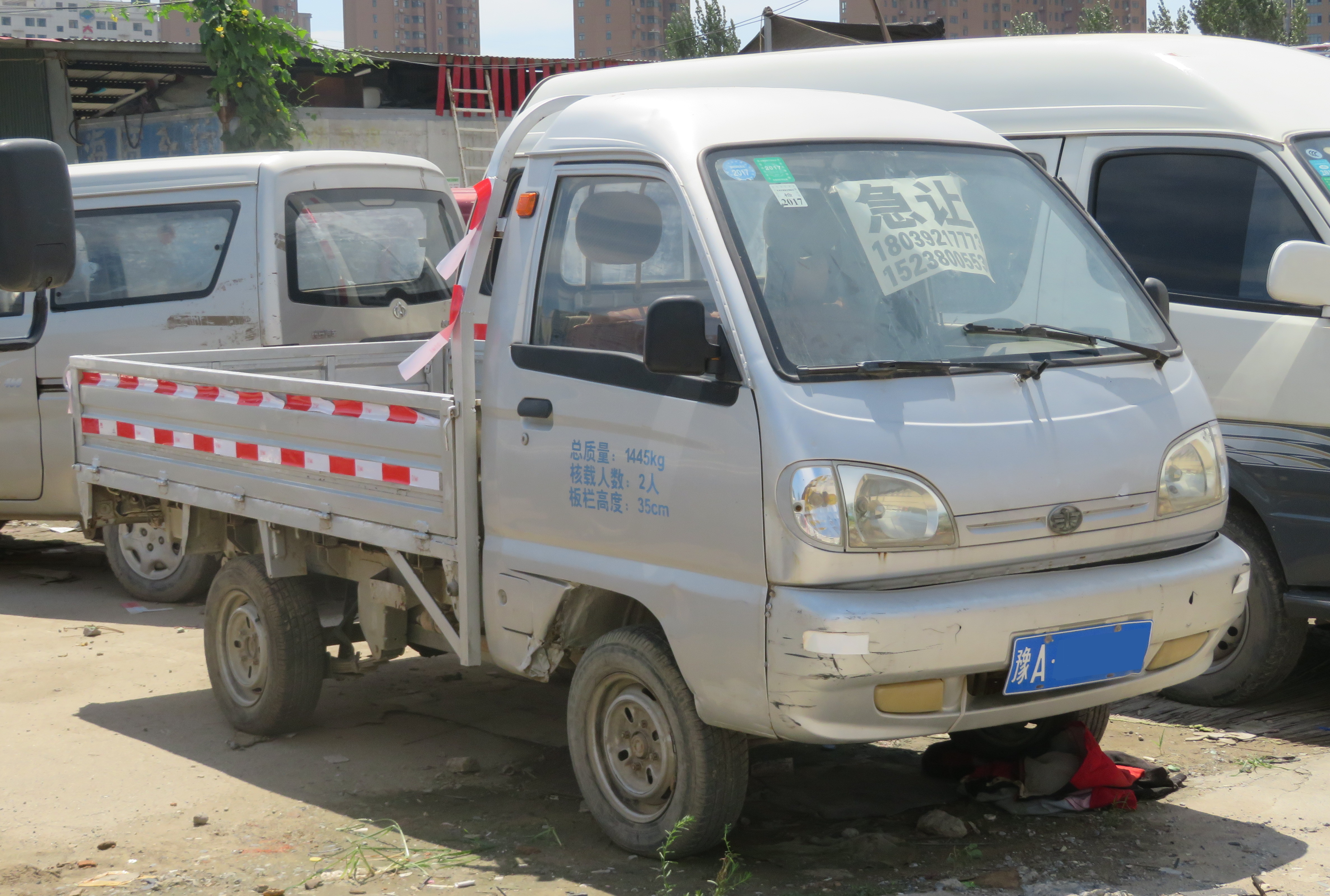
FAW-Jilin Jiabao T51

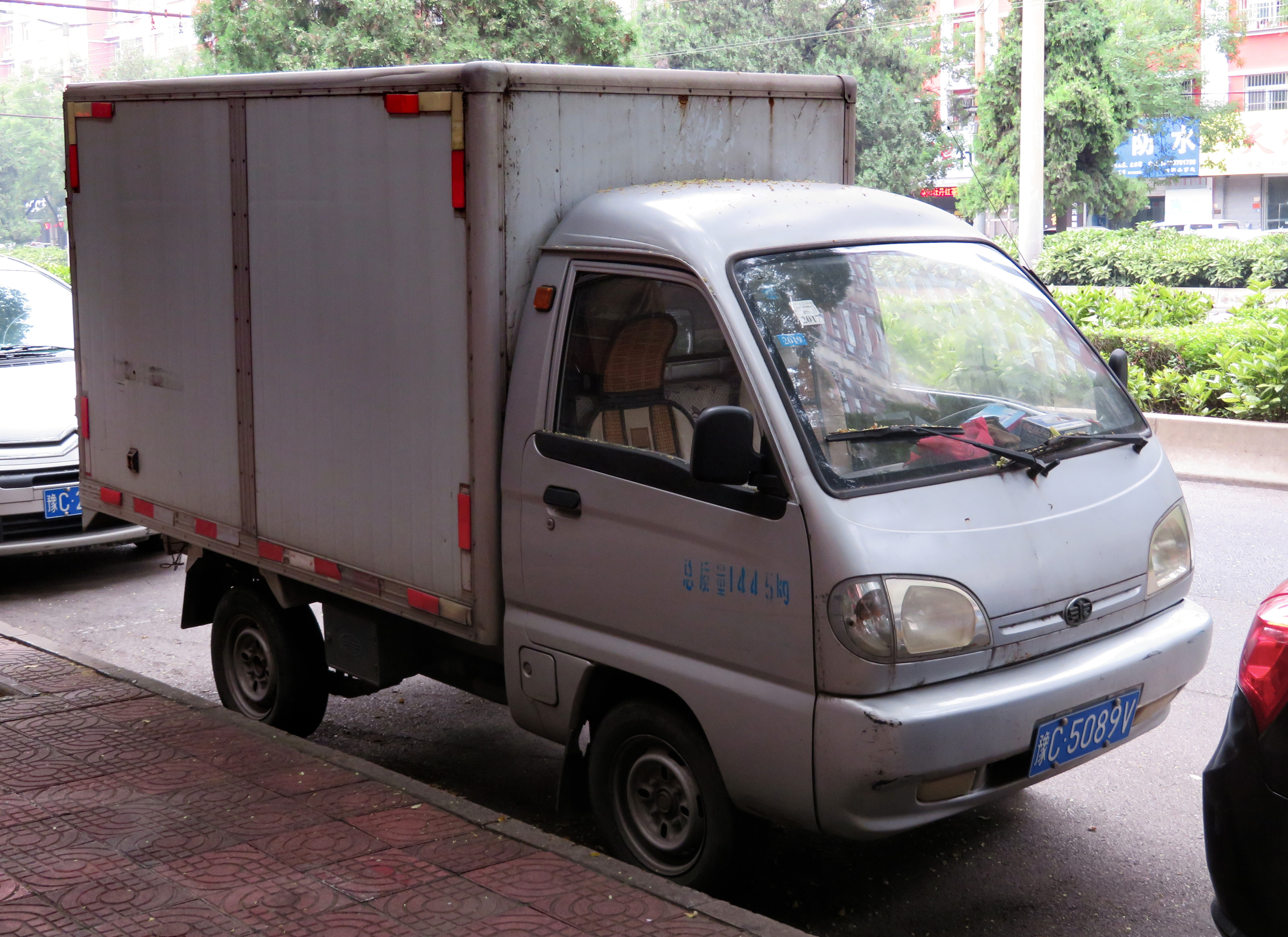
Box truck variant

== Jiabao V52 and V55 ==
Jiabao V52/V55
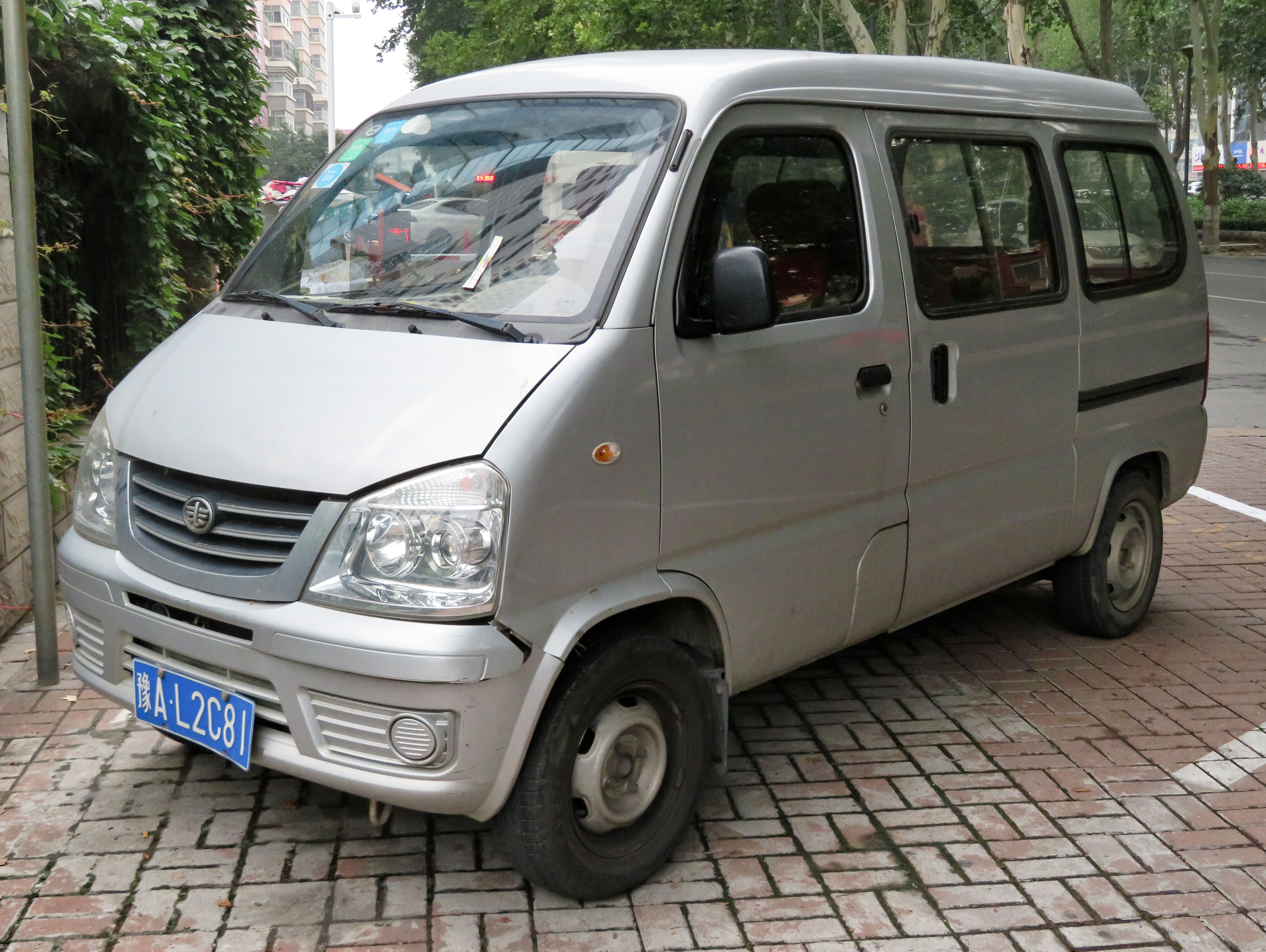

Overview
- Manufacturer: FAW Jilin (FAW Group)
- Also called: FAW GF8 (Mexico); Jiabao T50/ T57(micro-truck variant); Pyeonghwa Samcheonri 0708/0808 (North Korea); Vantage GreenVan (EV Van, United States); Vantage GreenTruck (EV Pickup, United States); Vantage VanGO (Van, United States); Vantage TruckALL (Pickup, United States)
- Production: 2011-present

Body and chassis
- Class: Microvan; Micro-truck (Jiabao T50/ T57)
- Body style: Microvan; Micro-truck (Jiabao T50/ T57)

Powertrain
- Engine: 1.0 L DA465QA I4 (petrol) (pre-facelift model); 1.0 L LJ465QE1 I4 (petrol) (facelift model)
- Transmission: 5 speed manual

Dimensions
- Wheelbase: 2,500 mm (98.4 in)
- Length: 3,741 mm (147.3 in)(V52); 4,045 mm (159.3 in)(V55)
- Width: 1,475 mm (58.1 in)(V52); 1,505 mm (59.3 in)(V55)
- Height: 1,870 mm (73.6 in)(V52); 1,880 mm (74.0 in)(V55)

Chronology
- Successor: Jiabao V70

=== Jiabao V52 ===
Launched in 2011, the Jiabao V52 was powered by either a 48 hp 1.0 liter Inline-four petrol engine or a 58 hp 1.0 liter Inline-four petrol engine. With the Jiabao V52 priced between 27,200 yuan and 29,200 yuan.

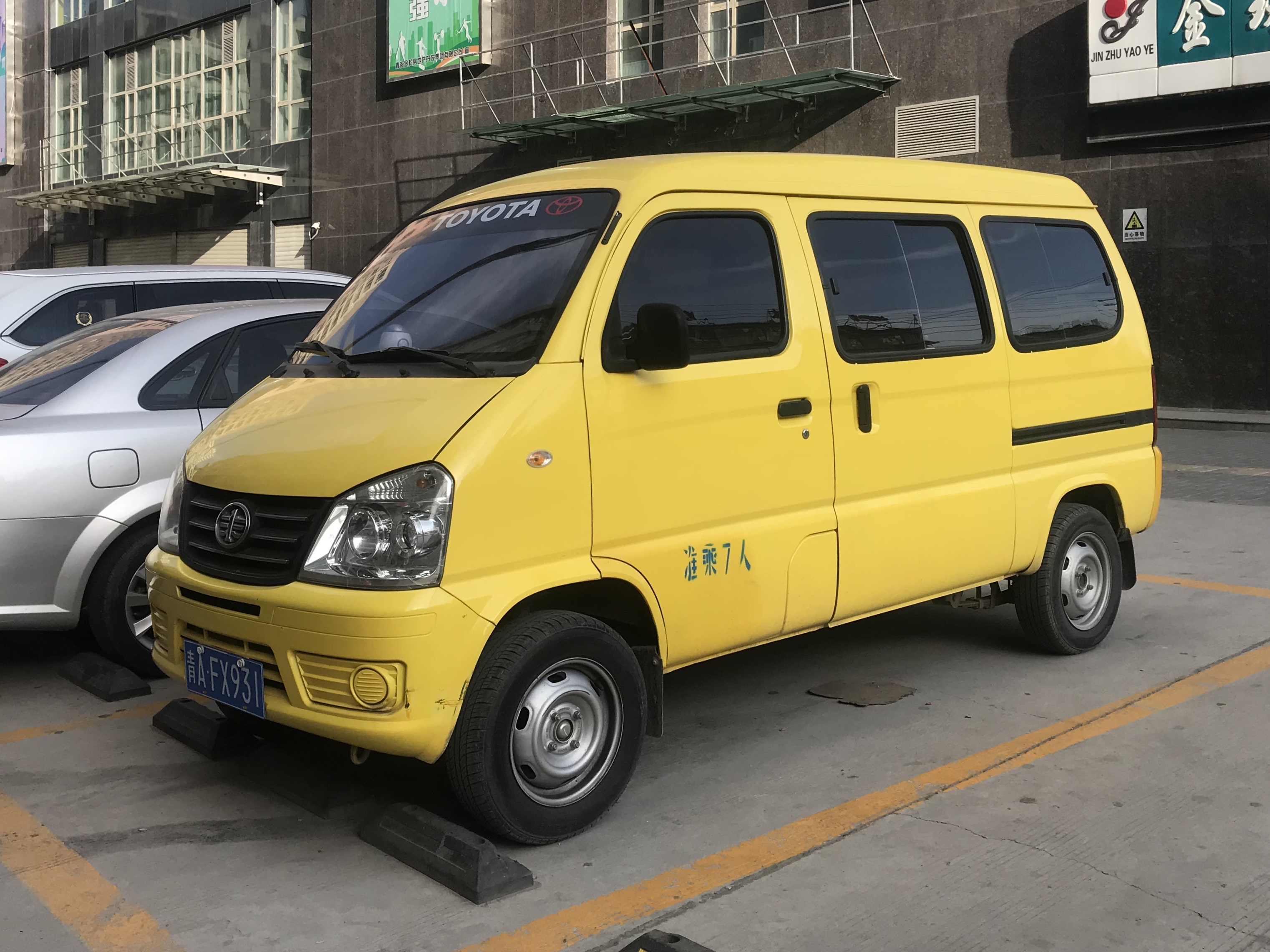
FAW Jiabao V52

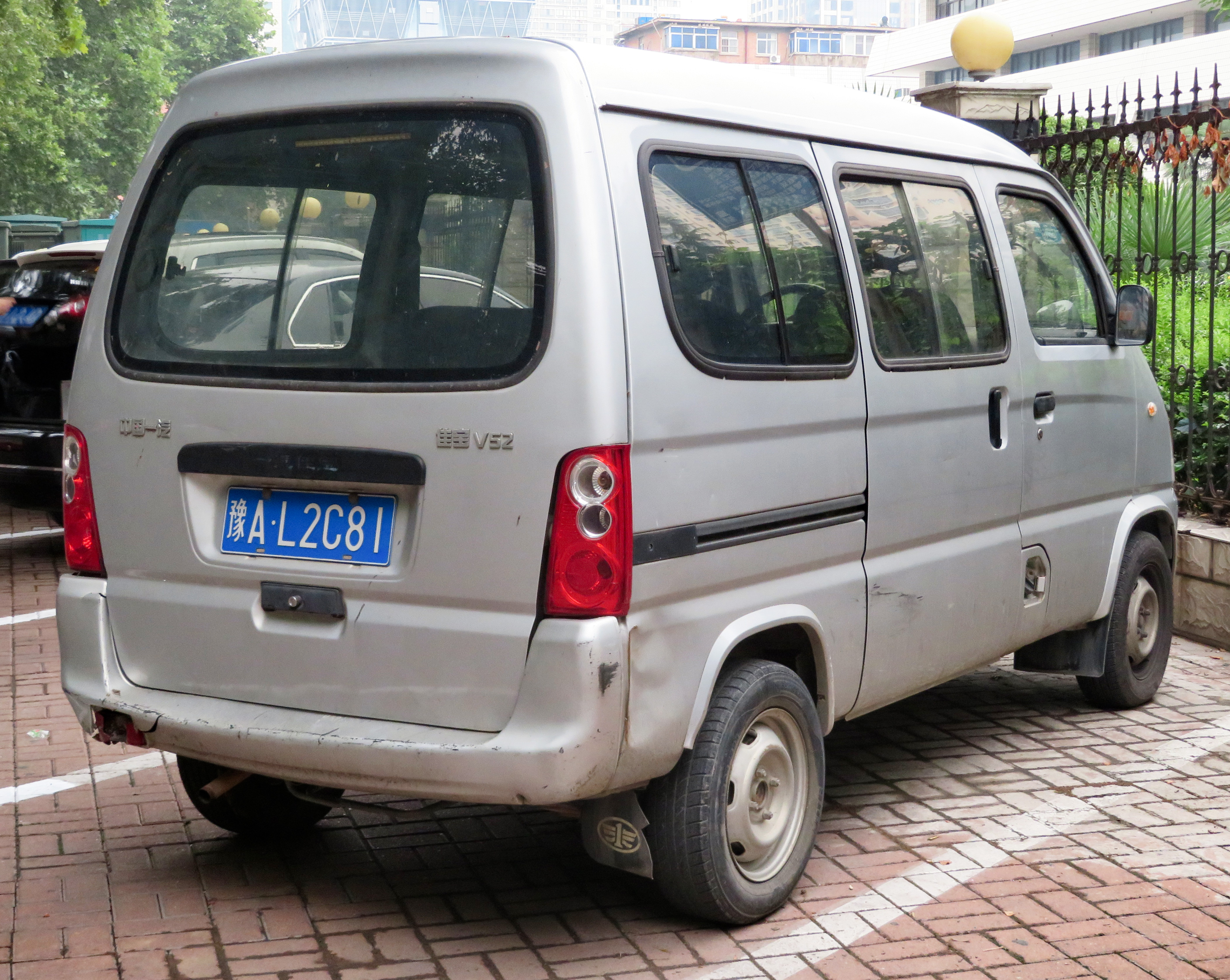
FAW Jiabao V52 rear
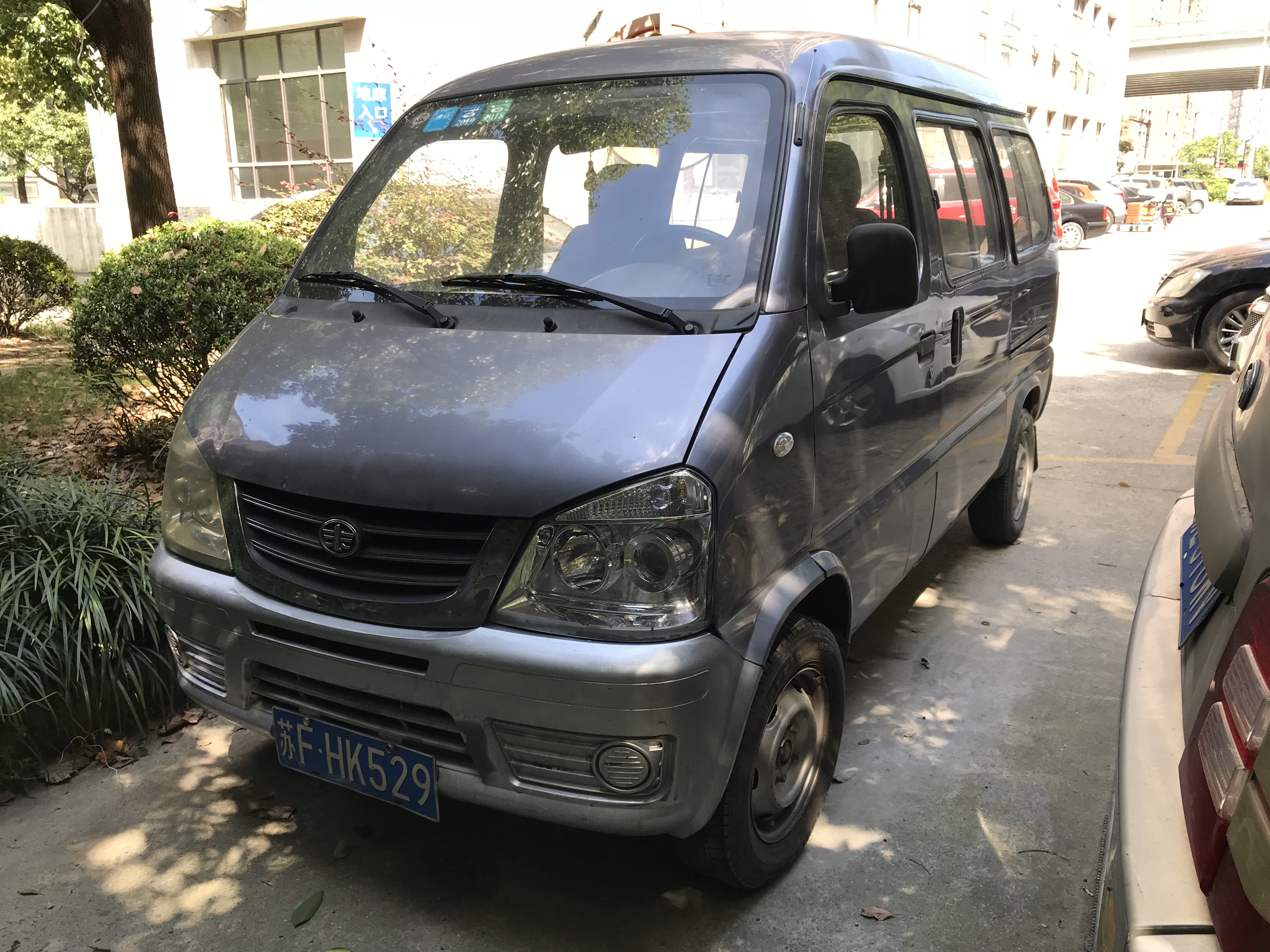
FAW Jiabao V52 facelift front

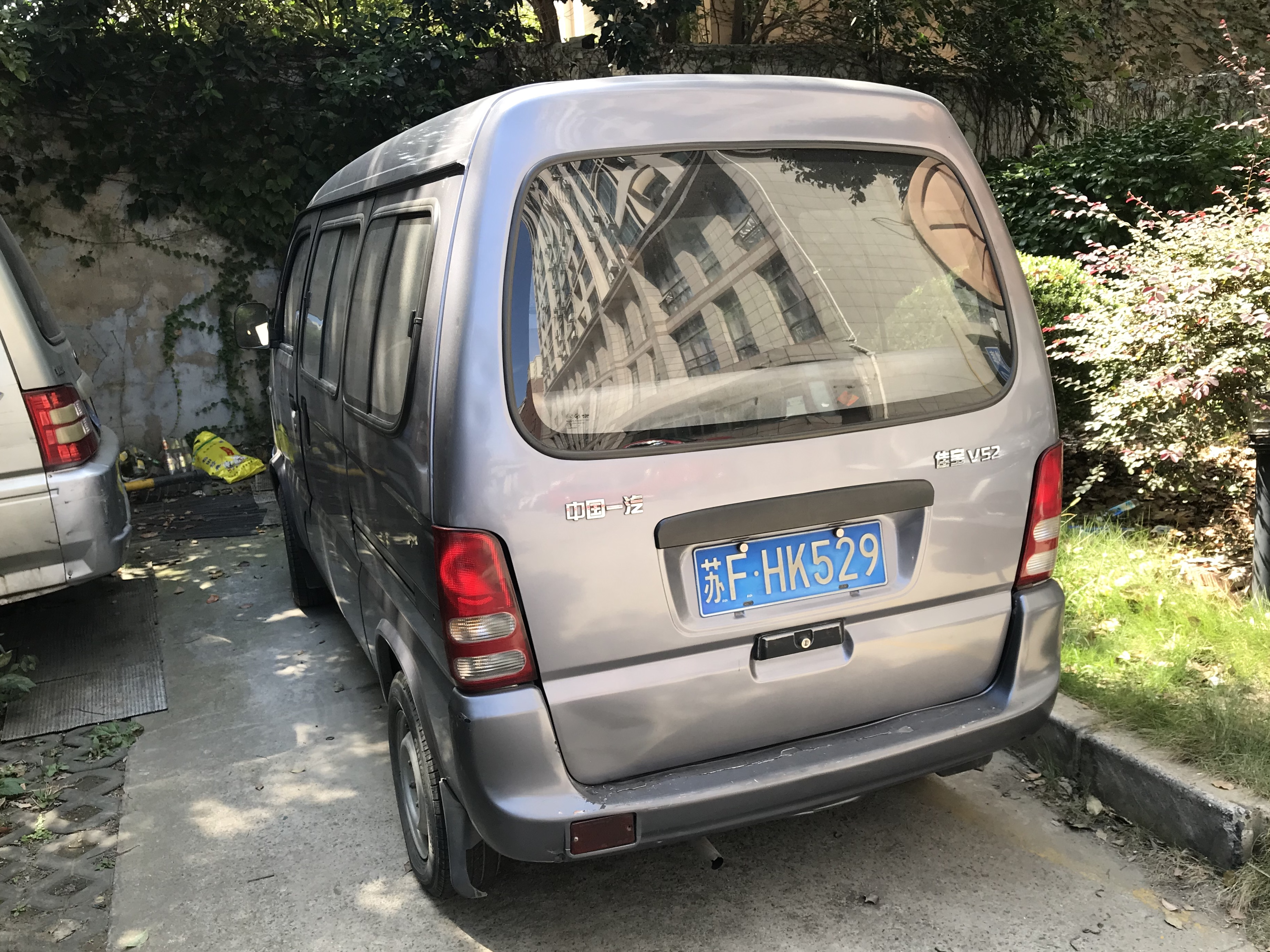
FAW Jiabao V52 facelift rear

=== Jiabao V55 ===
The Jiabao V52 also spawned a 304mm longer version called the Jiabao V55 with a single model priced at 32,900 yuan and powered by the same engine.

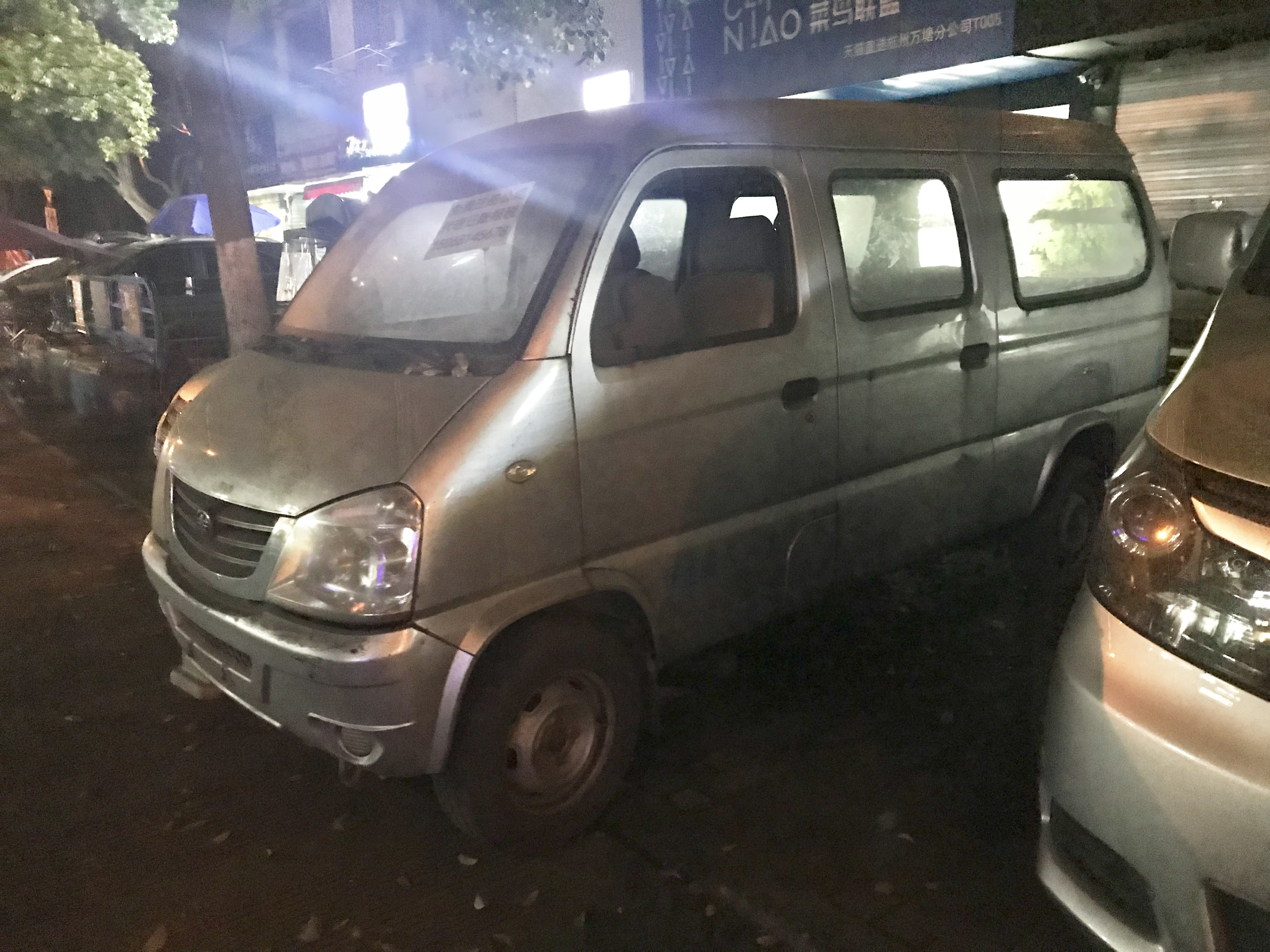
FAW Jiabao V55

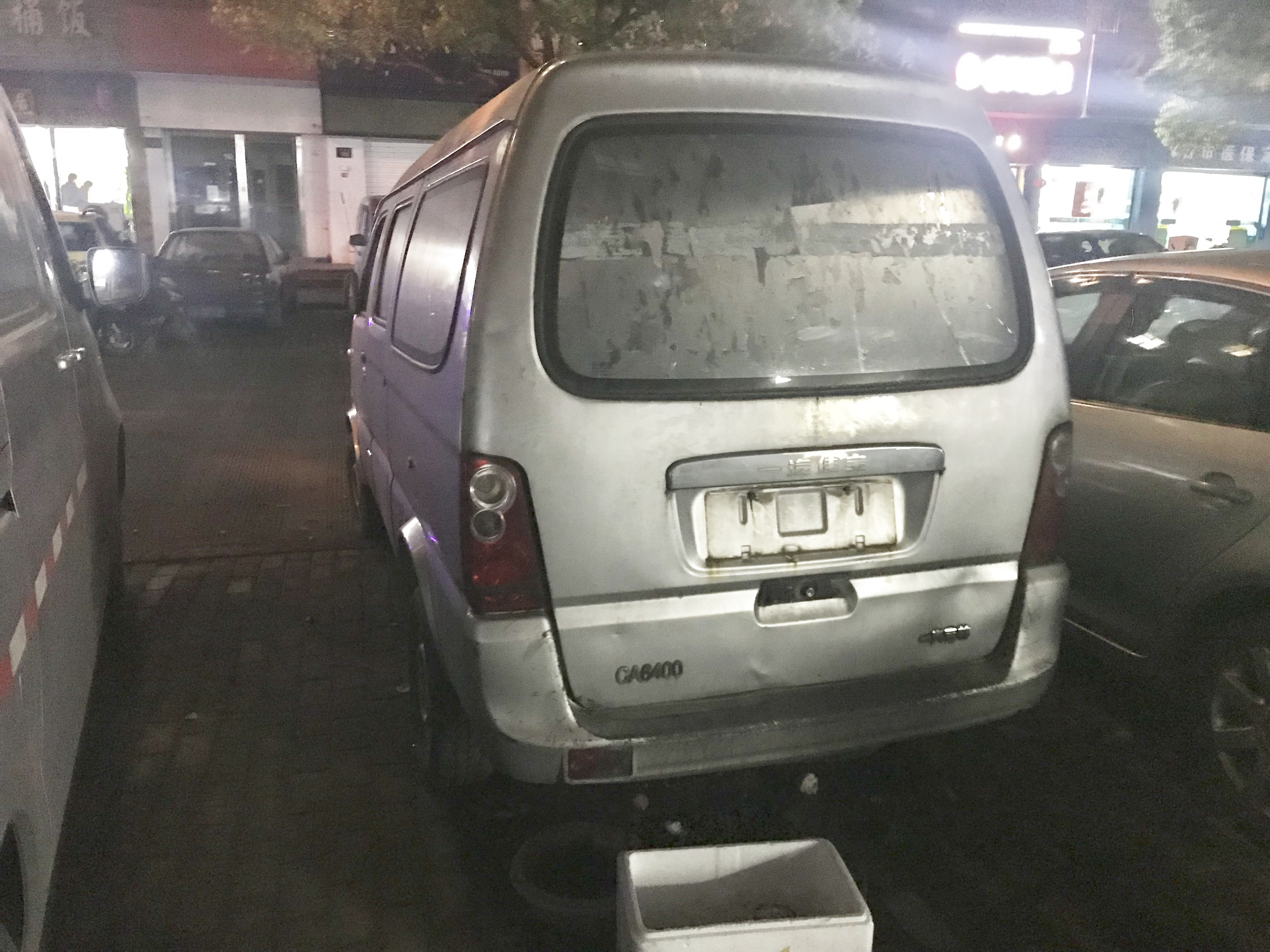
FAW Jiabao V55 rear

=== Overseas market ===
The Jiabao V52 was also produced by North Korean car manufacturer Pyeonghwa Motors as the Samcheonri 0708 and 0808. Pyeonghwa introduced a naming system using the classic names such as Samchonri followed by four-digit numbers with the first two based on either engine capacity, or number of seats or gross vehicle weight.

In North America, the Jiabao V52/ V55 and Jiabao T50/ T57 in both van and pickup variants are produced and sold as low speed electric vans and pickups by Vantage Vehicle International. Inc, a California-based manufacturer of mini-vehicles. The vehicles are LSVs or Low Speed Vehicle with the top speed being capped at 25 mph. The chassis and body for the truck and van is manufactured in China and shipped over to the States where the U.S.-made electric components are added. The rebuilt electric variants of the jiabao V52 and V55 are built to haul up to 1000 lbs. Truck body styles include a 2-passenger extended cab truck called the GreenTruck EVX 1000 or a 5-passenger crew cab truck nameded the GreenTruck EVR 1000. Vans available include a 5-passenger cargo van called the EVC 1000 GreenVan and a 7-passenger EVP 1000 GreenVan.

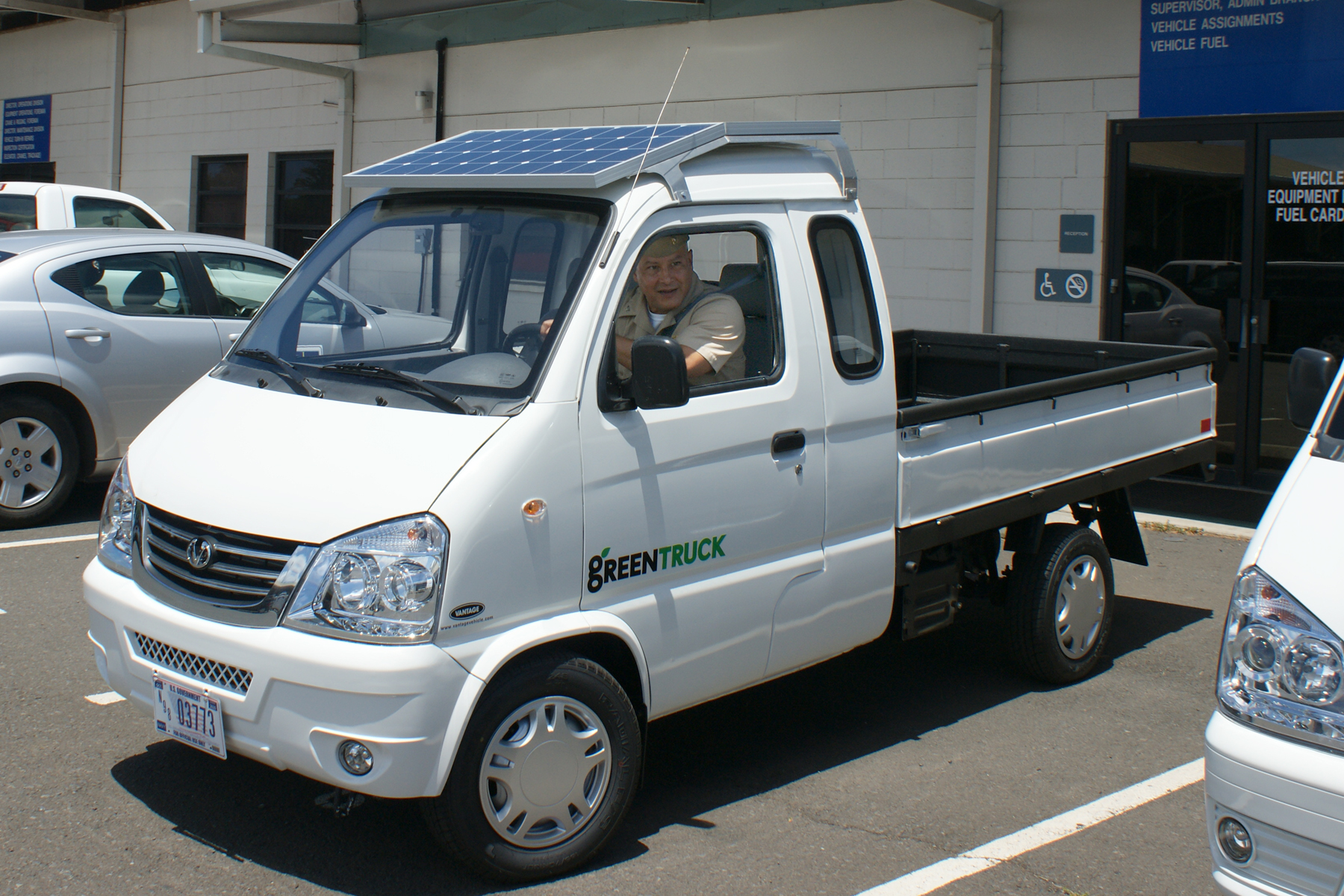
Vantage Vehicle International GreenTruck EVR 1000

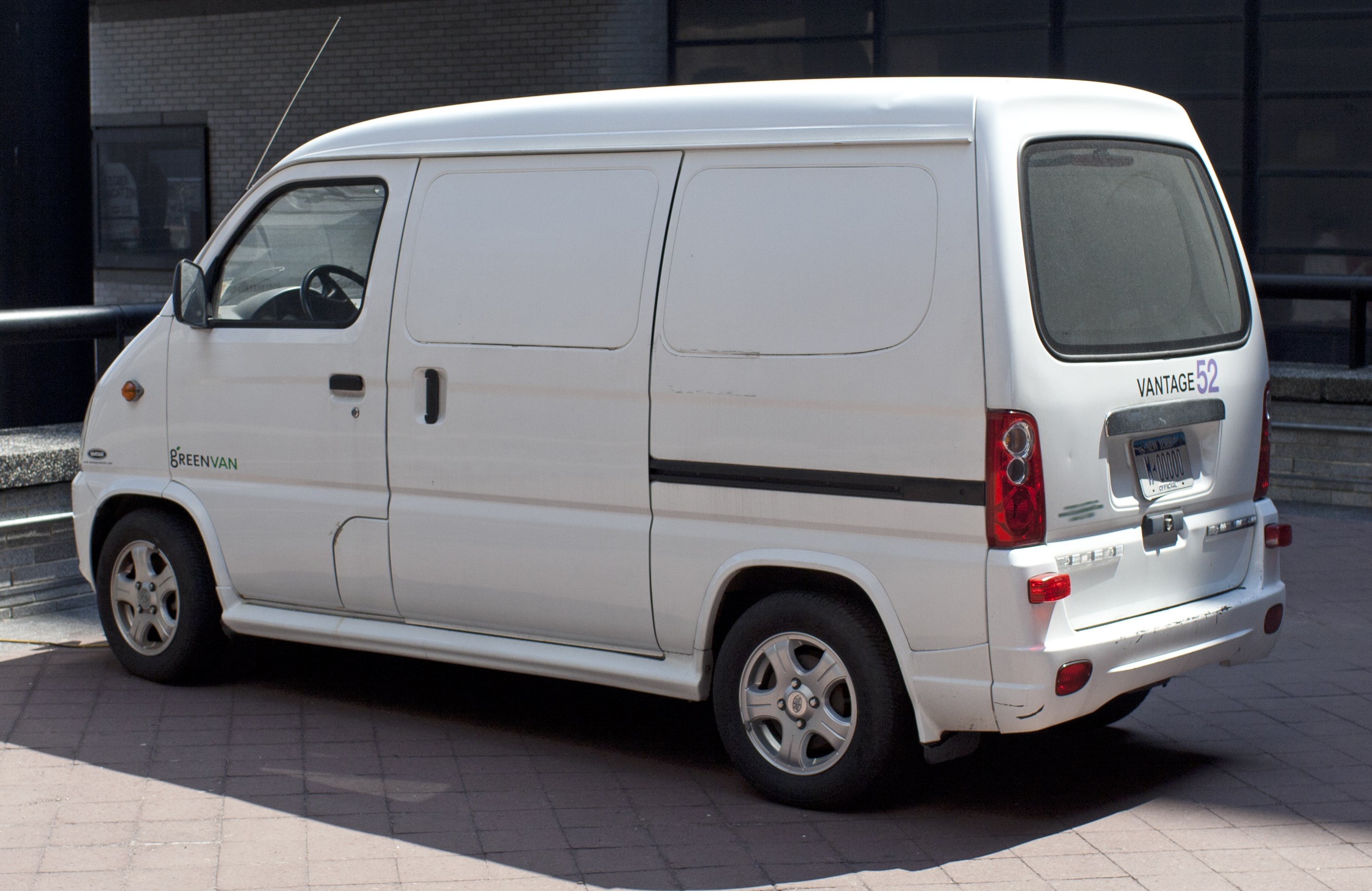
Vantage Vehicle International GreenVan EVC1000
