= Senya R9 =

Chinese compact CUV

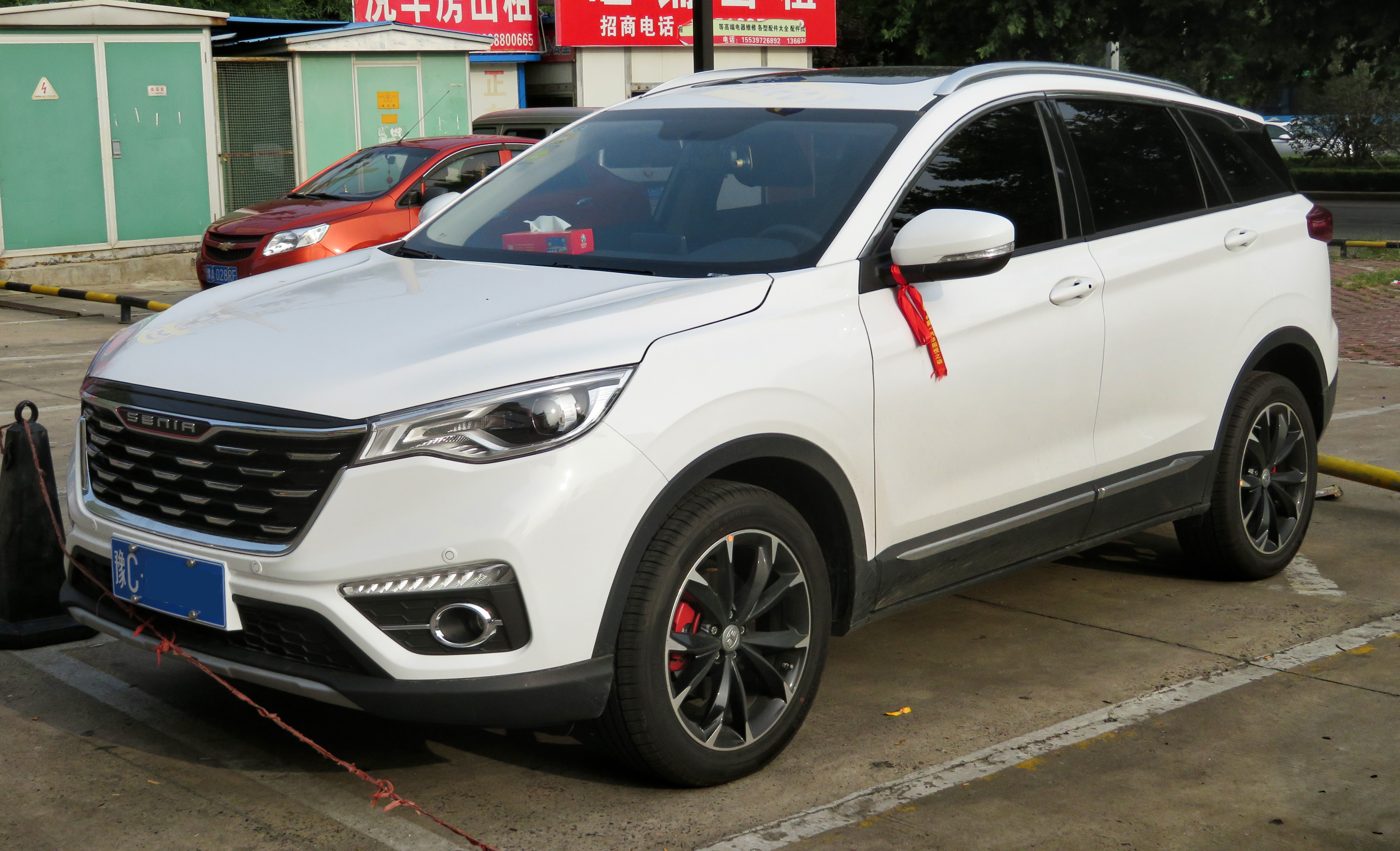
- FAW Jilin Senya R9

Overview
- Manufacturer: FAW Group - Senya
- Production: 2017–2019
- Model years: 2018–2019
- Assembly: Jilin, China

Body and chassis
- Class: Compact crossover SUV
- Body style: 4-door station wagon
- Layout: Front engine, Front-wheel drive

Powertrain
- Engine: 1.5 L turbo I4; 1.2 L turbo I4
- Transmission: 5-speed manual 6-speed automatic

Dimensions
- Wheelbase: 2,700 mm (106.3 in)
- Length: 4,505 mm (177.4 in)
- Width: 1,835 mm (72.2 in)
- Height: 1,695 mm (66.7 in)

The Senya R9 or Senia R9 is a compact crossover SUV produced by Chinese car manufacturer Senya (森雅) under the FAW Jilin subsidiary of FAW Group.

== Overview ==
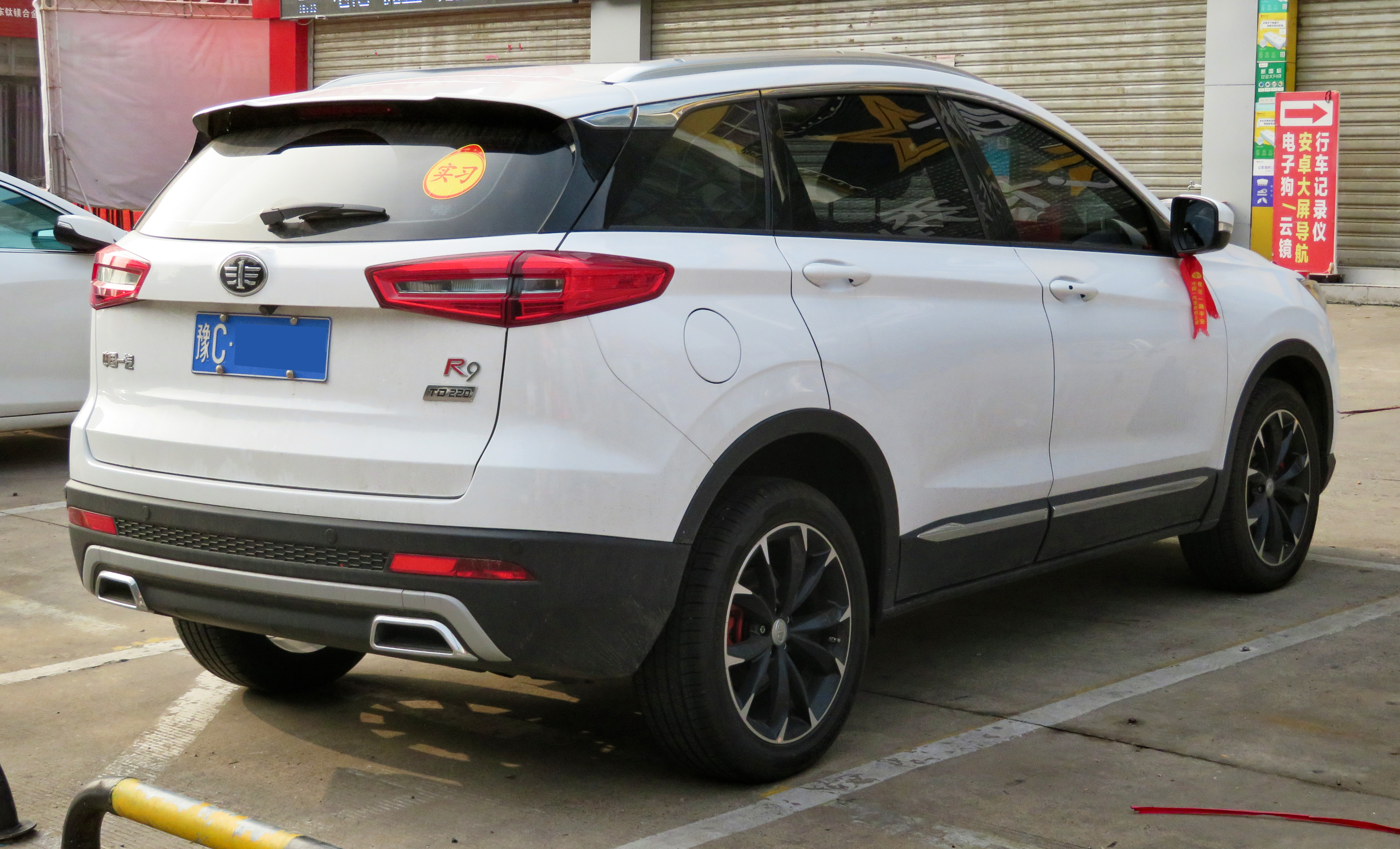
Senia R9 rear

The Senya R9 five-seater crossover was manufactured by FAW-Jilin, a FAW subsidiary based in Jilin Province. The CUV is positioned above the previously introduced Senia R7 subcompact crossover. The Senya R9 debuted in April 2018 on the 2018 Beijing Auto Show and was launched on the Chinese auto market in May 2018 with prices ranging from 83,900 to 125,900 yuan.
