= FAW Jilin =

Chinese car manufacturer

- Founded: 1980; 46 years ago
- Headquarters: Jilin City, China
- Area served: China
- Parent: Shandong Baoya Group (70.5%); FAW Group (29.5%)
- Website: www.fawmc.com

FAW Jilin (一汽吉林) is a subsidiary of the First Automobile Works and a maker of mini vehicles, small trucks and vans that see commercial use. It is located in Jilin City, Jilin province, China.

Founded in 1980, FAW purchased Jilin in 1987. Since October 2005, it was in a joint venture with Daihatsu Motor Co. of Japan, but this was dissolved in January 2010. Jilin retains production rights to the vehicles built and also retains the production facilities.

In 2019, Shandong Baoya New Energy Automotive Co., Ltd. (Baoya New Energy) acquired a 70.5% equity stake in FAW Jilin for ¥1.5 billion. Following this capital increase and expansion of shares, FAW Group's equity in FAW Jilin has been diluted from 100% to 29.50%.

== Models ==
Jilin originally built a licensed version of the 1976-1979 Suzuki Carry Wide (seventh generation), called the Jilin JL 110C/E. It was equipped with the same 797 cc four-cylinder F8A engine as used in the export version Carry ST80. Power was 35 PS (26 kW). Later, the 37 PS (27 kW) 796 cc F8B was also made available. The JL 110E was a high-roof version of the van, and there was also a JL 110G, a long-wheelbase eight-seater version with the 45 PS (33 kW) 970 cc F10A four-cylinder engine. The car was stretched by 30 cm (12 in) just behind the front door, to allow for another row of seats. It was also 15 cm (5.9 in) wider and could reach 100 km/h (62 mph).

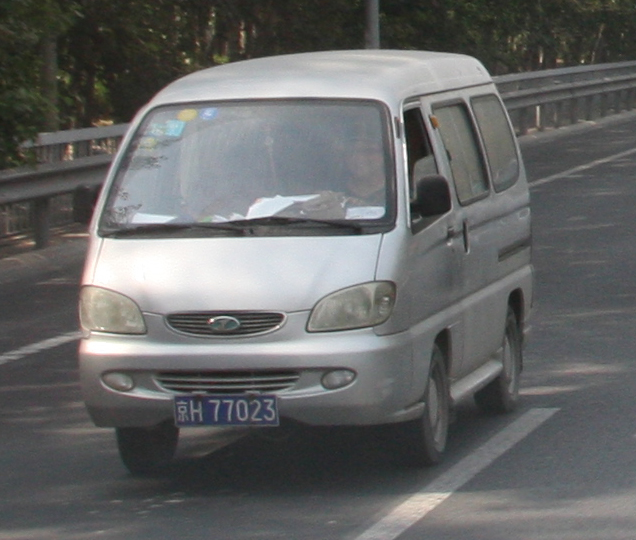
FAW Jilin Jiabao CA6361

Most of Jilin's previous products are small vans and trucks based on the ninth generation Suzuki Carry (second generation Suzuki Every). After a series of reskins, most recently the CA6360 of 2003, not much of the Suzuki heritage besides the sliding doors remains visible. The 6-seater CA6350/6361, and the four-passenger pickup version CA 1016, first appeared in 1999. The engines available are an 870 cc four-cylinder with either 38 or 44 PS (28 or 32 kW) and a 1,051 cc version with 52 PS (38 kW). The CA1010, a regular pickup version, was shown in 2003. The more modern-looking 6- to 8-seat CA 6360 is equipped with the two more powerful engines (44 or 52 PS).

The larger, more modern yet AV6 CA6371 minivan debuted at the Shanghai Motor Show in August 2005. The streamlined 5-seat minivan CA6410 has also been listed as available since the late 1990s. The Daihatsu Xenia SUV has been built by Jilin as the Jilin-Senya M80 since 2007, and at the Beijing Auto Show in May 2010 the new Senya S80 (or Xenia) was introduced. The S80 features more body cladding and equipment, justifying a somewhat higher price. The engine is a 1.5-liter four-cylinder with 75 kW (102 PS) and 140 N⋅m (103 lb⋅ft), providing a top speed of 170 km/h (106 mph). The FAW Xenia S80 was released in December 2010.

The Senya M80 was later discontinued and was replaced by the Senya R7 subcompact crossover launched on the Chinese car market in the first quarter of 2016 sharing platforms with the Besturn X40. From 2018, the Senya family changed its name to Senia. A larger Senia R9 compact crossover followed later and debuted on the 2018 Beijing Auto Show and was launched on the Chinese car market in May 2018.

== Current Products ==
- Jinbao V52/V55
- Jinbao V75/V77
- Jiabao V80
- Jiabao T51 (Based on the Jiefang/Jiebao CA6360)
- Jiabao T50/T57 (Based on the V52/V55)
- Jiefang T80/T90 (Based on the Jiabao V80)
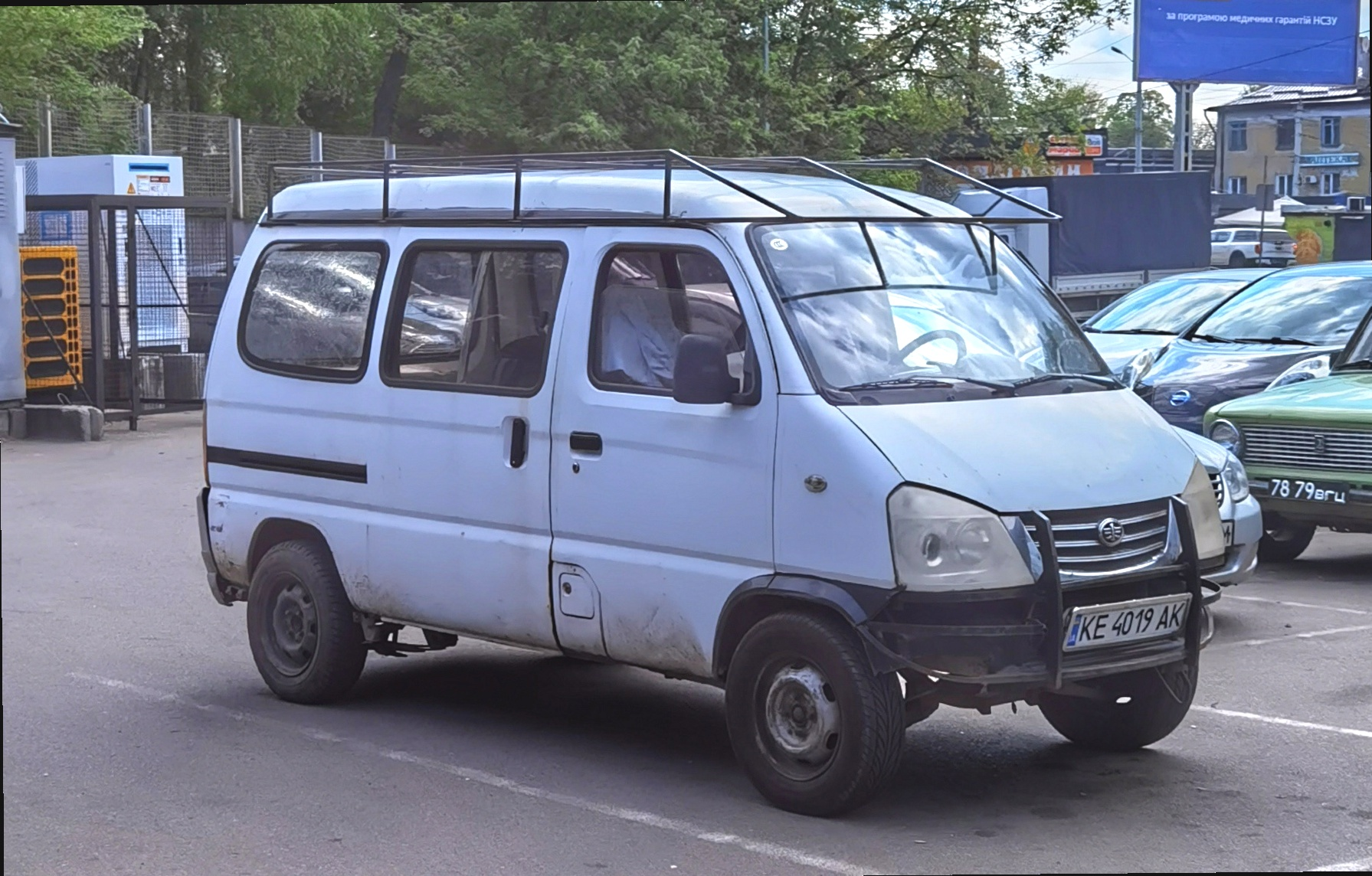
FAW Jilin 6371

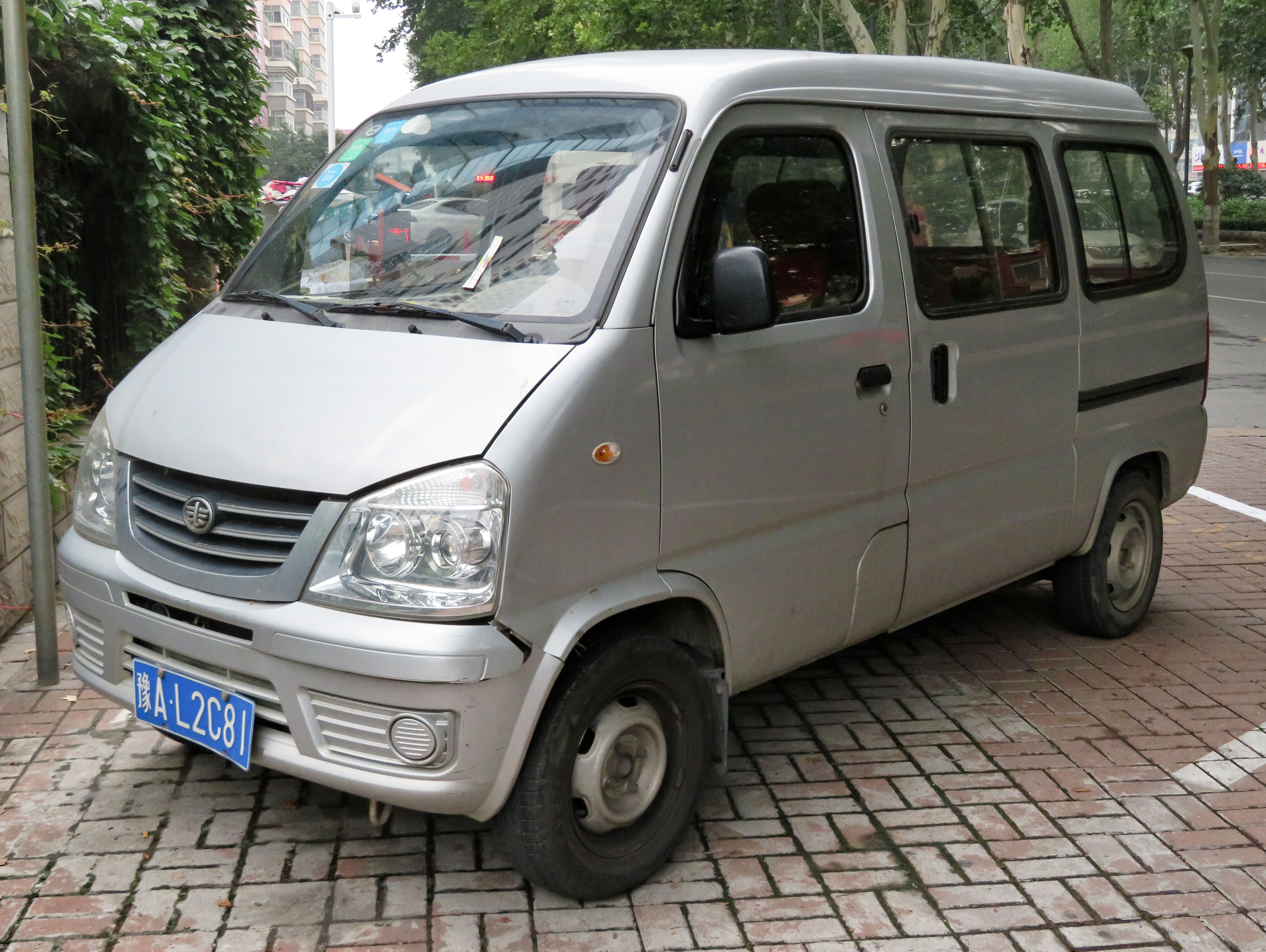
FAW Jilin V52

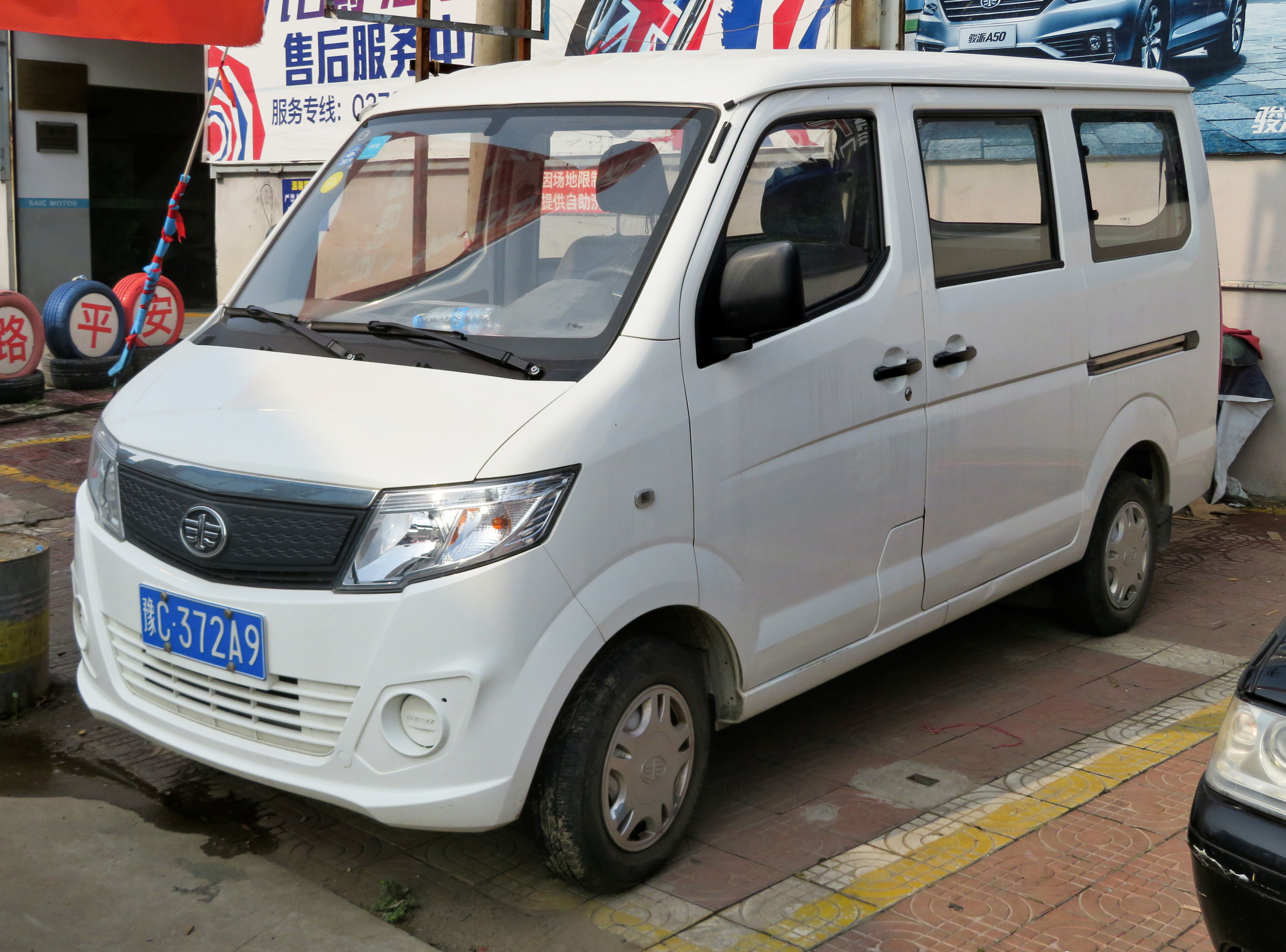
FAW Jilin Jiabao V77

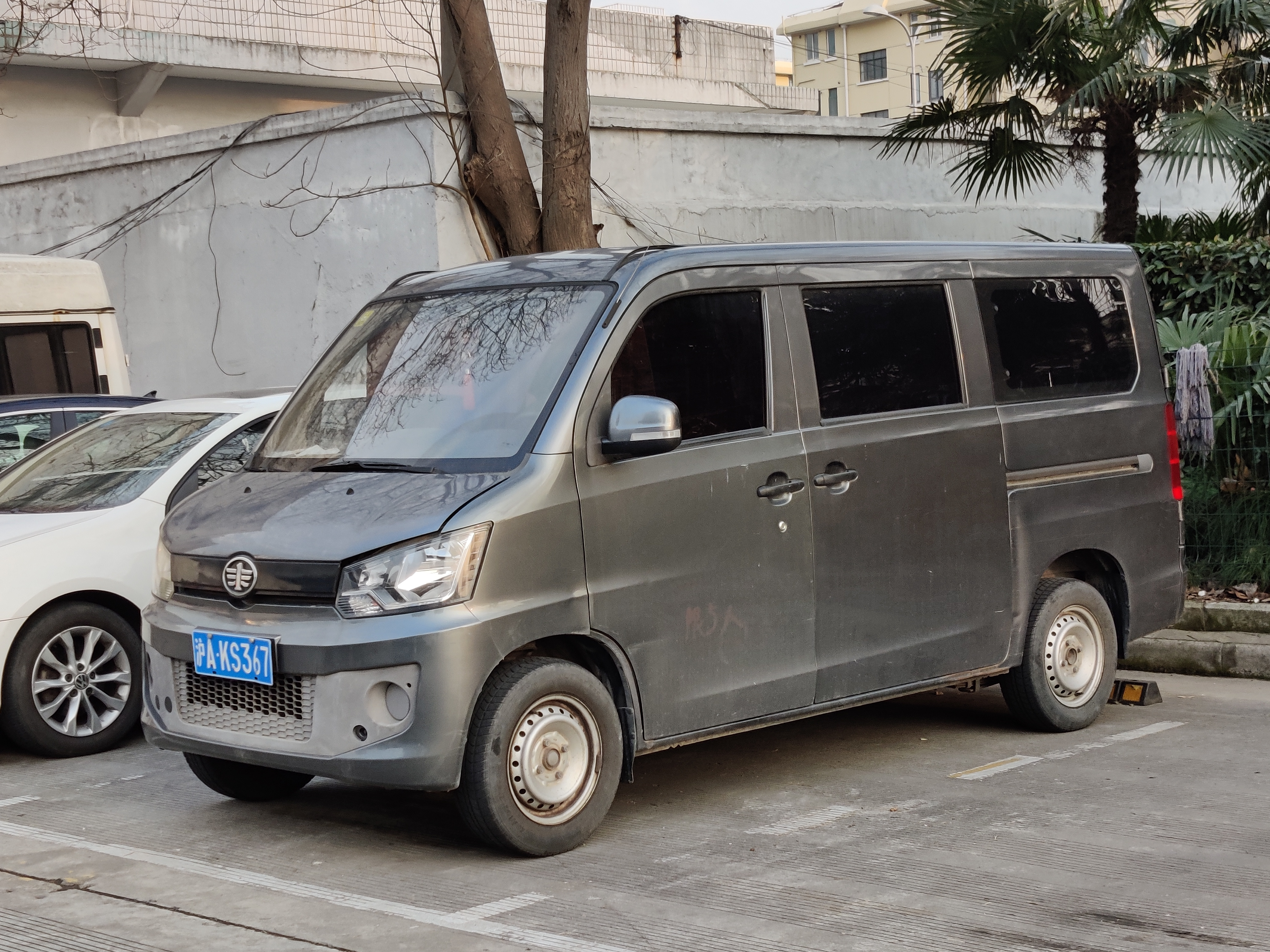
FAW Jilin Jiabao V80

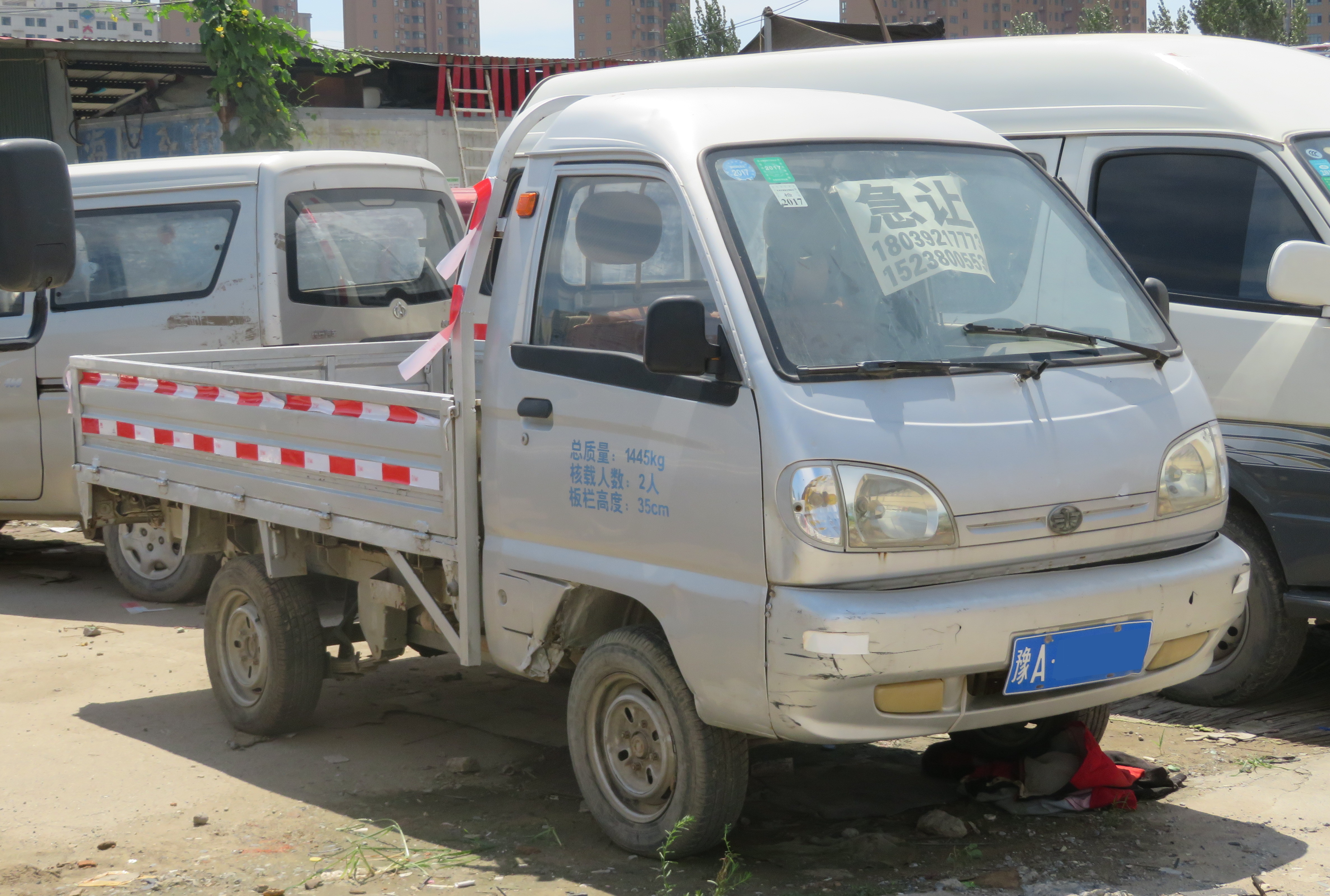
FAW Jilin Jiabao T51

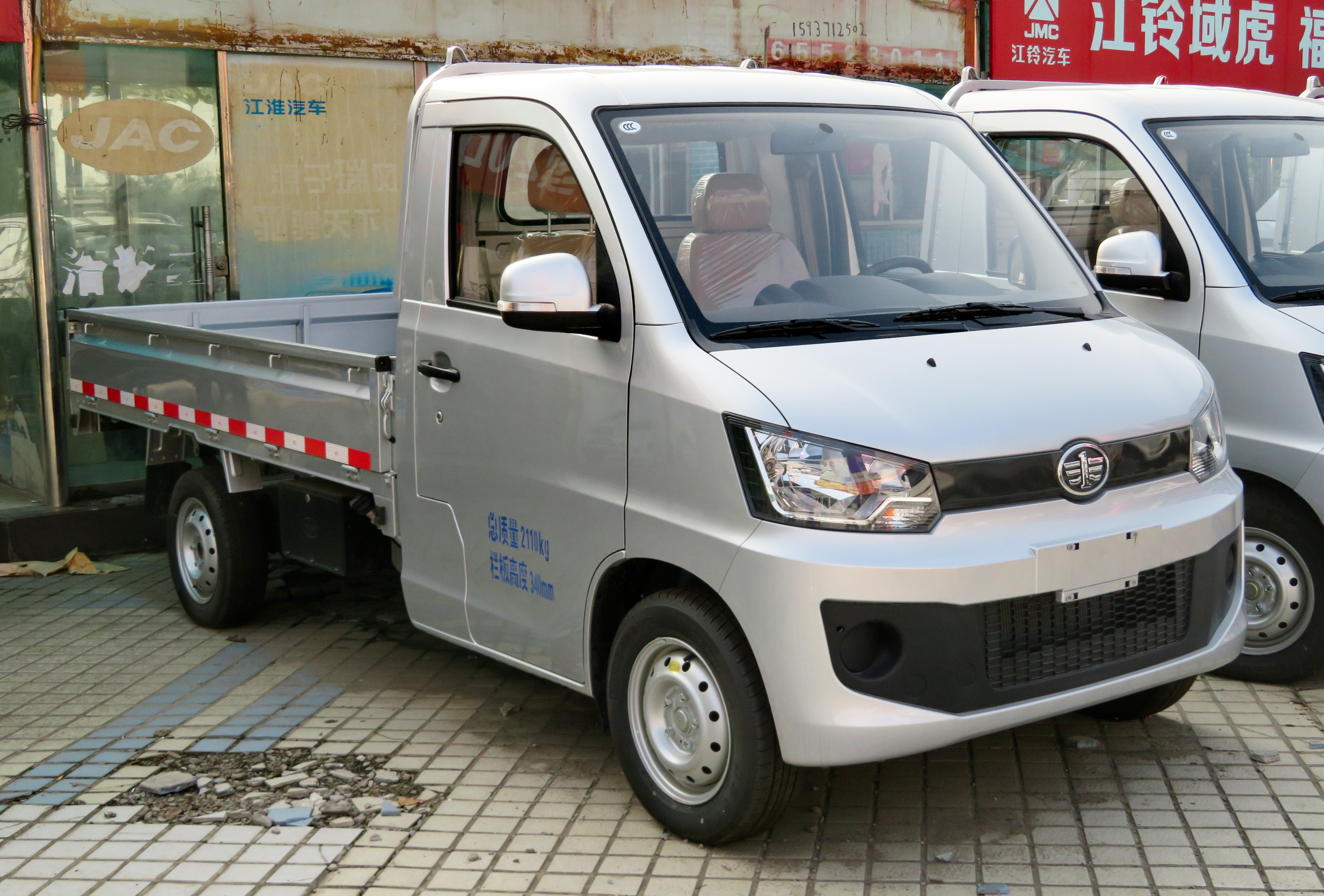
FAW Jilin Jiabao T80

== Discontinued Products ==
- Senya S80
- Senya M80
- Senia R7
- Senia R7 C
- Senia R8
- Senia R9
- Jiabao V70
- Jiefang CA6361
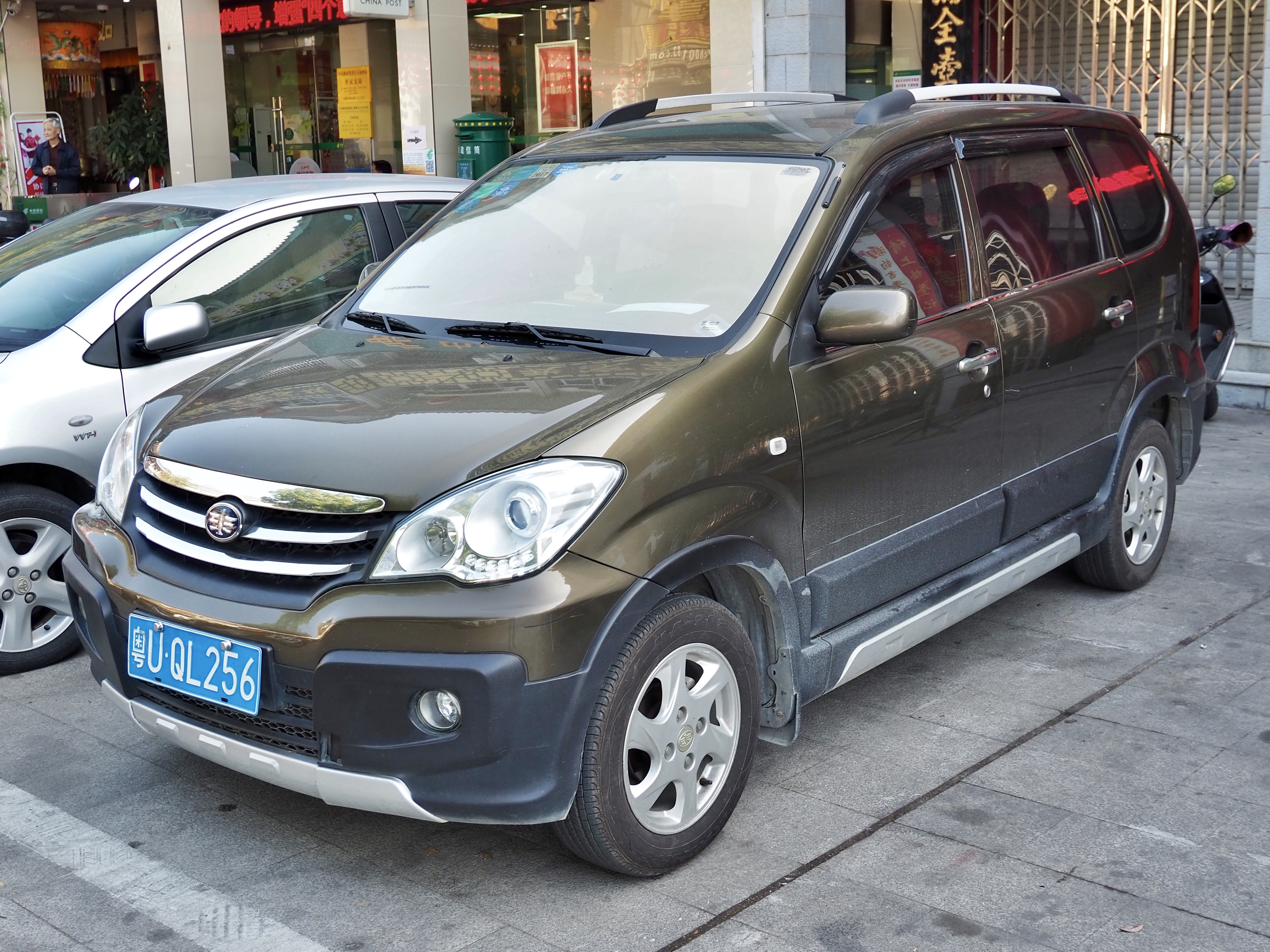
FAW Jilin Senya S80

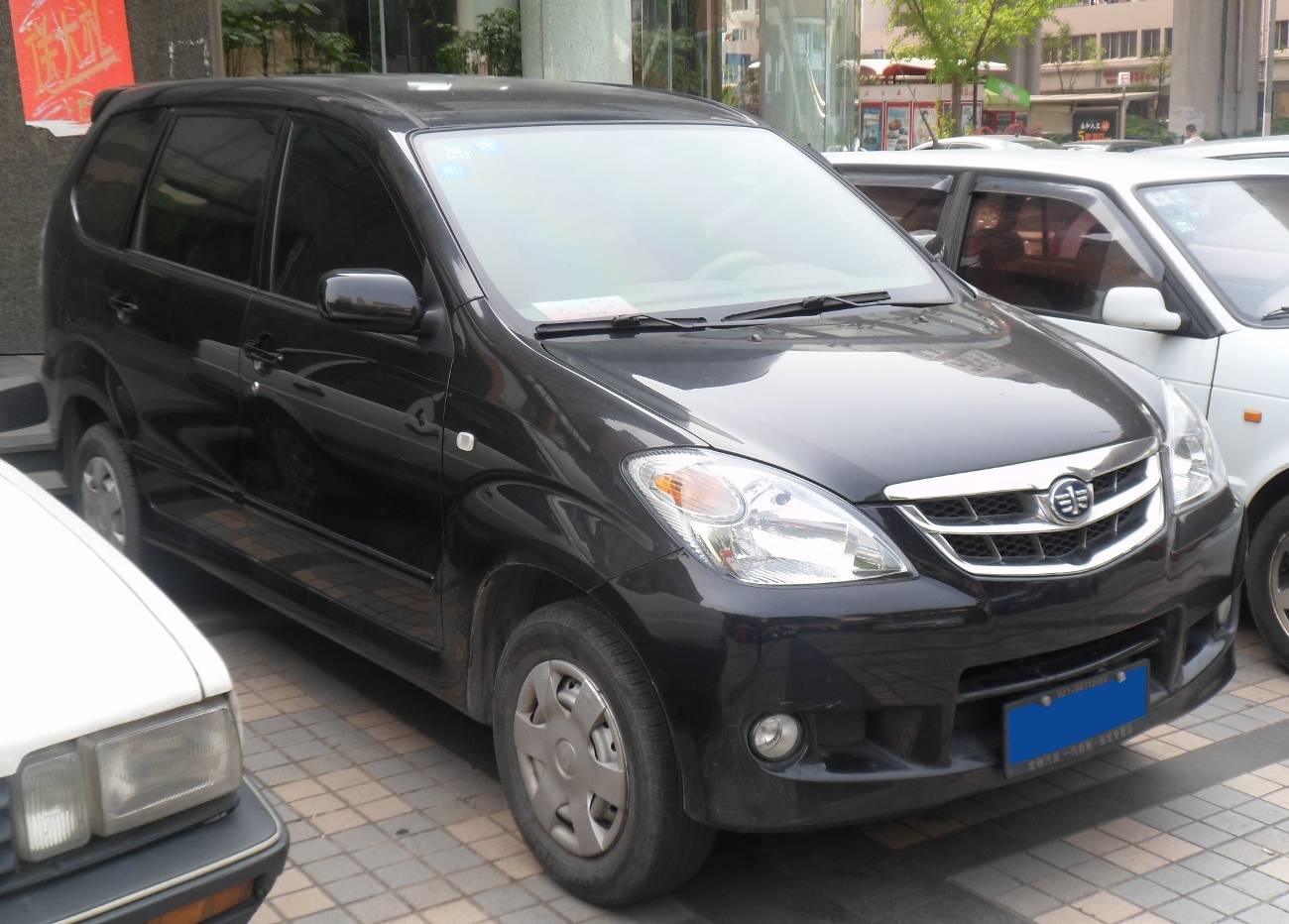
FAW Jilin Senya M80

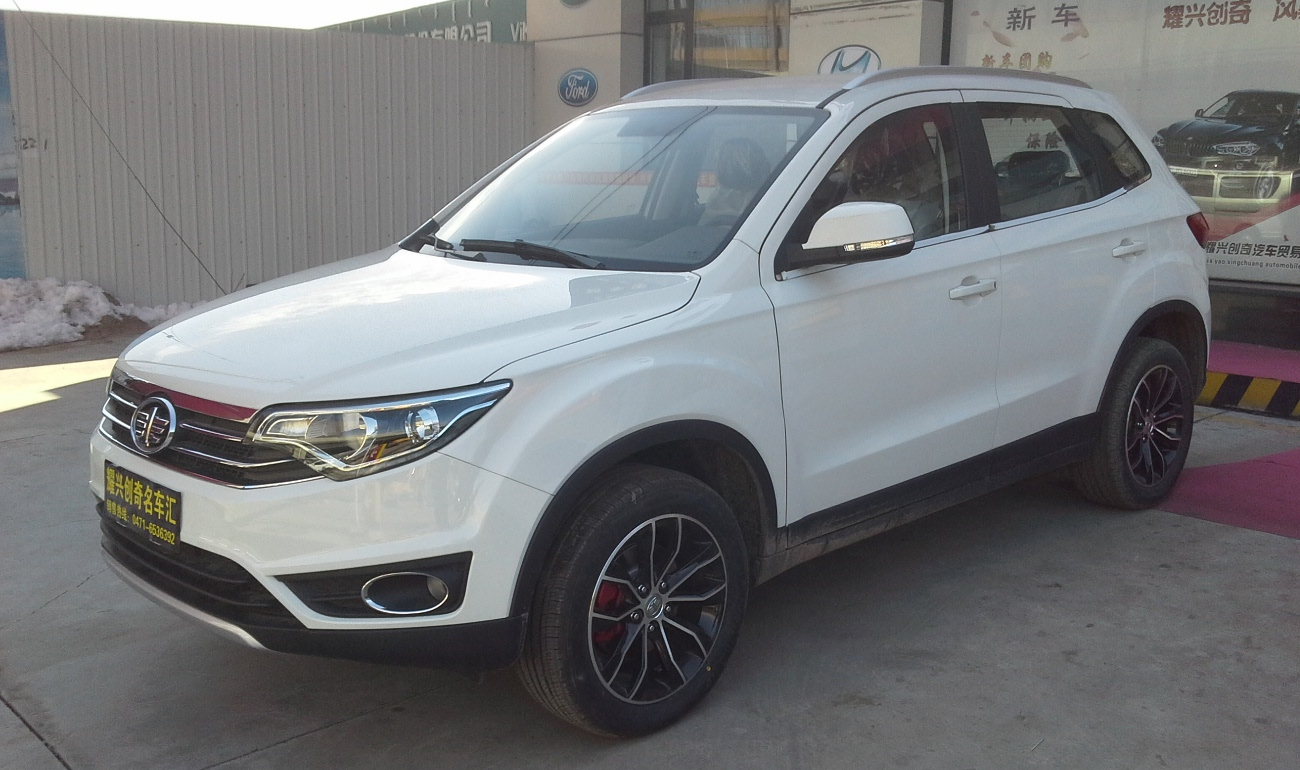
FAW Jilin Senia R7

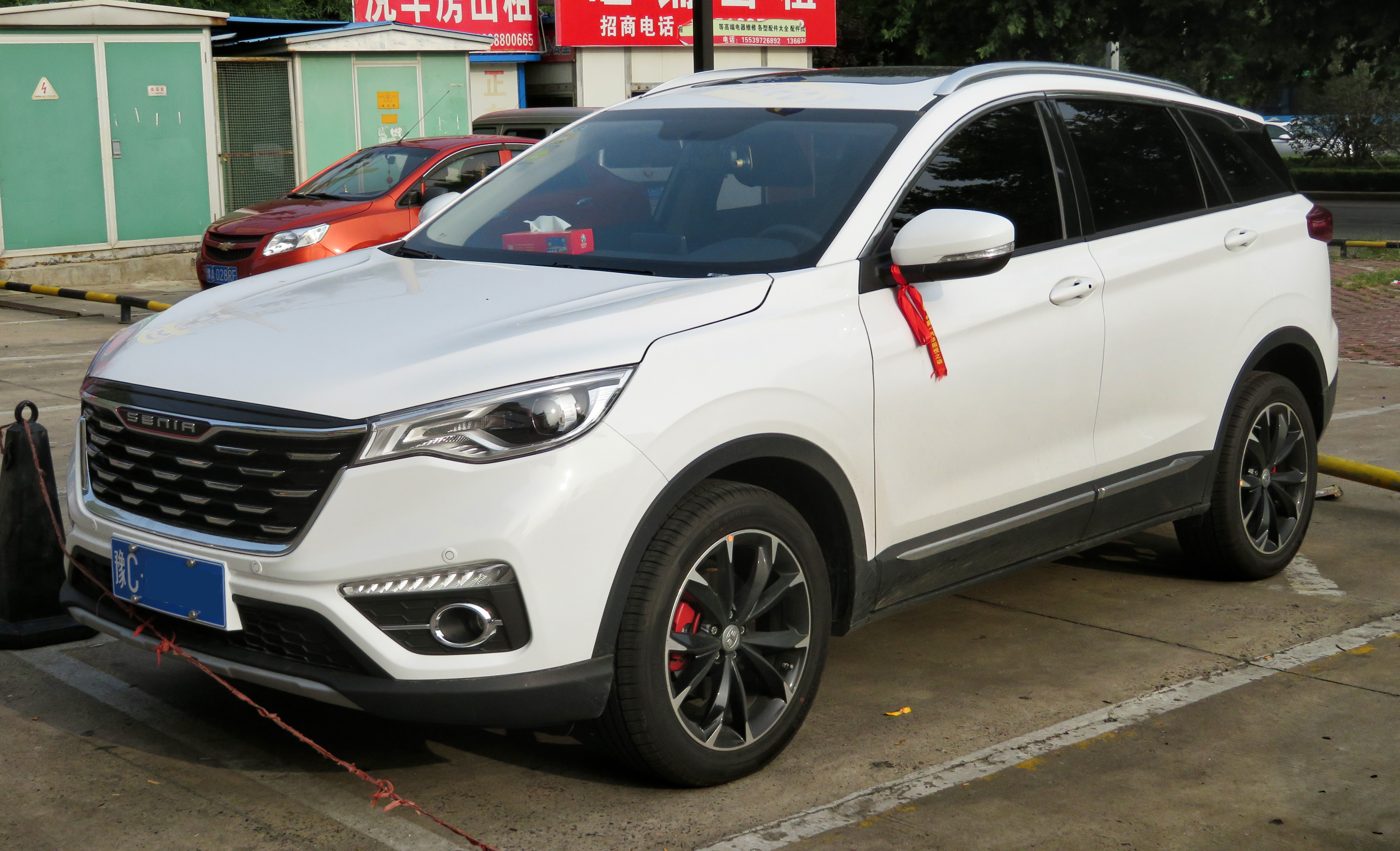
FAW Jilin Senia R9

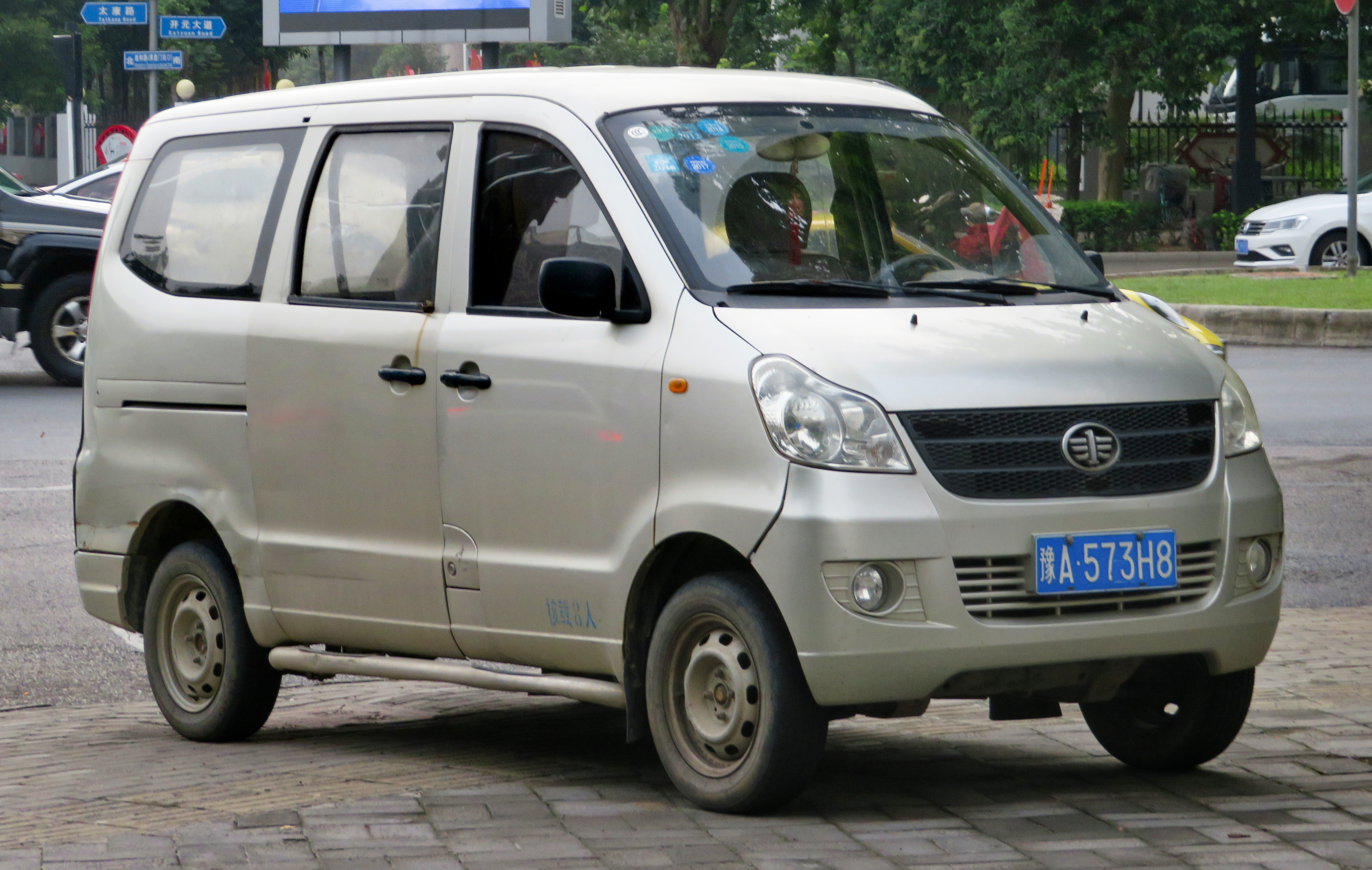
FAW Jilin Jiabao V70

== Production bases and facilities ==
FAW Jilin has at least one production base, and two more are planned.
