= Bestune X40 =

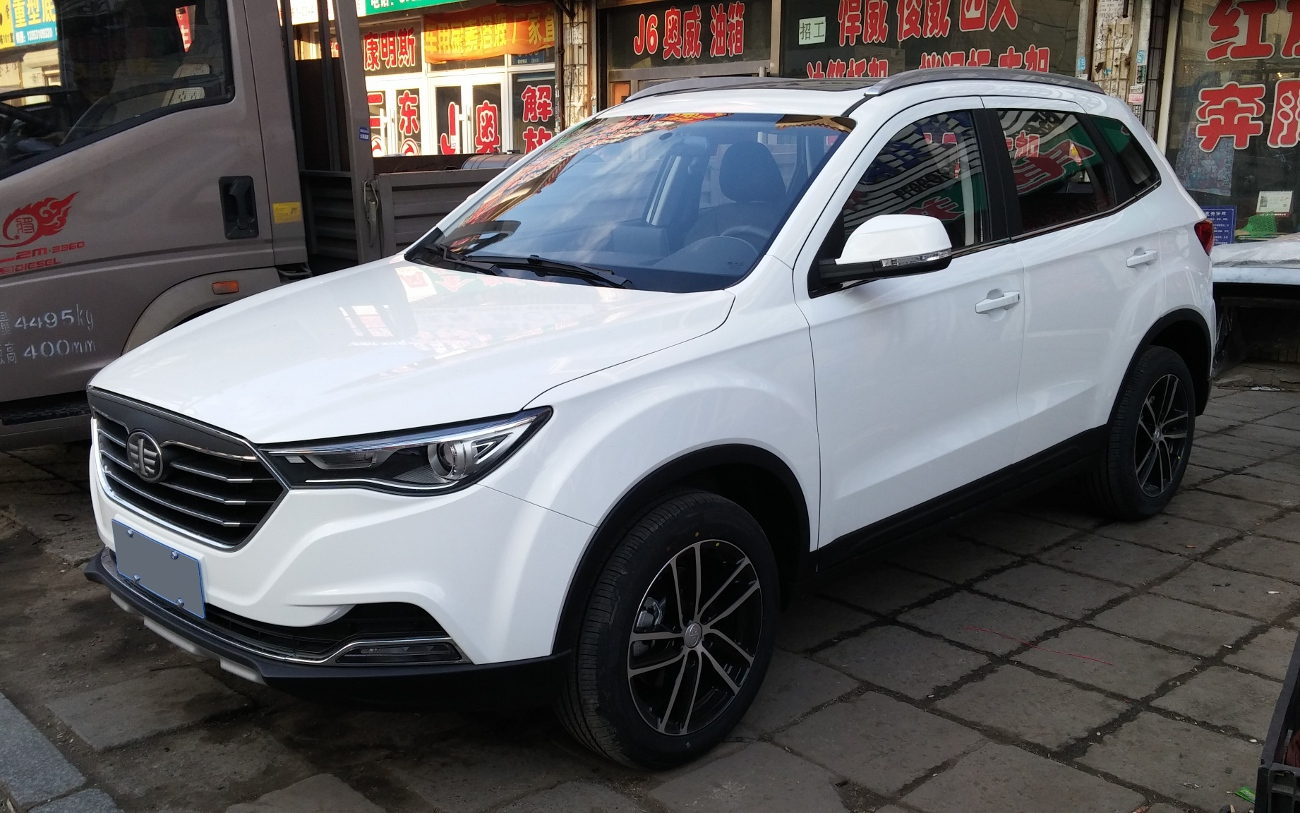

Overview
- Manufacturer: FAW Group - Besturn
- Also called: Besturn X40
- Production: 2016–2019
- Model years: 2017–2020
- Assembly: Changchun, China

Body and chassis
- Class: Compact crossover SUV (C)
- Body style: 4-door station wagon
- Layout: Front engine, Front-wheel drive
- Related: Senya R7; Besturn T33

Powertrain
- Engine: 1.6 L CA4GB16 I4
- Transmission: 5-speed manual 6-speed automatic

Dimensions
- Wheelbase: 2,600 mm (102.4 in)
- Length: 4,310 mm (169.7 in)
- Width: 1,780 mm (70.1 in)
- Height: 1,680 mm (66.1 in)

Chronology
- Successor: Bestune T33

The Bestune X40 is a compact crossover SUV produced by the Chinese car manufacturer Besturn FAW Group.

== Overview ==
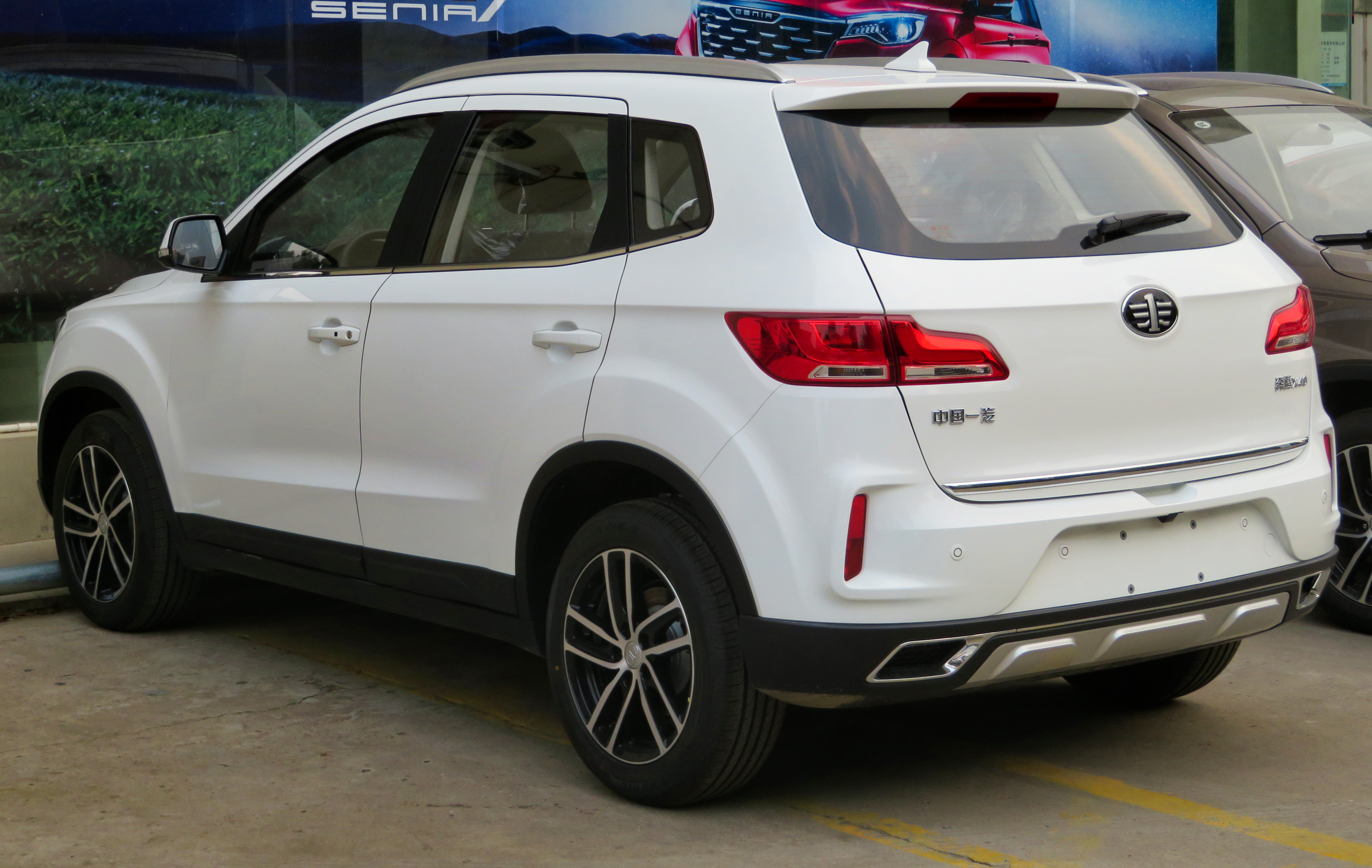
Besturn X40 rear

The X40 is a five-seater CUV that was presented for the first time at the Guangzhou Auto Show in November 2016, shortly after the market launch took place. The CUV is almost identical to the previously introduced Senia R7.

The X40 is powered by a 1.6-litre inline-4 engine producing 114 hp and 155Nm, with the engine mated to a 6-speed automatic transmission. The Besturn X40 come standard as a FWD vehicle.

The X40 is equipped with the advanced intelligent connective system D-life in China and is featured with social function. The D-Life system is an intelligent terminal in the vehicle that can be customized with various online applications.

== Bestune X40 EV400/EV460 ==
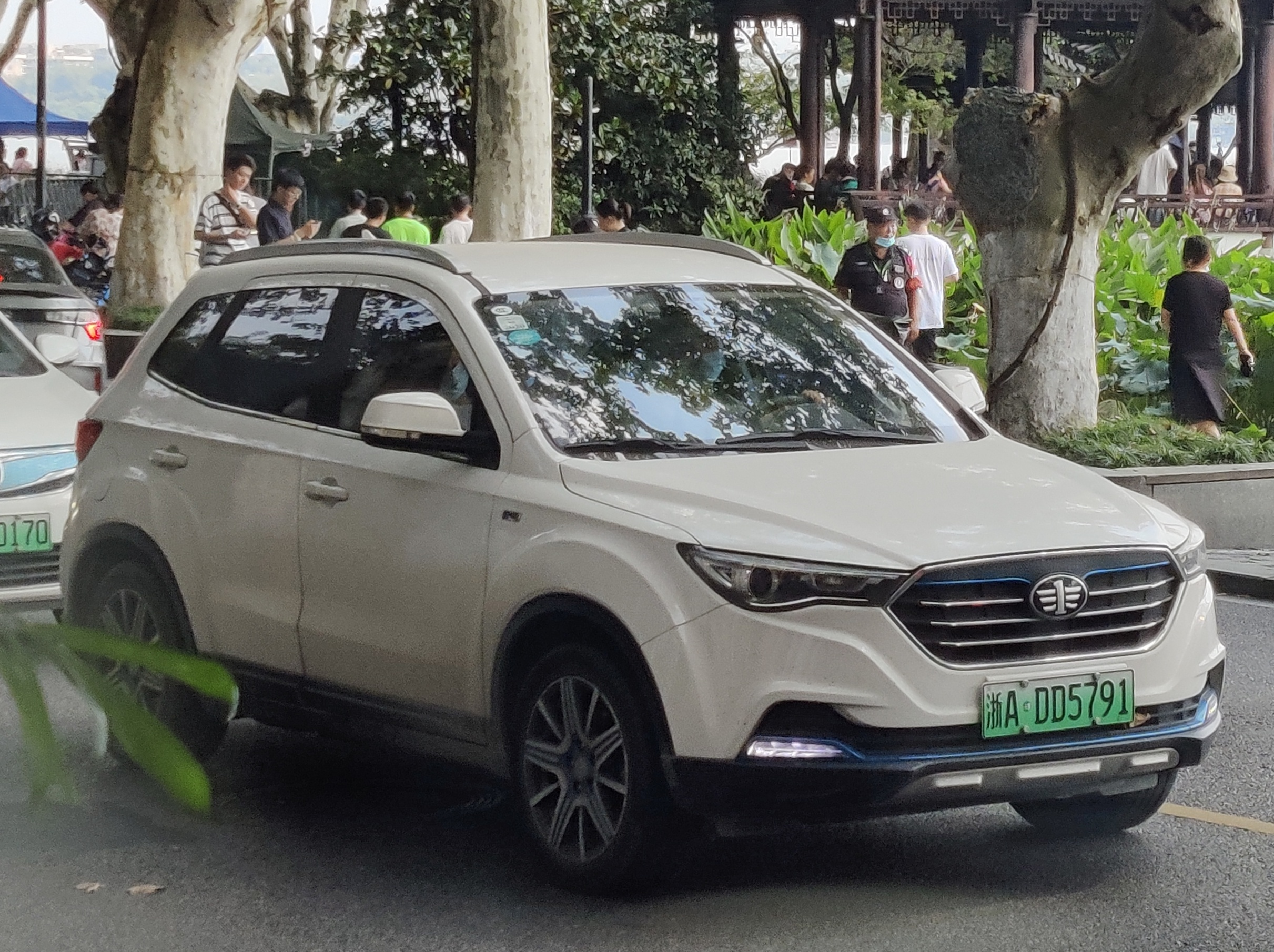
Besturn X40 EV

The Bestune X40 EV400 and EV460 is the electric variants of the Bestune X40 crossover. The EV400 model was launched alongside the 2019 model year X40 on September 19, 2018. The EV460 variant was launched at the 2018 Guangzhou Auto Show in November 2018, and deliveries started in December 2019.

=== Battery and powertrain ===
The EV460 is equipped with a 52.5 kWh battery delivering a NEDC range of 352 km (220 miles). The energy density of the battery pack of the Besturn X40 EV460 is 146.4Wh/kg, and the battery has an 8-year or 120,000 km (75,000 miles) warranty.

The powertrain of the Besturn X40 EV460 produces 188 hp (140 kW ), and 320 N.m (236 lb.ft) of torque. The top speed of the 2019 Besturn X40 EV460 is 160 km/h (100 mph). Based on the NEDC driving cycle the energy consumption of the 2019 Besturn X40 EV460 SUV is 15.2 kWh/100 km.
