= Senia R7 =

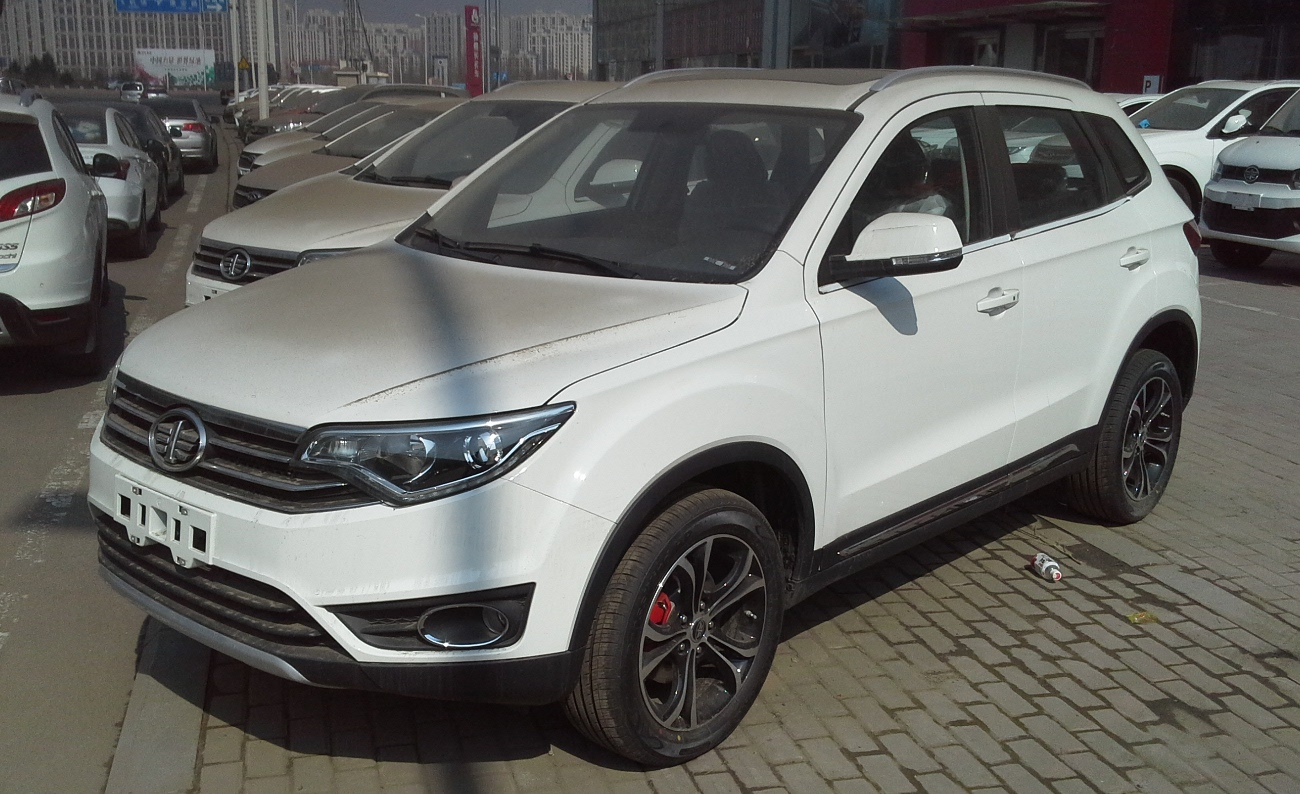
- FAW Jilin Senia R7

Overview
- Manufacturer: FAW Group - Senya
- Also called: Naenara SUV (North Korea)
- Production: December 2015–2018
- Assembly: Jilin, China; Karachi, Pakistan

Body and chassis
- Class: Subcompact crossover SUV
- Body style: 5-door station wagon
- Layout: Front-engine, front-wheel-drive
- Related: Besturn T33; Besturn X40

Powertrain
- Engine: 1.6 L I4; 1.8 L I4
- Transmission: 5-speed manual 6-speed automatic

Dimensions
- Wheelbase: 2,590 mm (102.0 in)
- Length: 4,300 mm (169.3 in)
- Width: 1,780 mm (70.1 in)
- Height: 1,650 mm (65.0 in)

The FAW Senia R7 is a subcompact crossover SUV produced by Chinese car manufacturer Senia (森雅) under the FAW Jilin subsidiary of FAW Group.

== Overview ==
The Senia R7, five-seater crossover, was manufactured by FAW-Jilin, a subsidiary of FAW Group based in Jilin Province. The CUV is almost identical to the later introduced Besturn X40 based on the same platform.

The FAW Senia R7 crossover SUV has been through four names across different FAW brands during its development process including the FAW R020, the FAW R20, and the Junpai D80.

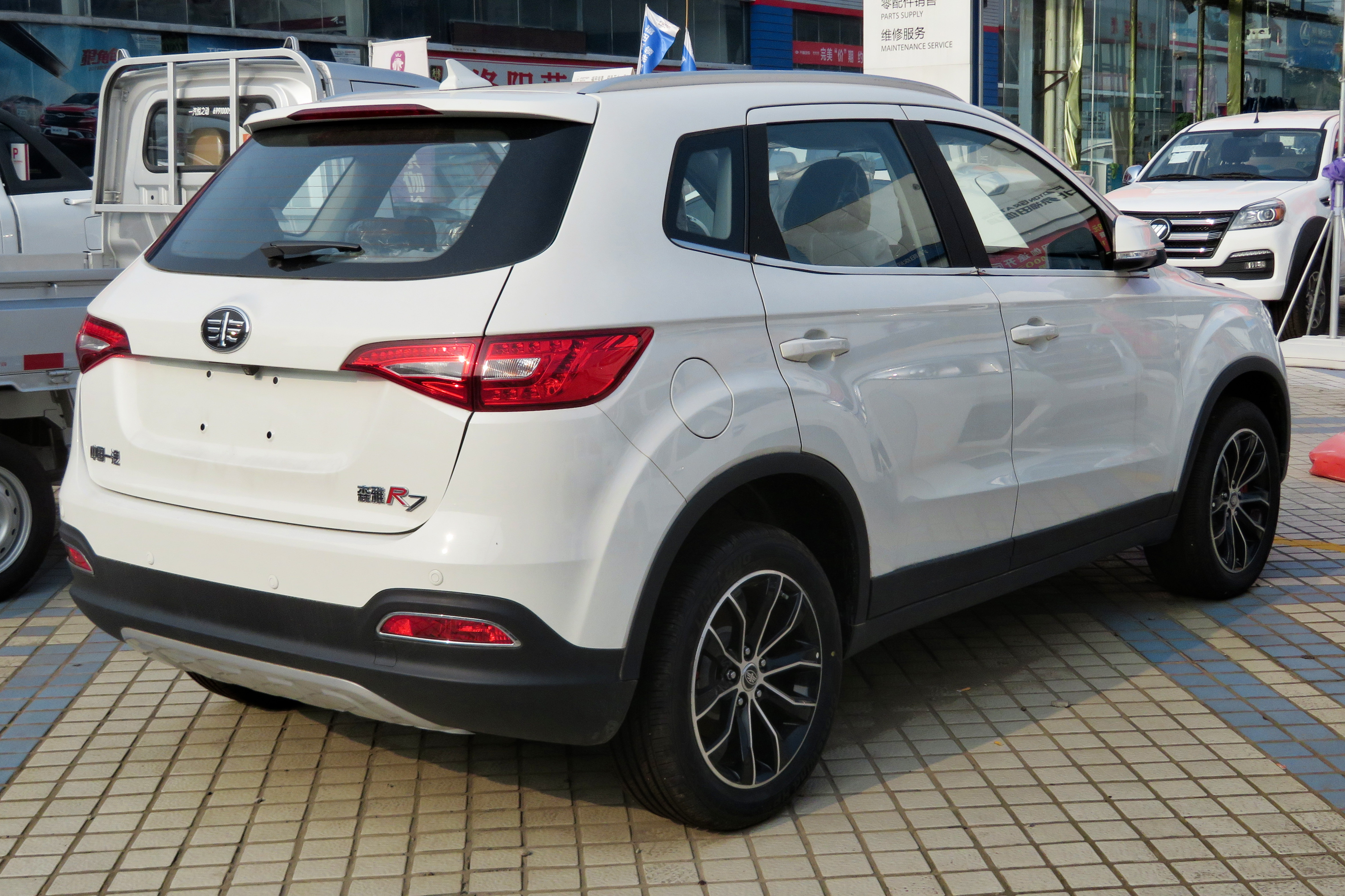
Senia R7 rear

=== Powertrain ===
The Senia R7 powertrain offers an option of 1.6-liter and 1.5-liter turbo engines, with maximum power figures of 116 and 150 hp (85 and 110 kW) respectively. The engines are mated to a 5-speed manual transmission or 6-speed automatic transmission.

=== 2018 facelift ===
During the 2018 Beijing Auto Show, the Senia R7 City was revealed previewing a direction for the upcoming facelift.

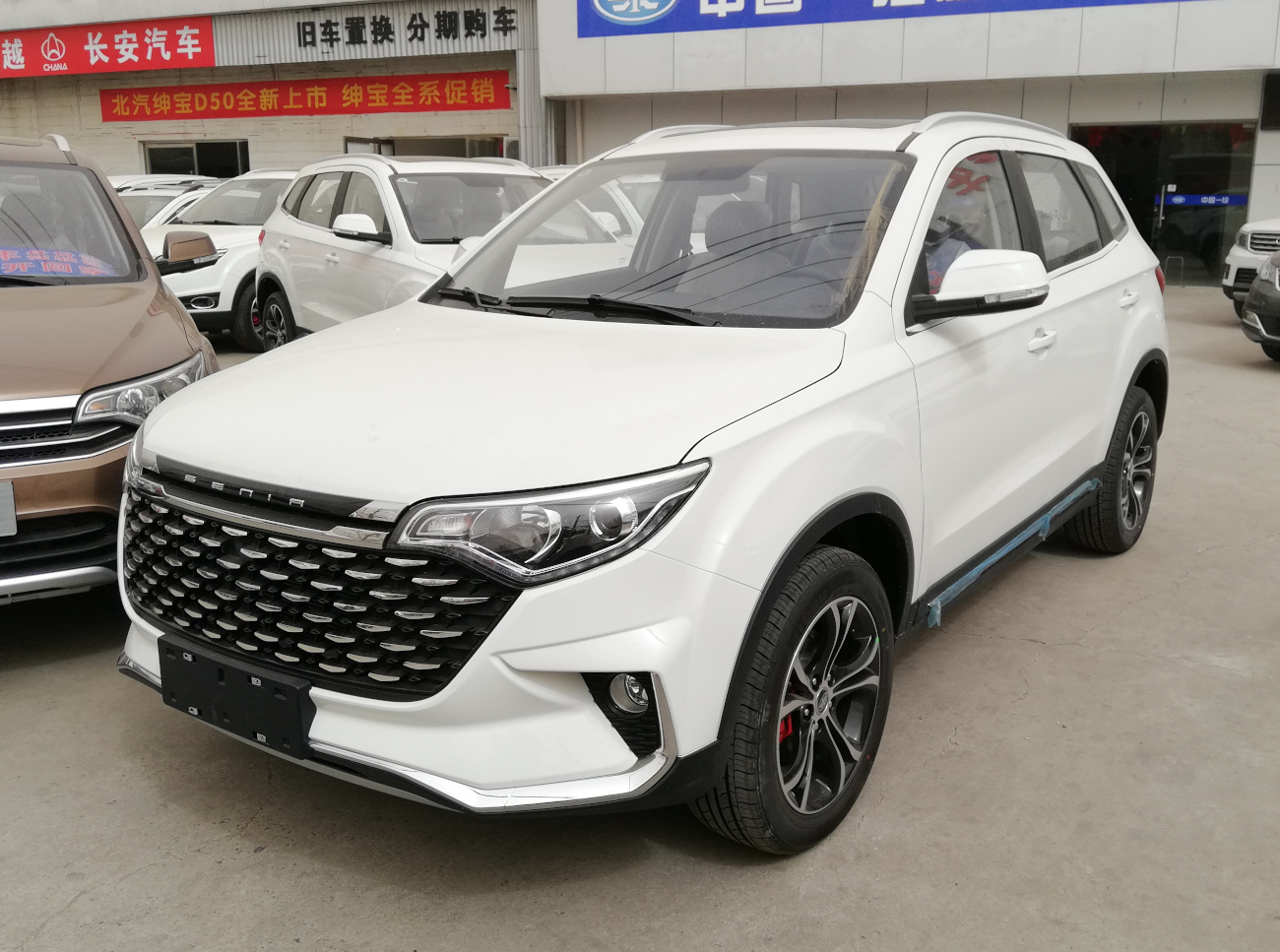
FAW Senia R7 City front

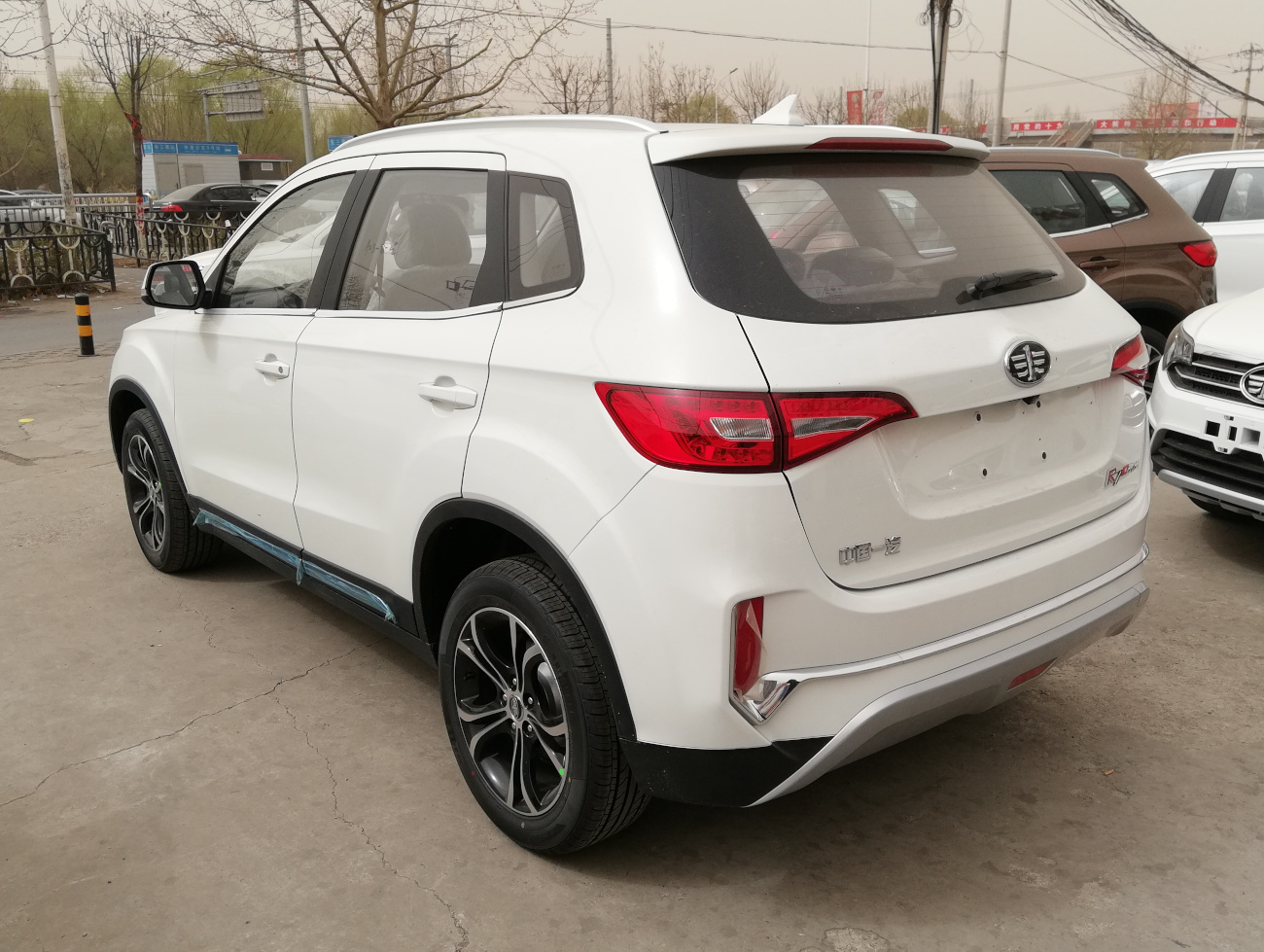
FAW Senia R7 City rear
