= Jiabao V70 =

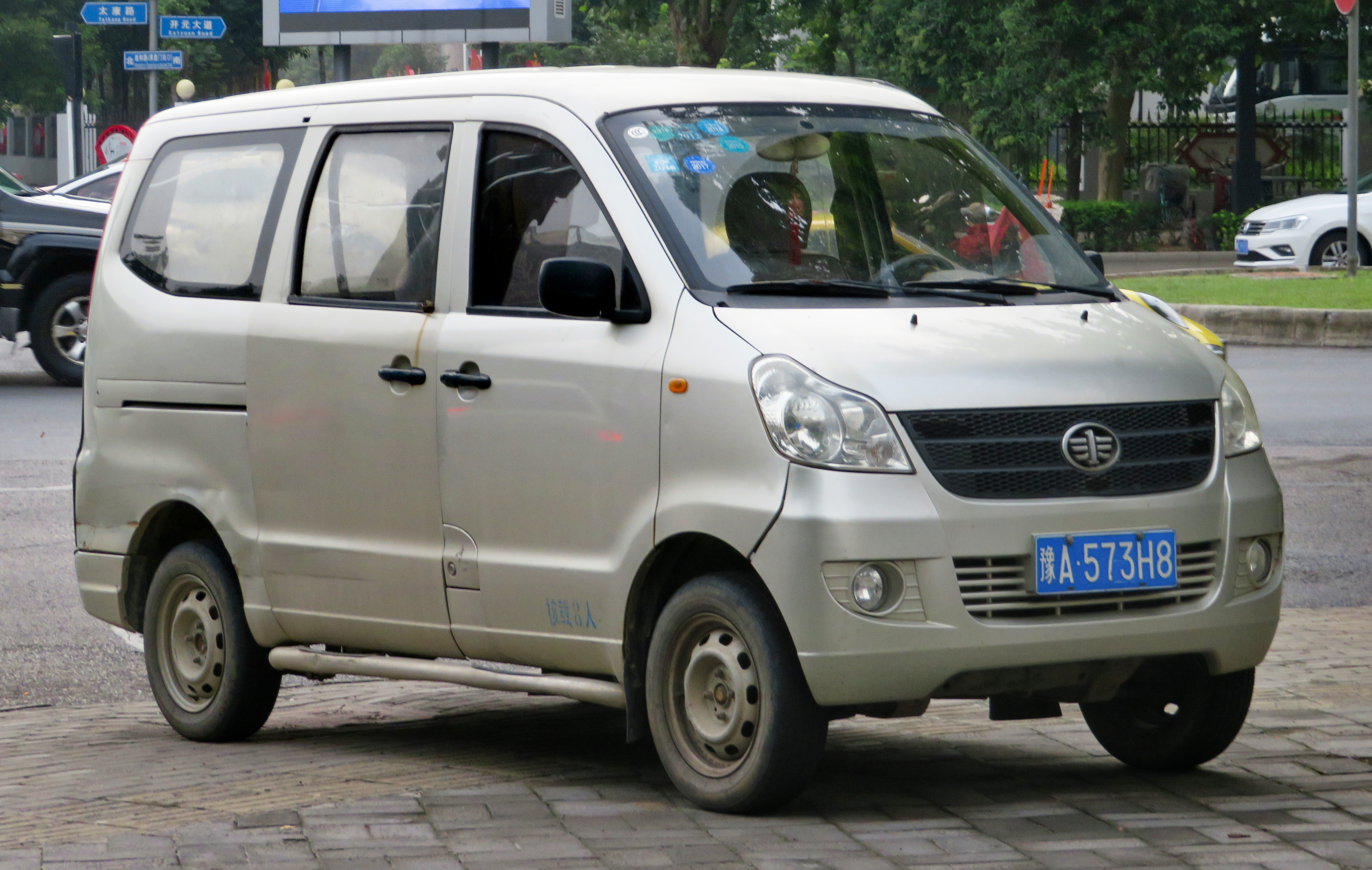

Overview
- Manufacturer: FAW Jilin (FAW Group)
- Production: 2009-2015

Body and chassis
- Class: Microvan
- Body style: Microvan

Powertrain
- Engine: 1.0L I4; 1.3L I4
- Transmission: 5 speed manual

Dimensions
- Wheelbase: 2,500 mm (98.4 in)
- Length: 3,930 mm (154.7 in)
- Width: 1,585 mm (62.4 in)
- Height: 1,857 mm (73.1 in)

Chronology
- Successor: Jiabao V75

The Jiabao V70 is a five- to eight-seater Microvan made by FAW Jilin under the Jiabao sub-brand.

== Overview ==
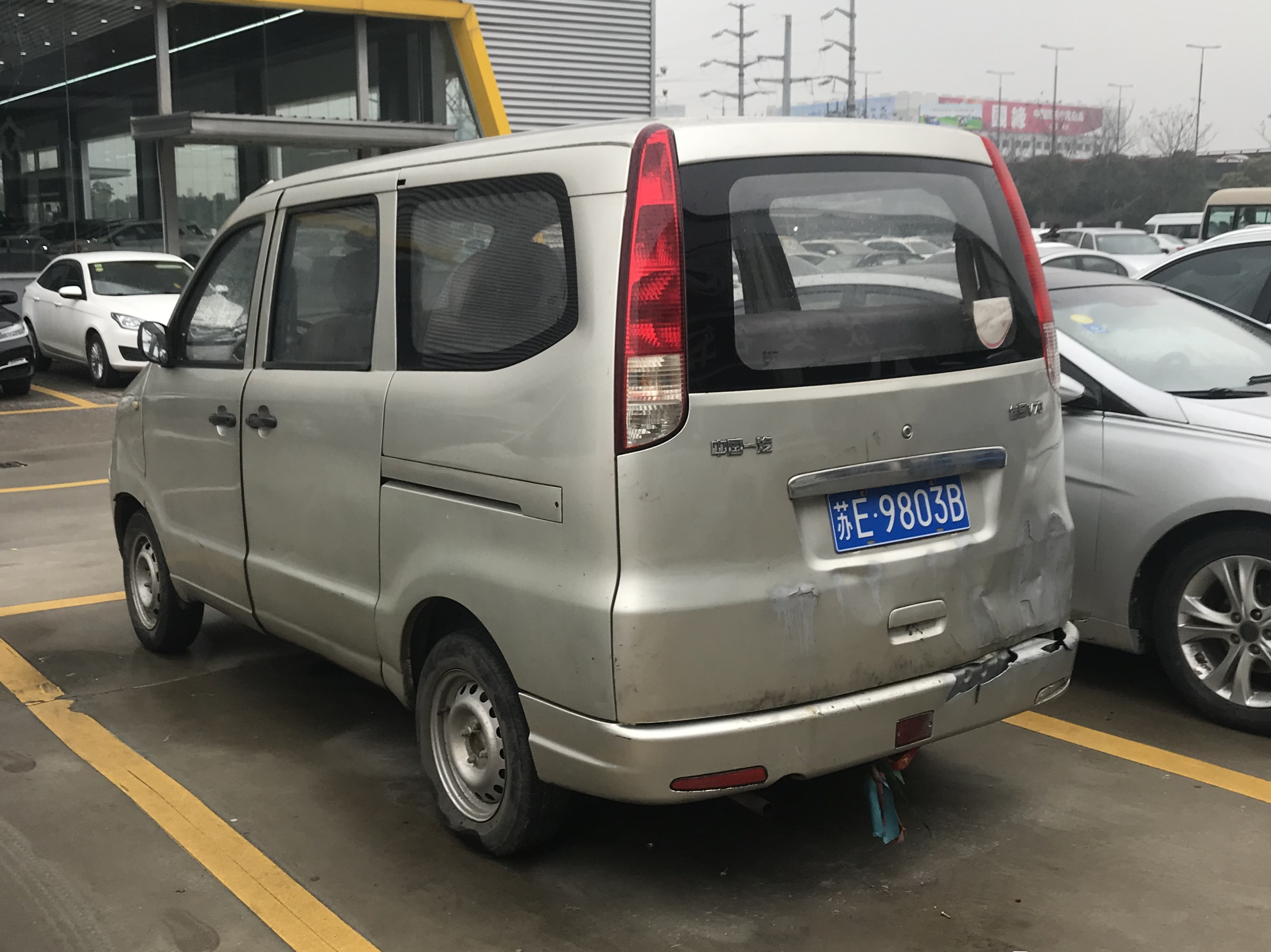
FAW Jiabao V70 rear

The FAW Jiabao V70 was originally launched in 2009 and received several updates, including a second generation that is essentially the same model with no obvious visual changes.

The first generation Jiabao V70 update model sold from 2011 to 2012 was priced between 36,200 yuan and 48,800 yuan before discontinuation.

Launched in 2012, the second generation Jiabao V70 was powered by either a 1.0 liter Inline-four petrol engine or a 1.3 liter Inline-four petrol engine, with both engine passing the Euro IV emissions standard. The Jiabao V70 was priced between 34,900 yuan and 50,900 yuan before discontinuation.
