= Al Haj FAW Motors =

Pakistani automobile manufacturer

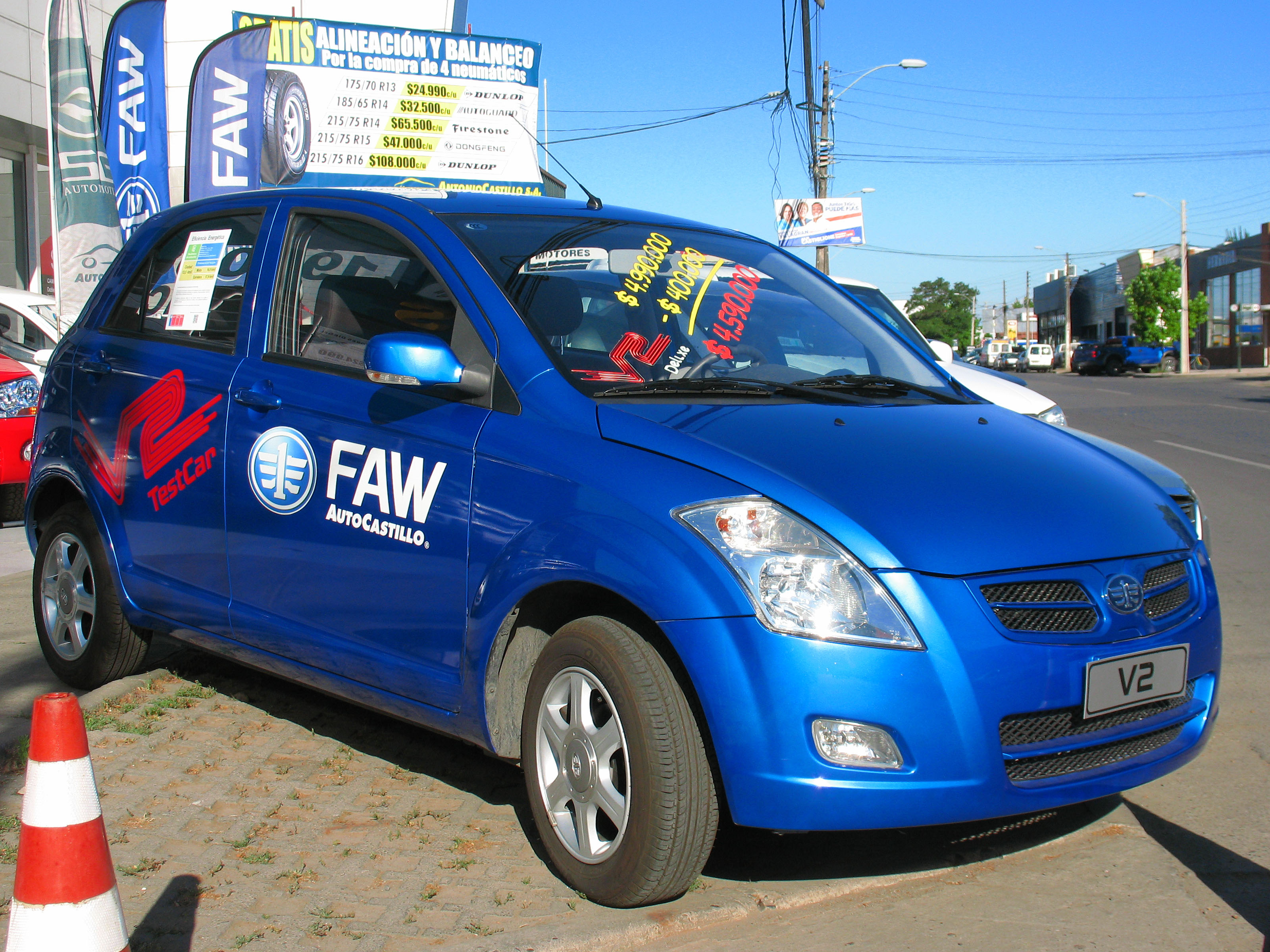
- FAW V2
- Industry: Automotive
- Founded: 2006
- Headquarters: Karachi, Pakistan
- Area served: Pakistan
- Parent: bestway automotive
- Website: Official website

AL-HAJ FAW Motors PVT. LTD.(Urdu: الحاج فا موٹرز) is a Pakistani automobile manufacturer based in Karachi, Pakistan since 2013. It is a subsidiary of Chinese assembler and manufacturer of FAW Group. The company assembles passenger and commercial vehicles at its assembly plant in Karachi.

Al-Haj FAW Motors Limited was incorporated as a private limited company in October 2006.

Al-Haj FAW Motors is the sole distributor & progressive manufacturer / assembler of FAW heavy commercial vehicles, light commercial vehicles & passenger cars in Pakistan.

First CBU (Complete Built-Up) product-line of HVs was launched in 2006 which included different heavy commercial vehicles like dump trucks, rigid trucks & prime movers.

The local production CKD (Complete Knocked-Down) of FAW Heavy Commercial Vehicles started in December 2011.

Light Vehicles, Mini Van & Pickup (CBU) were introduced in March 2012 and regular (CKD) production of minivans (XPV) and pick-up trucks (Carrier) was started in September 2012.

In year 2014, Al-Haj FAW Motors launched Pakistan’s first locally assembled Chinese passenger car, the FAW V2.

== Operations in Pakistan ==
FAW used to manufacture a wide range of vehicles to cater to all transportation needs, including passenger cars. The Al-Haj group had introduced FAW's heavy-duty trucks as completely built-up units (CBUs) initially. The response from transporters was positive, so the range of trucks was expanded to meet the needs of all cargo segments, including medium and light-duty commercial vehicles.

In 2017, JS Bank Limited collaborated with Al-Haj FAW Motors Private Limited to provide business loans to customers of light commercial vehicles through the Prime Minister Youth Business Loan (PMYBL) scheme.

== Products ==
=== Passenger vehicles ===
- FAW V2 (Subcompact city car)
- FAW XP-V (Minivan)

=== Commercial vehicles ===
- FAW Carrier (Light Truck)
- FAW Tiger V (Medium Truck)
- FAW Super Plus J5M (Heavy Truck)
- FAW Tornado J5P (Heavy Truck)
