= Tianjin FAW =

Tianjin-based FAW Group subsidiary

Tianjin FAW Xiali Automobile Co., Ltd.
- Formerly: Xiali (1997–2008)
- Type: Public
- Industry: Automotive
- Founded: 1965; 61 years ago (company)
- Defunct: December 14, 2020
- Fate: All assets absorbed into FAW Group, listed shell company transferred to China Railway Materials
- Successor: FAW Group
- Headquarters: Tianjin, China
- Area served: China
- Products: Automobiles
- Parent: FAW Group
- Subsidiaries: Tianjin FAW Toyota Motor Co., Ltd. (30%); Tom Group(24%) Tianjin Tom Mitsubishi Fuso (36%); Mitsubishi Motors (42%); Mitsubishi Fuso Truck And Bus Corporation (50%).
- Website: www.tjfaw.com (in Chinese)

Tianjin FAW Xiali Automobile Co., Ltd. was an automobile company based in Tianjin, China and a subsidiary of FAW Group. Its principal activity was the design, development, manufacture and distribution of automobiles sold under the Xiali, Vita and Junpai marques. It was listed on the Shenzhen Stock Exchange.

Tianjin FAW was founded in 1965 and was originally considered one of the "three smalls" of the Chinese automotive industry, together with Guangzhou Honda and Beijing. Tianjin FAW moved into third place in the Chinese market in 1997. By 2000 they were in second place, in spite of the low quality of their products. Production volumes were high because many towns used Xiali cars as taxicabs. Many of the smaller towns in rural China had Xiali cars as taxicabs well into the second decade of the twenty-first century. Xiali parts were cheap and it was one of the cheapest cars to run in China. Due to their low running costs, Xiali cars in many towns survived as unofficial "black" taxies till well after they were replaced by other cars as legal taxies. Tianjin FAW subsequently lost market share to several new Chinese automobile manufacturers.

Amidst declining sales, the listed Tianjin FAW unit was dissolved, and its remaining assets, liabilities and employees were absorbed into various FAW Group units. The listed shell company was transferred for no consideration to China Railway Materials to facilitate the backdoor listing of one of its units.

Tianjin FAW operated a joint venture with Toyota, Tianjin FAW Toyota Motor Co., Ltd., which, now under FAW Group, produces Toyota passenger cars for the Chinese market including the Avalon, Corolla, Crown, Reiz and Vios.

== History ==
Tianjin FAW's first product, debuting in 1965, was a copy of the famous Beijing Jeep called the Tianjin TJ210. Between 1973 and 1979 the Toyota look-alike Tianjin TJ740 was also built, although only 63 were finished.

In the 1980s, Tianjin's directors decided to look abroad for a joint venture to enable them to build modern small cars. In 1983, Daihatsu had been chosen as a partner, and in November 1984 the first vehicle rolled out from the works. At first, local parts content was a mere 8%, but this had jumped to 85% by the end of 1987. The first product was a locally built Daihatsu Hijet in 1984, followed by the Charade which began local assembly in 1986.

Production began at a modest level, with 2873 automobiles (Charade) and 9329 minivans (Hijet) assembled in 1988, for a total of 12,202 vehicles. This increased rapidly, to an annual total of nearly 88,000 cars by 1996.

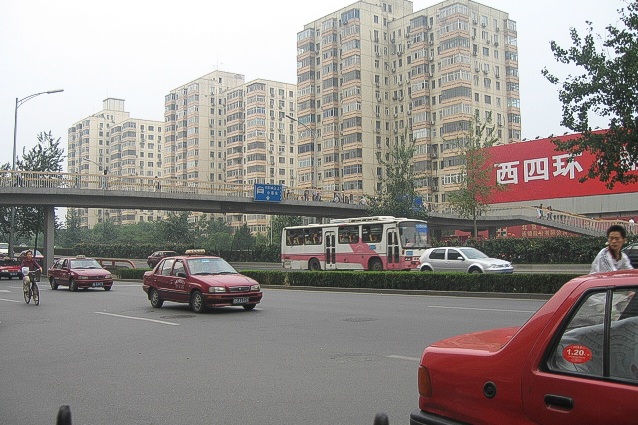
Xiali taxicabs in Beijing in 2005; The fare of Xiali was 1.2 yuan per kilometer, while Citroën Fukang was 1.6 yuan per kilometer

Before the Toyota joint venture, Tianjin FAW produced the Tianjin Xiali TJ730 (based on the 1983 Daihatsu Charade) and then the TJ7100-TJ7131 hatchback and TJ7100U-TJ7131U sedan under the Xiali brand that was formed in August 1997. Xiali (夏利) is Chinese for "Charade". The TJ7100-series cars, based on the 1987 Charade. They were very popular in China as taxicabs throughout the 1980s and the 1990s, when the Chinese Volkswagen Jetta also joined the taxi market, followed by the Hyundai Sonata and Elantra in the 2000s. The Xiali taxi was retired from taxi use in February 2006 in an effort to cut down pollution.

Production of the Daihatsu-based Xiali N3 ran from 2004 to 2012. Production at the Tianjin Xiali plant had shifted to more modern Toyota vehicles, for example the Xiali 2000 that was based on the Toyota Platz/Vitz but the production of the much cheaper Xiali outlived the Xiali 2000. Toyota also builds and sells vehicles in China under its own brand.

The Xiali brand was discontinued in 2015 and was replaced by the new brand called Junpai.

From 1984 to 2002, Tianjin FAW manufactured Hijet-based Daihatsu mini trucks in China rebranded as Huali Dafa. Currently Huali offers the first generation Daihatsu Terios and second generation Daihatsu Move.

FAW Tianjin also produced the Miles ZX40, an electric version of the Daihatsu Move which became the first Chinese-built vehicle sold in the United States when it was offered in mid-2006 by Miles Automotive Group.

Since 2012, FAW Xiali's net profit after deducting non-recurring items has been negative, and sales have also begun to decline year by year, from 185,000 units in 2012 to 37,000 units in 2016. During this period, due to two consecutive years of losses in 2013 and 2014, the Shenzhen Stock Exchange issued a delisting risk warning. In June 2019, Xiali officially stopped producing models, with an annual output of only 1,186 units.

On December 23, 2019, FAW Xiali issued an announcement to disclose the asset restructuring plan with China Railway Materials. China First Automobile Co., Ltd. plans to transfer its approximately 697 million shares of FAW Xiali (accounting for 43.73% of FAW Xiali's total share capital before this transaction) to China Railway Materials free of charge. On January 8, 2021, FAW Xiali was renamed China Railway Materials, from then on the reorganized company no longer engaged in automobile production business.

== Models ==
=== Past ===
- 1965: Tianjin TJ210 C, a transferred extended production of the Beijing BJ212
- 1973–1979: Tianjin TJ740, a Chinese copy of a Toyota sedan fitted with a 1.8 litre engine
- 1986.09–1988: Xiali TJ730, a hatchback based on the Daihatsu Charade (G11)
- 1984–2002: Huali Dafa, a locally produced Daihatsu Hijet originally known as the Tianjin TJ110. Was used as a popular taxicab. Available with the 843 cc CD engine and 4-speed manual gearbox.
- 1988–1997: Xiali TJ 7100, a hatchback based on the Daihatsu Charade (G100)
- 1997.12–1999: Xiali TJ 7100 A, a facelifted TJ 7100 hatchback
- 1999–2007: Xiali TJ 7101/TJ 7131, new name for the TJ 7100 A hatchback. Available with a 1.0 and 1.3 litre engine
- 1999–2003: Xiali TJ 7101 L/TJ 7131 L, a TJ 7101 hatchback lengthened by 8 cm. Available with a 1.0 and 1.3 litre engine
- 2003.05–2011: Xiali A Junya (Junior) (TJ 7101 A-TJ 7141 A), a slightly facelifted version of the existing hatchback range, new bumpers and some new engine options. 1,425 cc version since June 2005. Facelifted in March 2006, this and the Shenya were known as the "A+" until 2011
- 1990.10–2000: Xiali TJ 7100 U/TJ 7130 U, a sedan based on the Daihatsu Charade (G100)
- 1997.12–2000: Xiali TJ 7100 UA/TJ 7130 UA, a facelifted TJ 7100 U sedan. Available with a 1.1 and 1.3 litre engine
- 1999–2004: Xiali TJ 7101 UAL/TJ 7131 UAL, a Xiali TJ 7100 UA/TJ 7130 UA sedan lengthened by 8 cm. Available with a 1.1 and 1.3 litre engine
- 2001–2006: Xiali TJ 7101 U/TJ 7131 U, new name for the TJ 7101 UA sedan. Available with a 1.0 and 1.3 litre engine
- 2003.05–2011: Xiali A Shenya (Senior) (TJ 7101 AU-TJ 7141 AU), a slightly facelifted version of the existing sedan range released in May 2003 with new bumpers and some new engine options. 1,425 cc version since June 2005. Facelifted in March 2006, renamed as the A+ and remained in production until 2011
- 2002.12–2012: Xiali Vizi, a hatchback based on the Toyota Vitz. Known as 夏利威姿 in Chinese.
- 2000.12–2007: Xiali 2000 TJ 7136 U, a sedan based on the Toyota Platz
- 2002.09–2003.12: Xiali Yaku, a limited edition Xiali 2000 with an automatic gearbox
- 2004.03–2012: Xiali Vela CA 7156 U, a sister model of the Toyota Platz 2nd Gen
- 2004.08–2012: Xiali N3 (B series) TJ 7101 B-TJ 7131 BU, hatchbacks and sedans based on facelifted Xiali A series, with its origins in the Xiali N3, an updated sedan based on the previous Xiali series. This car was available in Mexico known as the F1 and was sold from 2008 to 2010. The N3 was facelifted in March 2008 and named as the N3+.
- 2006.10–2011: Weizhi C1 (CA 7130 /CA 7140), an independent development also marketed as the FAW Vita launched in October 2006. The car is available with the 5A-FE and 8A-FE engines from Toyota.
- 2009.11–2014: Xiali N5 (TJ 7103 UE/TJ 7133 UE), a sedan based on the Xiali N3
- 2010–2012: Weizhi V2 (TJ 7137 E4S), a hatchback with a 1.3 litre engine.
- 2012–2015: Weizhi V5 (CA 7150 BUE), a facelifted Weizhi C1.
- 2013–2015: Xiali N7, a Mini SUV
- 2014–2019: Junpai D60, an SUV with a 1.5 litre engine as well as the 1.8 litre 2ZR-FE engine.
- 2016–2018: Junpai A70, a compact sedan introduced in September 2016.
- 2018–2019: Junpai D80, a SUV.
- 2018–2019: Junpai A50, a sedan with a 1.5 litre engine
- 2018–2019: Junpai CX65, a wagon. First car of the brand to get the new English marque Jumpal, which was discontinued in 2019.

Model designation

U = sedan
A = facelift
L = long wheelbase

== Gallery ==
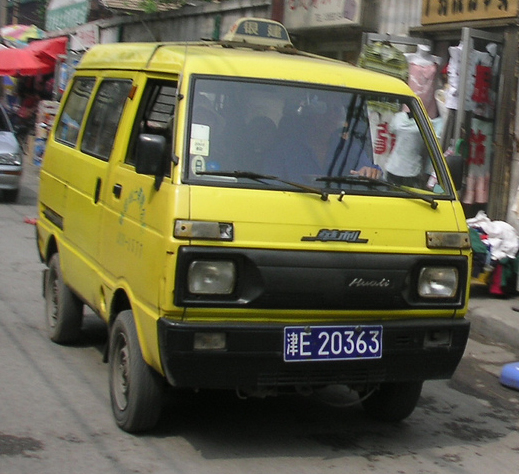
Dafa TJ110
华利 大发TJ110
1984–2002

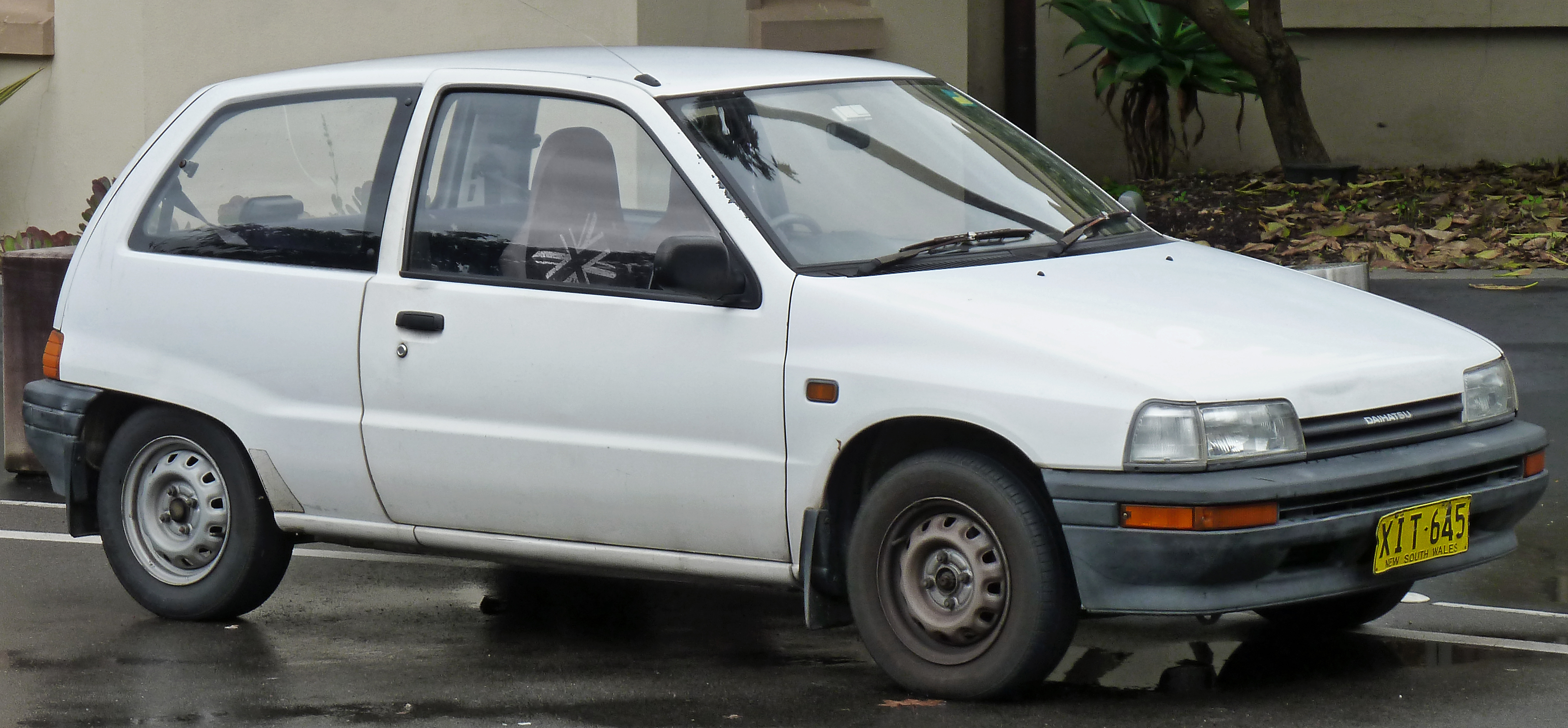
Xiali TJ 7100
夏利 TJ7100
1988–1997

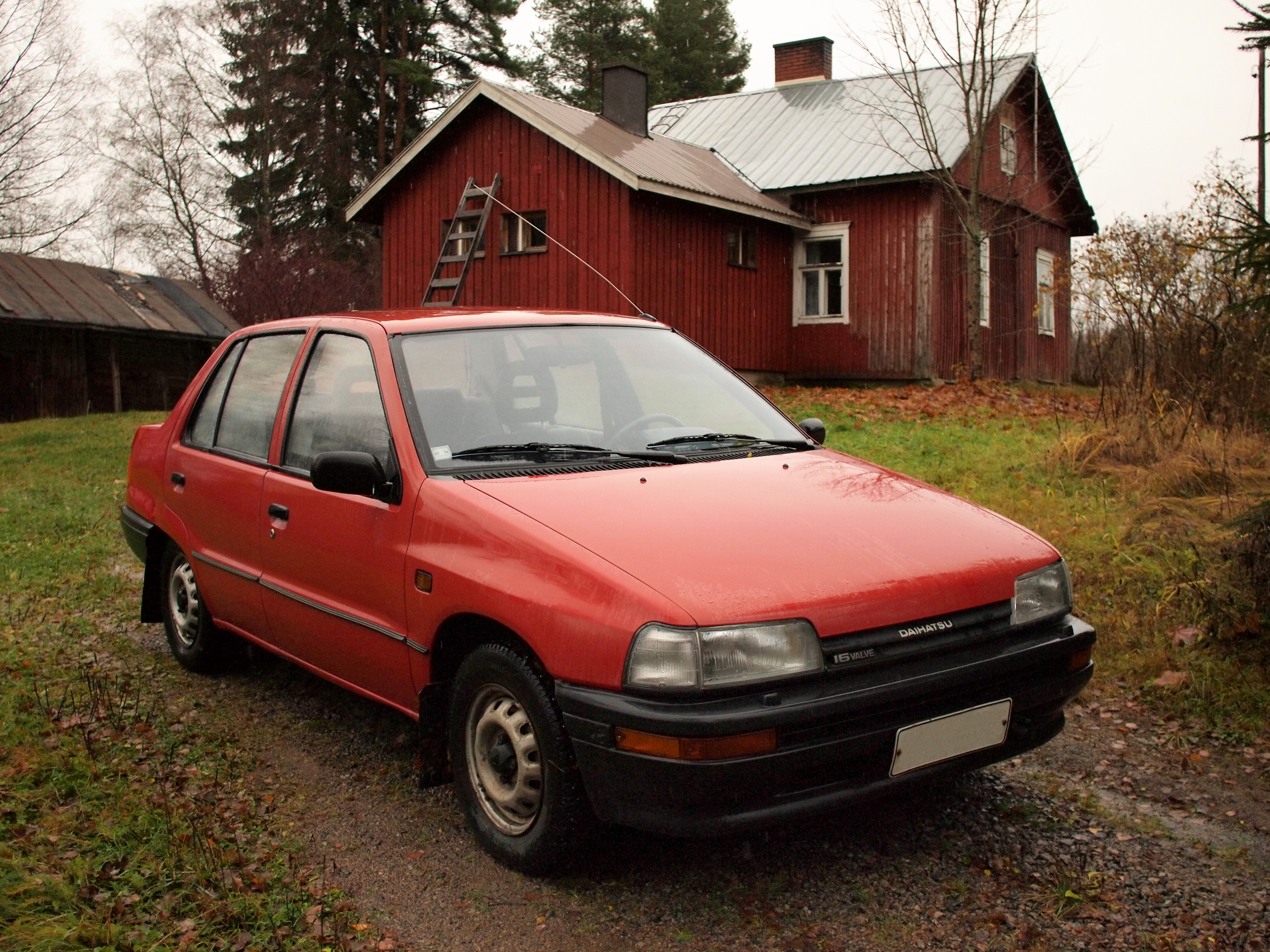
Xiali TJ 7100U
夏利 TJ7100U
1990–2000

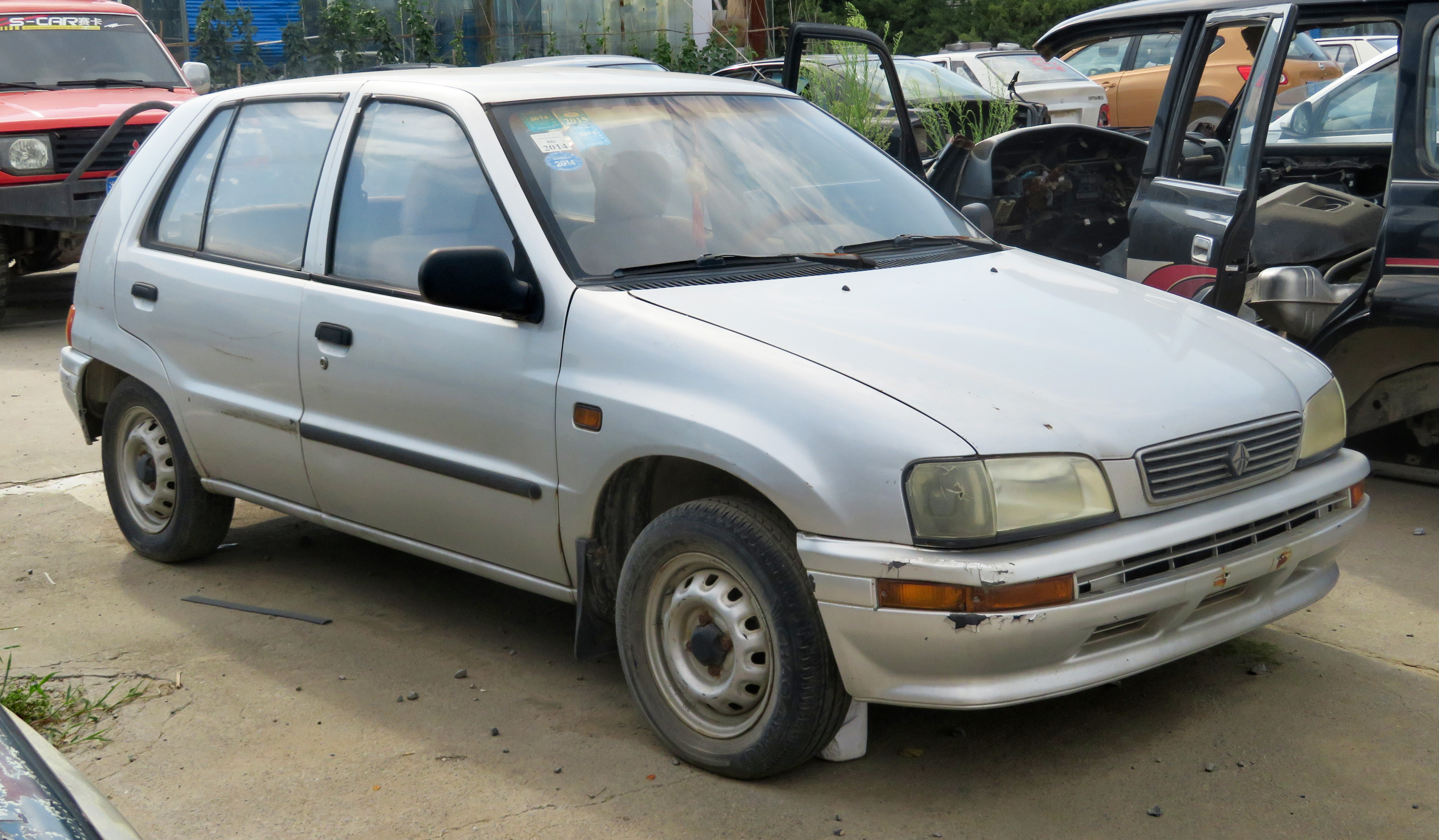
Xiali TJ 7100A/7101/7131
夏利 TJ7100A/7101/7131
1997–2007

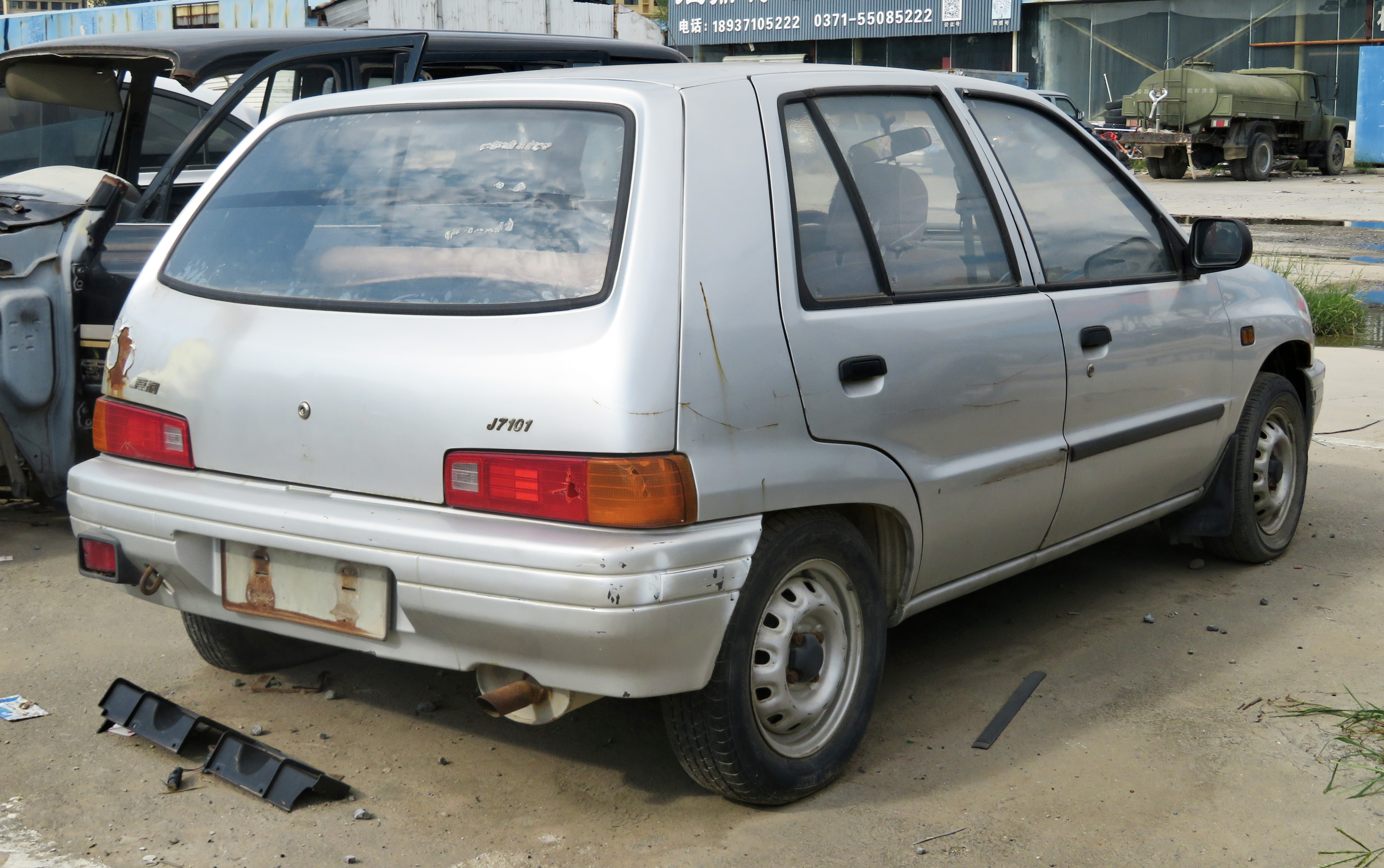
Xiali TJ 7100A/7101/7131
rear view

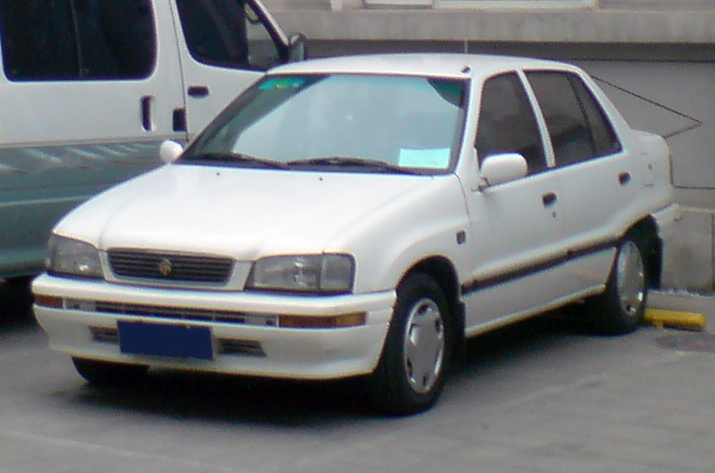
Xiali TJ 7101UA-TJ7131UA
夏利 TJ7101UA or 7131UA
2001–2006

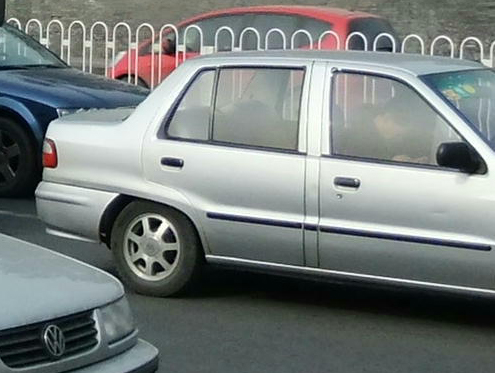
Xiali TJ7130AUL
夏利 TJ7130AUL
1999–2004

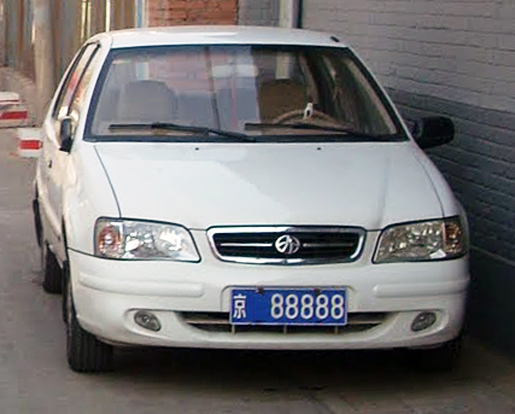
Xiali A Junya
夏利骏雅 TJ7101A-TJ7141A
2005–2011

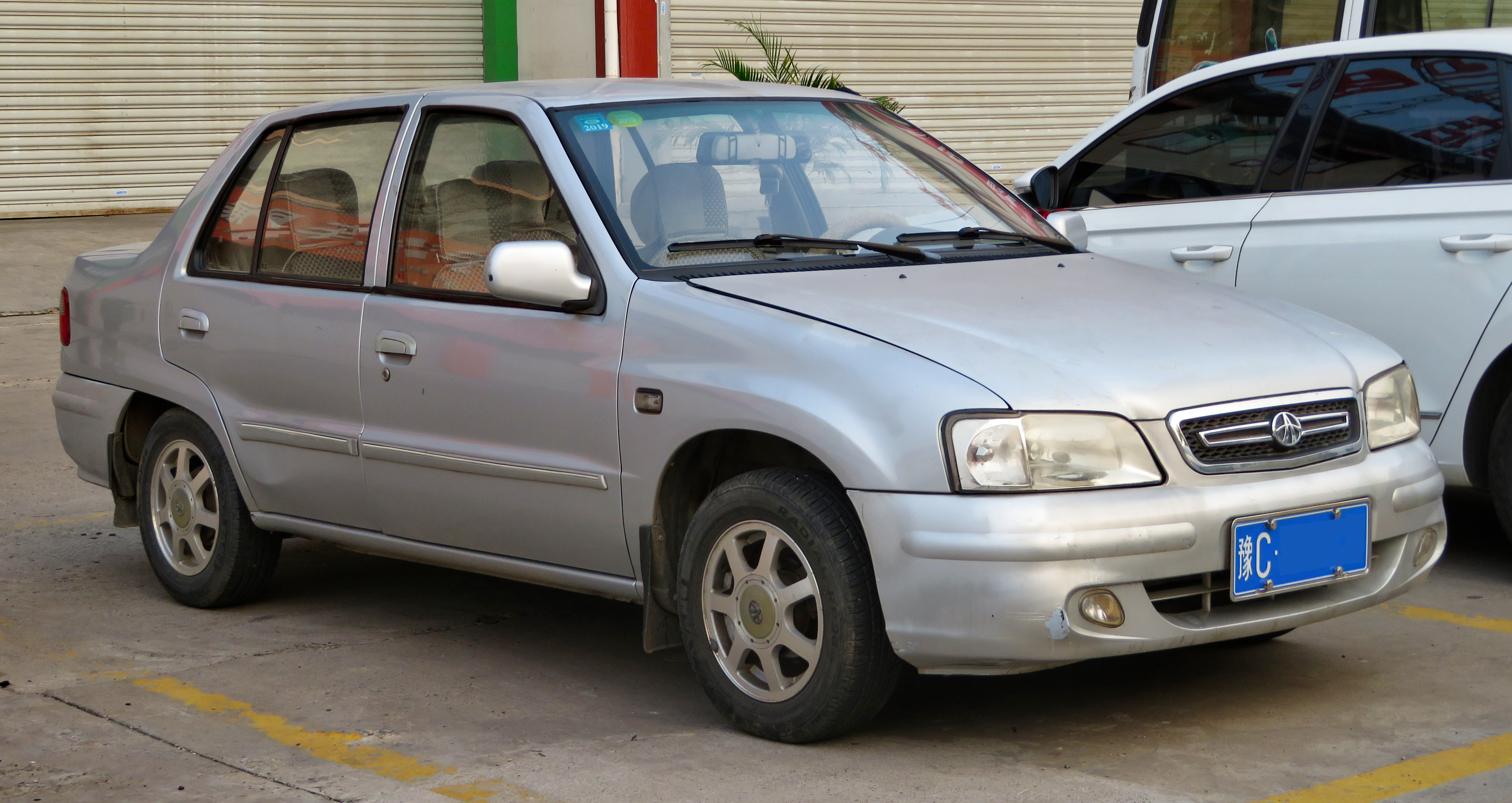
Xiali A Shenya
夏利绅雅 TJ7101UA-TJ7141UA
2003–2011

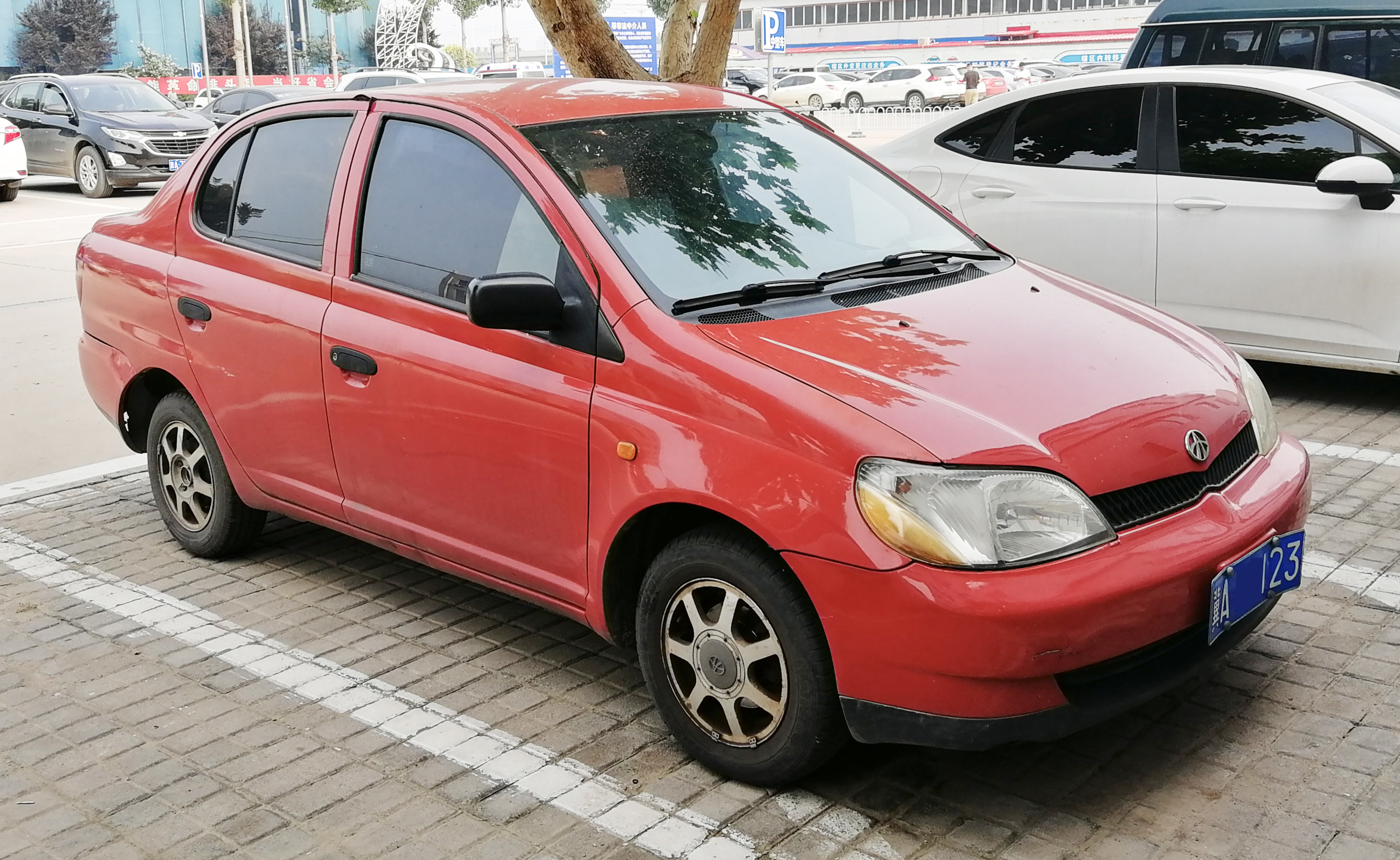
Xiali 2000 TJ 7136U
夏利 2000 TJ7136U
2000–2007

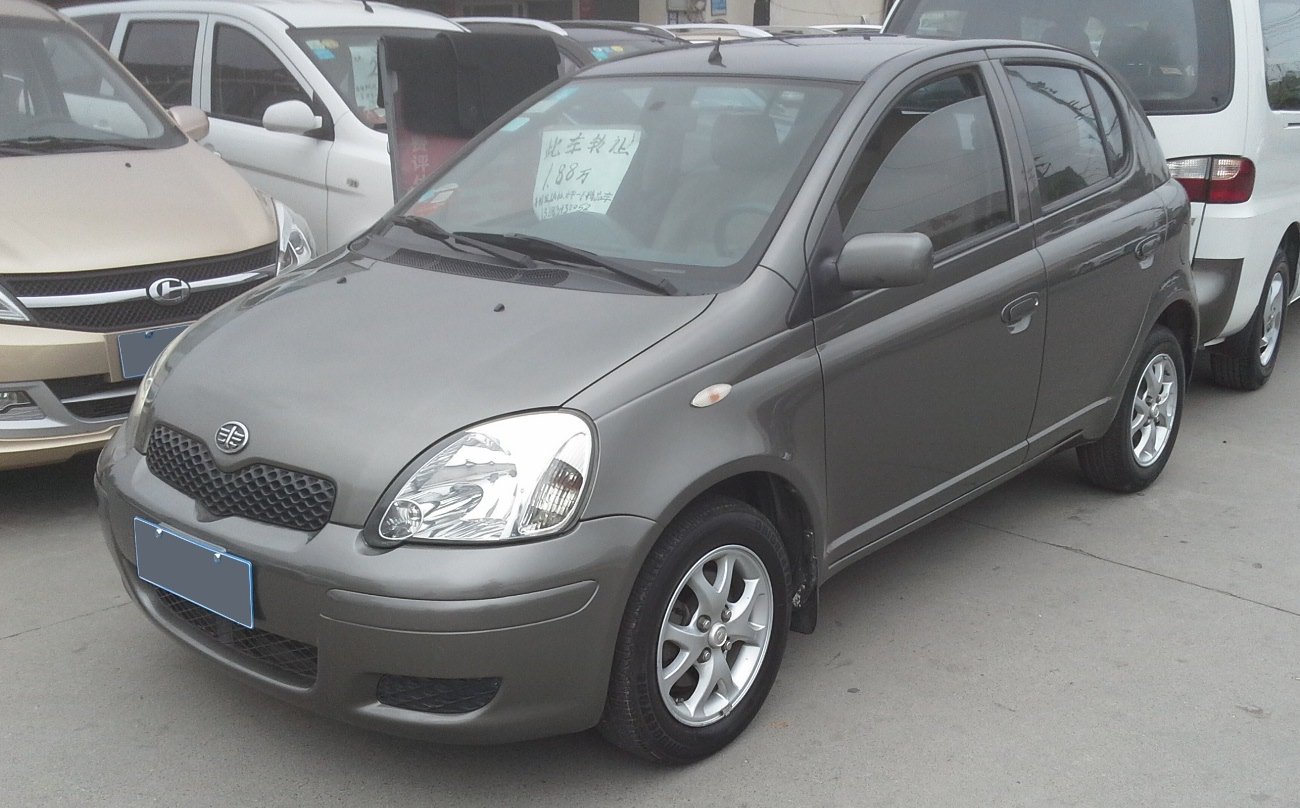
Xiali Vizi
夏利 威姿
2002–2012

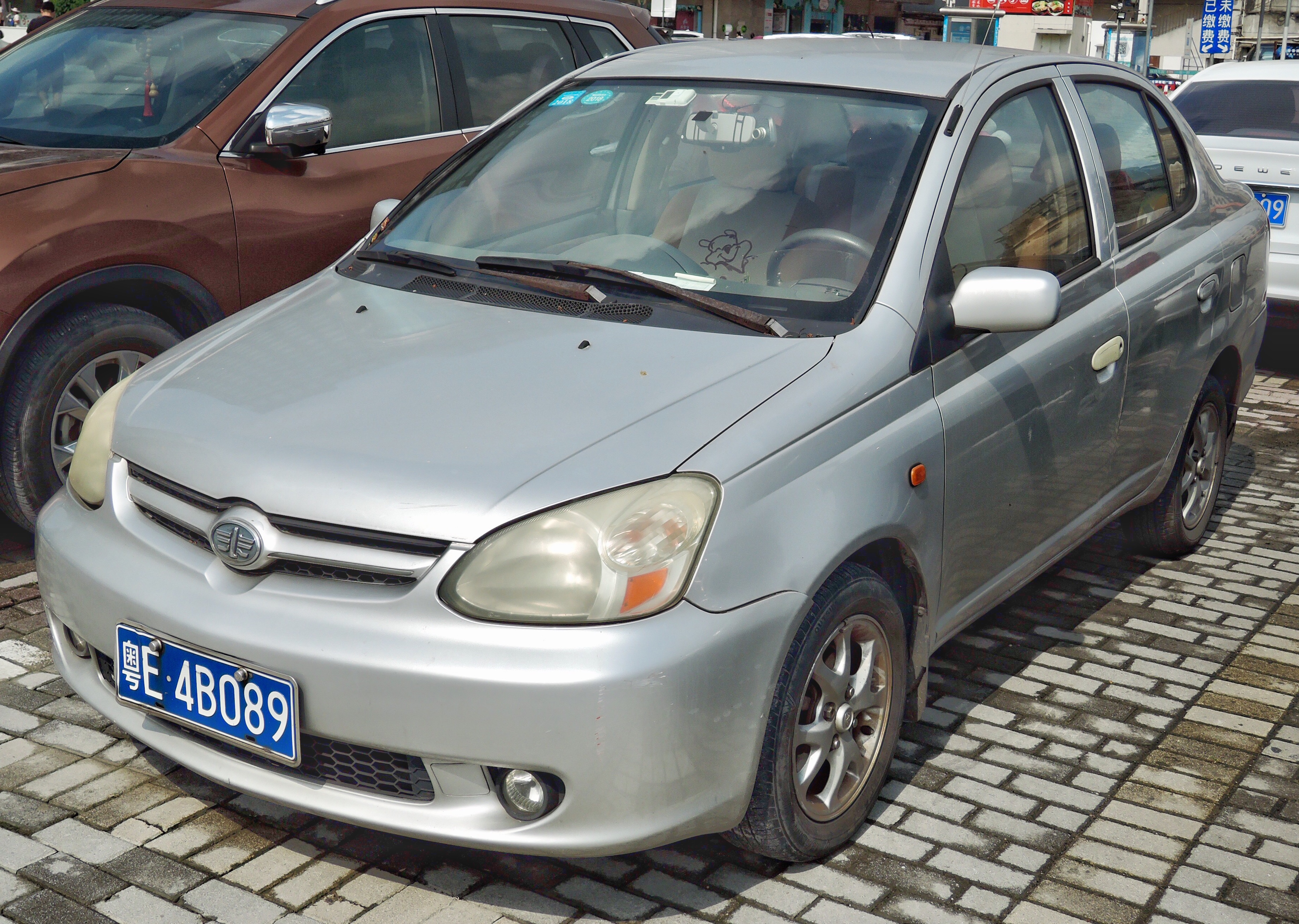
Xiali Vela
夏利 威乐
2004–2012

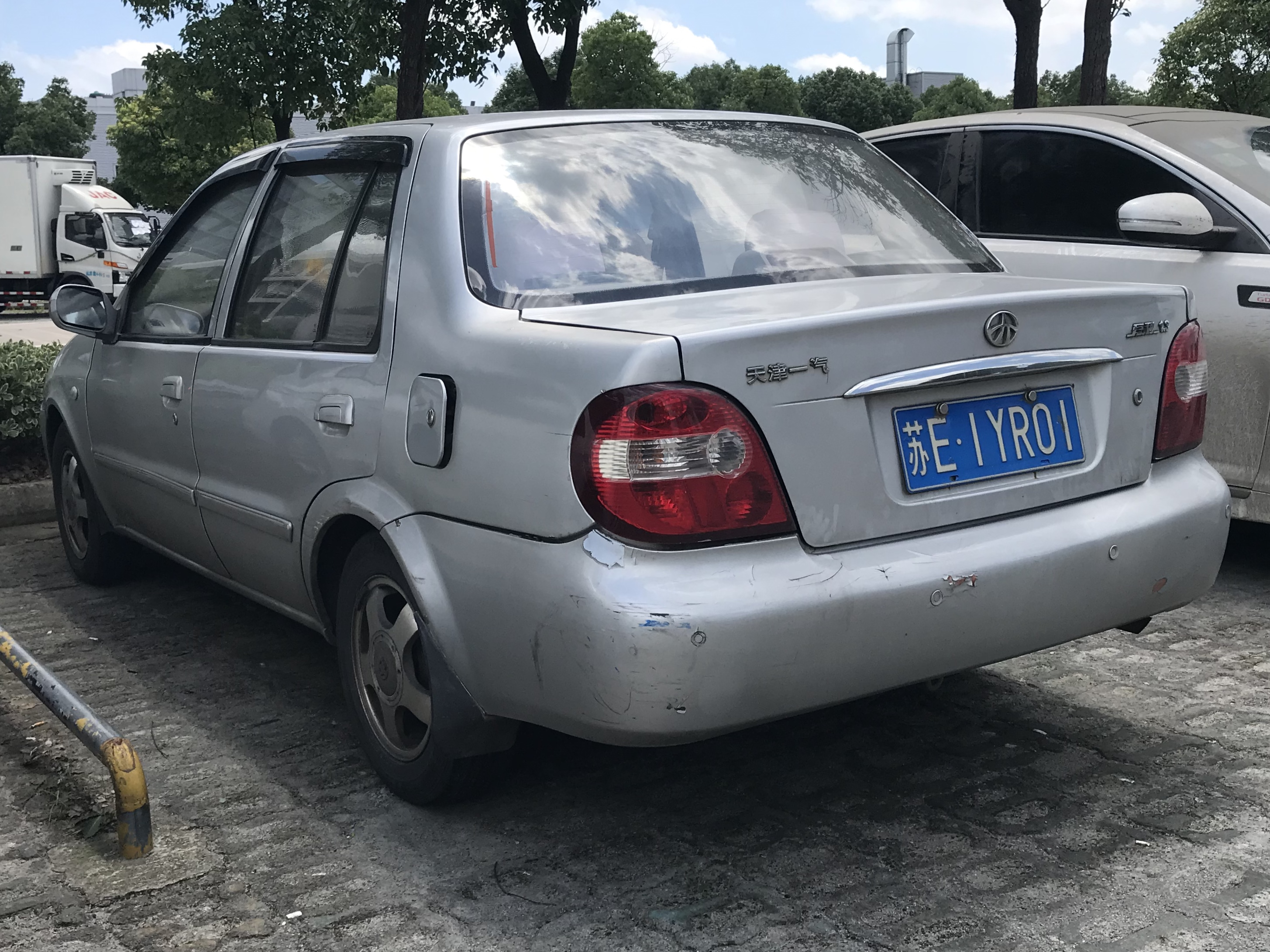
Xiali N3 sedan
2004–2012

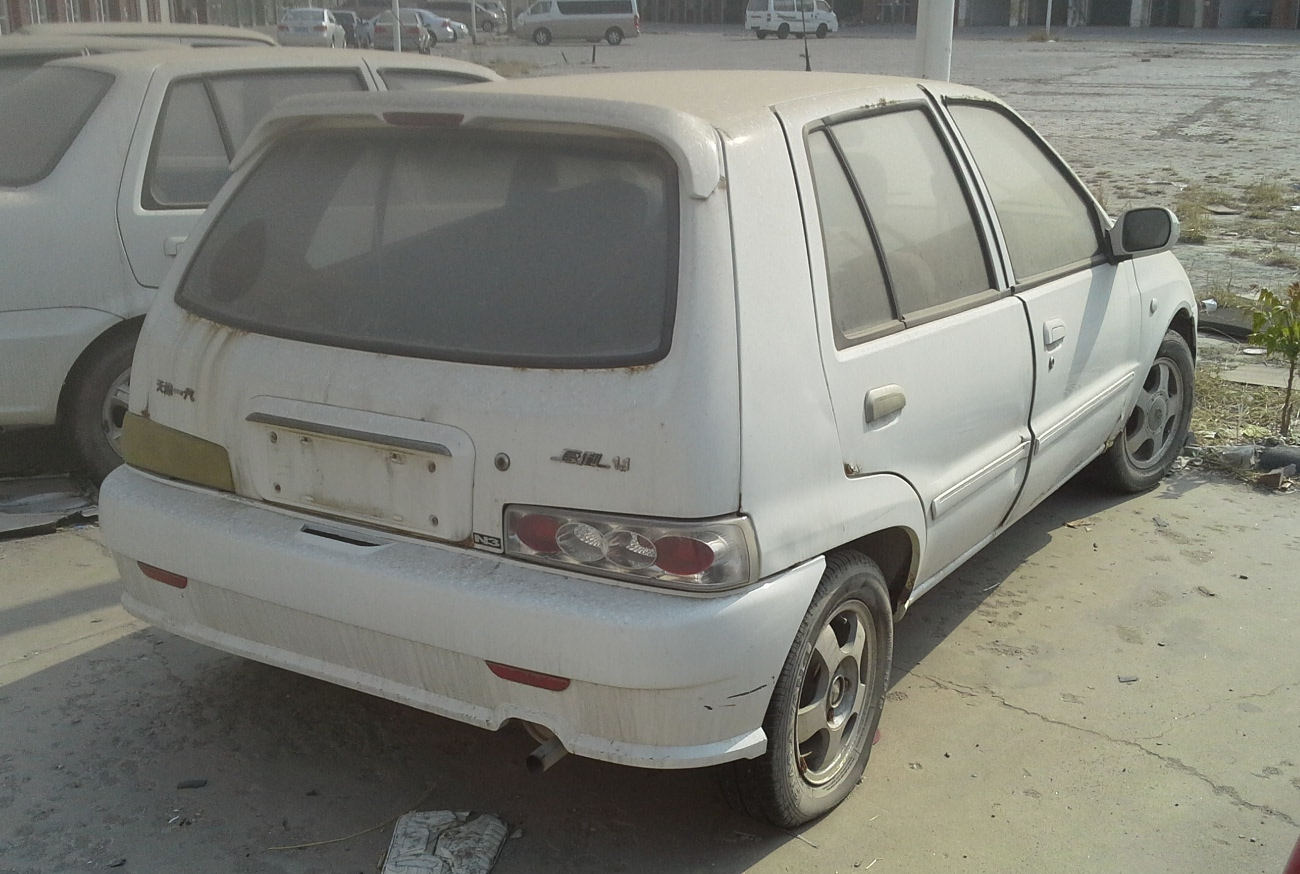
Xiali N3 hatchback
2004–2011

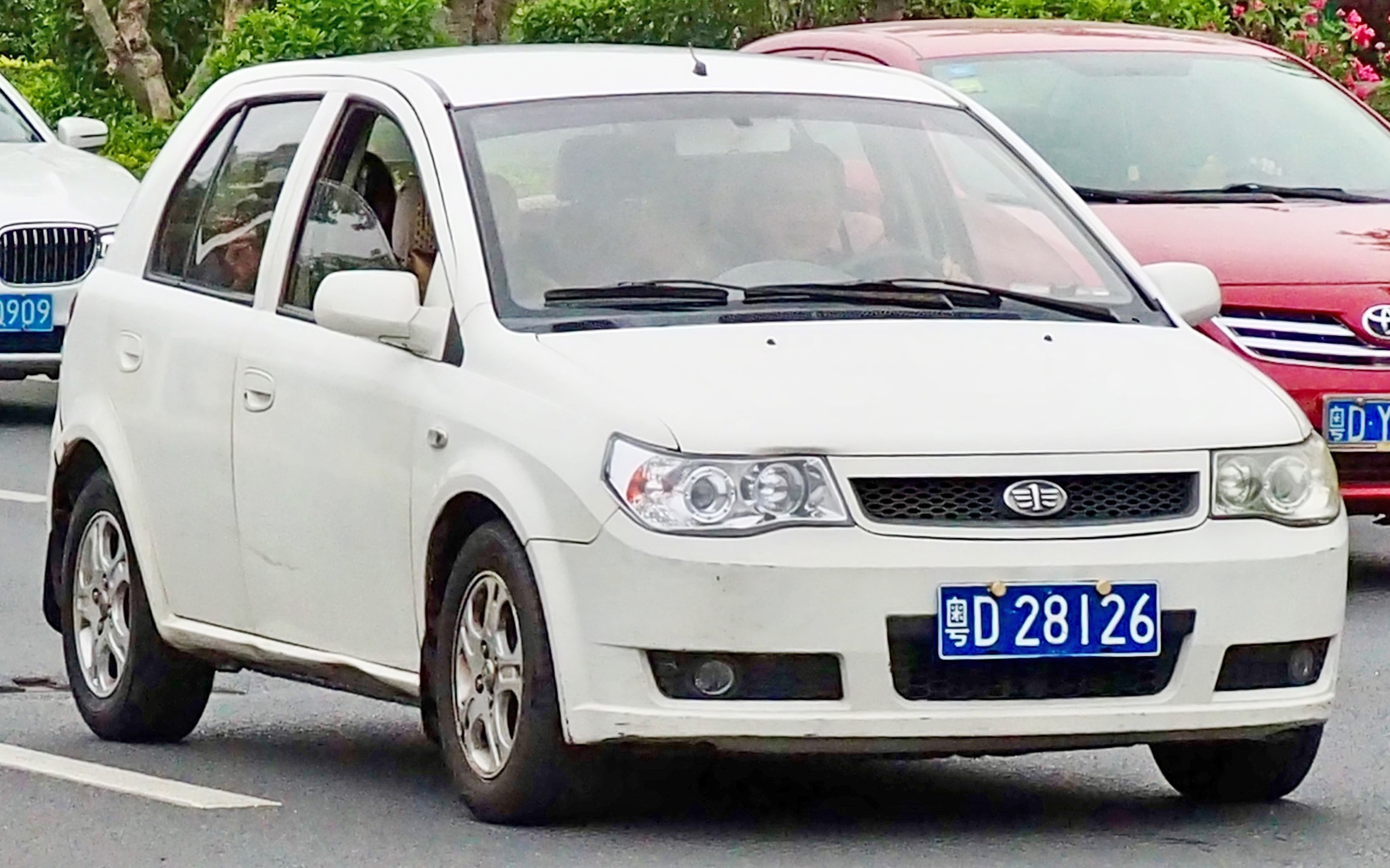
Xiali Weizhi
夏利 威志
2006–2011

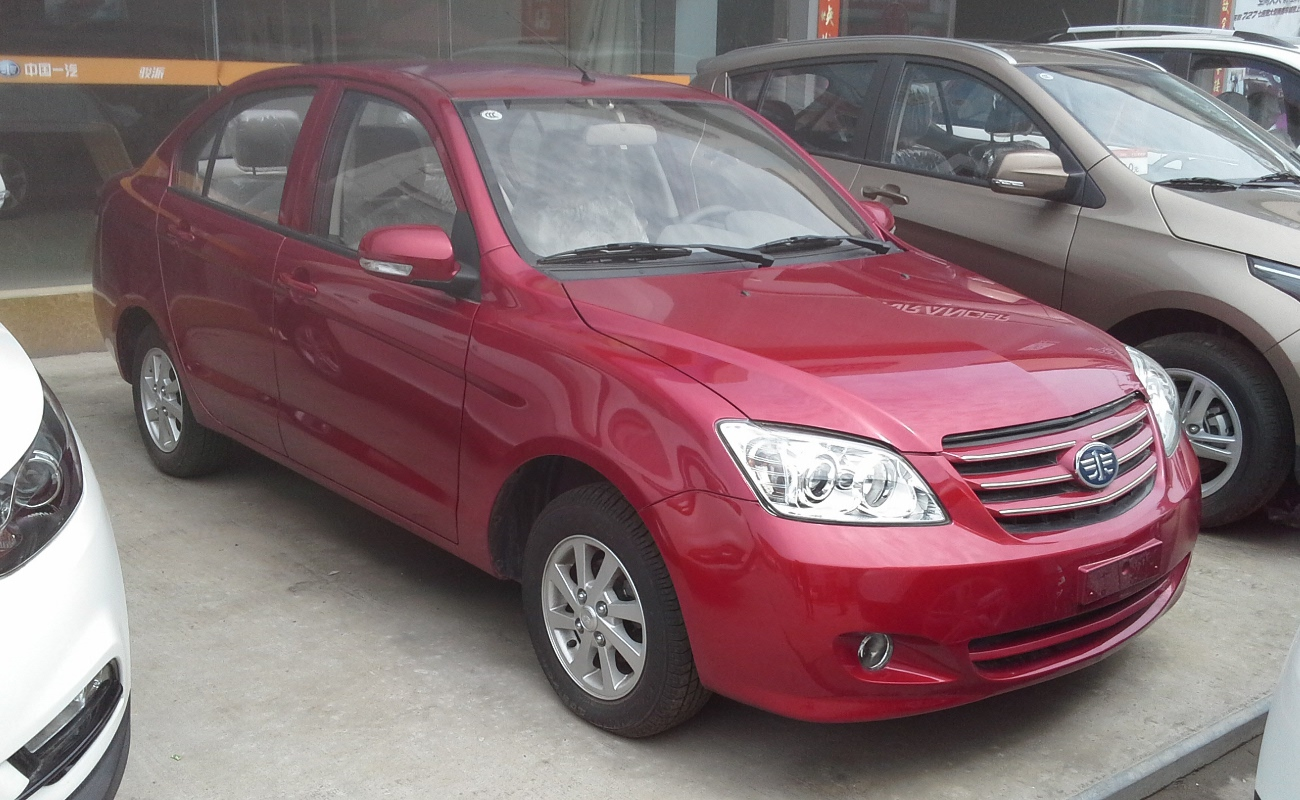
Xiali N5
夏利 N5 TJ7103UE/TJ7133UE
2009–2014

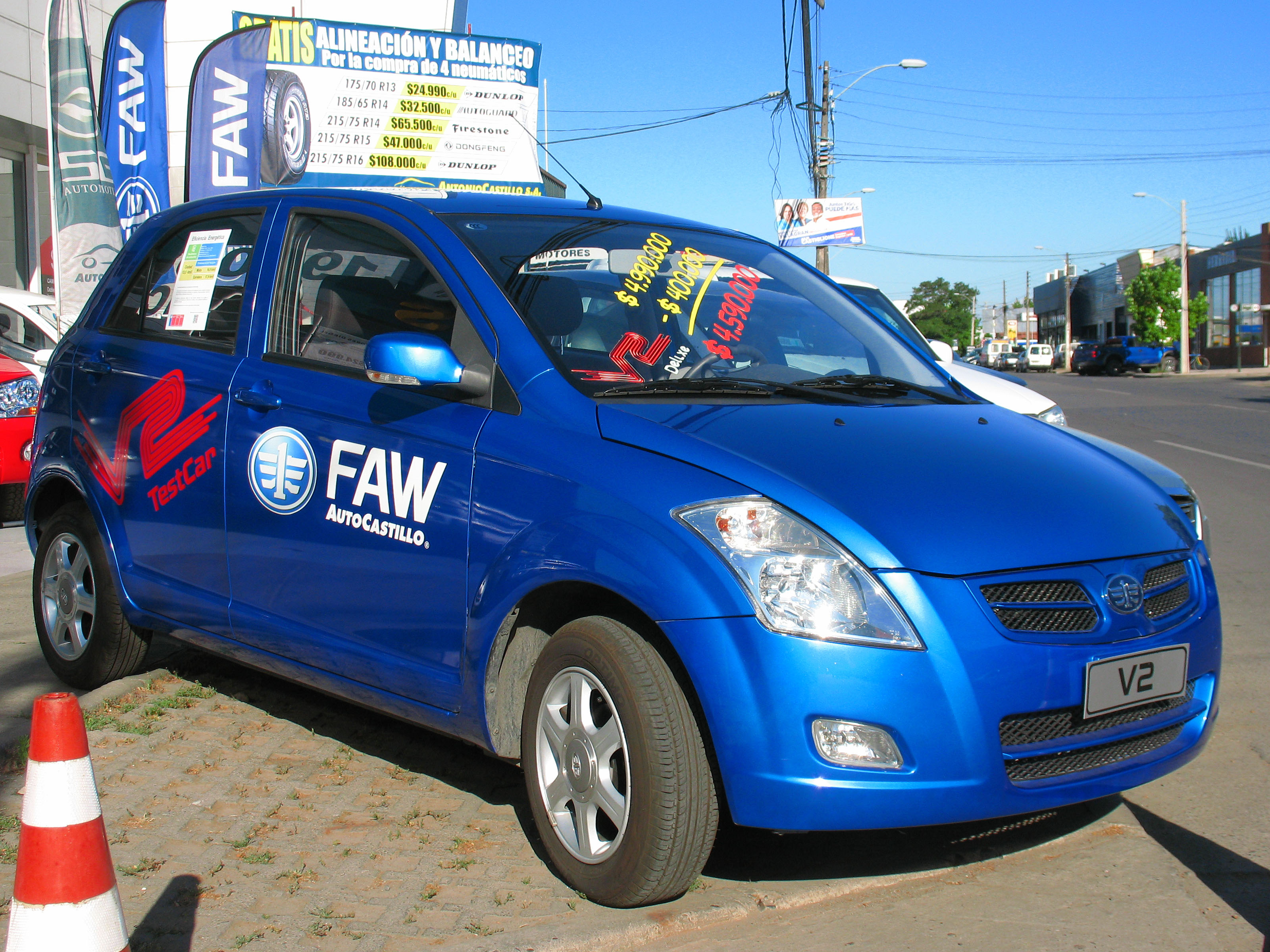
Weizhi V2
夏利 威志 V2
2010–2012

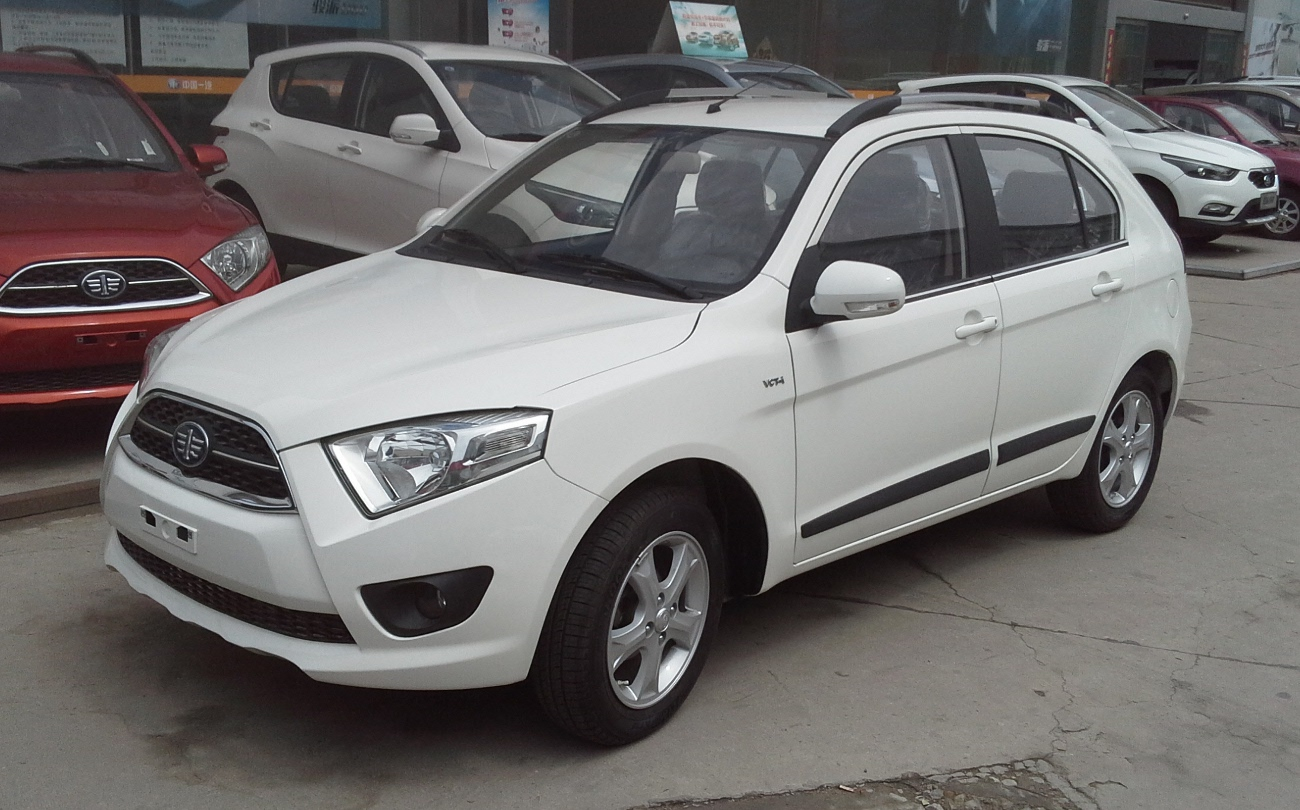
Xiali N7 Mini SUV
夏利 N7
2013–2015

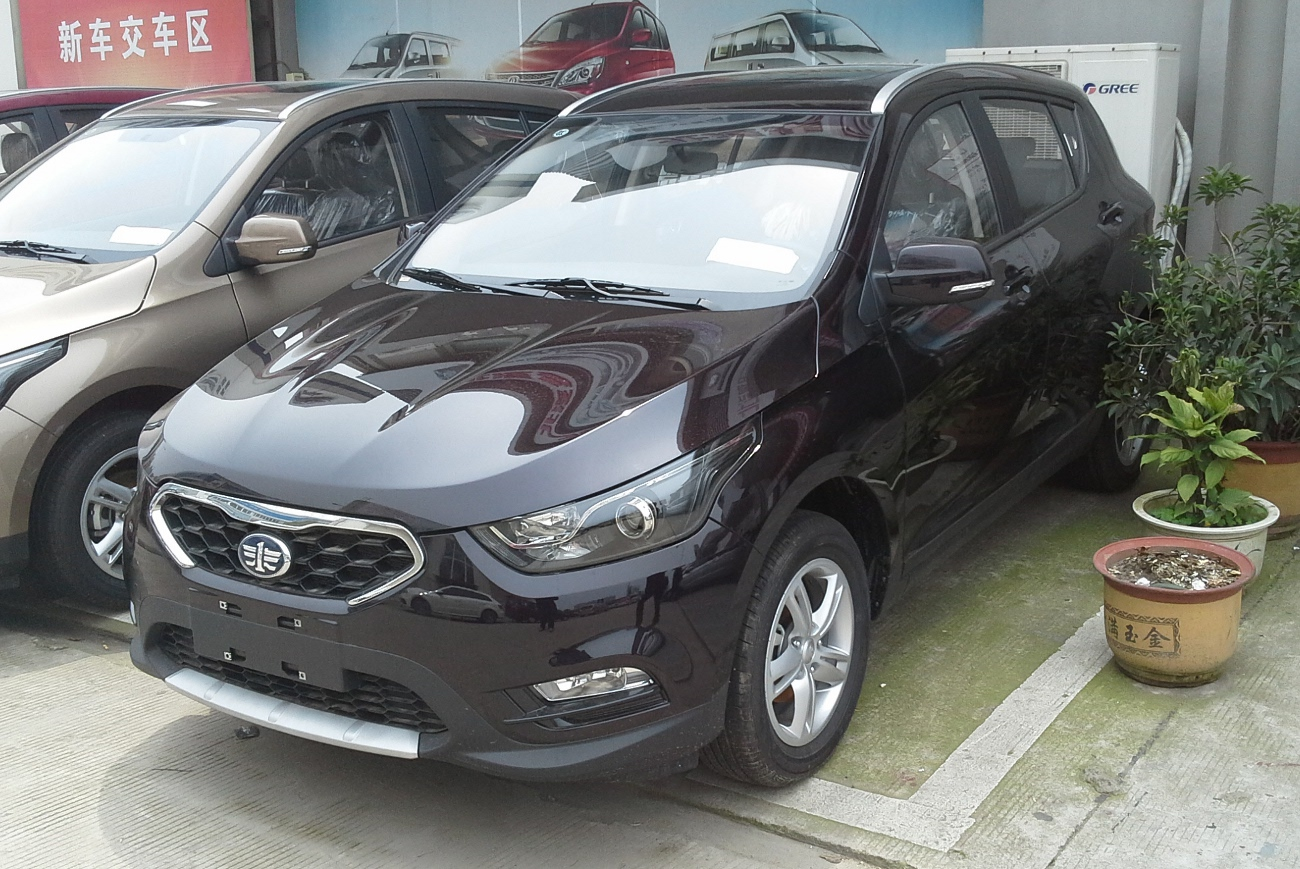
Junpai D60
骏派 D60
2014–2019

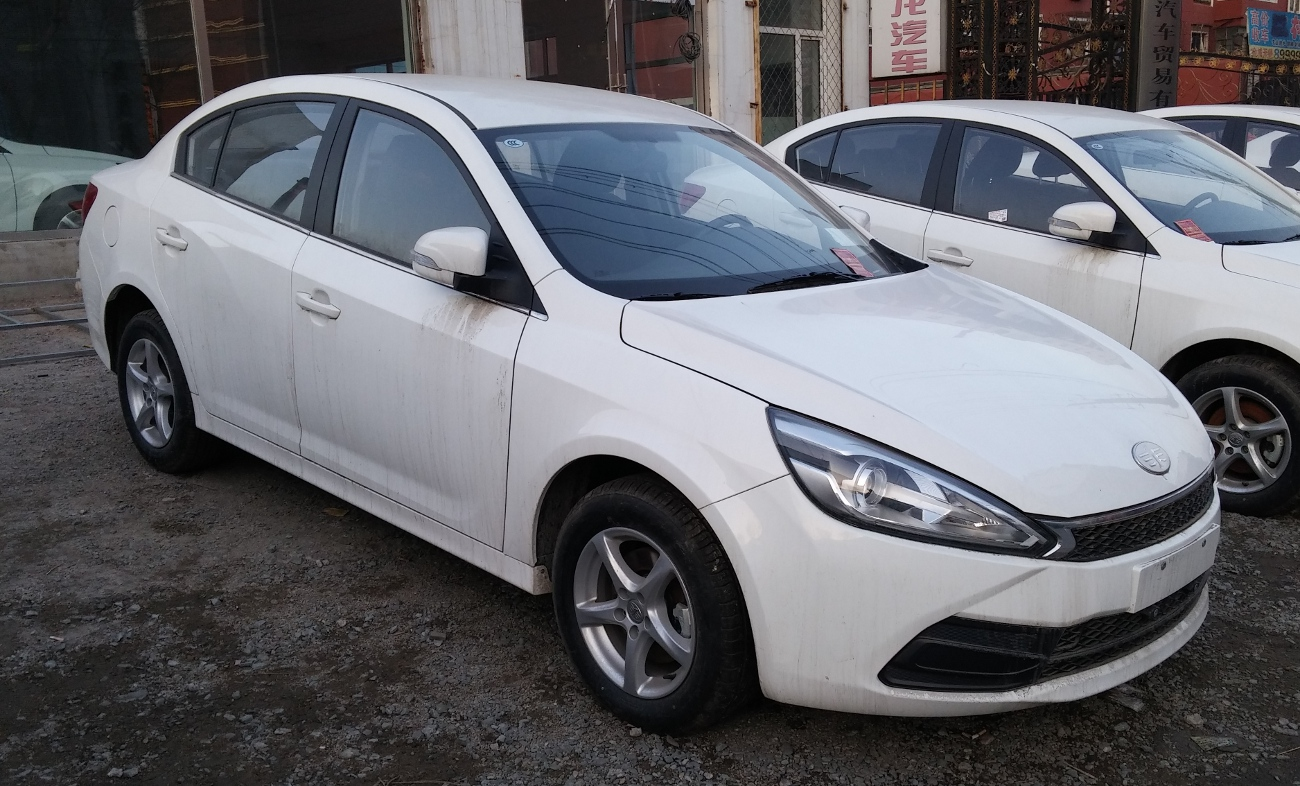
Junpai A70
骏派 A70
2016–2018

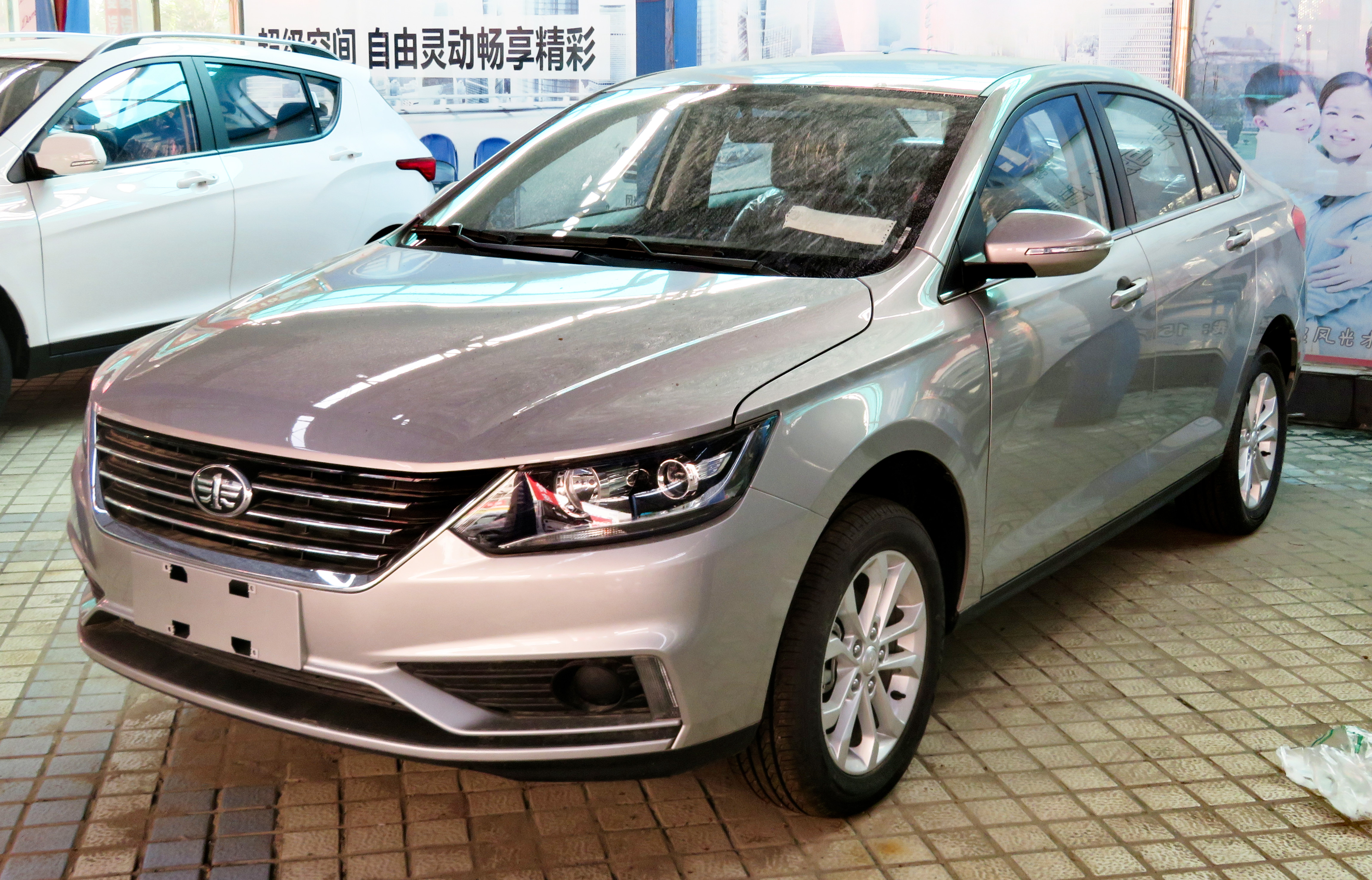
Junpai A50
骏派 A50
2018–2019

Junpai CX65
骏派 CX65
2018–2019

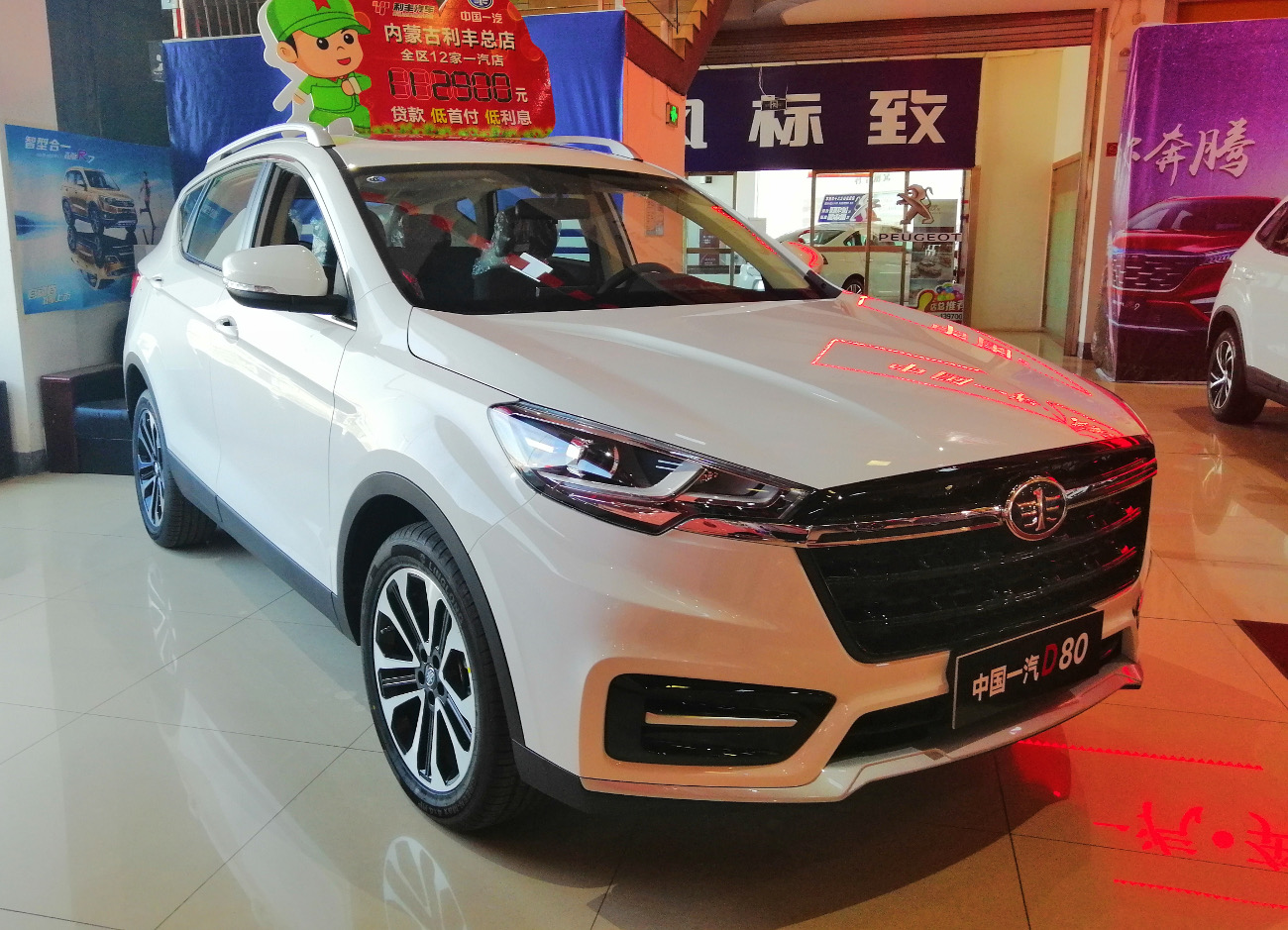
Junpai D80
骏派 D80
2018–2019
