= Xiali N7 =

Chinese subcompact SUV

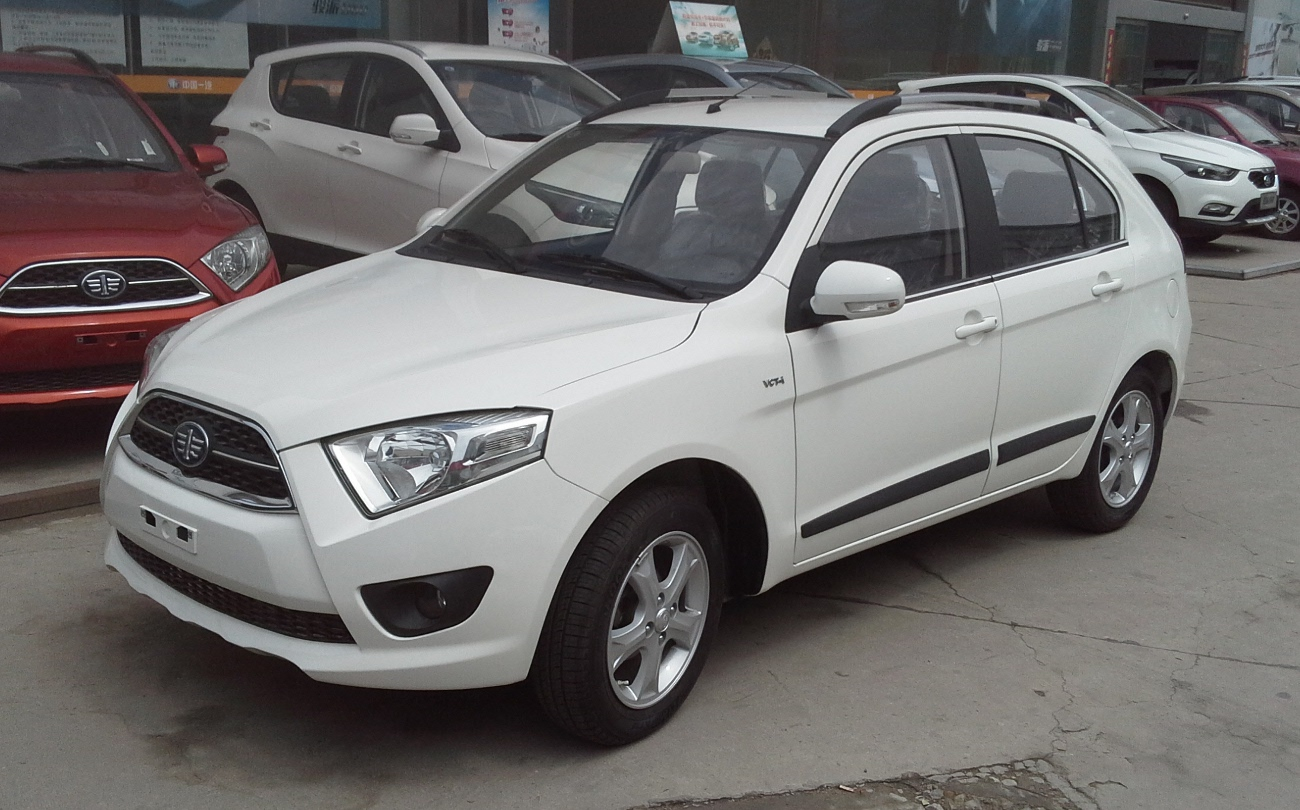

Overview
- Manufacturer: FAW Group (Tianjin FAW)
- Production: 2013–2019
- Assembly: Tianjin, China

Body and chassis
- Class: Subcompact crossover SUV
- Body style: 5-door hatchback
- Layout: Front-engine, front-wheel-drive

Powertrain
- Engine: 1.3 L I4 (petrol)
- Power output: 67 kW (90 hp)
- Transmission: 5-speed manual; 4-speed automatic

Dimensions
- Wheelbase: 2,410 mm (94.9 in)
- Length: 3,950 mm (155.5 in)
- Width: 1,650 mm (65.0 in)
- Height: 1,505–1,550 mm (59.3–61.0 in)
- Curb weight: 945–965 kg (2,083–2,127 lb)

The Xiali N7 is a subcompact crossover SUV produced by the Chinese automotive manufacturer FAW Group under the Xiali brand.

== Overview ==
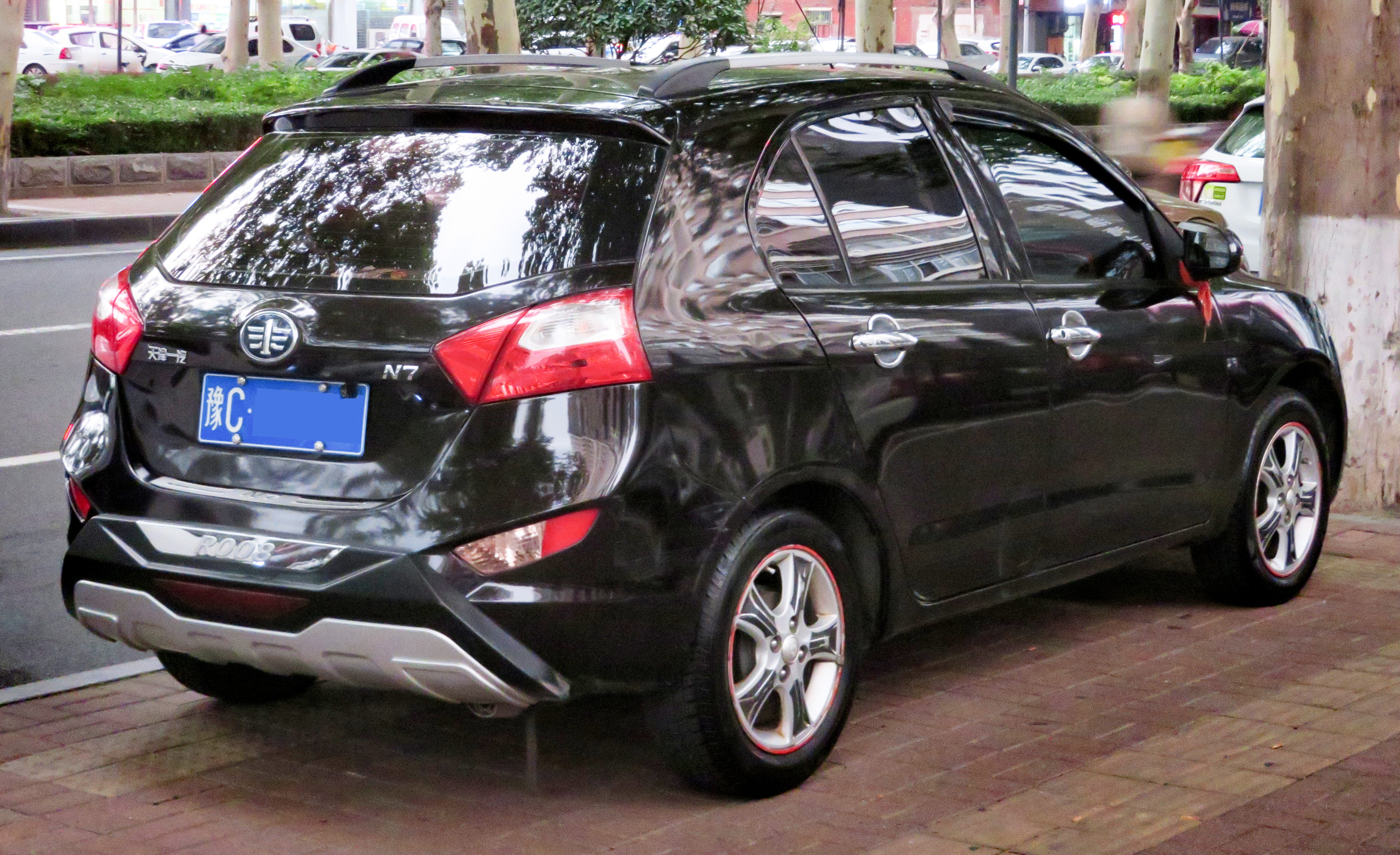
2015 FAW-Tianjin Xiali N7, rear

The N7 reveal was presented at the Shanghai Auto Show 2011 as the FAW R008 concept vehicle. In March 2013, the N7 was launched exclusively for the Chinese market. The N7 is based on the same platform as the Xiali N5. It is in fact a hatchback variant of the N5 which is a sedan. Production of the N7 stopped at the end of 2019.

== Specifications ==
The five-seater is powered by a 67 kW (90 hp) 1.3-liter gasoline engine with four cylinders, which is also used in the Xiali N5. The vehicle has a 5-speed manual transmission as standard, a 4-speed automatic transmission is available for an additional charge.
