= FAW Vita =

Chinese subcompact car

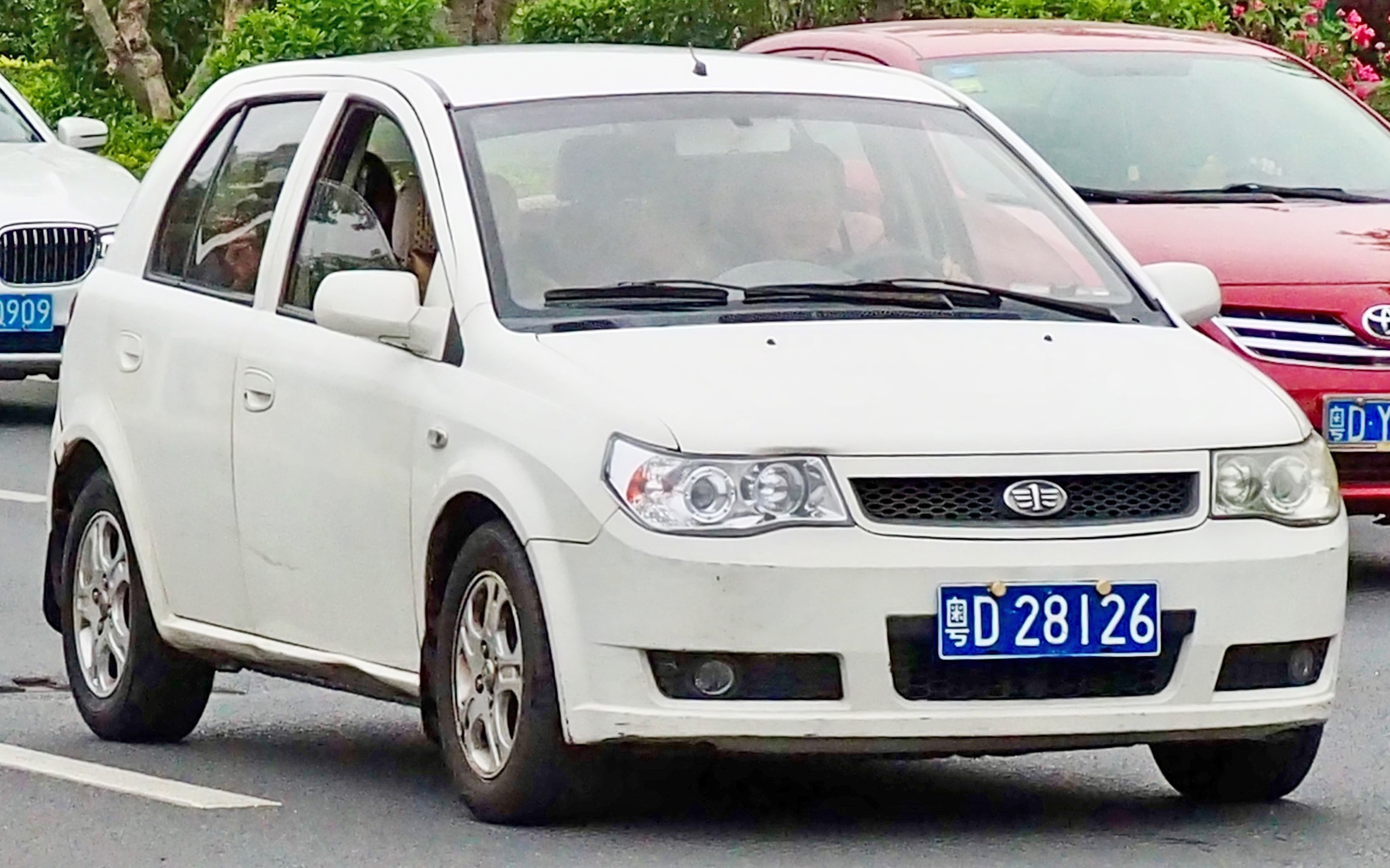

Overview
- Manufacturer: FAW Tianjin
- Also called: FAW Weizhi hatch FAW Weizhi sedan FAW Weizhi C1; FAW Weizhi V5; FAW Vita C1; FAW Vita V5; Rhine Vela V5 (Iran); FAW F5 (Russia); FAW Cale
- Production: July 2006–2012 (Weizhi C1); 2012–2015 (Weizhi V5)
- Assembly: Tianjin, China

Body and chassis
- Class: Subcompact (B)
- Body style: 5-door hatchback (2006-2012) 4-door sedan (2006-2015)
- Layout: FF layout

Powertrain
- Engine: 1.3 L 8A-FE I4 (Hatchback only); 1.4 L 4GB1 I4 (Hatchback only); 1.5 L 4GA5 I4 (Weizhi V5); 1.5 L 5A-FE I4 (C1 Sedan only)
- Transmission: 5-speed manual; 5-speed automatic; 4-speed automatic (Weizhi V5)

Dimensions
- Wheelbase: 2,425 mm (95.5 in)
- Length: 3,850 mm (151.6 in) (hatchback); 4,245 mm (167.1 in) (sedan)
- Width: 1,680 mm (66.1 in)
- Height: 1,500 mm (59.1 in)
- Curb weight: 965 kg (hatchback); 995 kg (sedan)

Chronology
- Predecessor: FAW Vizi; FAW Vela
- Successor: FAW Vizi V2

The FAW Vita (天津一汽-威志) or FAW Weizhi is a subcompact sedan and hatchback produced by FAW Group under the FAW Tianjin brand from July 2006 to 2015. The hatchback version is named the FAW Vita hatch while the sedan version is named the FAW Vita sedan.

== Overview ==
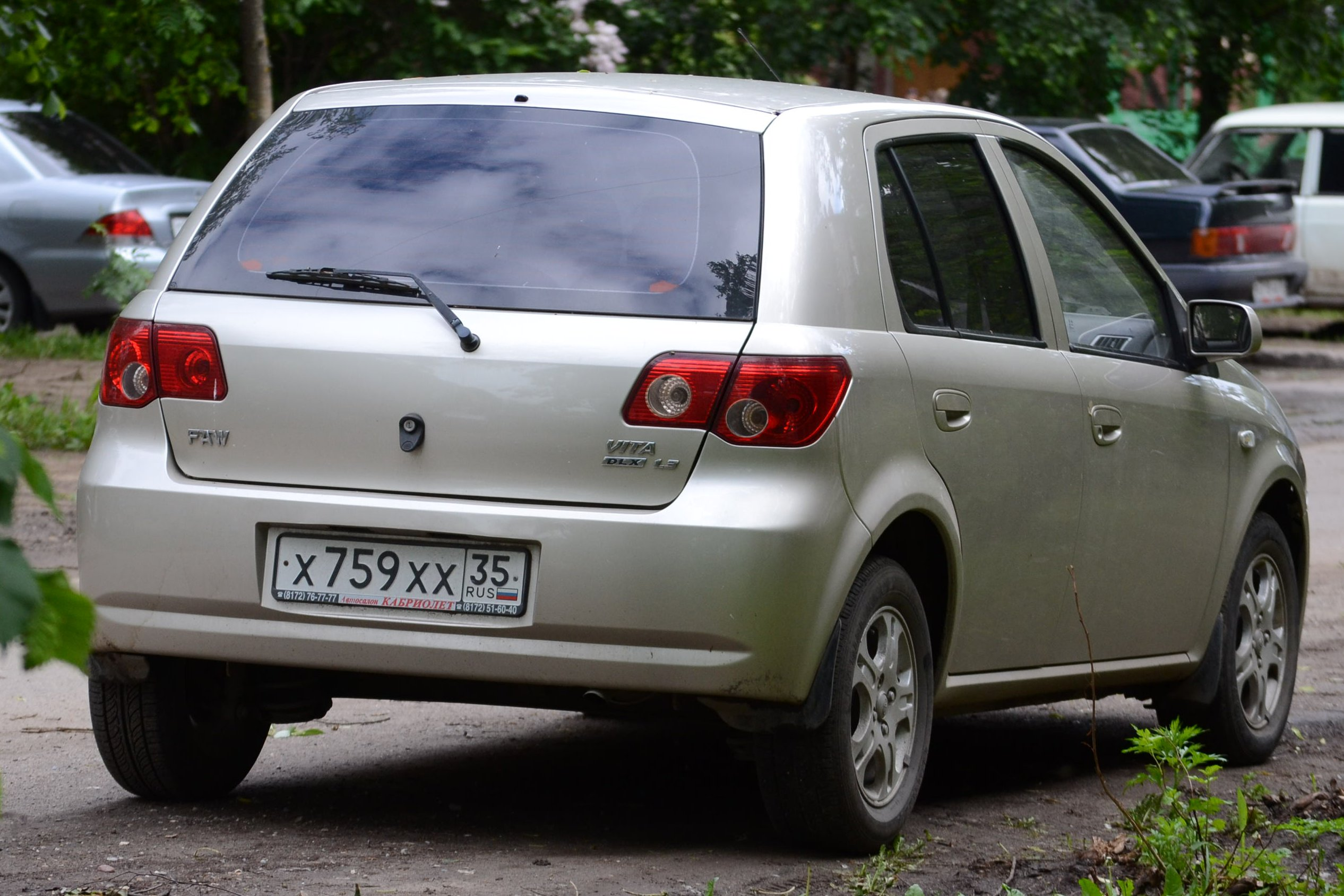
FAW Vita hatch rear

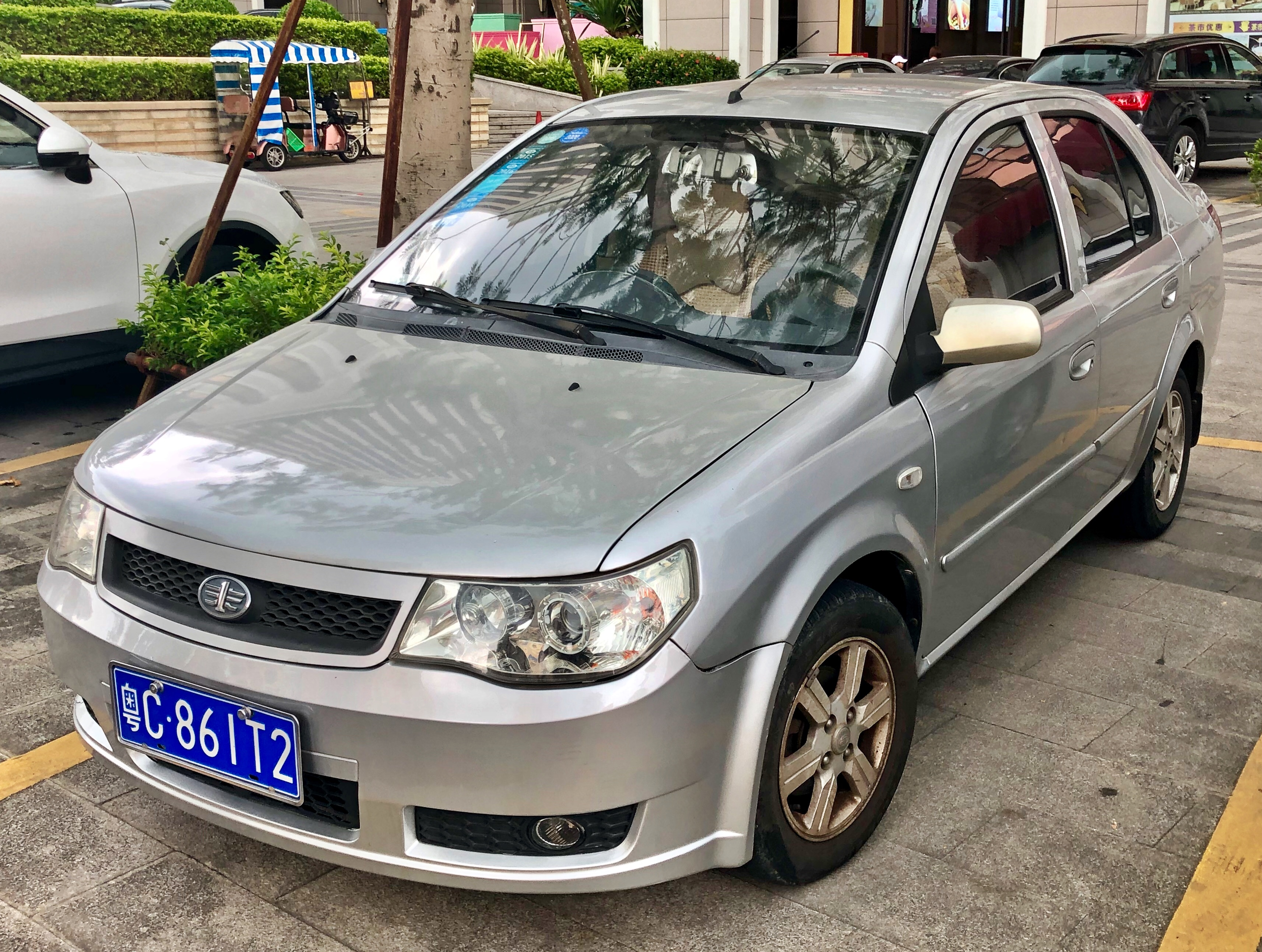
FAW Weizhi sedan (front）

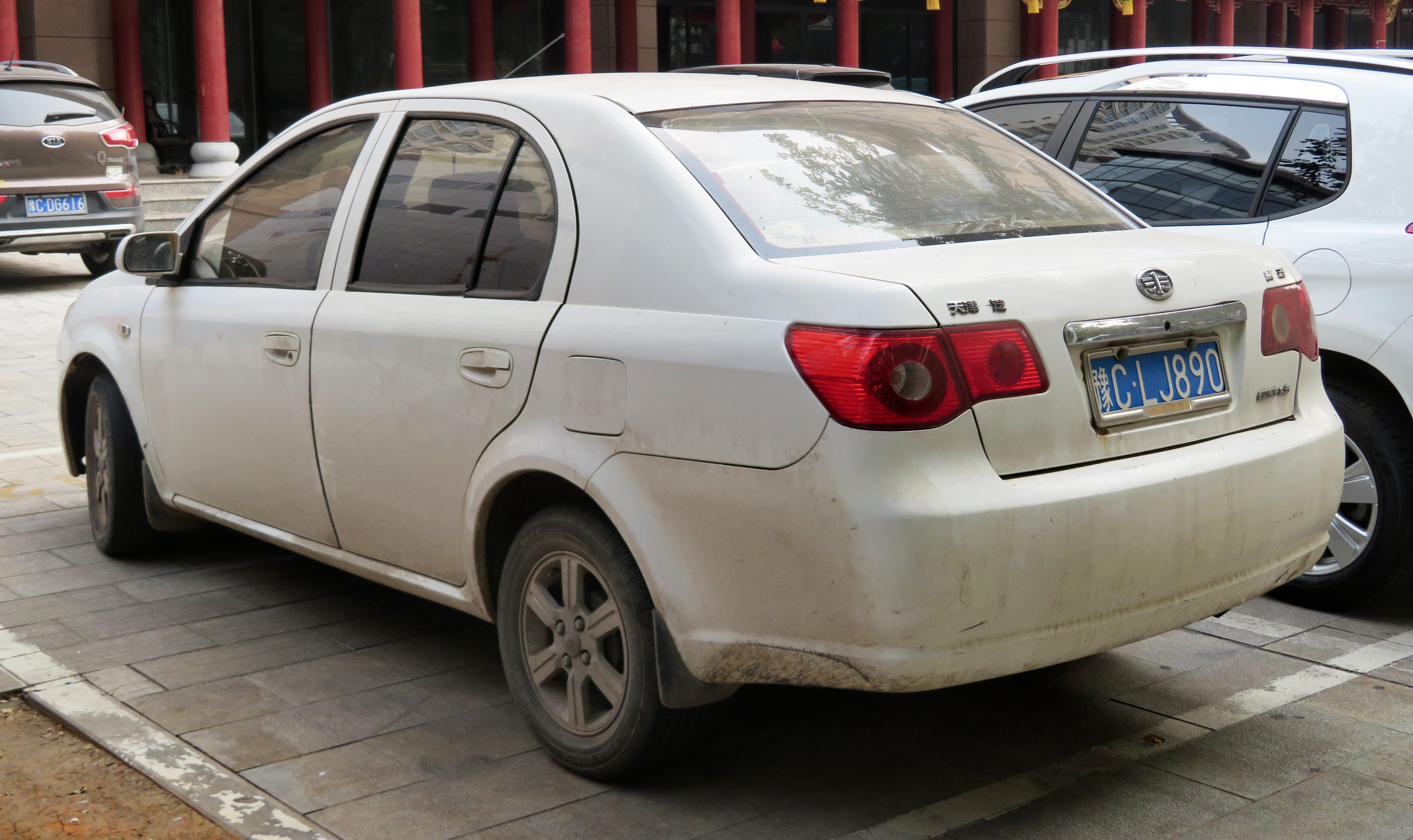
FAW Weizhi sedan (rear）

The FAW Vita is powered by the 5A-FE and 8A-FE engines from Toyota, which is a 1.5 liter 4-cylinder engine producing 75kW and 130 nm of torque. Transmission options for the Vita includes a 5-speed manual or 5-speed automatic. Price of the FAW Vita starts at 53,800 yuan and ends at 68,800 yuan.

A cross version called the FAW Vita V2 Cross was planned as well as of 2011, but the car was never produced, and the FAW-Tianjin brand was soon discontinued.

== FAW Vita V5 ==
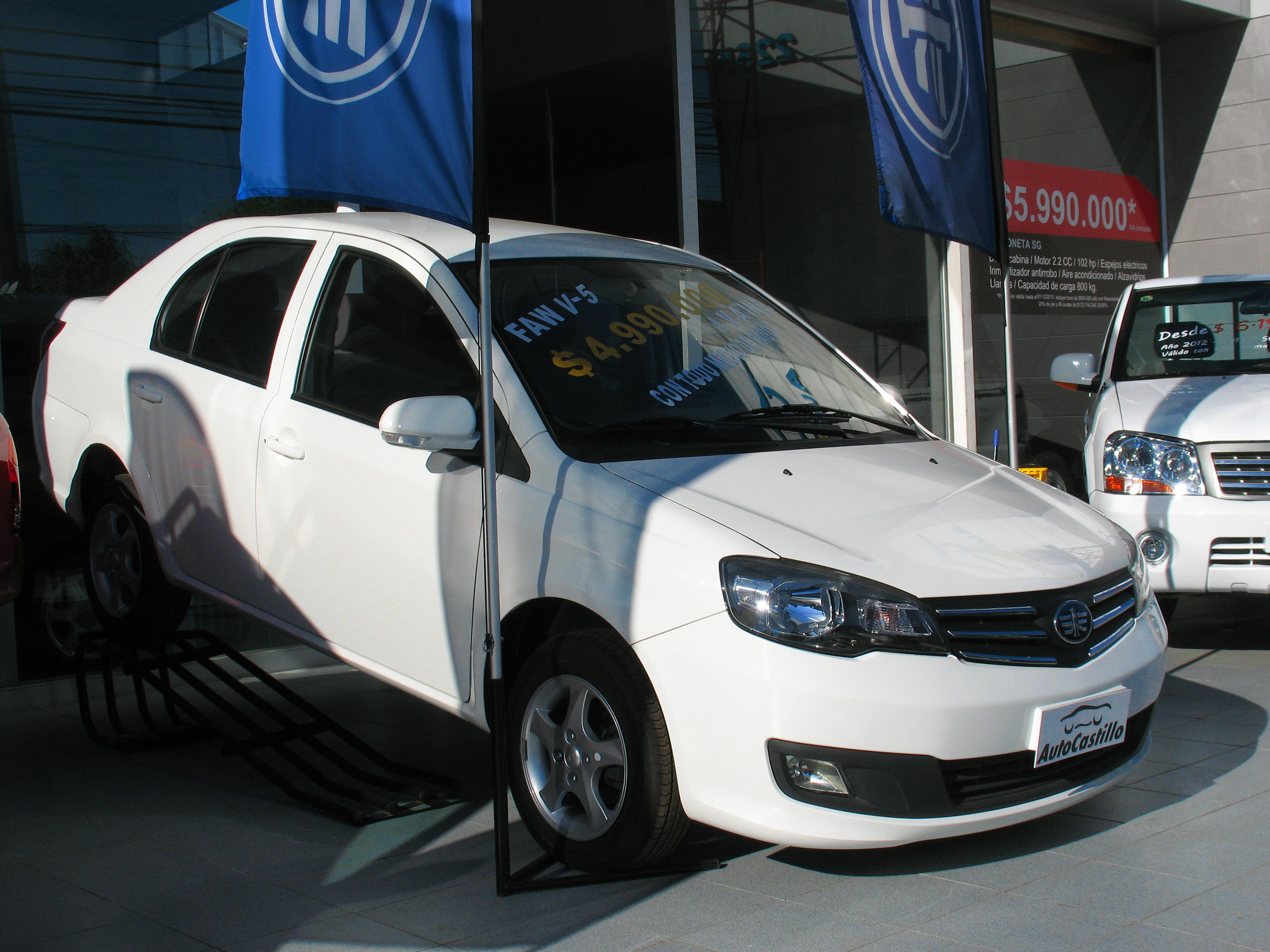
FAW Vita V5 1.5L

The FAW Weizhi C1 or Vita C1 (CA 7130 /CA 7140) name was also used in some markets, and after the discontinuation of the Vita hatchback in 2012, a facelift for the sedan version named the FAW Vita V5 (CA 7150 BUE) was sold from 2012 to 2015.
