= Xiali N5 =

Chinese subcompact sedan

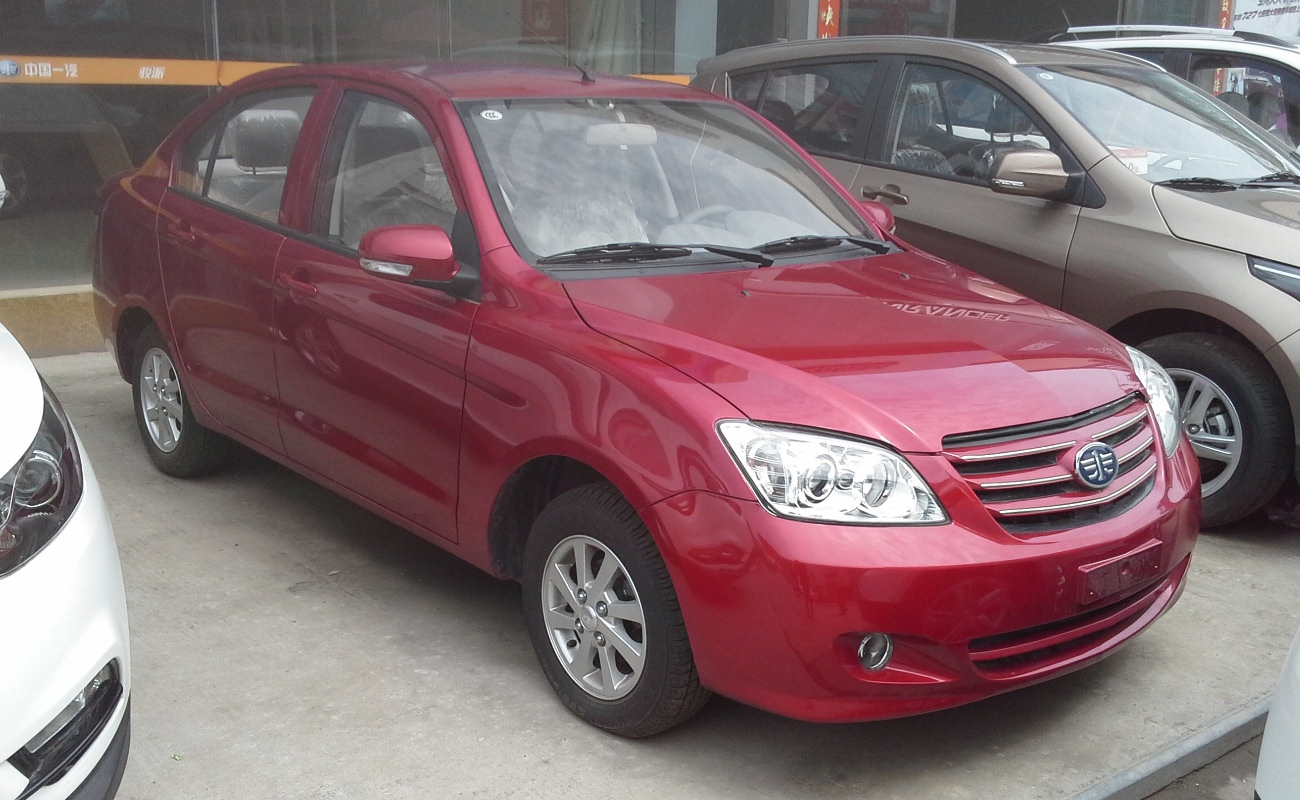

Overview
- Manufacturer: FAW Group (Tianjin FAW)
- Production: 2009–2017
- Assembly: Tianjin, China

Body and chassis
- Class: Subcompact sedan
- Body style: 4-door sedan
- Layout: Front-engine, front-wheel-drive

Powertrain
- Engine: 1.0 L I3 (petrol); 1.3 L I4 petrol
- Power output: 51–67 kW (68–90 hp)
- Transmission: 5-speed manual

Dimensions
- Wheelbase: 2,405 mm (94.7 in)
- Length: 4,155 mm (163.6 in)
- Width: 1,645 mm (64.8 in)
- Height: 1,435 mm (56.5 in)
- Curb weight: 945–965 kg (2,083–2,127 lb)

The Xiali N5 is a subcompact sedan produced by the Chinese automotive manufacturer FAW Group under the Xiali brand.

== Overview ==
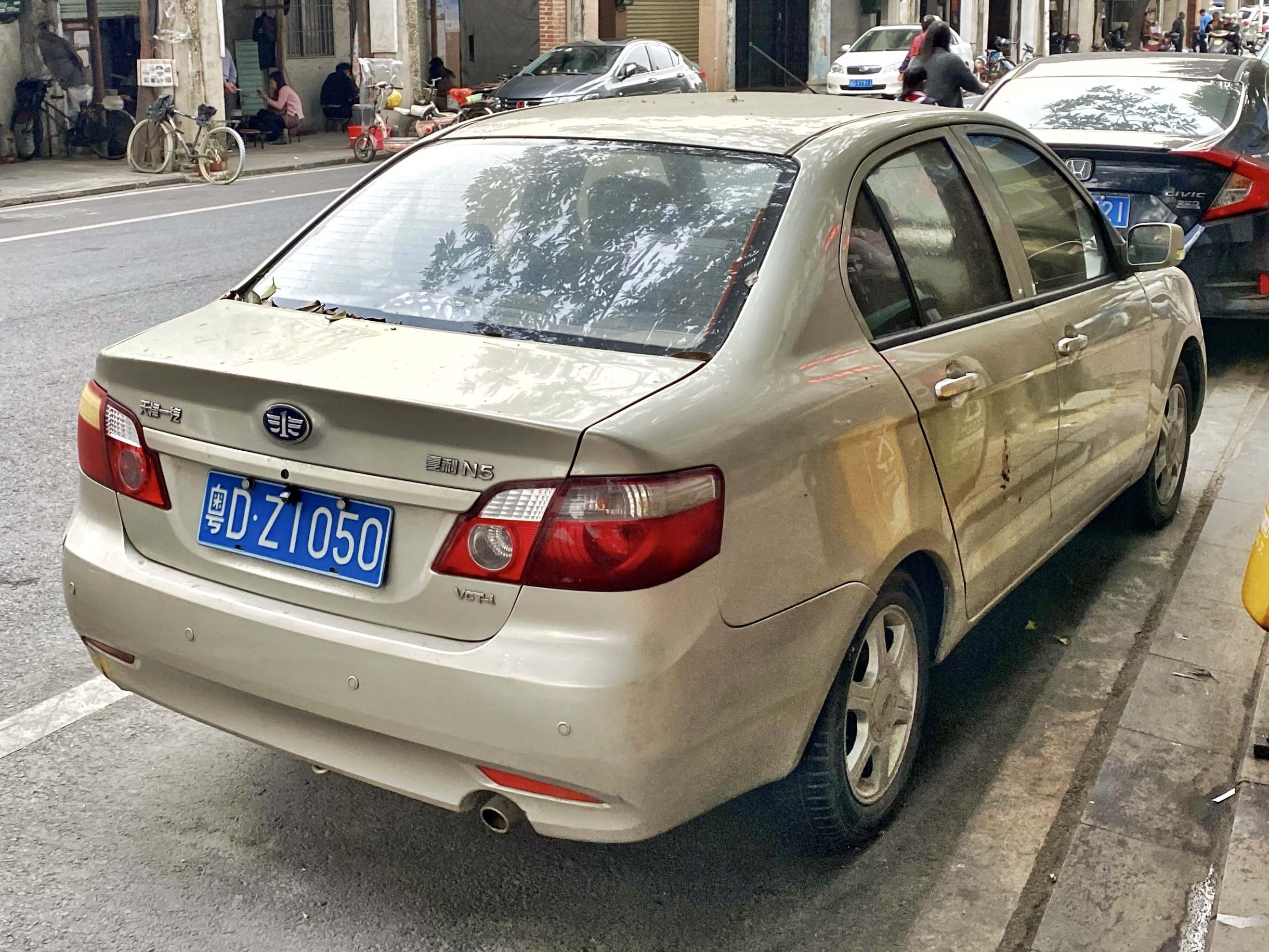
FAW Tianjin Xiali N5 rear

The N5 was released in 2009 and ranks in the class of supermini which was designed to replace both the Daihatsu Charade based Xiali N3 and the Toyota Platz based Xiali Vela. The hatchback sister model of the N5 was released a few years later. The Chinese N5 is only available as notchback versions, whereas the hatchback version is called Xiali N7. There was a facelift in 2013, where N5 received minor exterior updates and a brand new interior dashboard. The N5 was discontinued in 2017.

== Technical data ==
The sedan is powered by a 51 kW (68 hp) strong one-liter petrol engine with three cylinders or a 67 kW (90 hp) strong 1.3 liter gasoline engine with four cylinders.
