= China Railway Materials =

Chinese Railway Material Manufacturer

China Railway Materials Co., Ltd.
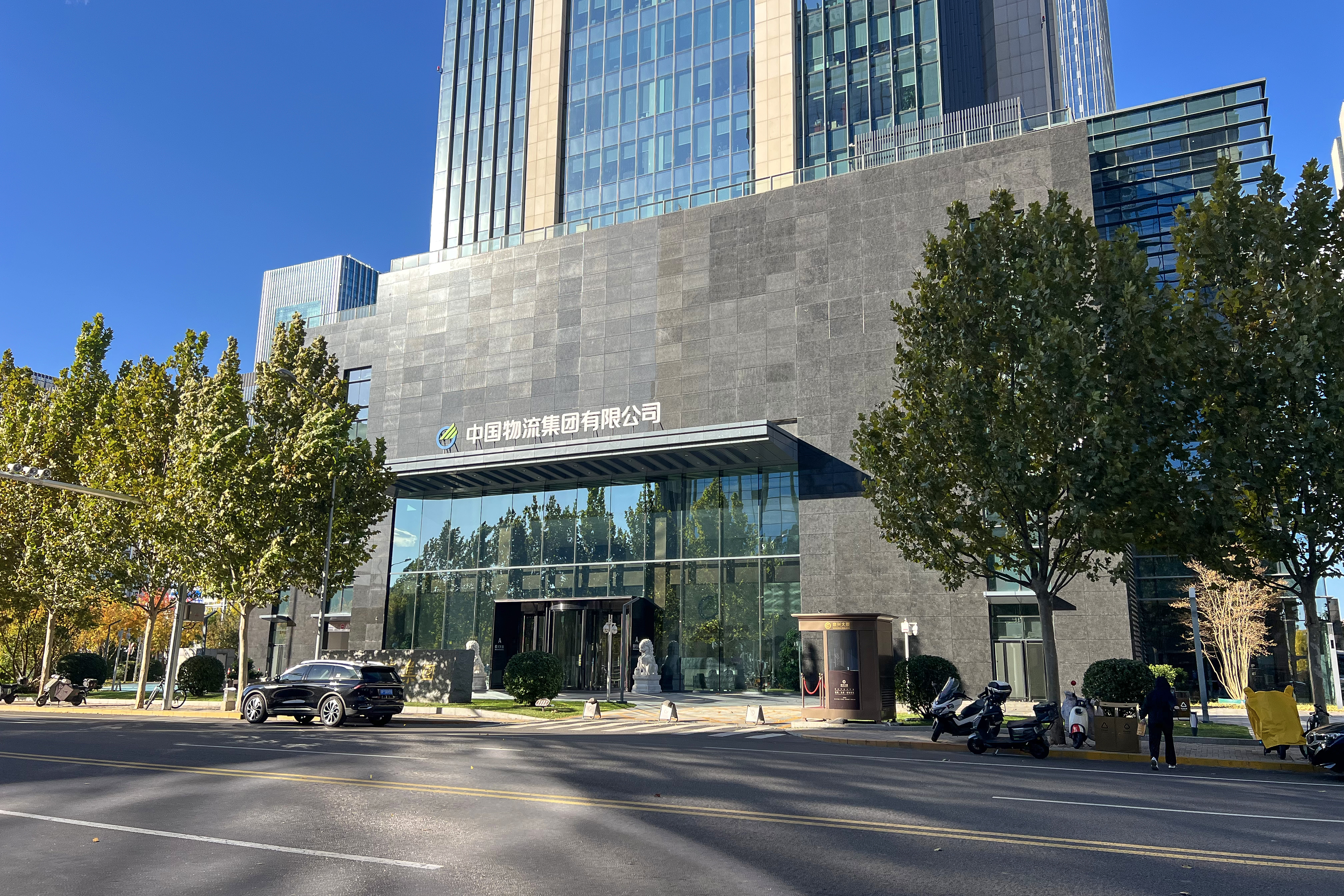
- Company type: State-owned
- Industry: Trading, Construction materials
- Headquarters: Beijing, China
- Products: Rail Track
- Revenue: ▼CN¥47.8 billion (2015)
- Net income: ▼ (CN¥448.6 million) (2015)
- Total assets: ▼CN¥54.6 billion (2015)
- Total equity: ▼CN¥5.2 billion (2015)
- Owner: Chinese government (100%)
- Parent: China Railway Materials Commercial Corp.
- Website: crmsc.com.cn

China Railway Materials Co., Ltd.
- Simplified Chinese: 中国铁路物资股份有限公司
- Traditional Chinese: 中國鐵路物資股份有限公司
Transcriptions

China Railway Materials Commercial Corp. (CRMCC, Chinese: 中国铁路物资(集团)总公司) is a state-owned company of China, under the supervision of State-owned Assets Supervision and Administration Commission of the State Council.

The predecessor of the group was the Materials Administration Bureau of the Ministry of Railways (Chinese: 铁道部物资管理局).

The major subsidiary of the group was China Railway Materials Co., Ltd. (CRM, Chinese: 中国铁路物资股份有限公司). In 2010, most of the assets of CRMCC was injected to CRM, excluding the investment vehicle of CRMCC: China Railway Materials Investment (Chinese: 中铁物总投资有限公司); A plan to float CRM in Shanghai and Hong Kong Stock Exchange was announced in the same year. However, the company did not proceed the initial public offering.

In 2014 CRMCC was renamed from Chinese: 中国铁路物资总公司 to current name Chinese: 中国铁路物资(集团)总公司.

The company was a partner of former Australian listed company FerrAUS Limited, Swiss company African Iron Ore Group and British listed company African Minerals Limited.

On December 3, 2021, after research and approval by the State-owned Assets Supervision and Administration Commission of the State Council and reported to the State Council, it was agreed that the logistics sectors of China Railway Materials Group and China Chengtong Holdings Group would be professionally integrated, and China Railway Materials Group would be renamed "China Logistics Group Co., Ltd.". The State-owned Assets Supervision and Administration Commission of the State Council will perform the duties of the investor of the integrated China Logistics Group on behalf of the State Council, and the equity of China Material Storage and Transportation Group Co., Ltd., Hong Kong China Travel China Merchants International Logistics Co., Ltd., China Logistics Co., Ltd., and China Packaging Co., Ltd. held by China Chengtong Group and its affiliated companies will be transferred to the integrated new group free of charge.

On December 6, 2021, the founding ceremony of China Logistics Group Co., Ltd. was held in Beijing. State Councilor Wang Yong (December 1955) attended the founding ceremony and unveiled the company. Secretary of the Party Committee and Director of the State-owned Assets Supervision and Administration Commission Hao Peng (1960) attended the meeting and delivered a speech. Member of the Party Committee and Deputy Director of the State-owned Assets Supervision and Administration Commission Weng Jieming presided over the meeting and read out the approval document of the State-owned Assets Supervision and Administration Commission of the State Council. Liu Shaoyong, Chairman of China Eastern Airlines, Zhu Bixin, Chairman of China Chengtong, and Li Hongfeng, Chairman of China Logistics Group, made speeches.
