= FAW Weizhi V2 =

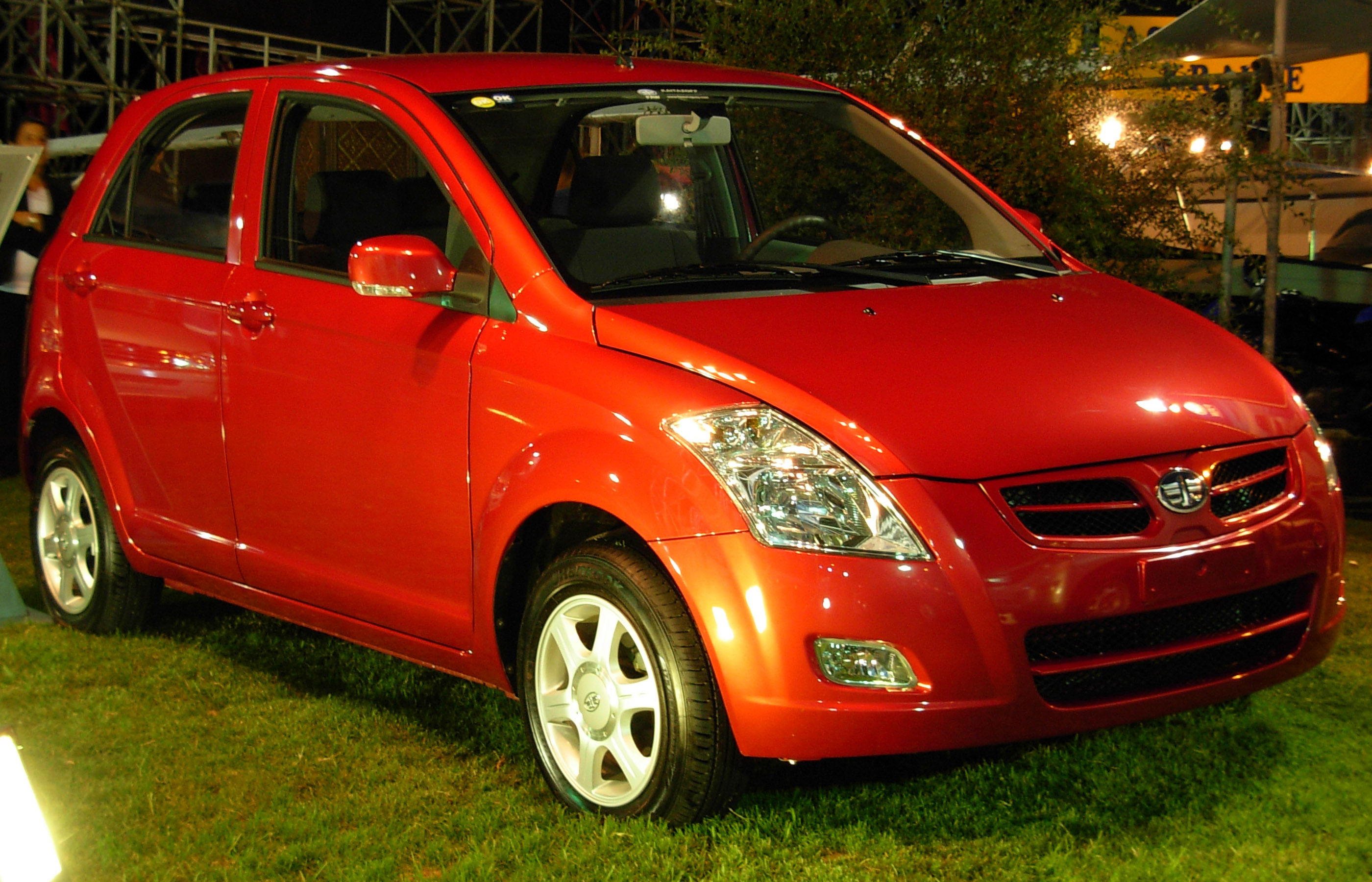

Overview
- Manufacturer: FAW Tianjin
- Also called: FAW Vizi V2
- Production: 2010–2013
- Assembly: Tianjin, China; Pakistan, Karachi

Body and chassis
- Class: Subcompact (B)
- Body style: 5-door hatchback
- Layout: FF layout

Powertrain
- Engine: 1.3 L CA4GA1 I4 (petrol)
- Transmission: 5-speed manual; 5-speed automatic

Dimensions
- Wheelbase: 2,450 mm (96.5 in)
- Length: 3,760 mm (148.0 in)
- Width: 1,680 mm (66.1 in)
- Height: 1,530 mm (60.2 in)

Chronology
- Predecessor: FAW Vita

The FAW Weizhi V2 (天津一汽-威志V2) or FAW Vizi V2 is a subcompact hatchback produced by FAW Group under the FAW Tianjin brand. A sedan version and a facelift version was also planned, but was never produced.

== Overview ==
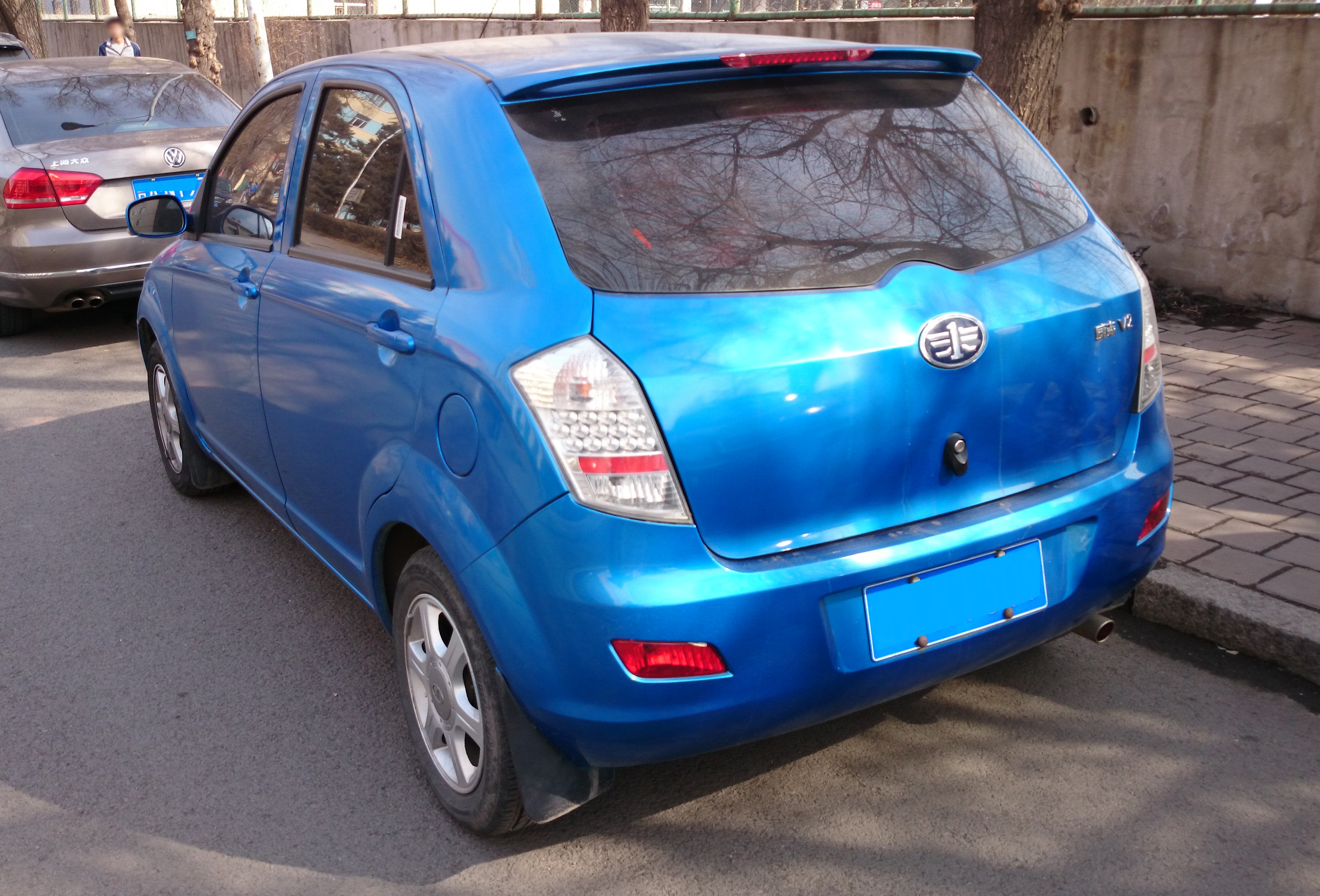
FAW V2 rear

The FAW Weizhi V2 is based on the FAW V1 concept that debuted during the 2008 Beijing Auto Show. The production version of the Weizhi V2 debuted during the 2010 Chengdu Auto Show on September 17, 2010, and was produced by the Tianjin-FAW factory in Tianjin.

The engine of the Weizhi V2 is a 1.3 liter producing 91 hp (67 kW) mated to a 5-speed automatic gearbox or 5-speed manual gearbox. Prices of the Weizhi V2 starts from 47,900 yuan to 53,900 yuan.

A cross version called the FAW Weizhi V2 Cross was launched in November 2011 featuring plastic claddings, rood rails and increased ground clearance. Price of the Weizhi V2 Cross starts at 43,900 yuan with the five-speed manual gearbox version and ends at 49,900 yuan for the 5-speed automatic gearbox version. Power of the Weizhi V2 Cross comes from a 1.3 liter engine producing 91 hp (67 kW) and 120 N⋅m (89 lb⋅ft).

South African Licensed FAW V2s
