= SEAT Cupra GT =

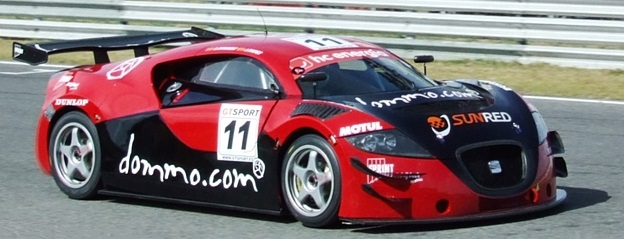

Overview
- Manufacturer: SEAT Sport
- Production: 2003

Body and chassis
- Body style: Coupé
- Layout: Rear mid-engine, rear-wheel-drive
- Related: Audi Le Mans quattro

Powertrain
- Engine: 2.995 L (182.8 cu in) V6 twin turbo Bore × stroke 82.5 mm × 92.8 mm (3.25 in × 3.65 in)
- Transmission: 6 speed Sequential

Dimensions
- Wheelbase: 2,650 mm (104.3 in)
- Length: 4,562 mm (179.6 in)
- Width: 2,100 mm (82.7 in)
- Height: 1,190 mm (46.9 in)
- Curb weight: 1,100 kg (2,425 lb)

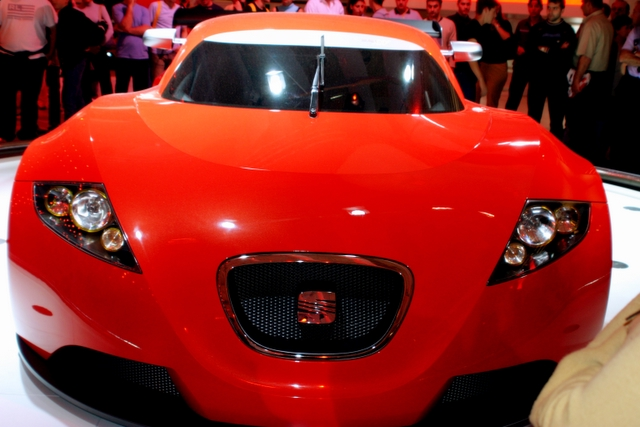
SEAT Cupra GT concept car, at the 2003 Barcelona Motor Show

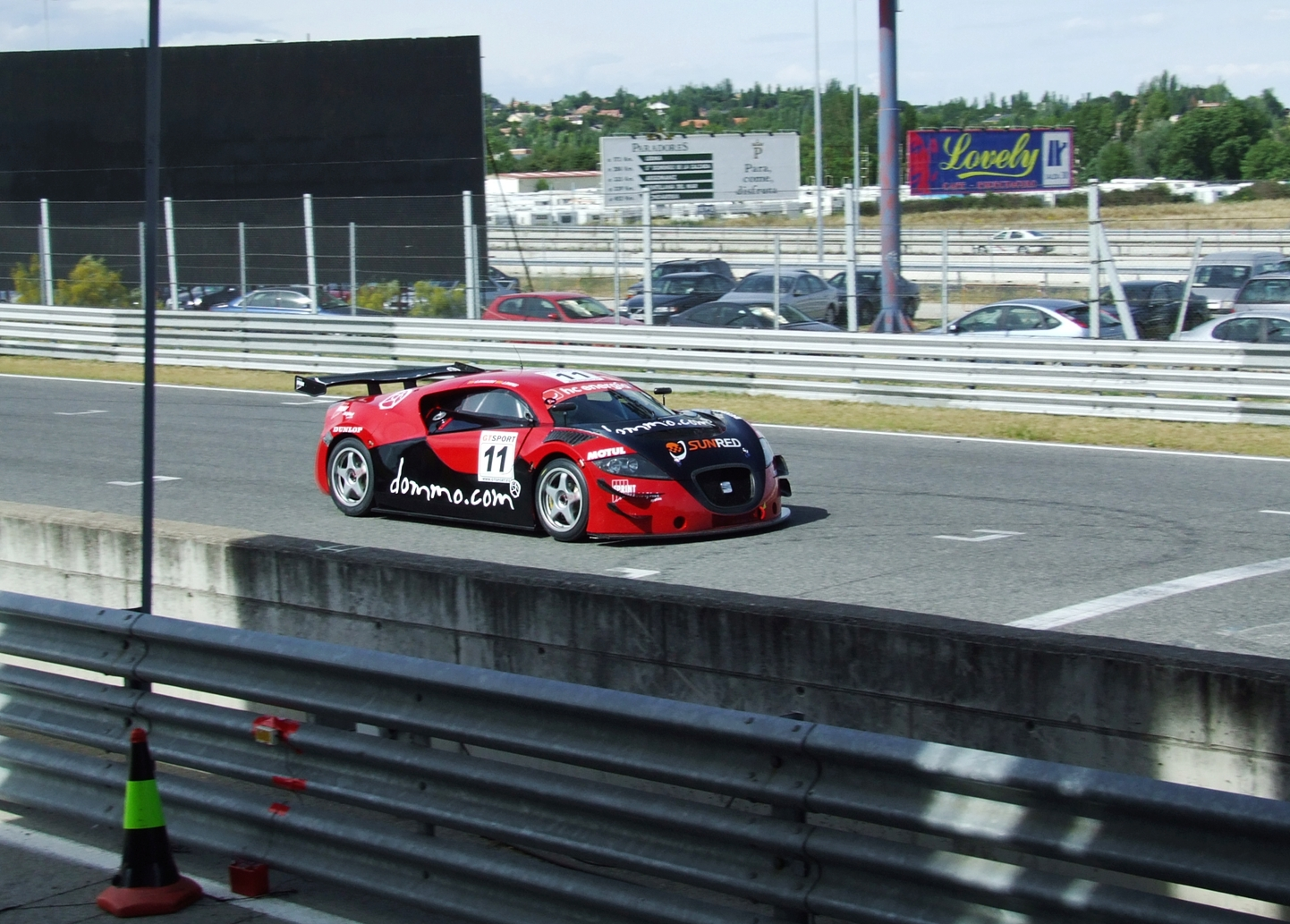
The SEAT Cupra GT in a qualifying session for the GTA category of the Spanish GT championship, driven by Ginés Vivancos and Joan Vinyes (Sun RED).

The SEAT Cupra GT is a GT race car made by SEAT and introduced in a world premiere first as a concept car on 24 April 2003 at the Barcelona Motor Show. The final version of the Cupra GT was presented later, produced on customer demand by the Spanish car manufacturer's SEAT Sport division in a limited series addressed to racing teams or individuals aiming to participate in GT races like the Spanish GT Championship.

The SEAT Sport division has worked with the SEAT Design Center in Sitges, in order to create the racer with the design essence of the SEAT Salsa and SEAT Tango concept cars. Thus the SEAT Cupra GT incorporates the brand's 'auto emoción' philosophy, featuring the distinctive Walter de Silva's curved 'Dynamic Line' descending on the sides of the car from the front to the rear.

== Engine ==
Being a sports car and nicknamed Spanish Ferrari, it is powered by a 2,995 cc V6 twin turbo 4 valves/cylinder DOHC petrol Audi engine with an output of over 500 hp (373 kW) and a peak torque of 600 N⋅m (440 lb⋅ft) at 5250 rpm. The motor is placed longitudinally at rear central position and the output is being routed through a rear-wheel drive layout including a 6 speed sequential transmission.

== Suspension, brakes and tires ==
The Cupra GT, by the time it was presented as a concept car, was equipped with independent double wishbones with Öhlins coil shock absorbers, all-round ventilated disc brakes (378 mm (14.9 in) front, 355 mm (14.0 in) rear) with Brembo's AP Racing brake calipers painted in a dark titanium nuance, and tires (265/650 front, 285/680 rear) mounted to titanium coloured six double spoke 18' alloy wheels. Intended to run in GT races, the car's wheels were secured with a single bolt saving time during the wheel changes.

== Performance ==
The high performance of the Cupra GT is marked by the estimated top speed of 295 km/h (183 mph), while the standard discipline of sprinting from a standing start to 100 km/h (62.1 mph) is being completed in 4.2 seconds.
