= SEAT Altea Prototipo =

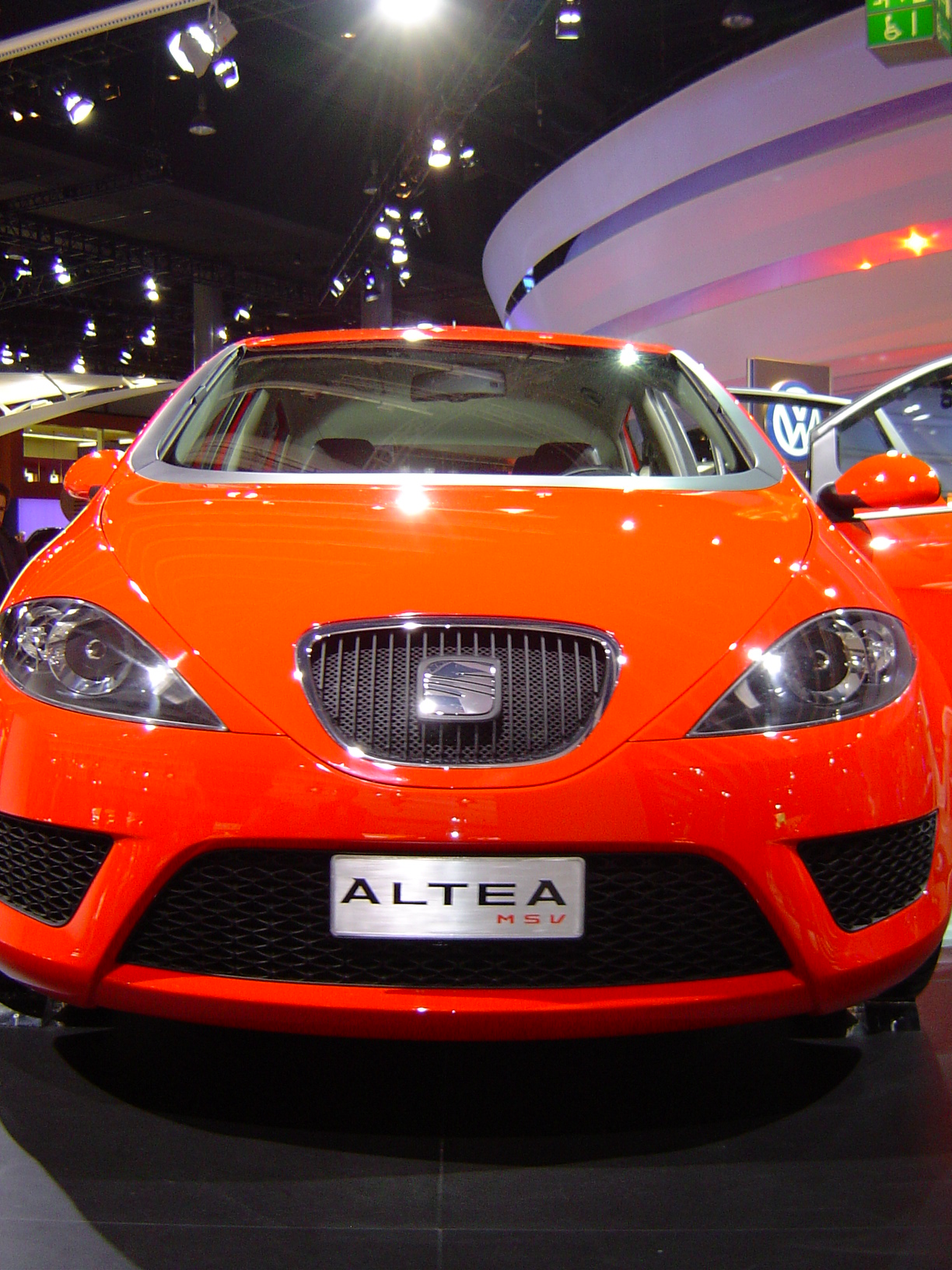

Overview
- Manufacturer: SEAT, SA
- Also called: SEAT Altea Prototype
- Production: 2003
- Designer: Walter de Silva

Body and chassis
- Class: Concept car
- Body style: 5-door 2+2 seater
- Layout: front engine transverse
- Related: SEAT Altea; Audi A3 Mk2

Powertrain
- Engine: 2.0 L (120 cu in) FSI
- Transmission: 6-speed Tiptronic

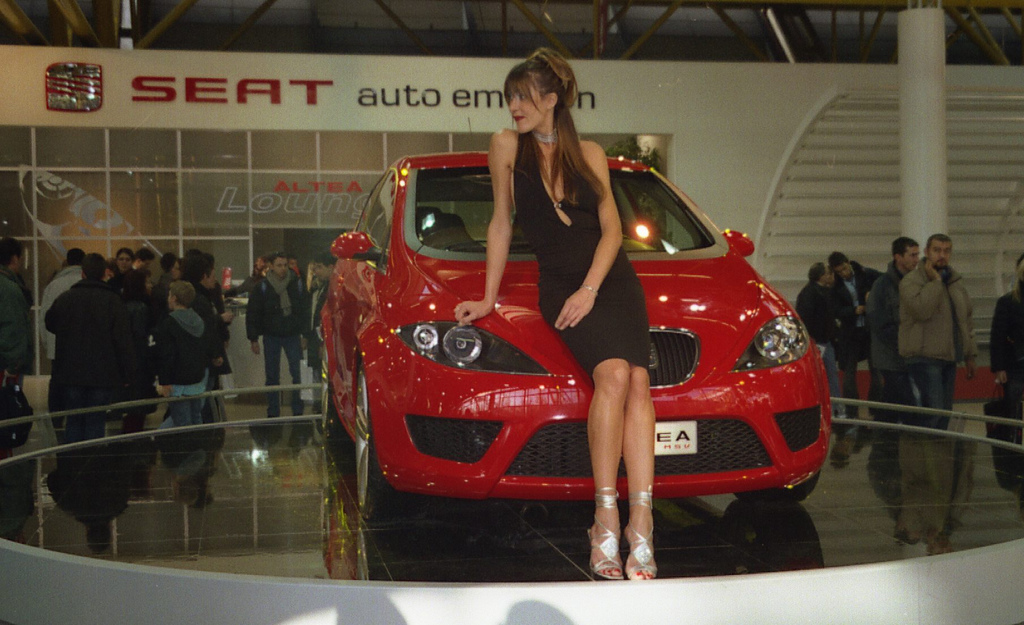
SEAT Altea Prototipo, at the 2003 Bologna Motor Show

The SEAT Altea Prototipo is a 2+2 seater concept car presented by SEAT for the first time at the 2003 Frankfurt Motor Show, the first SEAT model to be produced inside the Audi brand group, which was unveiled with the aim to give a preview of the SEAT Altea's definitive road version, which was meant to be launched a year later in 2004.

Designed by Walter de Silva and belonging to what the Spanish car maker claims to be a 'Multi Sport Vehicle' (MSV) class denomination for a sporty single-volume people carrier, it has been named after the city of Altea in the Alicante province of Spain.

The Altea Prototipo incorporates the new SEAT's design direction trend reflecting the 'SEAT auto emoción' philosophy, which was shown for the first time in the 2000 SEAT Salsa concept car, moreover featuring the characteristic for the brand lateral curved descending lines as well as the new front radiator grille.

Other interesting points are the windscreen wipers resting at vertical position, the non visible exterior rear door handles, and the Agile Chassis or Dynamic steering response (DSR) system meaning special suspension settings and fittings combined with an electronic programme that regulates power steering response according to driving and steering speed.

== Awards ==
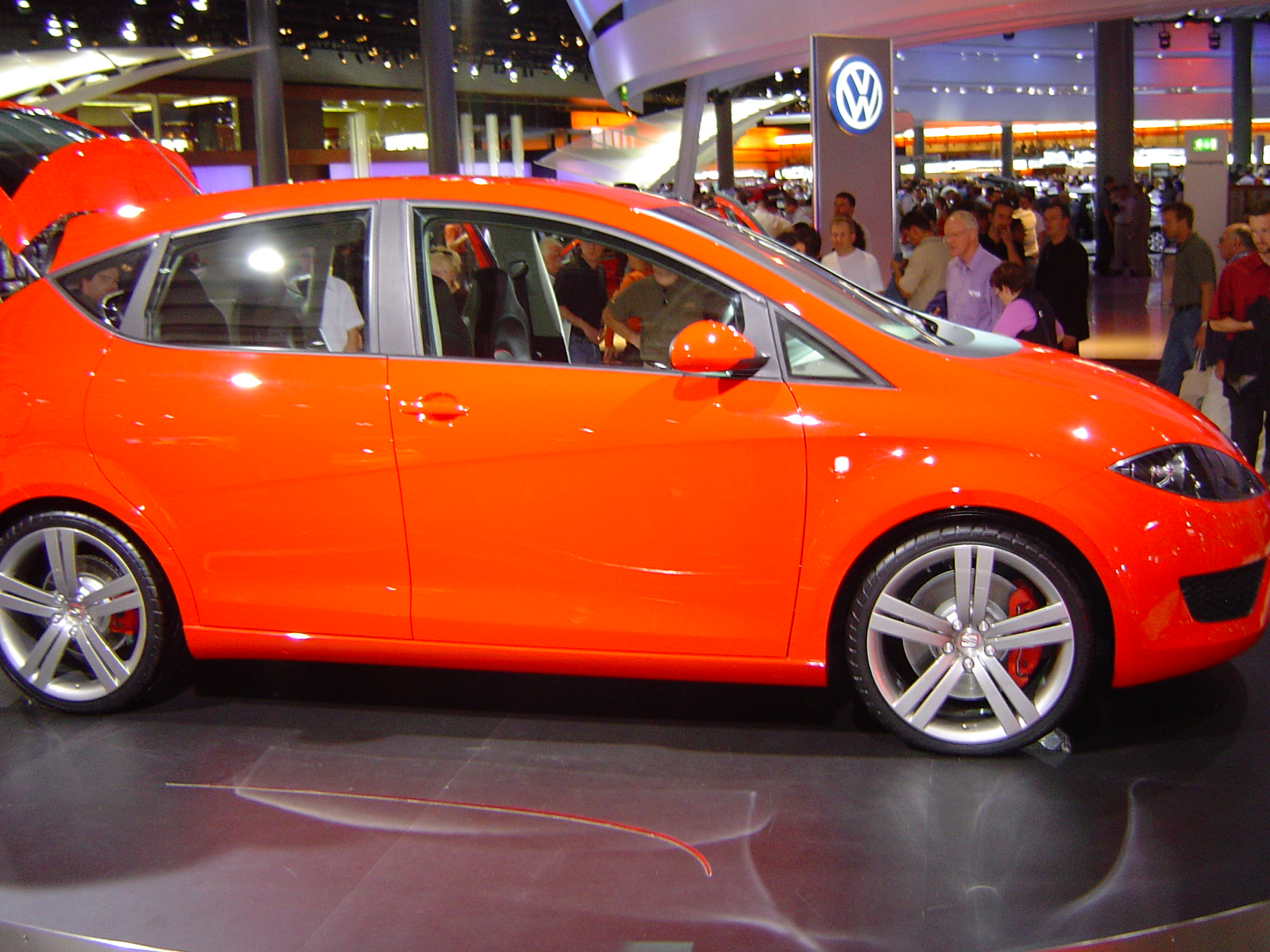
SEAT Altea Prototipo, side view

- 'Best Concept Car in 2003', by the Designers (Europe) organisation

== Powertrain ==
Another novelty for the Altea Prototipo is found under the bonnet, it is the first model of SEAT to be powered by a direct injection petrol engine.

- Type: FSI (Fuel Stratified Injection) Inline 4 cylinder petrol engine
- Displacement : 2.0L
- Power hp at RPM: 150 / 6,000

== Transmission ==
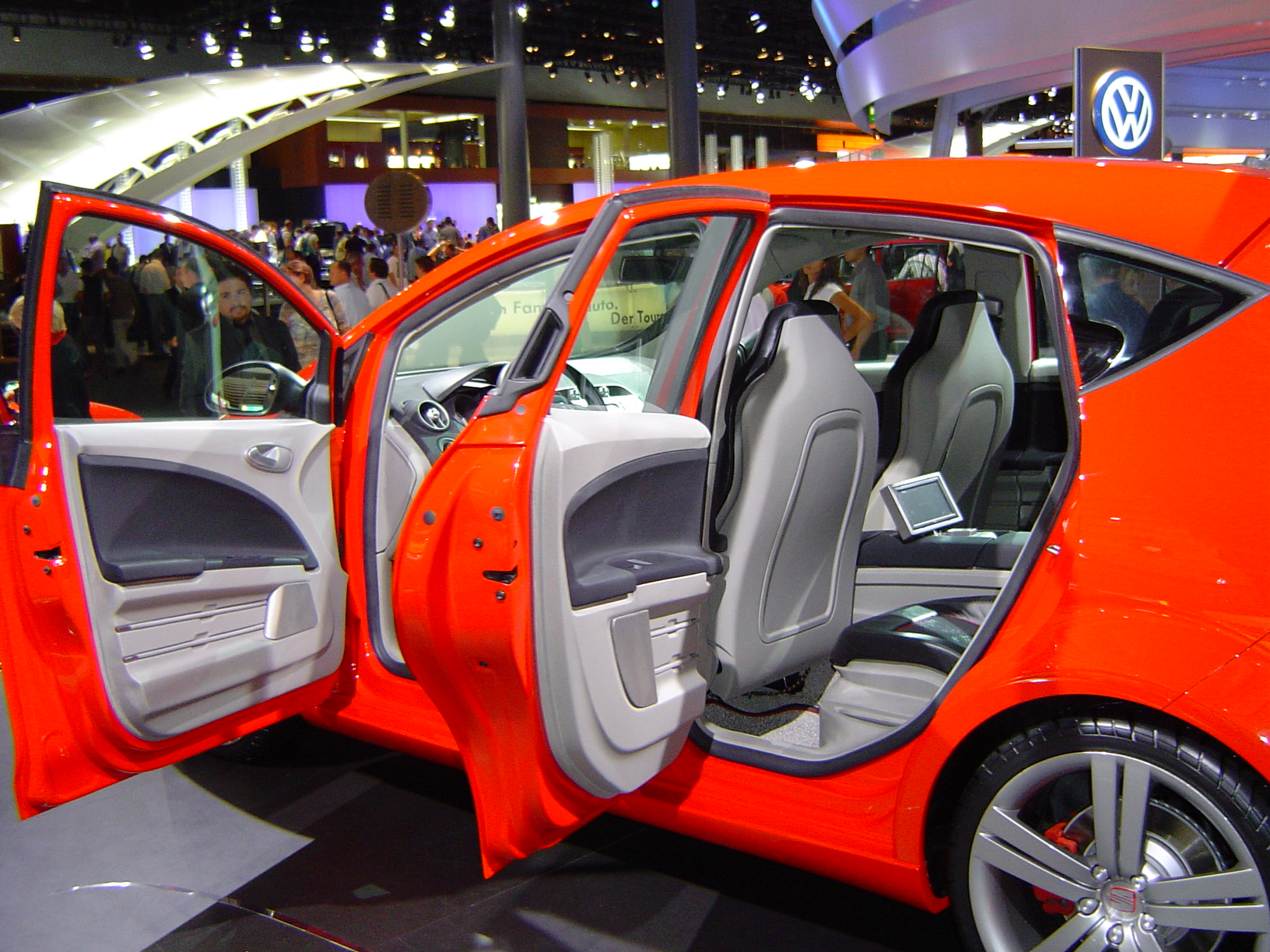
SEAT Altea Prototipo, interior view with open doors

Six speed automatic and sequential Tiptronic gearbox.

== Suspension, brakes and tires ==
The Altea Prototipo is built on a new platform, sharing components with the Audi A3 Mark II.

- Driveline: front wheel drive
- Suspension: front MacPherson struts/rear multilink axle
- Tires: 8.5J x 19h inch low profile alloy wheels
- Brakes front/rear: vented disc/vented disc, ABS – Electronic Stability Program (ESP)
