= SEAT Tango =

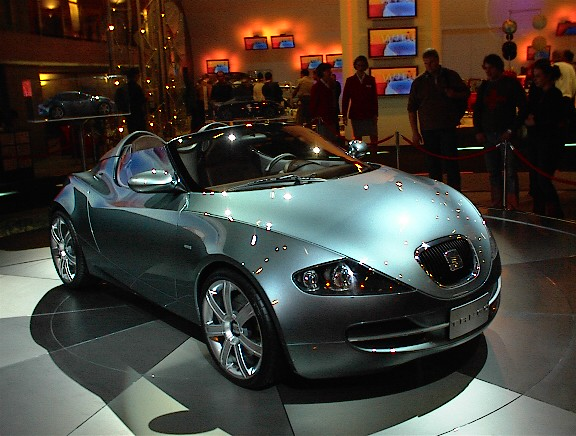

Overview
- Manufacturer: SEAT, SA
- Production: 2001
- Designer: Walter de Silva

Body and chassis
- Class: Concept car, sports car
- Body style: 2-door 2-seat roadster
- Layout: front engine transverse

Powertrain
- Engine: 1.8 L (110 cu in) 20 valve Turbocharged I4, DOHC
- Transmission: 6-speed manual

Dimensions
- Wheelbase: 2,200 mm (86.6 in)
- Length: 3,685 mm (145.1 in)
- Width: 1,714 mm (67.5 in)
- Height: 1,181 mm (46.5 in)
- Curb weight: 1,150 kg (2,540 lb)

The SEAT Tango roadster is a concept car presented at the 2001 Frankfurt Motor Show, designed by a team directed by Walter de Silva with the contribution of SEAT's chief of exterior design, Steve Lewis.

Featuring a two-door two-seater roadster body style riding on a cut-down SEAT Ibiza platform, it is powered by a 180 PS (132 kW; 178 hp) version of Volkswagen Group's 1.8L 20VT engine which drives the front wheels. While it was an internal concept, it was originally intended to be called the Tanga because of its rear end lines, however that name was turned down by Volkswagen Group's management as it was found rather provocative.

Extensive safety measures were also integrated into the project: in addition to the progressive deformation structure and central passenger cell which help to cushion impact, it was also equipped with twin front airbags, side airbags, Anti-lock Braking System, Electronic Stability Control and Traction Control systems.

== Potential production ==
The SEAT Tango was for a long time the subject of speculation on whether would become a production model. Although supported by SEAT's (and later Volkswagen Group's) chairman Bernd Pischetsrieder, and an important model in order to boost the brand's auto emoción sporting image and the overwhelming response from the public, the Tango never got the green light for production: SEAT's integration in the following years in the 'Audi brand group' meant that decisions had to be made in consensus with guidance from Audi's management. However Audi was opposed to making the Tango a real road car at all costs according to Audi board chairman Martin Winterkorn who announced "I am not signing a production contract with blood until I see the right numbers." and instead favoured new models in segments that were thought to make more sense in sales terms, like the SEAT Altea MPV which was meant to succeed Audi's own Audi A2 model.

== Awards ==
- 'Autonis award 2002' for the concept car category

== Engine ==
- Type: 20 valve Turbocharged Inline 4 cylinder DOHC
- Displacement cu in (cc): 110 ( 1781 )
- Power bhp (kW) at RPM: 177.5 ( 132.4 ) / 5600
- Torque ft·lbf (Nm) at RPM: 173 ( 235.0 ) / 2100-5000

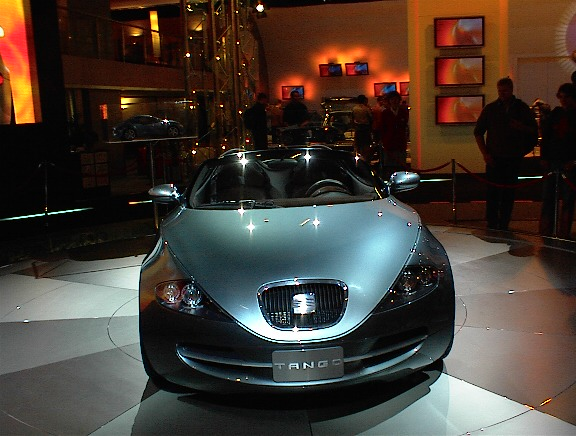
The SEAT Tango roadster presented at the 2001 Frankfurt Motor Show

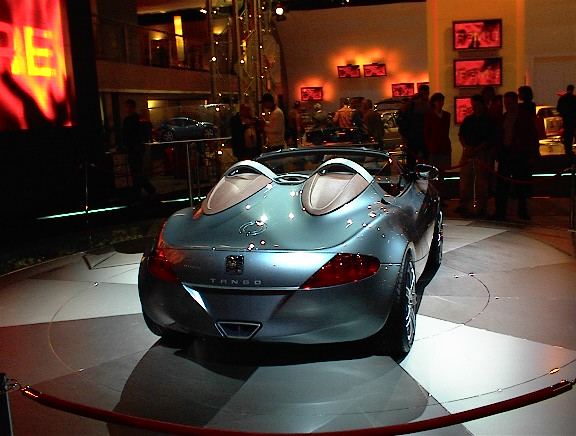
SEAT Tango, rear view

== Suspension, brakes and tires ==
- Driveline: front wheel drive
- Suspension: front MacPherson struts / rear suspension with a degree of self steer
- Brakes front/rear: vented disc / disc, ABS-ESC-TCS

== Exterior dimensions and weight ==
- Length × Width × Height in: 145.1 × 67.5 × 46.5
- Weight lb (kg): 2535 ( 1150 )

== Performance ==
- Acceleration 0–100 km/h s: 7.0
- Top Speed mph (km/h): 146 ( 235 )

== Derivatives ==
Based on the SEAT Tango roadster, there have been some more derivative models:

- SEAT Tango spyder
- SEAT Tango coupé
- SEAT Tango Racer
