= Lamborghini Miura concept =

Lamborghini Miura Concept
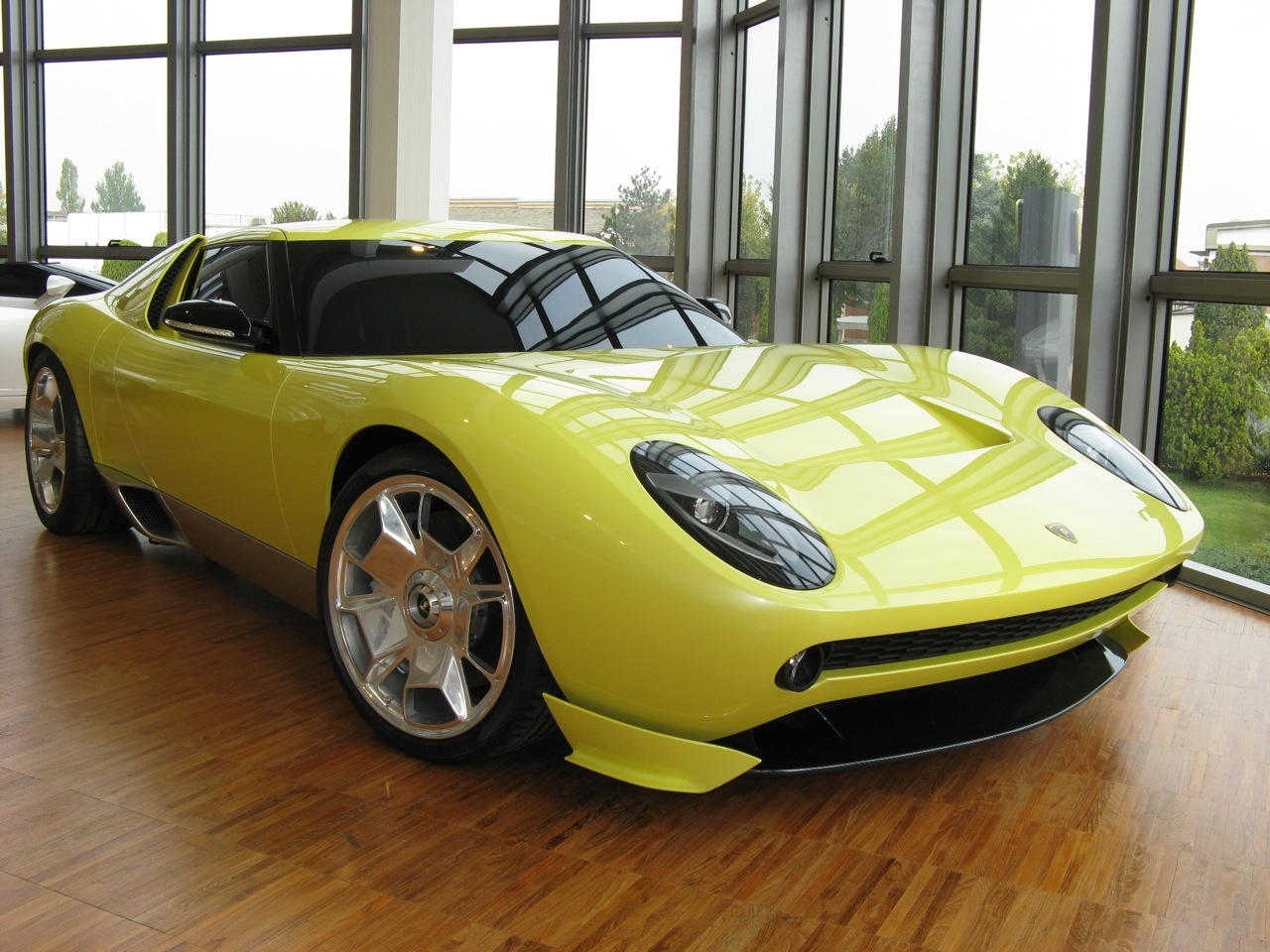
- Miura Concept at the Lamborghini Museum

Overview
- Manufacturer: Lamborghini
- Production: 2006
- Assembly: Sant'Agata Bolognese, Italy
- Designer: Walter de'Silva

Body and chassis
- Class: Concept car
- Body style: 2-door coupé
- Layout: Mid-engine, four-wheel-drive layout
- Platform: Lamborghini Murciélago
- Related: Lamborghini Miura

Powertrain
- Engine: 6,498 cc (6.5 L; 396.5 cu in) LP640 V12
- Transmission: 6-speed e-gear automated manual

The Lamborghini Miura Concept is a retro styled concept car introduced by Lamborghini in 2006 and built to commemorate the 40th anniversary of the introduction of the original Miura concept at the Geneva Motor Show in 1966.

Codenamed "Concept M" internally, the project began in October 2003 and was the first design to be led by Lamborghini's then new design chief, Walter de'Silva. The show car emulates the design of the original Miura, while its underpinnings are that of the more modern Murciélago. The car was first presented at the Paley Center for Media, formerly The Museum of Television & Radio, on 5 January 2006. The unveiling coincided with the Los Angeles Auto Show though it was not present at the show itself. It made its official début at the North American International Auto Show in Detroit two weeks later.

Lamborghini president and CEO Stefan Winkelmann stated that the concept would not mark the Miura's return to production, saying that "the Miura was a celebration of our history, but Lamborghini is about the future. Retro design is not what we are here for. So we won't do the Miura."

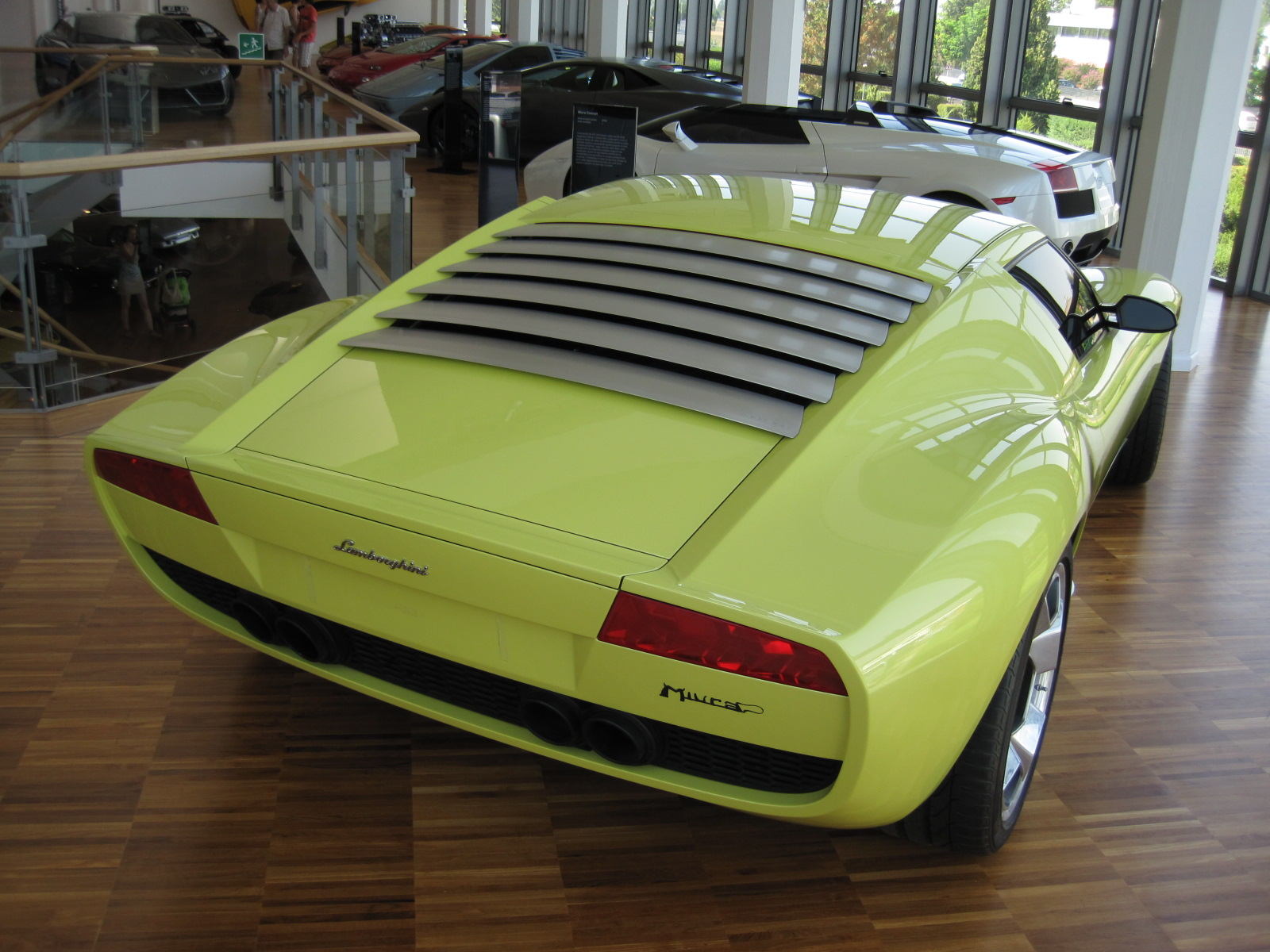
Rear view

The Miura concept is now on display at the Lamborghini Museum in Sant'Agata Bolognese, Italy.
