= Walter de Silva =

Italian car designer

Walter Maria de Silva
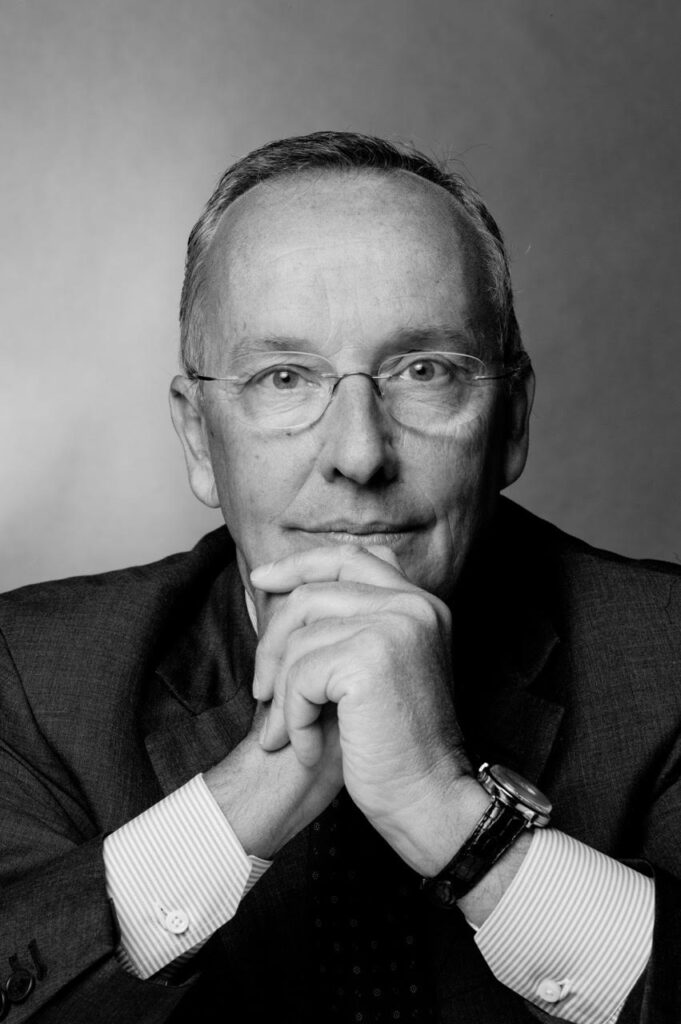
- Born: 27 February 1951 (age 75); Lecco, Italy
- Education: Royal College of Art
- Occupation: Designer
- Years active: 1972–present
- Children: 5
- Website: walterdesilva.com

Signature
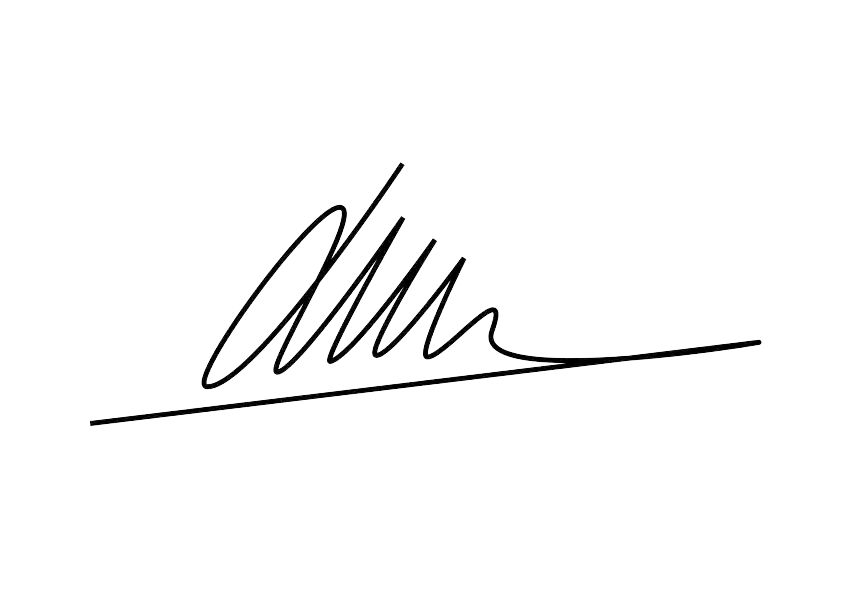

Walter Maria de Silva (born 27 February 1951) is an Italian car designer and former head of Volkswagen Group Design, until 2015. Since beginning his car design career in 1972 as trainee car designer for Fiat's Style Centre, De Silva has also worked as a designer at I.DE.A Institute, and as head of design for Alfa Romeo, SEAT and the 'Audi brand group'. He is presently President of the Design Studio Walter De Silva Automotive.

== Early life ==
De Silva was born in Lecco, near Milan, Italy. He was an avid sketcher starting from young age. His father Emilio was a graphic designer working as an executive for Fiat's marketing department. De Silva graduated from the Royal College of Art with a degree in automotive design.

== Career ==
=== Fiat, 1972–1975 ===
Walter de Silva began his career in 1972 at age 21, working for Centro Stile Fiat.

=== I.DE.A. Institute, 1977–1986 ===
After his experience at Fiat, Walter de Silva worked at Rodolfo Bonetto on designing automotive interior. In 1977 he began working at the I.DE.A Institute in Turin, Italy, continuing for nine years under the direction of Franco Mantegazza and Renzo Piano and eventually becoming a director at I.DE.A.

=== Alfa Romeo, 1986–1999 ===
In 1986 Walter de Silva was recruited away from the I.DE.A. Institute to become head of Centro Stile Alfa Romeo. Walter de Silva remained in this role until 1999.

At Alfa Romeo, de Silva led the renewal of the brand's design language and repositioning.

=== SEAT, 1999–2002 ===
In 1999 Ferdinand Piëch assigned Walter de Silva to work for the Volkswagen Group SEAT division, with the aim of injecting verve and sportiness to SEAT design. The result was SEAT 'auto emoción' philosophy which was first demonstrated in the 2000 SEAT Salsa and the 2001 SEAT Tango concept cars, as a foretaste of SEAT new design language, with the latter receiving in 2002 the 'Autonis Award' in the Concept Car category. His more expressive design approach has since influenced the form and look of numerous cars, such as the 2002 SEAT Córdoba and SEAT Ibiza, as well as the 2004 SEAT Altea and 2005 SEAT León which were highly acclaimed and subsequently received several design awards (e.g. Red dot design award, Autonis award, 'The World's Most Beautiful Automobile 2004' award in Milan, etc.). During his time at SEAT, de Silva was approached by Volkswagen head of design Hartmut Warkuß, and commissioned to submit a new Bugatti design for the upcoming revival of the brand. De Silva's design was rejected in favour of Warkuß's own design, which would later become the Bugatti Veyron.

=== Audi brand group, 2002–2007 ===
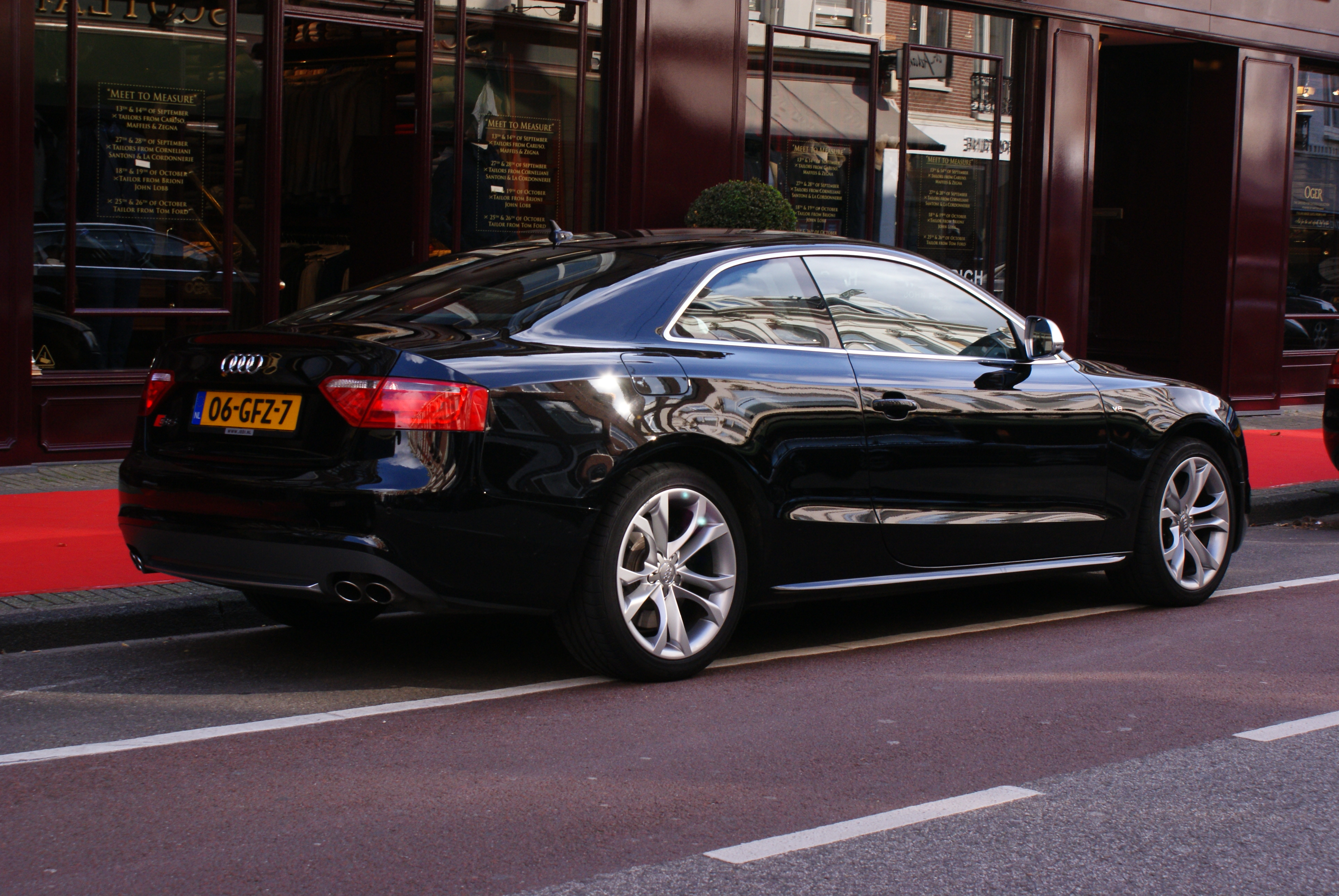
Audi A5 (S5)

In March 2002 Walter de Silva was appointed Head of Design to the now-defunct Audi brand group which encompassed the Audi, SEAT and Lamborghini brands. Volkswagen Group management charged de Silva with giving the Audi range a more emotional design language which included the controversial introduction of the full-height, single-frame front grille that now adorns all Audi models. His first full design for a production Audi was the 2005 A6. He since went on to contribute to the 2005 Audi Q7, 2006 Audi TT and the 2007 Audi A5, which he called 'the most beautiful car he ever designed.'

=== Volkswagen Group, 2007–2015 ===
Following the appointment of former Audi chairman Martin Winterkorn as the chairman of the Volkswagen Group in January 2007, de Silva was appointed as Head of Volkswagen Group Design effective from 1 February 2007 and was responsible for the overall strategic design direction of all VW passenger car brands including Škoda, SEAT, Volkswagen, Audi, Bentley, Lamborghini and Bugatti. de Silva replaced Murat Günak and his first task was to re-evaluate the designs of three then-imminent Volkswagen models which had been penned by his predecessor: the 2008 Golf, the 2008 Passat CC and the 2008 Scirocco.

=== Walter De Silva Automotive, 2019–present ===
After some time of inactivity, Walter De Silva launched Walter De Silva & Partners with other designers, later rebranded as Walter De Silva Automotive. This new company offers services of design consultancy to car manufacturers with a strong focus on brand & product identity. Their first project after leaving the VW Group was the ECF Concept car presented at the 2019 Geneva Motor Show for the Chinese manufacturer Arcfox. With his partners, Walter De Silva was later in charge of the design of the Hongqi S9 designed for SilkFAW presented at the 2021 Shanghai Auto Show.

=== Non-automotive designs ===
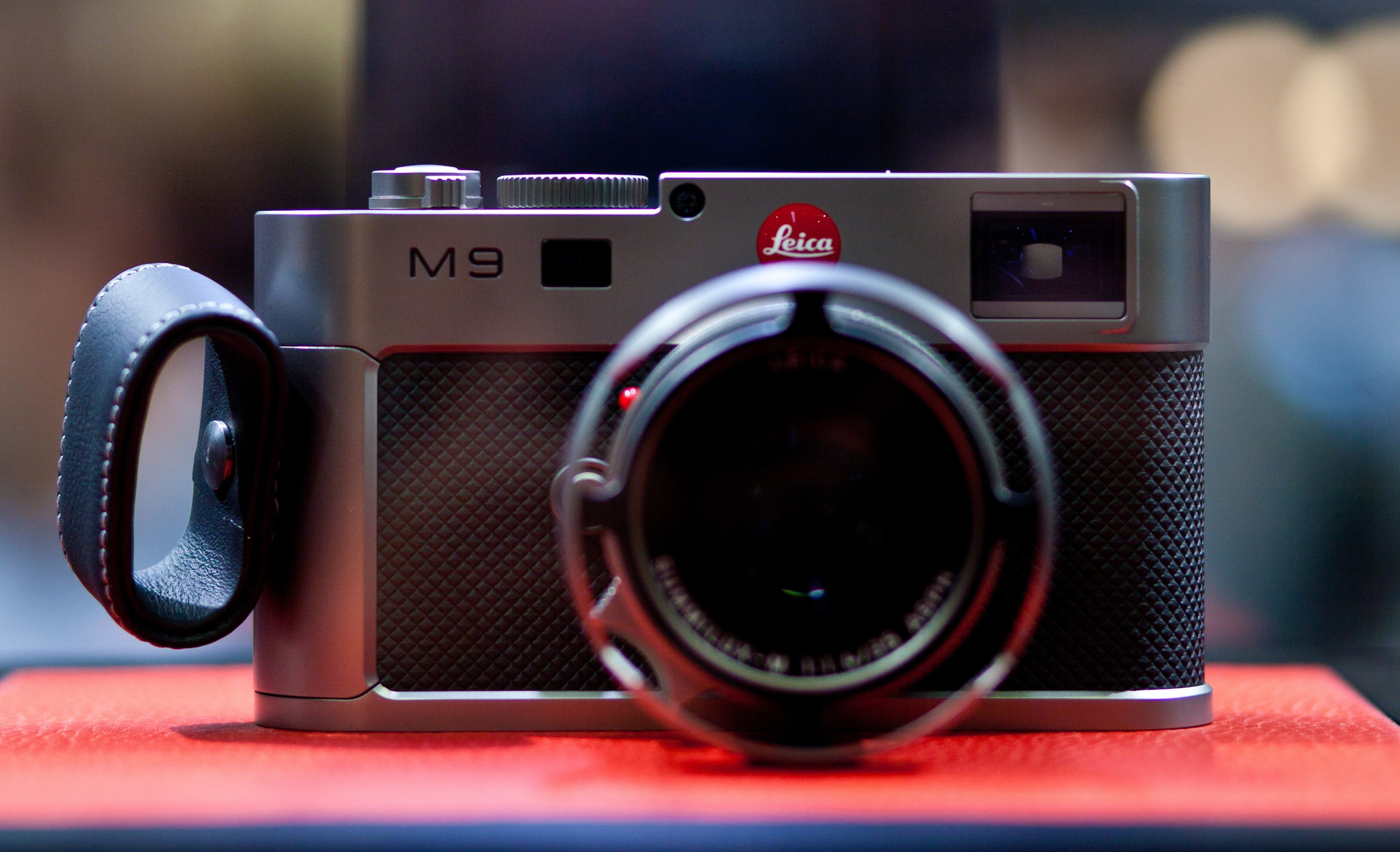
Leica M9 Titanium designed by De Silva

In 2016, De Silva and his wife Emmanuelle launched a line of stiletto shoes, stating to be inspired partially by his shoemaker grandfather. Previously he had also designed the Leica M9 Titanium camera and an armchair for Poltrona Frau.

== Designs ==
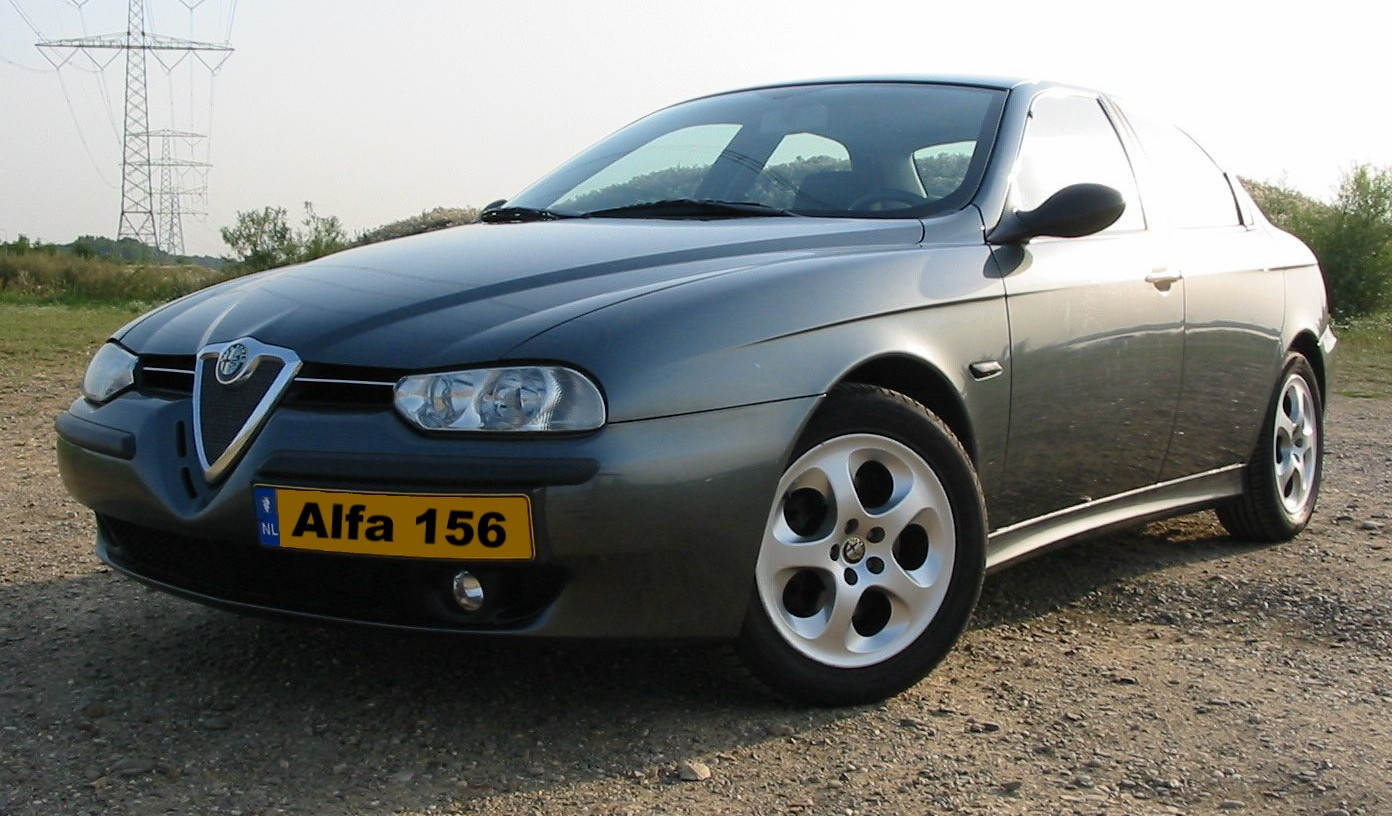
The Alfa Romeo 156

- Alfa Romeo
  - Alfa Romeo Proteo (1991)
  - Alfa Romeo 146 (1995)
  - Alfa Romeo 156 (1997)
  - Alfa Romeo 166 (1998)
  - Alfa Romeo 147 (2000)
- Bugatti
  - Bugatti Veyron Concept (1999)

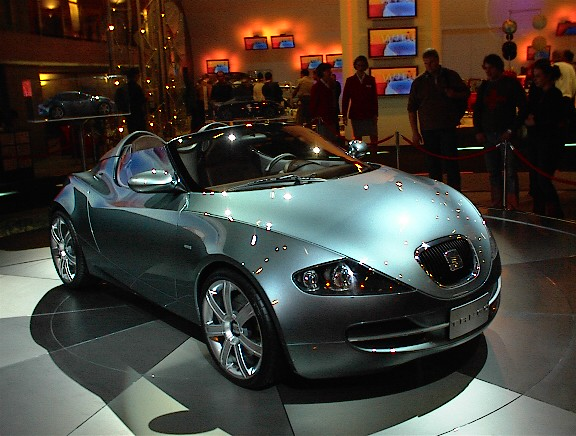
The SEAT Tango roadster

- SEAT
  - SEAT Salsa & Salsa Emoción (2000)
  - SEAT Tango roadster/spyder/coupé/Racer (2001)
  - SEAT Ibiza (2002)
  - SEAT Córdoba (2002)
  - SEAT Altea Prototipo (2003)
  - SEAT Altea (2004)
  - SEAT Toledo (2004)
  - SEAT León (2005)

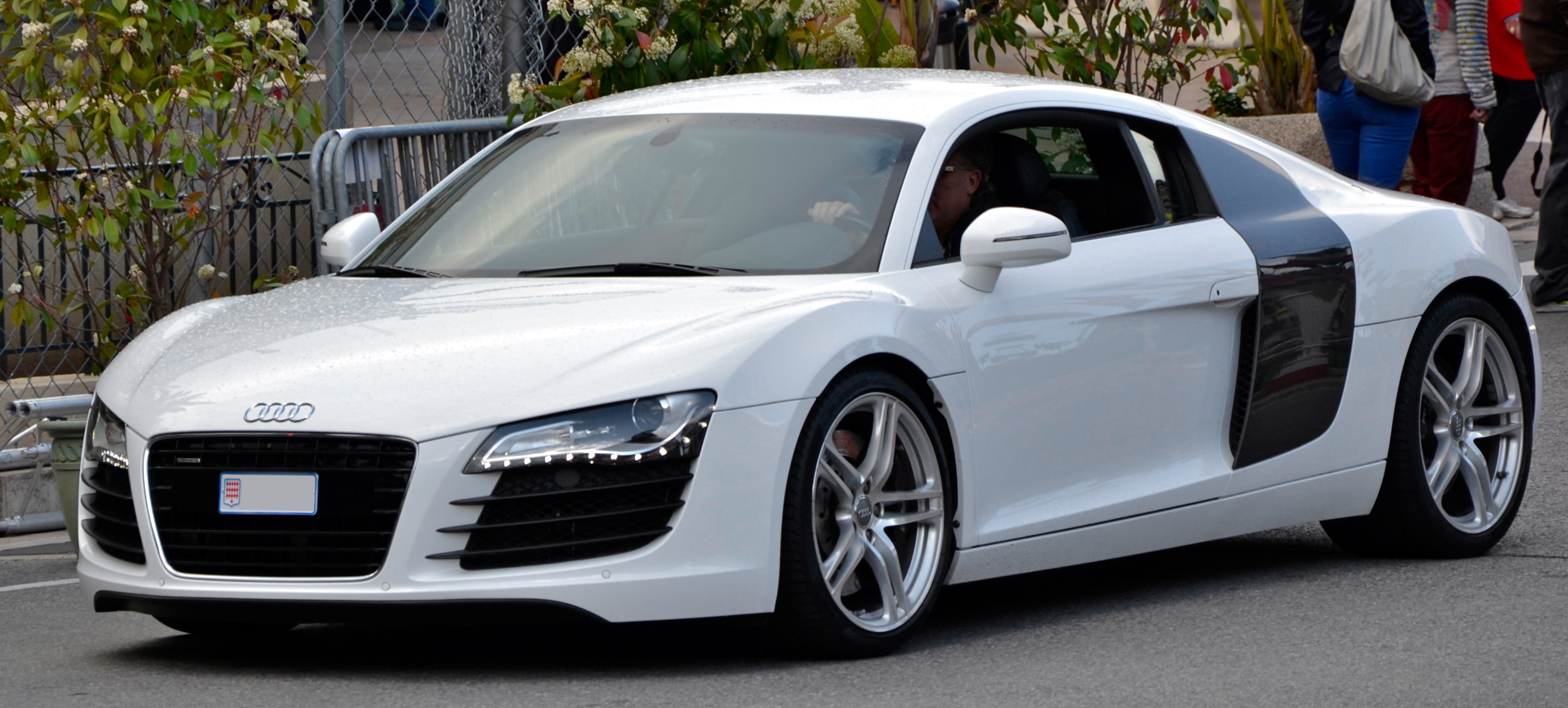
The Audi R8

- Audi
  - Audi A6 (2004)
  - Audi Q7 (2005)
  - Audi R8 (2006)
  - Audi TT (2006)
  - Audi A5 (2007)
  - Audi A3 (Typ 8P/8PA) (2003)
- Lamborghini
  - Lamborghini Miura concept (2006)
  - Lamborghini Egoista (2013)

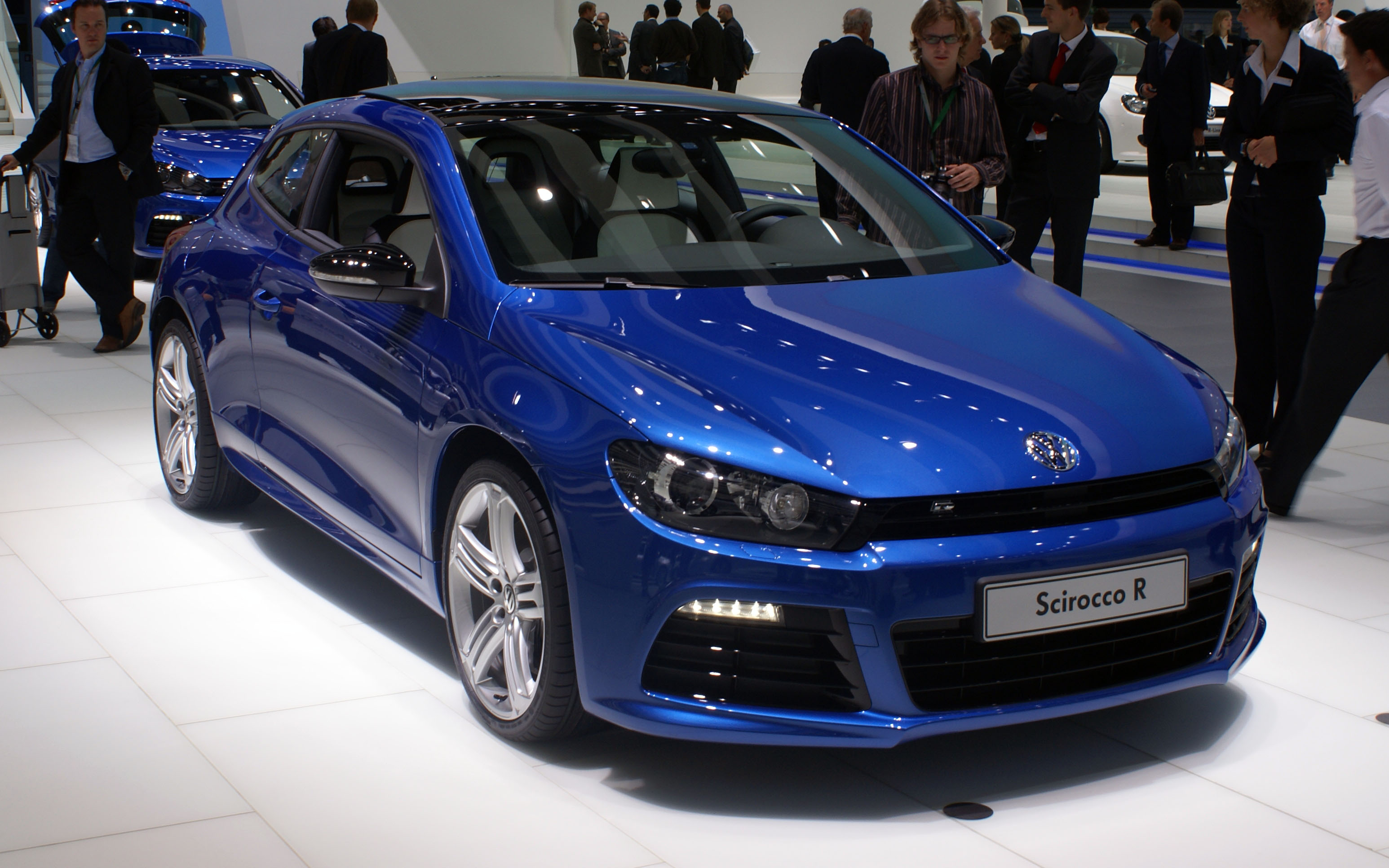
The VW Scirocco

- Volkswagen
  - Volkswagen CC (2008)
  - Volkswagen Golf (2008)
  - Volkswagen Scirocco (2008)
  - Volkswagen Polo (2009)
  - Volkswagen Amarok (2010)
  - Volkswagen Jetta (2010)
  - Volkswagen Passat (2010)
  - Volkswagen Sharan (2010)
  - Volkswagen Touareg (2010)
  - Volkswagen Beetle (2011)
  - Volkswagen up! (2011)
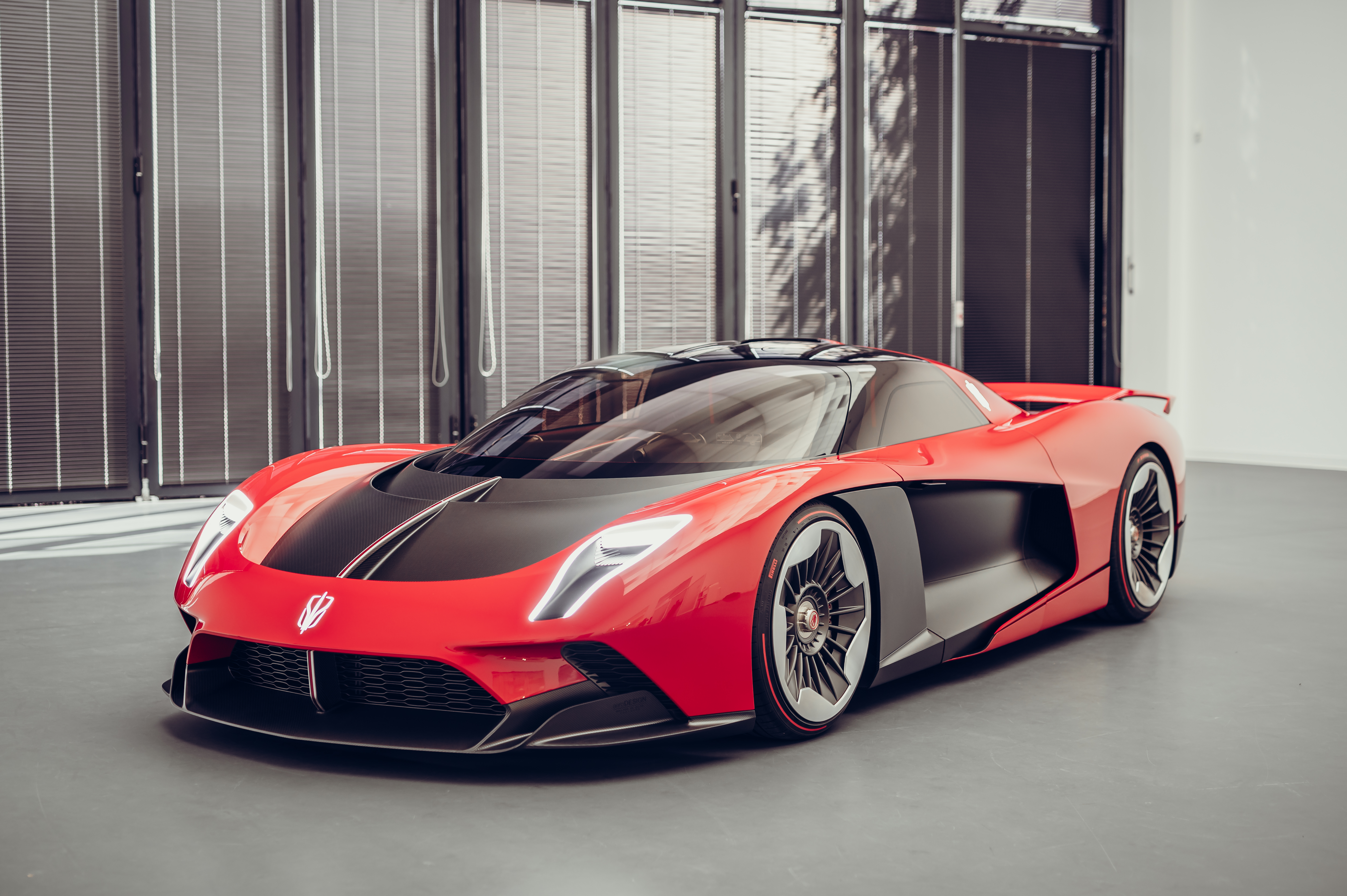
    Hongqi S9
  - Volkswagen Touran (2015)
- Leica Camera
  - Leica M9 Titanium (2010)
- Arcfox
  - ECF Concept (2019)
- SilkFAW Automotive
  - S9 (2021)

== Awards and recognitions ==
- Designpreis der Bundesrepublik Deutschland (2010)
- Premio Compasso d'oro alla Carriera (2011)
- EyesOn Design Lifetime Achievement Award (2011)
- Medaille für besondere Verdienste um Bayern in einem Vereinigten Europa (2013)
