= SEAT Salsa =

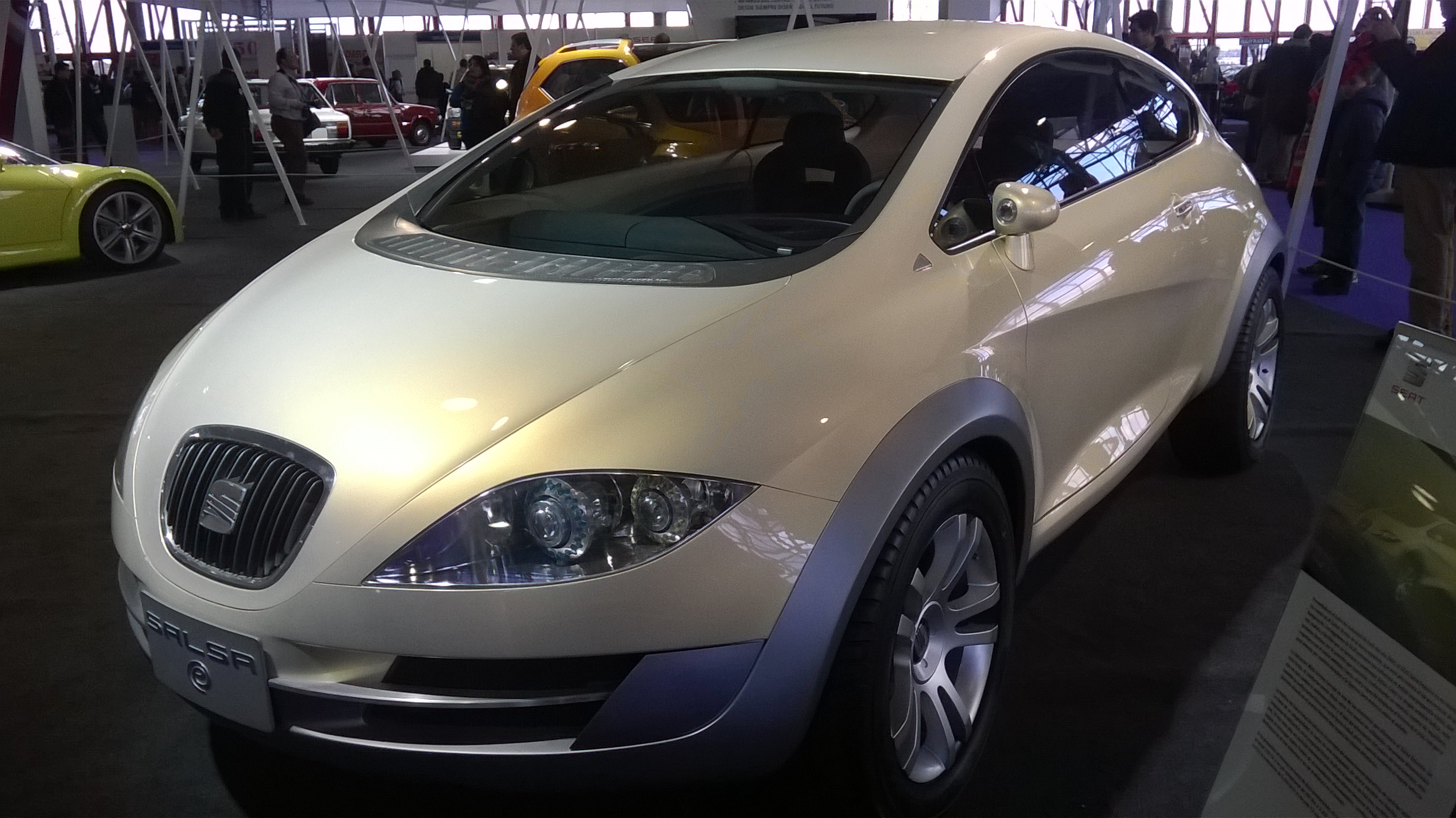

Overview
- Manufacturer: SEAT, SA
- Also called: SEAT Salsa Emoción
- Production: 2000
- Designer: Walter de Silva

Body and chassis
- Class: Multi Driving Concept car, sports car
- Body style: 3-door coupé
- Layout: front engine transverse
- Related: SEAT León Mk2, SEAT Altea

Powertrain
- Engine: 2.8 L (170 cu in) 24 valve V6 in 15.0°, DOHC
- Transmission: 5-speed Tiptronic

Dimensions
- Wheelbase: 2,591 mm (102.0 in)
- Length: 4,152 mm (163.5 in)
- Width: 1,777 mm (70.0 in)
- Height: 1,381 mm (54.4 in)
- Curb weight: 1,570 kg (3,460 lb)

The SEAT Salsa is a concept car presented at the 2000 Geneva Motor Show, as a foretaste of SEAT's new design line under Walter de'Silva. Featuring a three-door coupé body style, it is powered by a 250 PS (184 kW; 247 hp) 2.8L 24 valve V6 engine.

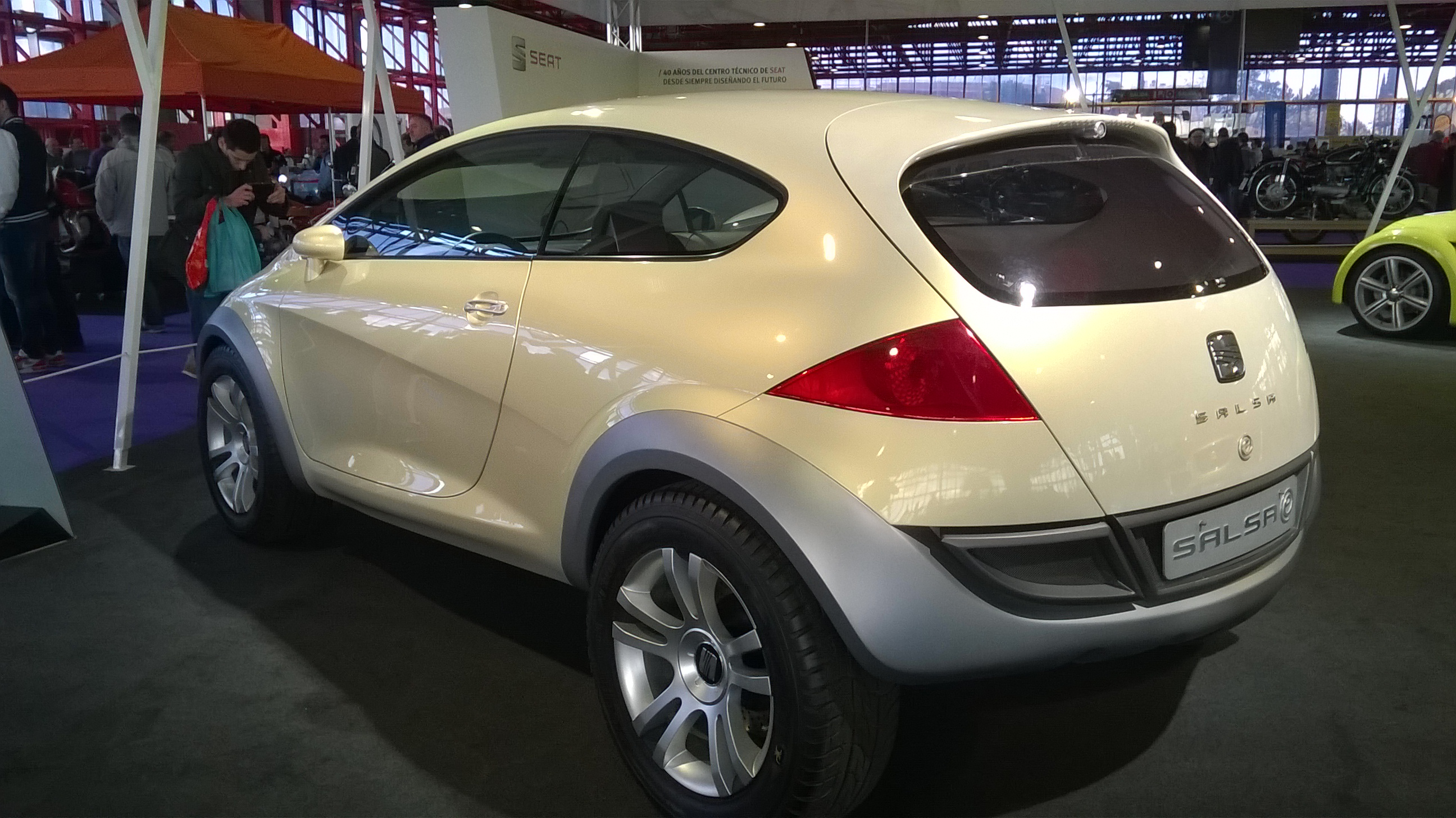
SEAT Salsa Emoción

The SEAT Salsa was described as a Multi Driving concept car, because its driver could select through a dashboard switch several driving modes (sport, comfort, city) thus modifying not only the engine and the gearbox parameters but also the driving position, the interior lighting or even the layout of the dashboard.

Six months after the presentation of the Salsa in Geneva, SEAT revealed the SEAT Salsa Emoción at the 2000 Autosalon Paris. The Salsa Emoción is the evolution of the initial Multi Driving concept car, adding new features in terms of an all road adaptability.

On the design process of the Salsa concept, the Alias StudioTools CAID software has been used.

== Engine ==
- Type: 2.8L 24 valve V6 in 15.0°, DOHC
- Displacement cu in (cc): 170.317 (2791)
- Power bhp (kW) at RPM: 247 (184.2)/6200
- Torque ft·lbf (Nm) at RPM: 219 (297)/3200

== Brakes and tires ==
- Brakes front/rear: vented disc/vented disc, ABS
- Driveline: Four wheel drive
- Tires: Michelin PAX 225-640 R 460 A Segment SPORT, 7.5J x 18 wheel

== Exterior dimensions and weight ==
- Length × Width × Height in: 163.5 × 70 × 54.4
- Weight lb (kg): 3461 ( 1570 )

== Performance ==
- Acceleration 0–100 km/h s: 7.5
- Top Speed mph (km/h): 152 (245)
