= SEAT Altea =

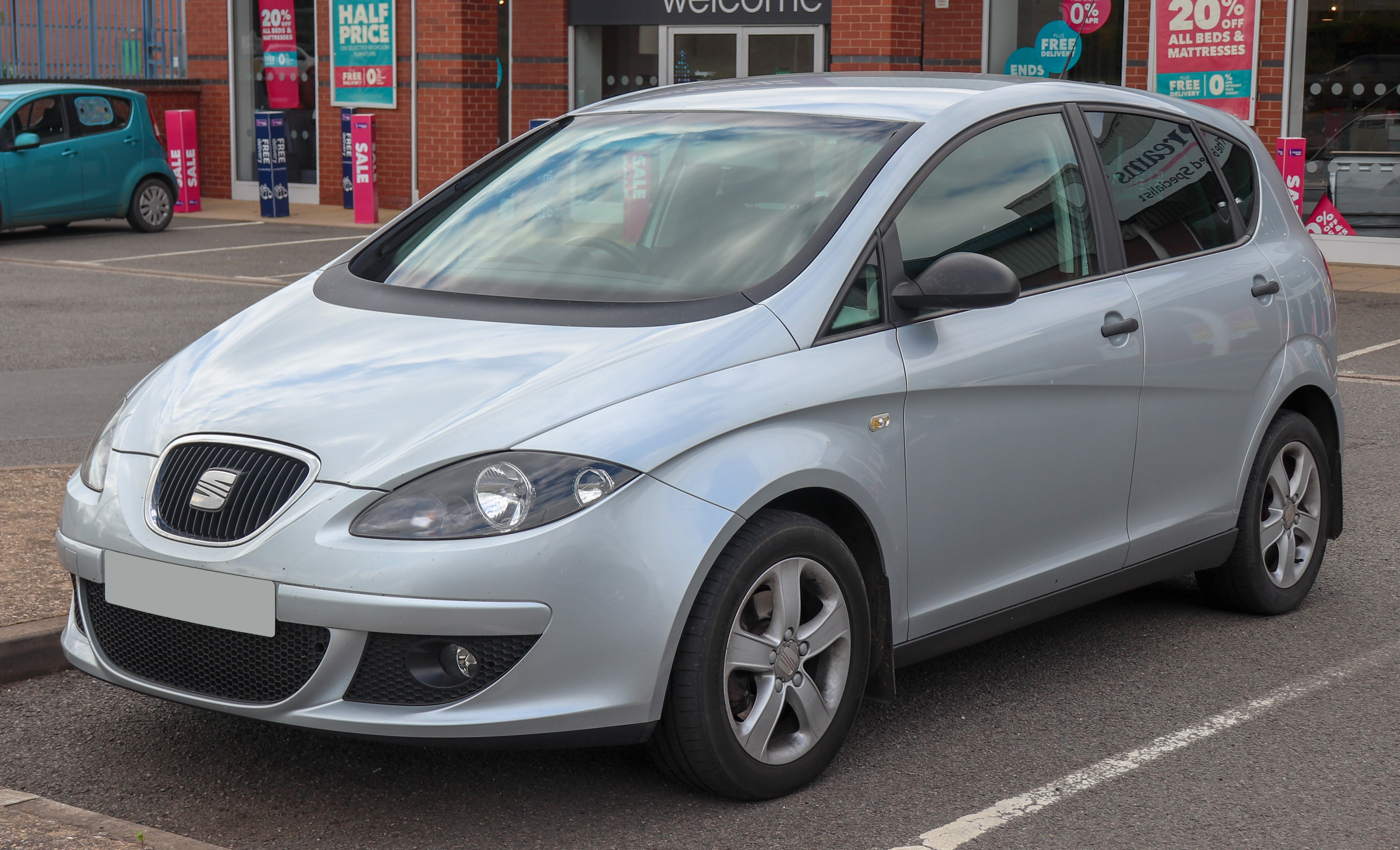

Overview
- Manufacturer: SEAT
- Production: 2004–2015
- Assembly: Spain: Martorell, Catalonia; Ukraine: Solomonovo (Eurocar)
- Designer: Walter de Silva

Body and chassis
- Class: Compact MPV (C)
- Body style: 5-door MPV
- Layout: Front-engine, front-wheel-drive
- Platform: Volkswagen Group A5 (PQ35)
- Related: Audi A3 Mk2; Audi TT Mk2; SEAT León Mk2; SEAT Toledo Mk3; Volkswagen Golf Mk5; Volkswagen Golf Mk6; Volkswagen Golf Plus; Volkswagen Touran; Škoda Octavia Mk2; SEAT Salsa Emoción concept

Powertrain
- Engine: Petrol engines: 1.2 L I4 TSI; 1.4 L I4; 1.4 L I4 TSI; 1.6 L I4; 1.8 L I4 TSI; 2.0 L I4 FSI; 2.0 L I4 TSI; GAS/LPG engines: 1.6 L LPG; Diesel engines: 1.6 L I4 TDI; 1.9 L I4 TDI; 2.0 L I4 TDI; 2.0 L I4 TDI DPF
- Transmission: 5-speed manual 6-speed manual 6-speed tiptronic automatic 6-speed Direct-Shift Gearbox; 7-speed Direct-Shift Gearbox

Dimensions
- Wheelbase: 2,580 mm (101.6 in)
- Length: 4,280 mm (168.5 in)
- Width: 1,770 mm (69.7 in)
- Height: 1,560 mm (61.4 in)

Chronology
- Successor: SEAT Ateca

The SEAT Altea is an automobile produced by the Spanish automaker SEAT from 2004 to 2015 being previewed by the Salsa Emoción concept. As a compact multi-purpose vehicle (MPV), the car was designed by the Italian Walter de Silva, and was launched in March 2004, as the first example of SEAT's new corporate look. The third generation Toledo was identical, except for the addition of a larger boot similar to the one in the Renault Vel Satis. It was launched at the 2004 Geneva Motor Show.

Another extended version, the Altea XL, is also available (having been first presented at the 2006 Paris Motor Show). In 2007, the Altea Freetrack, with four-wheel drive and higher suspension, was released.

On 21 August 2015, SEAT announced that the Altea and Altea XL had been discontinued. Although no direct replacement for the Altea was planned, SEAT is following the global shift from MPVs to SUVs, by launching its own SUV model based on the SEAT León. In February 2016, the Ateca was launched, which was the successor to the Altea according to CEO Luca de Meo: "For us, the Ateca is the replacement of the Altea."

== Overview ==
The Altea was released a few years after many of its competitors arriving on the scene, but it was expected to sell well. However, it exceeded expectations, and 31,223 Alteas were sold within the first year. It is a family oriented five seater, which attempts to portray a more sporty image than most of its rivals. The car is based on Volkswagen Group's A5 (PQ35) platform.

An unusual design feature is the 'vertical parked' windscreen wipers, which are designed to improve pedestrian safety. They disappear in to the window surround either side of the screen. The effect is a completely cleanly swept windscreen, but does mean the 'A pillars' are rather wide and cause a blind spot.

There were six trim levels: Essence, Reference, Reference Sport, Stylance, Sport (no longer available in the United Kingdom) and FR. Internal combustion engines are available, with the range topping 2.0 FR Turbocharged Direct Injection (TDI) delivering 125 kilowatts (170 PS; 168 bhp), available since April 2006.

There are five gearboxes available (depending on market and engine); five or six speed manual, five speed tiptronic automatic, and six or seven speed Direct-Shift Gearbox. It is named after the Spanish city of Altea.

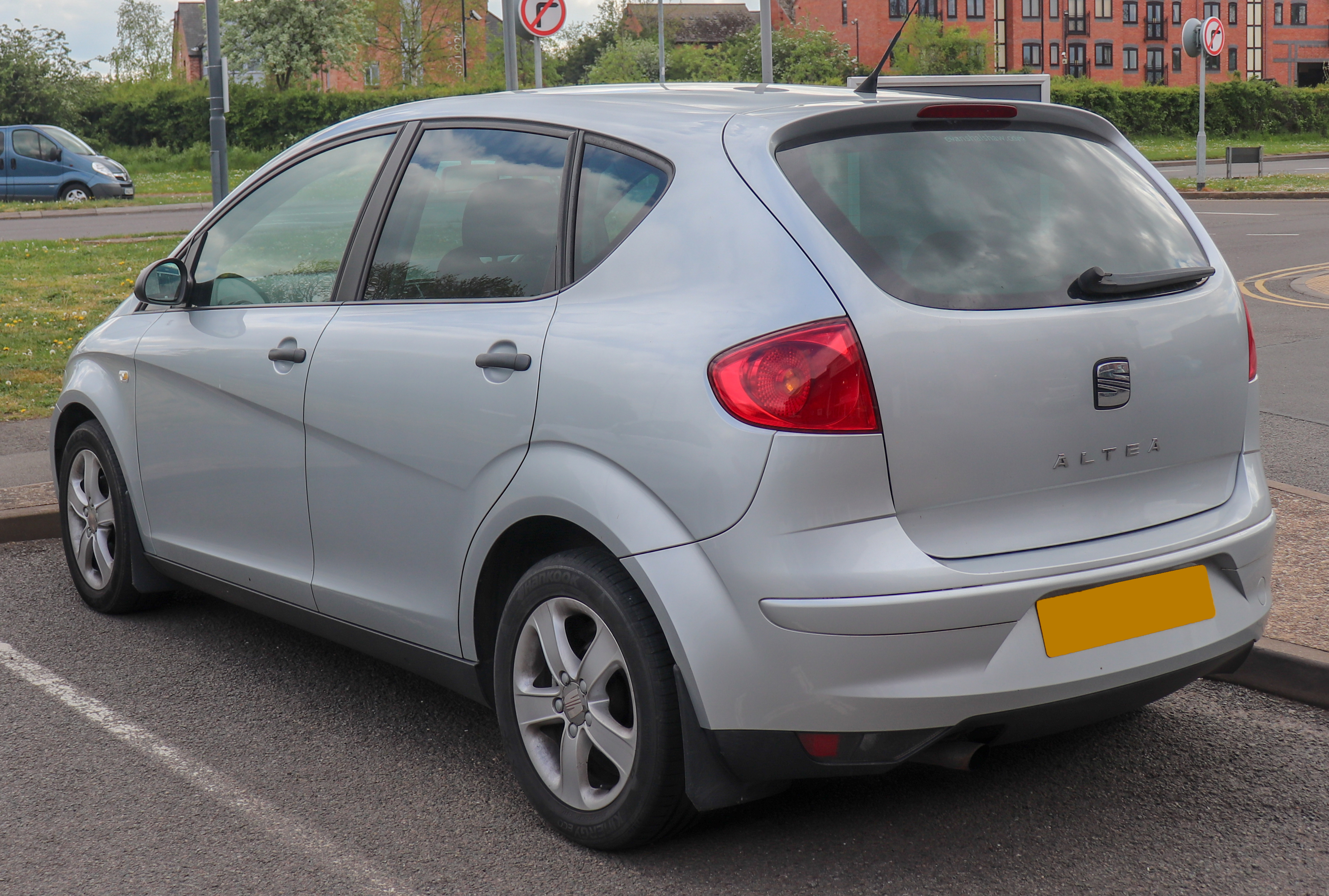
2007 SEAT Altea (pre-facelift)

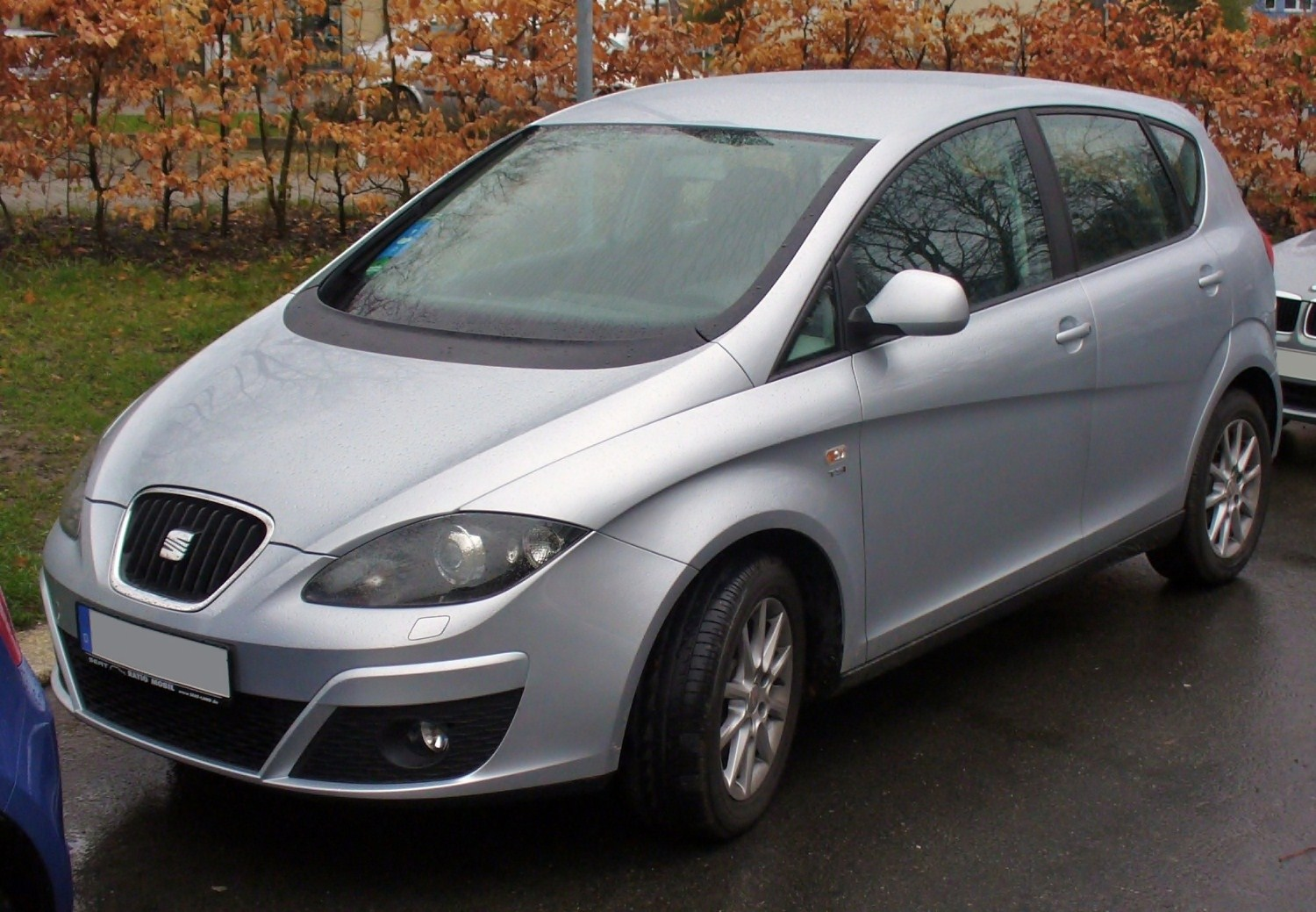
2009–2015 Altea (facelift)

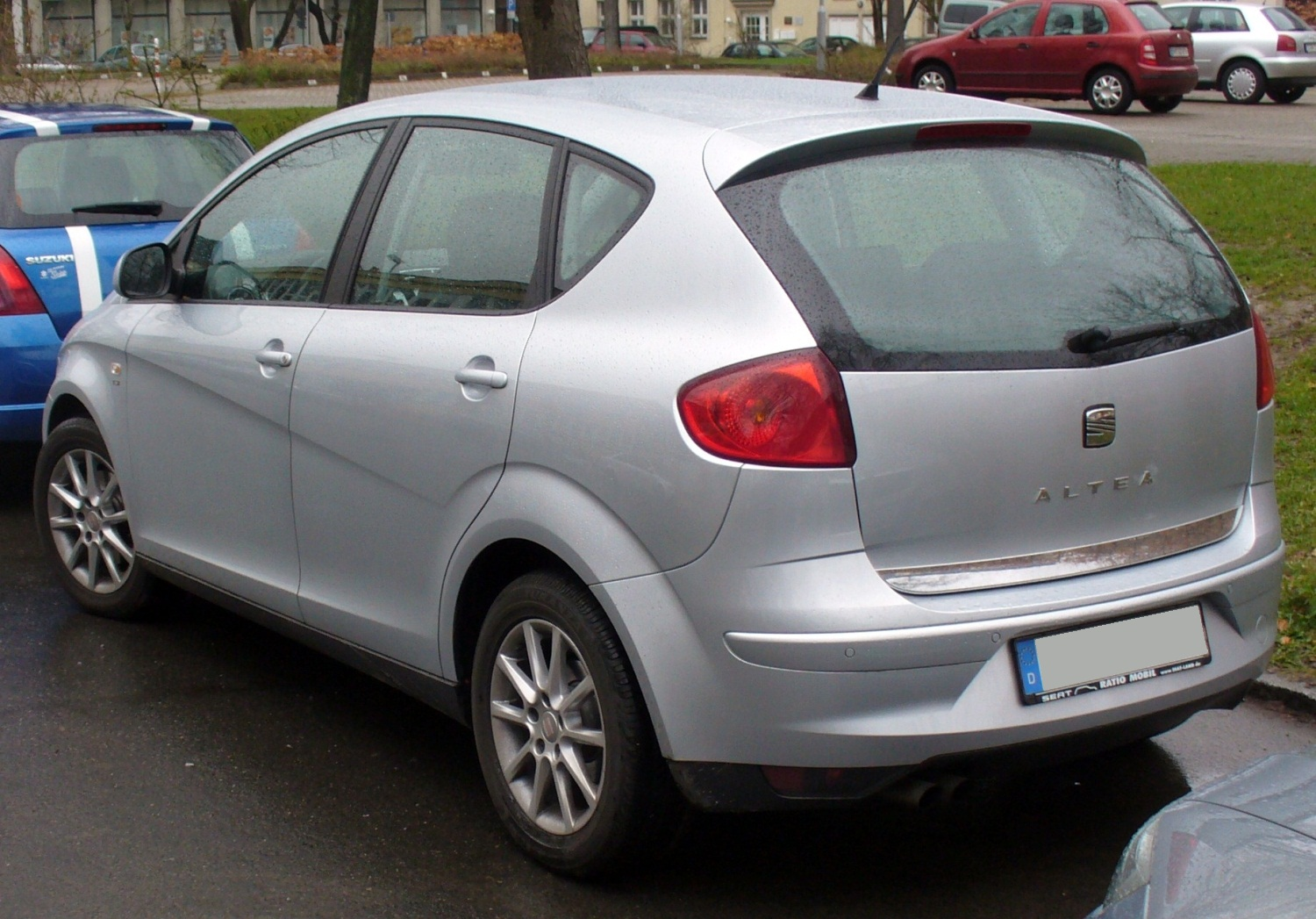
2009–2015 Altea (facelift)

== Safety ==
The SEAT Altea was tested in 2004, for its safety performance under the assessment scheme Euro NCAP, and it achieved an overall rating of five stars:

- Adult occupant
- Child occupant
- Pedestrian

== Awards ==
- "Red Dot: Best of The Best" Design Award, from the Nordrhein-Westfalen (Germany) Design Centre
- 'The World's Most Beautiful Automobile 2004', in Milan
- 'Autonis' Design Award, by the Auto-Strassenverkehr and MOT magazines
- 'Best Concept Car in 2003', by the Designers (Europe) organisation (for the SEAT Altea Prototipo)
- 'Towncar of the Year' Award, by the Caravan Club, in collaboration with the English magazine What Car?
- 'Auto Trophy' 2004 and 2005, by the German car magazine Autozeitung
- “XII Edición de los Premios del Motor” award of 2005, by the Spanish magazine Telva
- 'Coche de Flotas del Año' award of 2005, by the Spanish magazine Flotas
- 'Ampe' award in 2005 in the category Internet

== Powertrain ==
The following powertrain specifications are available:

all available internal combustion engines are inline four cylinder designs
model	displacement, valvetrain, fuel system	max power at rpm	max torque at rpm	engine ID code(s)
petrol engines all fuel injected
1.2 TSI	1197 cc, 8v SOHC; Turbocharged Fuel Stratified Injection	77 kW (105 PS; 103 bhp) at 5,000 rpm	175 N⋅m (129 lbf⋅ft) at 1,550–5100 rpm	CBZ
1.4	1390 cc, 16v DOHC multi-point fuel injection	63 kW (86 PS; 84 bhp) at 5,000 rpm	132 N⋅m (97 lbf⋅ft) at 1,500 rpm	BXW/CGG
1.4 TSI	1390 cc, 16v DOHC; Turbocharged Fuel Stratified Injection	92 kW (125 PS; 123 bhp) at 5,600 rpm	200 N⋅m (148 lbf⋅ft) at 1,750–4,000 rpm	CACX/CAX
1.6	1595 cc, 8v SOHC multi-point fuel injection	75 kW (102 PS; 101 bhp) at 5,600 rpm	148 N⋅m (109 lbf⋅ft) at 3,800 rpm	BGU/BSE/BSF/ CCS/CMX
1.8 TSI	1798 cc, 16v DOHC; Turbocharged Fuel Stratified Injection	118 kW (160 PS; 158 bhp) at 5,000−6,200 rpm	250 N⋅m (184 lbf⋅ft) at 1,500−4,500 rpm	BYT/BZB/ CDAA
2.0 FSI	1984 cc, 16v DOHC; Fuel Stratified Injection	110 kW (150 PS; 148 bhp) at 6,000 rpm	200 N⋅m (148 lbf⋅ft) at 3,500 rpm	BLR/BLY/ BVY/BVZ
2.0 TSI FR	1984 cc, 16v DOHC; Turbocharged Fuel Stratified Injection	147 kW (200 PS; 197 bhp) at 5,100–6,000 rpm	280 N⋅m (207 lbf⋅ft) at 1,800–5,000 rpm	BWA
2.0 TSI	1984 cc, 16v DOHC; Turbocharged Fuel Stratified Injection	155 kW (211 PS; 208 bhp) at 5,300−6,200 rpm	280 N⋅m (207 lbf⋅ft) at 1,700−5,200 rpm	CCZ
Liquefied Petroleum Gas engines (GAS/LPG)
1.6 LPG	1595 cc	75 kW (102 PS; 101 bhp) at 5,600 rpm	148 N⋅m (109 lbf⋅ft) at 3,800 rpm	CHG
diesel engines all Turbocharged Direct Injection (TDI)
1.6 TDI	1598 cc, 16v DOHC common rail	77 kW (105 PS; 103 bhp) at 4,400 rpm	250 N⋅m (184 lbf⋅ft) at 1,500−2,500 rpm	CAY
1.9 TDI	1896 cc, 8v SOHC "Pumpe Düse" (PD) unit injection	66 kW (90 PS; 89 bhp) at 4,000 rpm	210 N⋅m (155 lbf⋅ft) at 1,800−2,500 rpm	BXF
1.9 TDI	1896 cc, 8v SOHC "Pumpe Düse" (PD) unit injection	77 kW (105 PS; 103 bhp) at 4,000 rpm	250 N⋅m (184 lbf⋅ft) at 1,900 rpm	BJB/BKC/ BXE/BLS
2.0 TDI	1968 cc, 16v DOHC "Pumpe Düse" (PD) unit injection	100 kW (136 PS; 134 bhp) at 4,000 rpm	320 N⋅m (236 lbf⋅ft) at 1,750–2,500 rpm	AZV
2.0 TDI	1968 cc, 16v DOHC "Pumpe Düse" (PD) unit injection	103 kW (140 PS; 138 bhp) at 4,000 rpm	320 N⋅m (236 lbf⋅ft) at 1,750−2,500 rpm	BKD
2.0 TDI DPF	1968 cc, 8v SOHC "Pumpe Düse" (PD) unit injection, diesel particulate filter	103 kW (140 PS; 138 bhp) at 4,000 rpm	320 N⋅m (236 lbf⋅ft) at 1,750−2,500 rpm	BMM
2.0 TDI DPF FR	1968 cc, 16v DOHC "Pumpe Düse" (PD) unit injection, diesel particulate filter	125 kW (170 PS; 168 bhp) at 4,200 rpm	350 N⋅m (258 lbf⋅ft) at 1,750–2,500 rpm	BMN
2.0 TDI	1968 cc, 16v DOHC common rail	125 kW (170 PS; 168 bhp) at 4,200 rpm	350 N⋅m (258 lbf⋅ft) at 1,750−2,500 rpm	CEG

A flexible-fuel vehicle model was also on offer, under the label "MultiFuel", featuring the 1.6 MPI E85 102 bhp engine.

== Seat Altea XL/Freetrack ==
SEAT Altea XL Seat Altea Freetrack
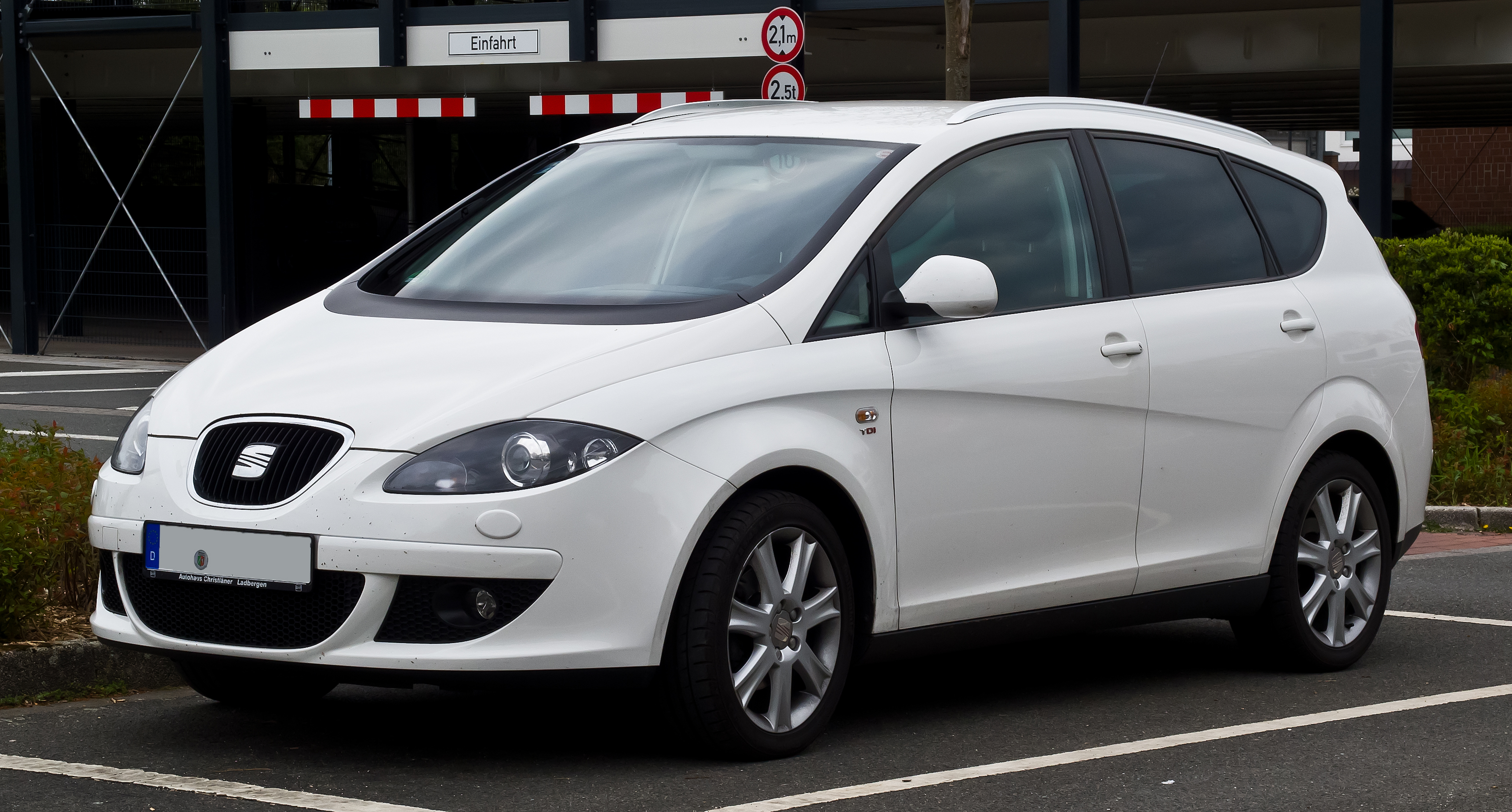
- 2006–2009

Overview
- Manufacturer: SEAT
- Also called: SEAT Altea 4 Seat Altea XL Stationwagon (The Netherlands)
- Production: 2006−2015 (XL); 2007−2015 (Freetrack)
- Assembly: Martorell, Spain

Body and chassis
- Class: Compact MPV (M)
- Body style: 5-door multi-purpose vehicle
- Layout: Front-engine, front-wheel-drive/four-wheel-drive
- Platform: Volkswagen Group A5 (PQ35)
- Related: Audi A3 Mk2; Audi TT Mk2; SEAT León Mk2; SEAT Toledo Mk3; Škoda Octavia Mk2; Volkswagen Golf Mk5; Volkswagen Golf Mk6; Volkswagen Golf Plus; Volkswagen Touran; Volkswagen Tiguan

Powertrain
- Engine: petrol engines: 1.4 L I4; 1.4 L I4 TSI; 1.6 L I4; 1.8 L I4 TSI; 2.0 L I4 TSI diesel engines: 1.9 L I4 TDI; 2.0 L I4 TDI DPF; 2.0 L I4 TDI; 2.0 L I4 TDI DPF; 2.0 L I4 TDI CR DPF
- Transmission: 5-speed manual 6-speed manual 6-speed Direct-Shift Gearbox; 7-speed Direct-Shift Gearbox

Dimensions
- Wheelbase: 2,578 mm (101.5 in) — XL; 2,576 mm (101.4 in) — Freetrack
- Length: 4,467 mm (175.9 in) — XL; 4,493 mm (176.9 in) — Freetrack
- Width: 1,768 mm (69.6 in) — XL; 1,788 mm (70.4 in) — Freetrack
- Height: 1,576 mm (62.0 in) — XL; 1,622 mm (63.9 in) — Freetrack
- Kerb weight: 1,330 kg (2,932 lb) - 1,586 kg (3,497 lb)

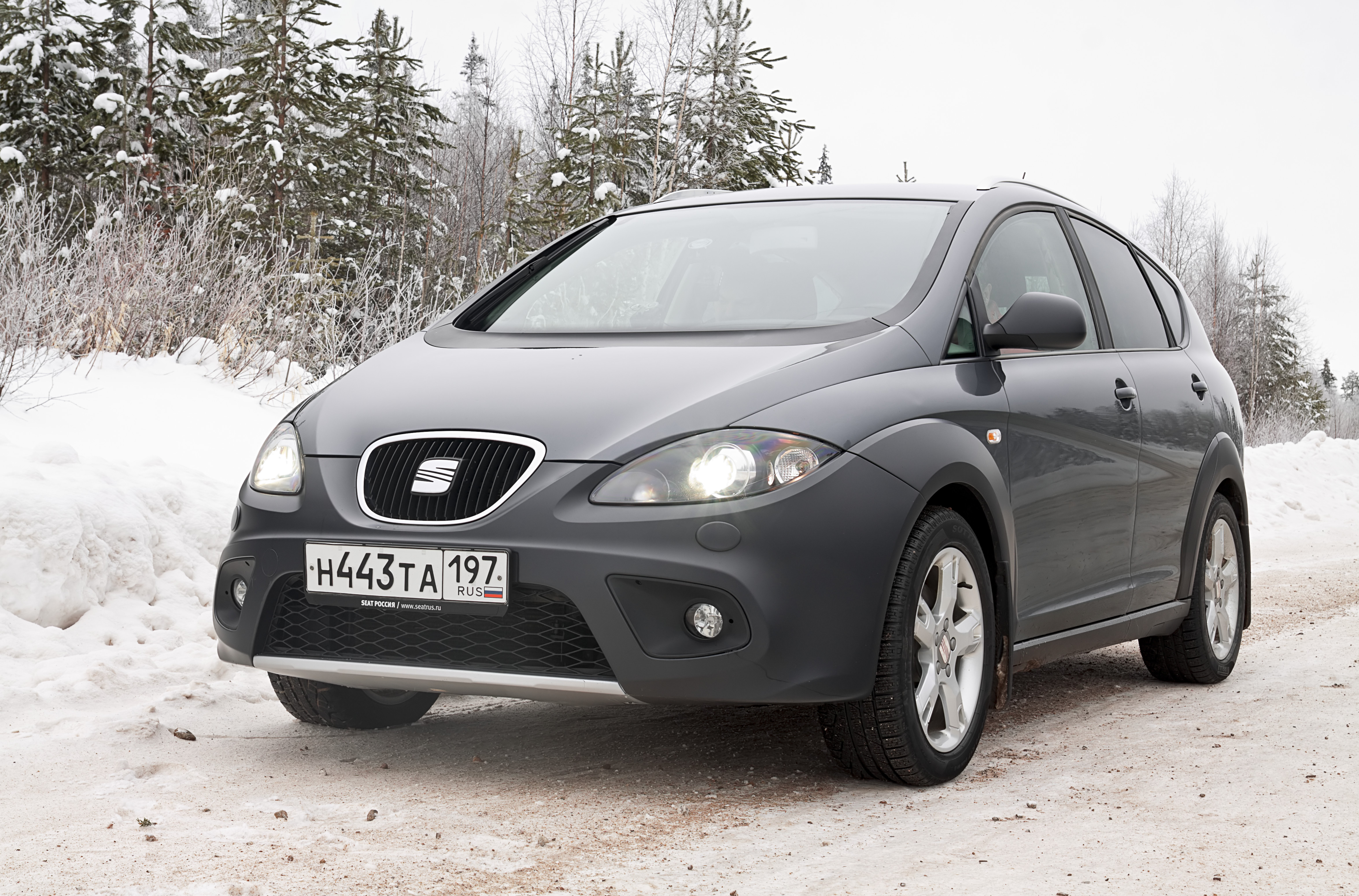
SEAT Altea Freetrack

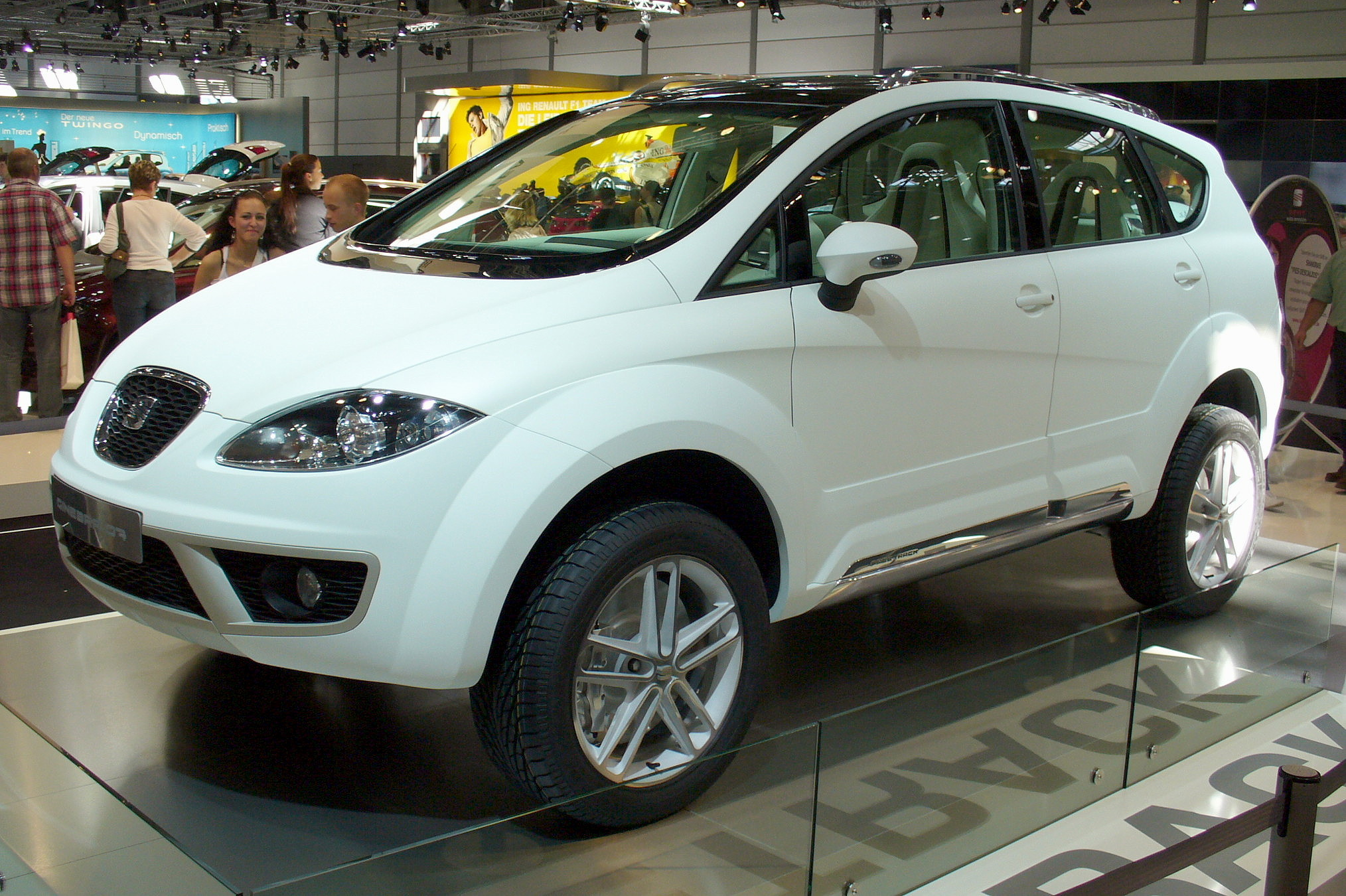
SEAT Altea Freetrack (prototype)

The SEAT Altea XL is an 18.7 centimetres (7.4 in) longer variant of the normal SEAT Altea, a five door five seat compact multi purpose vehicle (MPV), with increased luggage capacity compared to the standard Altea. It was launched at the Paris Motor Show in September 2006. Sales commenced in November 2006.

The SEAT Altea Freetrack is dimensionally similar to the Altea XL, but is designed as compact sport-utility vehicle (SUV). It features raised suspension for increased ground clearance and larger plastic bumpers, and plastic wheel arch and sill extensions, which all increase its exterior dimensions.

All versions of the Freetrack, except the 2.0 Turbocharged Direct Injection (TDI) 2WD, are equipped with a Haldex Traction based on demand four-wheel drive (4WD). The 4WD versions are also called Seat Altea 4. In Mexico and Russia, the SEAT Altea Freetrack is marketed simply as the SEAT Freetrack.

Although the Freetrack is available with 4WD, it is not marketed by SEAT as an "SUV". However, the Freetrack could be seen as a competitor for small SUVs from other marques. The possible internal combustion engine choices are almost the same as for the normal Altea. When launched, it was available in a very uncommon intense yellow. This colour was also seen on models in several promotional brochures - however the colour scheme went out of production by August 2010.

=== Gallery ===
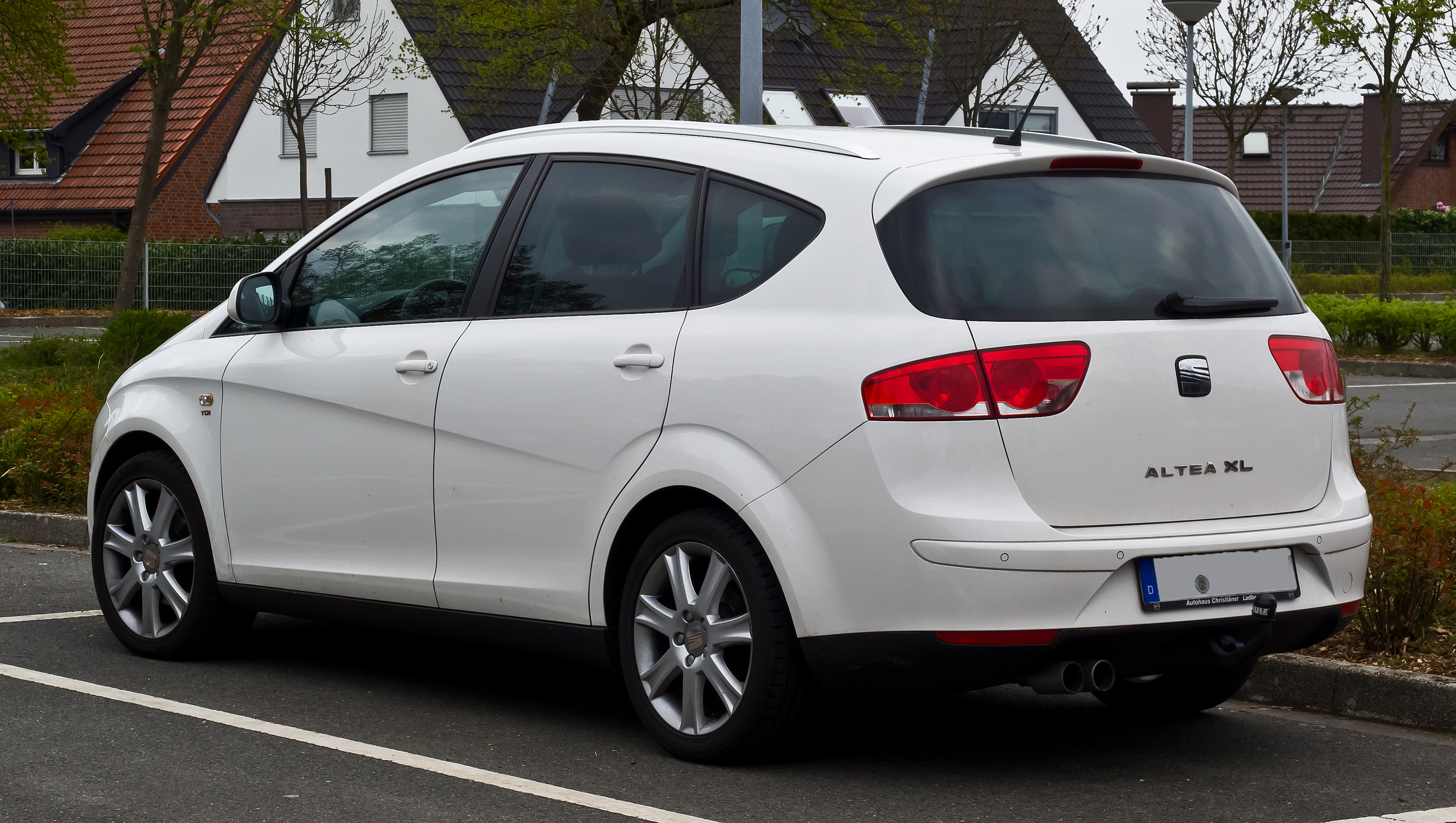
2006–2009

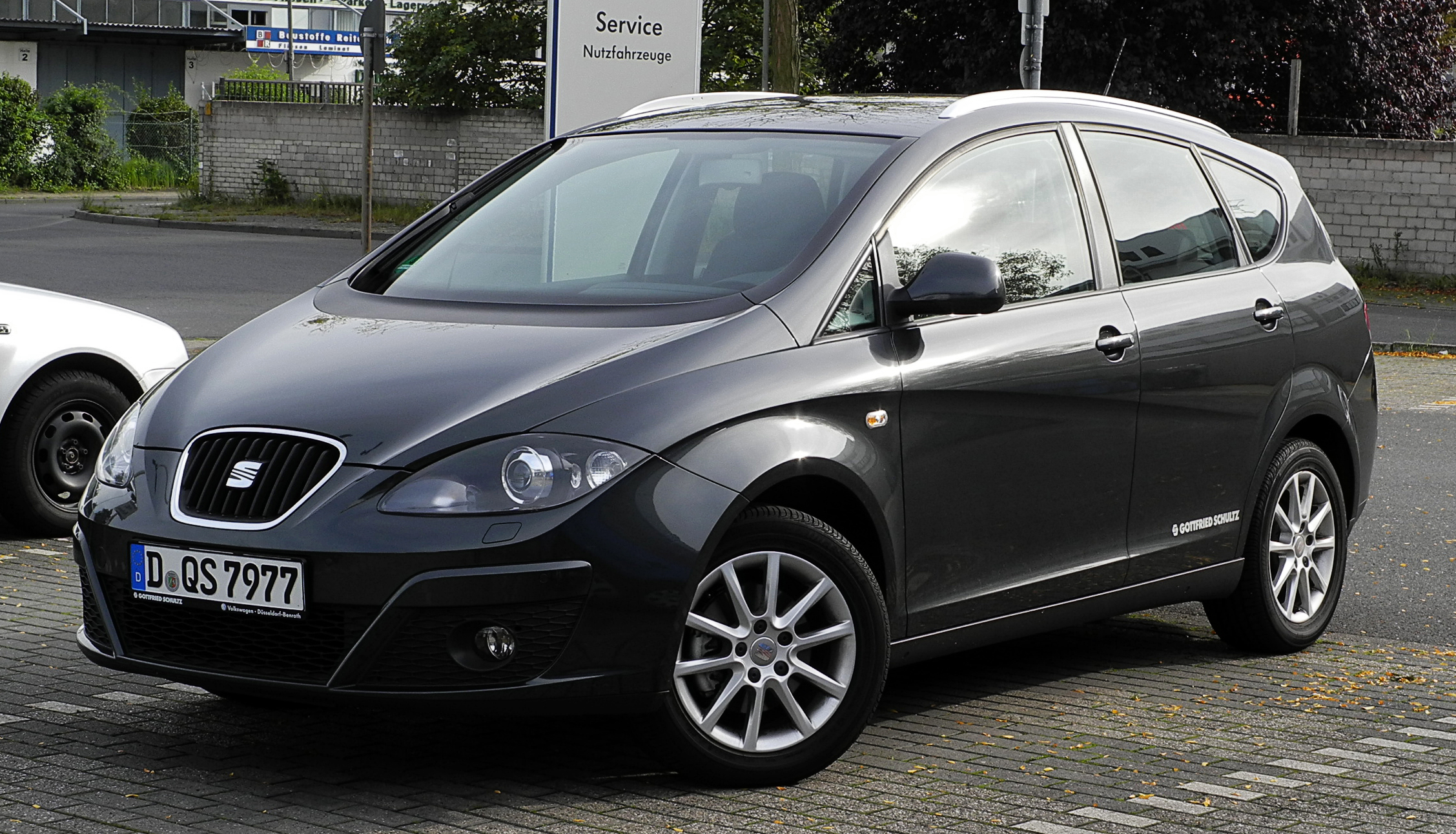
2009–2015

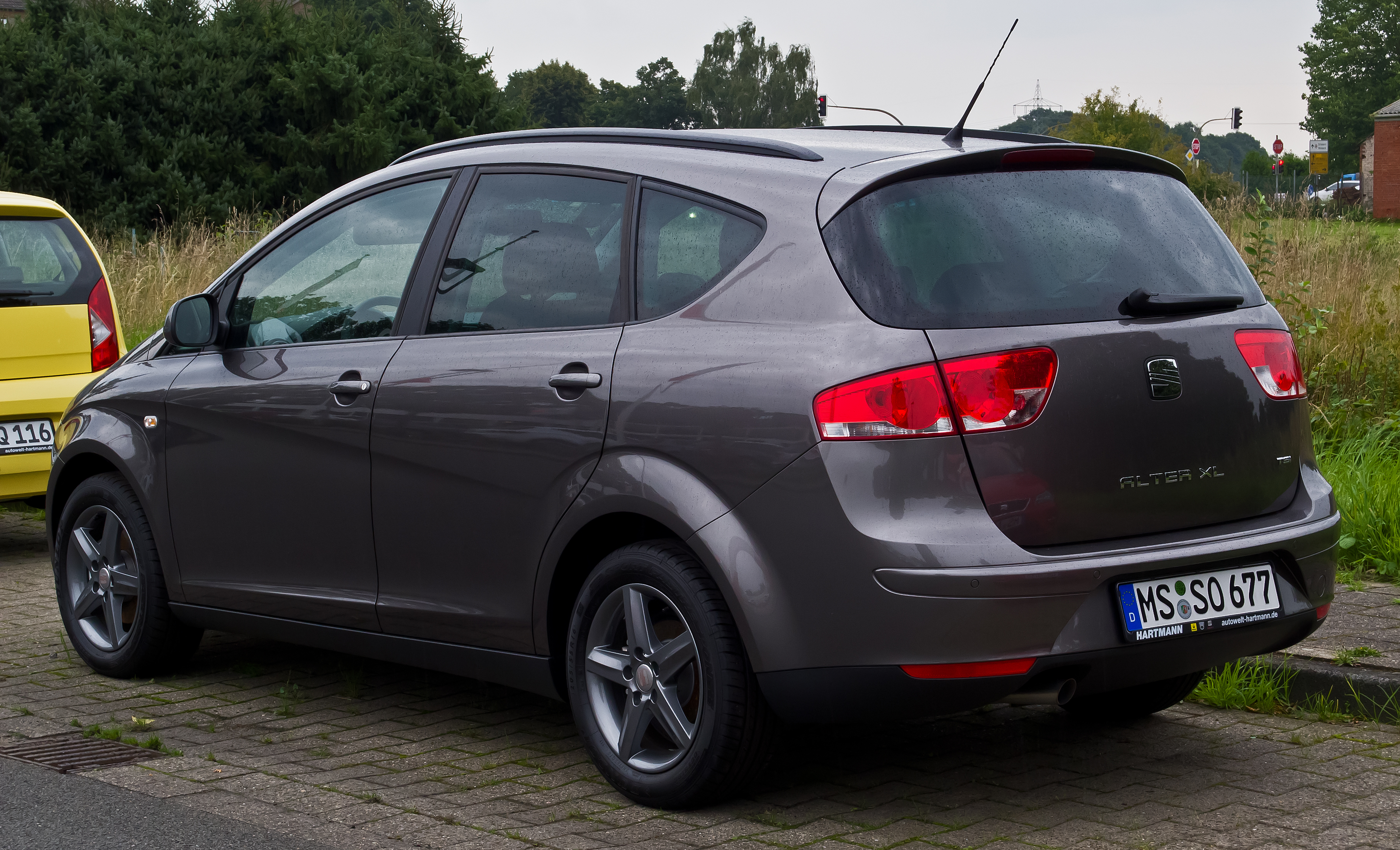
2009–2015

=== Awards ===
- Altea 2006 Award, by the Asociación de Telespectadores de la Comunidad de Andalucía

=== Powertrain ===
The following powertrain options are available, with certain configurations utilising Volkswagen Groups highly regarded Direct-Shift Gearbox (DSG):

all available internal combustion engines are inline four cylinder designs
model	displacement, valvetrain, fuel system	max power at rpm	max torque at rpm	transmission(s)	XL	Freetrack
petrol engines all fuel injected
1.4	1390 cc, 16v DOHC multi-point fuel injection	63 kW (86 PS; 84 bhp) at 5,000	132 N⋅m (97 lbf⋅ft) at 1,500	5 speed manual		
1.4 TSI	1390 cc, 16v DOHC; Turbocharged Fuel Stratified Injection	92 kW (125 PS; 123 bhp) at 5,000	200 N⋅m (148 lbf⋅ft) at 1,500−4,000	6 speed manual		
1.6	1595 cc, 8v SOHC multi-point fuel injection	75 kW (102 PS; 101 bhp) at 5,600	148 N⋅m (109 lbf⋅ft) at 3,800	5 speed manual		
1.8 TSI	1798 cc, 16v DOHC; Turbocharged Fuel Stratified Injection	118 kW (160 PS; 158 bhp) at 5,000−6,200	250 N⋅m (184 lbf⋅ft) at 1,500−4,500	6 speed manual 7 speed DSG		
2.0 TSI	1984 cc, 16v DOHC; Turbocharged Fuel Stratified Injection	155 kW (211 PS; 208 bhp) at 5,300−6,200	280 N⋅m (207 lbf⋅ft) at 1,700−5,200	6 speed DSG; 6 speed DSG		2WD & 4WD
diesel engines all Turbocharged Direct Injection (TDI)
1.9 TDI (from Sept '09)	1896 cc, 8v SOHC "Pumpe Düse" (PD) unit injection	66 kW (90 PS; 89 bhp) at 4,000	210 N⋅m (155 lbf⋅ft) at 1,800	5 speed manual		
1.9 TDI	1896 cc, 8v SOHC "Pumpe Düse" (PD) unit injection	77 kW (105 PS; 103 bhp) at 4,000	250 N⋅m (184 lbf⋅ft) at 1,900	5 speed manual		
1.9 TDI DPF	1896 cc, 8v SOHC "Pumpe Düse" (PD) unit injection, diesel particulate filter	77 kW (105 PS; 103 bhp) at 4,000	250 N⋅m (184 lbf⋅ft) at 1,900	5 speed manual 6 speed manual 4WD; 6 speed DSG		
2.0 TDI	1968 cc, 16v DOHC "Pumpe Düse" (PD) unit injection	103 kW (140 PS; 138 bhp) at 4,000	320 N⋅m (236 lbf⋅ft) at 1,750−2,500	6 speed manual 6 speed DSG		
2.0 TDI DPF	1968 cc, 8v SOHC "Pumpe Düse" (PD) unit injection, diesel particulate filter	103 kW (140 PS; 138 bhp) at 4,000	320 N⋅m (236 lbf⋅ft) at 1,750−2,500	6 speed manual 6 speed DSG		2WD & 4WD
2.0 TDI CR DPF	1968 cc, 16v DOHC common rail, diesel particulate filter	125 kW (170 PS; 168 bhp) at 4,200	350 N⋅m (258 lbf⋅ft) at 1,750−2,500	6 speed manual		4WD

A flexible-fuel vehicle model was also on offer, under the label "MultiFuel", featuring the 1.6 MPI E85 102 bhp (76 kW; 103 PS) engine.

== Sales ==
SEAT sold a total of 439 Altea models in the United Kingdom during 2014, and 445 Altea XLs.

Half a million SEAT Alteas have been produced overall.
