= List of FAW vehicles =

This is a list of current and former automobiles produced by Chinese state-owned automaker China FAW Group (abbreviated as FAW), under its brands of Hongqi, and Bestune. The brands formerly used by the company include FAW Tianjin, FAW Jilin, and Oley.

== Current vehicles ==
=== Hongqi ===
Note: Cars that have a blank on the Series part are part of the Energy-Saving series.

| Image | Name(s) | Chinese name | Series | Introduction (cal. year) | Generation | Vehicle description |
Sedan
| | Guoli/L5 | 红旗国礼 | Golden Sunflower | 2014 | Second | Full-size sedan |
| | Guoya/L1 | 红旗国雅 | Golden Sunflower | 2024 | First | Full-size sedan |
| | H9 | 红旗H9 | Hongqi | 2020 | Second | Full-size sedan, ICE/PHEV |
| | H7 | 红旗H7 | Hongqi | 2013 | Second | Full-size sedan, PHEV |
| | H6 | 红旗H6 | Hongqi | 2023 | First | Mid-size sedan |
| | H5 | 红旗H5 | Hongqi | 2018 | Second | Mid-size sedan, ICE/HEV/PHEV |
| | EH7 | 红旗EH7 | Tiangong | 2024 | First | Mid-size sedan, BEV |
| | Tiangong 05/EH5 | 红旗天工05 | Tiangong | 2025 | First | Mid-size sedan, BEV |
| | E-QM5 | 红旗E-QM5 | Tiangong | 2021 | First | Compact sedan, BEV |
SUV
| | Guoyao/LS7 | 红旗国耀 | Golden Sunflower | 2022 | First | Full-size SUV |
| | G919 | 红旗G919 | Hongqi | 2026 | First | Full-size off-road SUV, EREV |
| | HS7 | 红旗HS7 | Hongqi | 2019 | Second | Mid-size SUV, PHEV |
| | HS6 | 红旗HS6 | Hongqi | 2025 | First | Mid-size SUV, PHEV |
| | HS5 | 红旗HS5 | Hongqi | 2019 | First | Compact SUV, ICE/PHEV |
| | HS3 | 红旗HS3 | Hongqi | 2023 | First | Compact SUV, ICE/PHEV |
| | E-HS9 | 红旗E-HS9 | Tiangong | 2020 | First | Full-size SUV, BEV |
| | Tiangong 08/E-HS7 | 红旗天工08 | Tiangong | 2024 | First | Mid-size SUV, BEV |
| | Tiangong 06/EHS5 | 红旗天工06 | Tiangong | 2025 | First | Compact SUV, BEV |
| | E-HS4 | 红旗EHS4 | Tiangong | to commence | First | Compact SUV, BEV, rebadged Leapmotor B10 |
MPV
| | HQ9 | 红旗HQ9 | Hongqi | 2022 | First | Full-size MPV, ICE/PHEV |
Bus
| | Guoyue/QM7 | 红旗国悦 | Golden Sunflower | 2024 | First | Single-decker Minibus, ICE/PHEV(EREV) |

=== Bestune ===
| Image | Name(s) | Chinese name | Introduction (cal. year) | Generation | Vehicle description |
Car
| | Pony | 奔腾小马 | 2024 | First | City car, BEV |

=== FAW Yueyi ===
| Image | Name(s) | Chinese name | Introduction (cal. year) | Generation | Vehicle description |
Car
| | Yueyi 08 | 一汽悦意08 | 2026 | First | Mid-size sedan, BEV/EREV |
SUV
| | Yueyi 07 | 一汽悦意07 | 2025 | First | Mid-size SUV, PHEV variant of Bestune T90 |
| | Yueyi 03 | 一汽悦意03 | 2025 | First | Compact SUV, BEV |

== Former vehicles ==
=== Hongqi (post-2010s) ===
| Image | Name | Chinese name | Introduction (cal. year) | Discontinued | Generation | Vehicle description |
SUV
| | LS5 | 红旗LS5 | 2015 | 2017 | First | Full-size SUV |
| | E-HS3 | 红旗E-HS3 | 2019 | 2023 | First | Subcompact SUV, BEV |

=== Hongqi (pre-2010s) ===
| Image | Name | Chinese name | Introduction (cal. year) | Discontinued | Vehicle description |
Car
| | Dongfeng CA71 | 东风CA71 | 1958 | 1961 | Mid-size sedan |
| | CA72 | 红旗CA72 | 1958 | 1965 | Full-size sedan |
| | CA770 | 红旗CA770 | 1966 | 1981 | Full-size sedan |
| | CA774 | 红旗CA774 | 1972 | 1979 | Full-size sedan |
| | CA7200/7220/100 | 红旗100 | 1996 | 2005 | Mid-size sedan, rebadged Audi 100 |
| | CA7460/CA7400/Flag Ship | 红旗旗舰 | 1998 | 2005 | Full-size sedan, rebadged 3rd gen Lincoln Town Car |
| | CA7202/Century Star | 红旗世纪星 | 2000 | 2006 | Mid-size sedan |
| | CA7180/Mingshi | 红旗明仕 | 2001 | 2003 | Mid-size sedan, rebadged Audi 100 |
| | HQ3/Shengshi | 红旗HQ3/红旗盛世 | 2006 | 2010 | Full-size sedan, rebadged 4th gen Toyota Crown Majesta |
Bus
| | CA630 | 红旗CA630 | 1980 | | Mini bus |

=== Bestune ===
| Image | Name | Chinese name | Introduction (cal. year) | Discontinued | Generation | Vehicle description |
Car
| | B90 | 奔腾B90 | 2012 | 2017 | First | Mid-size sedan |
| | B70 | 奔腾B70 | 2006 | 2026 | Third | Mid-size sedan |
| | B50 | 奔腾B50 | 2009 | 2019 | Second | Compact sedan |
| | B30 | 奔腾B30 | 2015 | 2020 | First | Subcompact sedan |
SUV
| | B70S | 奔腾B70S | 2022 | 2025 | First | Compact SUV, SUV variant of B70 |
| | X80 | 奔腾X80 | 2013 | 2020 | First | Compact SUV |
| | X40 | 奔腾X40 | 2016 | 2019 | First | Subcompact SUV |
| | T99 | 奔腾T99 | 2019 | 2025 | First | Mid-size SUV |
| | T90 | 奔腾T90 | 2023 | 2026 | First | Mid-size SUV |
| | T77 | 奔腾T77 | 2018 | 2025 | First | Compact SUV |
| | T55 | 奔腾T55 | 2021 | 2025 | First | Compact SUV |
| | T33 | 奔腾T33 | 2019 | 2022 | First | Subcompact SUV |
| | E01 | 奔腾E01 | 2020 | 2025 | First | Compact SUV, BEV |
MPV
| | M9 | 奔腾M9 | 2023 | 2025 | First | Full-size MPV |
| | NAT | 奔腾NAT | 2021 | 2026 | First | Compact MPV, BEV |

=== FAW Tianjin ===
| Image | Name | Chinese name | Introduction (cal. year) | Discontinued | Generation | Vehicle description |
Cars
| | Xiali/Xiali Junya/Xiali Shenya/Xiali A+/Xiali N3 | 夏利/夏利骏雅/夏利绅雅/夏利A+/夏利N3 | 1988 | 2012 | First | Subcompact sedan/hatchback |
| | Xiali 2000/Yaku/Vela | 夏利2000/雅酷/威乐 | 2000 | 2012 | First | Subcompact sedan |
| | Vizi | 威姿 | 2002 | 2012 | First | Subcompact hatchback |
| | Weizhi | 威志 | 2006 | 2011 | First | Subcompact sedan/hatchback |
| | Xiali N5 | 夏利N5 | 2009 | 2017 | First | Subcompact sedan |
| | Weizhi V2 | 威志V2 | 2010 | 2013 | First | Subcompact hatchback |
| | Weizhi V5 | 威志V5 | 2012 | 2015 | First | Subcompact sedan |
| | Junpai A70 | 骏派A70 | 2016 | 2018 | First | Compact sedan |
| | Junpai A50 | 骏派A50 | 2018 | 2019 | First | Compact sedan |
| | Junpai CX65 | 骏派CX65 | 2018 | 2019 | First | Compact wagon |
SUV
| | Xiali N7 | 夏利N7 | 2013 | 2019 | First | Subcompact SUV |
| | Junpai D60 | 骏派D60 | 2014 | 2019 | First | Subcompact SUV |
| | Junpai D80 | 骏派D80 | 2018 | 2019 | First | Compact SUV |
Van
| | Huali Dafa | 华利大发 | 1984 | 2002 | First | Microvan |

=== FAW Jilin ===
| Image | Name | Chinese name | Introduction (cal. year) | Discontinued | Generation | Vehicle description |
SUV
| | Senya R7 | 森雅R7 | 2016 | 2019 | First | Subcompact SUV |
| | Senya R9 | 森雅R9 | 2018 | 2019 | First | Compact SUV |
| | Senya S80 | 森雅S80 | 2010 | 2016 | First | Mini Crossover |
MPV
| | Senya M80 | 森雅M80 | 2009 | 2016 | First | Mini MPV |
Van
| | Jiabao V70 | 佳宝V70 | 2009 | 2015 | First | Van |
| | Jiabao V52/V55 | 佳宝V52/V55 | 2011 | TBA | First | Van |
| | Jiabao V80 | 佳宝V80 | 2013 | TBA | First | Van |
| | Jiabao V75/V77 | 佳宝V75/V77 | 2015 | TBA | First | Van |

=== FAW Oley ===
| Image | Name | Chinese name | Introduction (cal. year) | Discontinued | Generation | Vehicle description |
Cars
| | Oley | 欧朗 | 2011 | 2016 | First | Subcompact sedan/hatchback |

== Concept cars ==
=== Hongqi ===
- 2005 Hongqi HQD
- 2007 Hongqi SUV Concept
- 2016 Hongqi B Concept
- 2016 Hongqi S Concept
- 2017 Hongqi U Concept
- 2018 Hongqi E-Jing GT Concept
- 2019 Hongqi S9 Concept
- 2019 Hongqi E115 Concept
- 2021 Hongqi L-Concept
- 2023 Hongqi E-LS Concept
- 2023 Hongqi E001 Concept
- 2023 Hongqi E202 Concept
- 2024 Hongqi Golden Sunflower Concept
- 2024 Hongqi E702 Concept
- 2024 Hongqi E007 Concept
- 2024 Hongqi E009 Concept
- 2025 Hongqi HS9 Concept
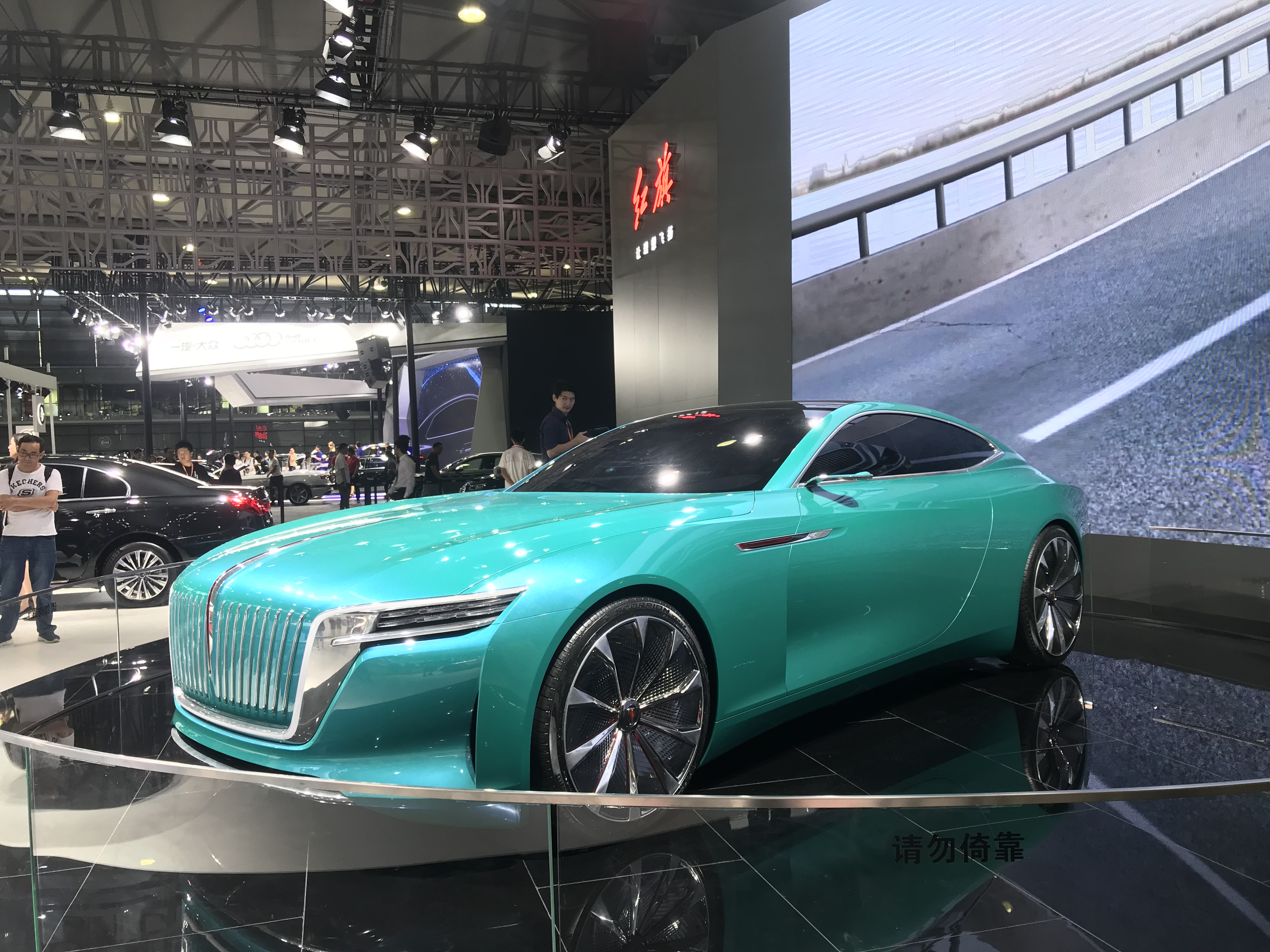
Hongqi E-Jing GT Concept

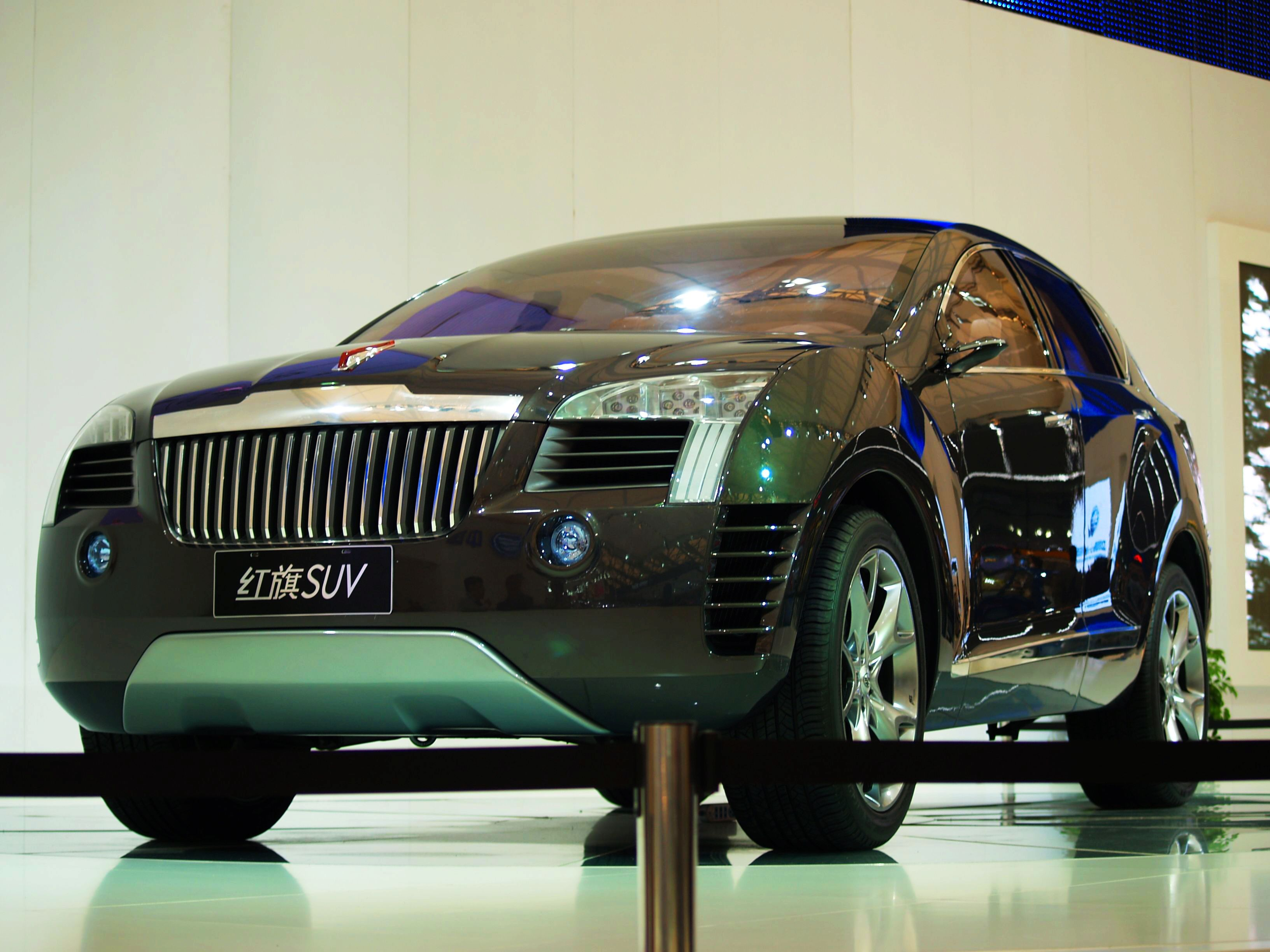
Hongqi SUV Concept

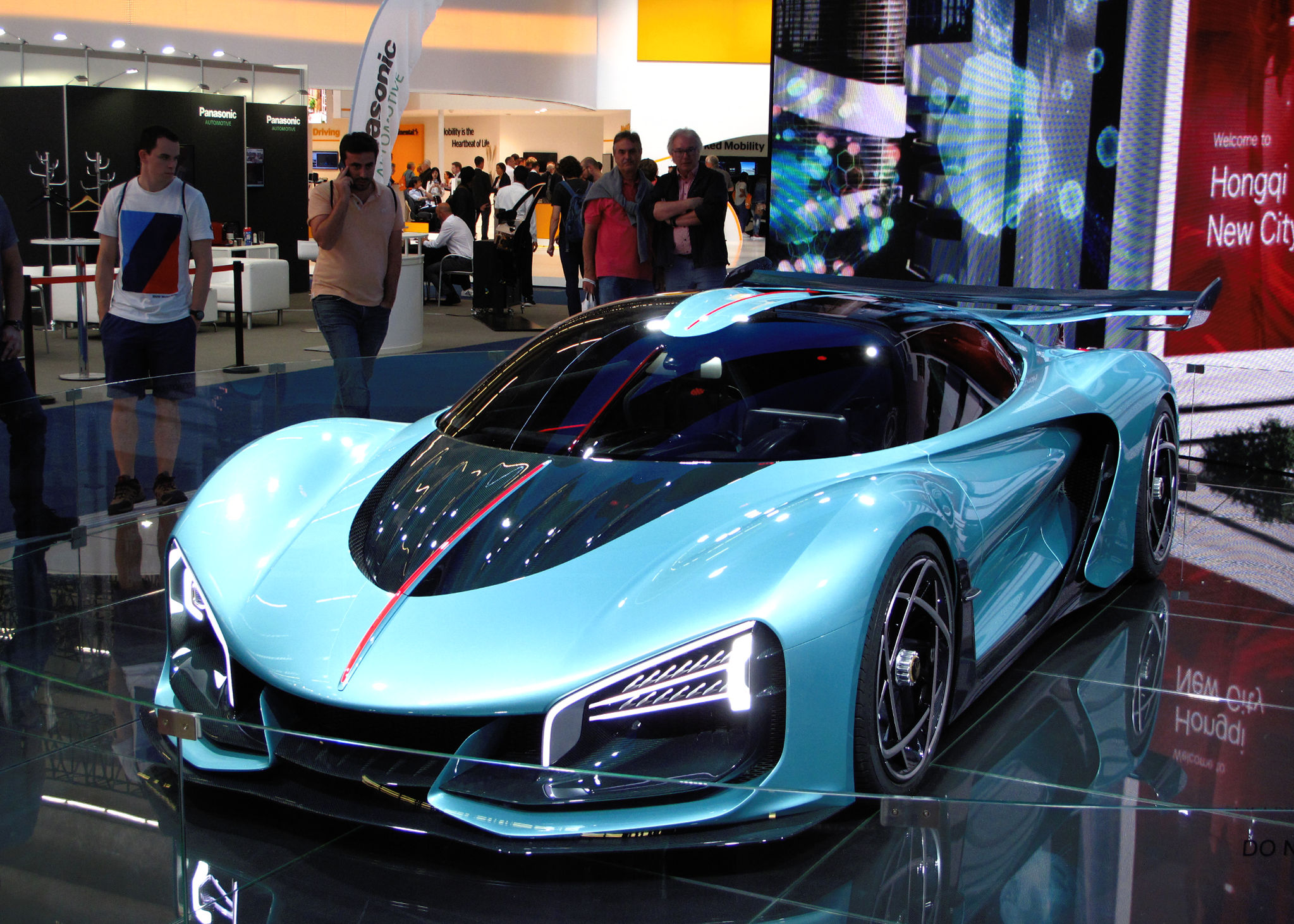
Hongqi S9 Concept

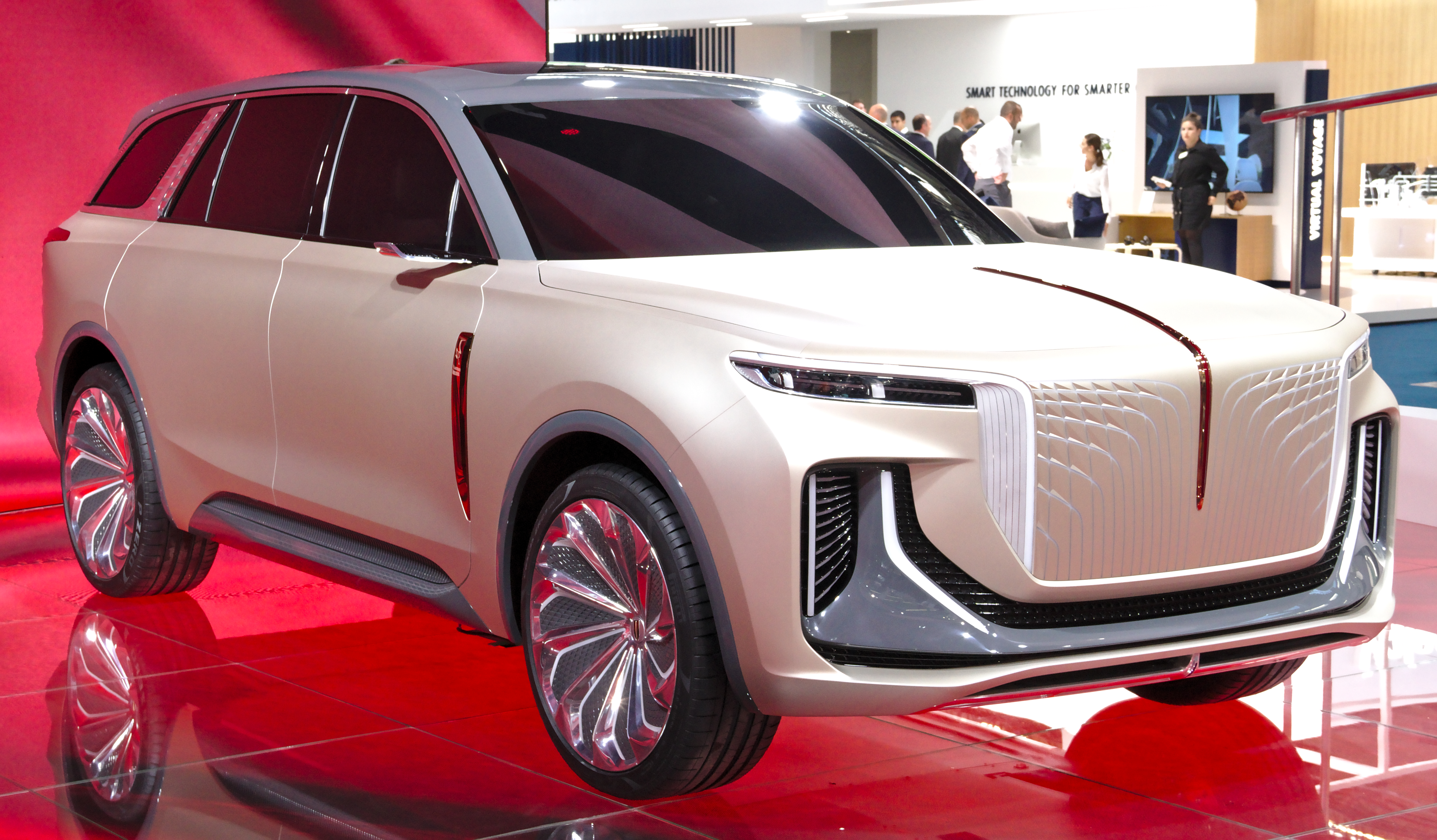
Hongqi E115 Concept

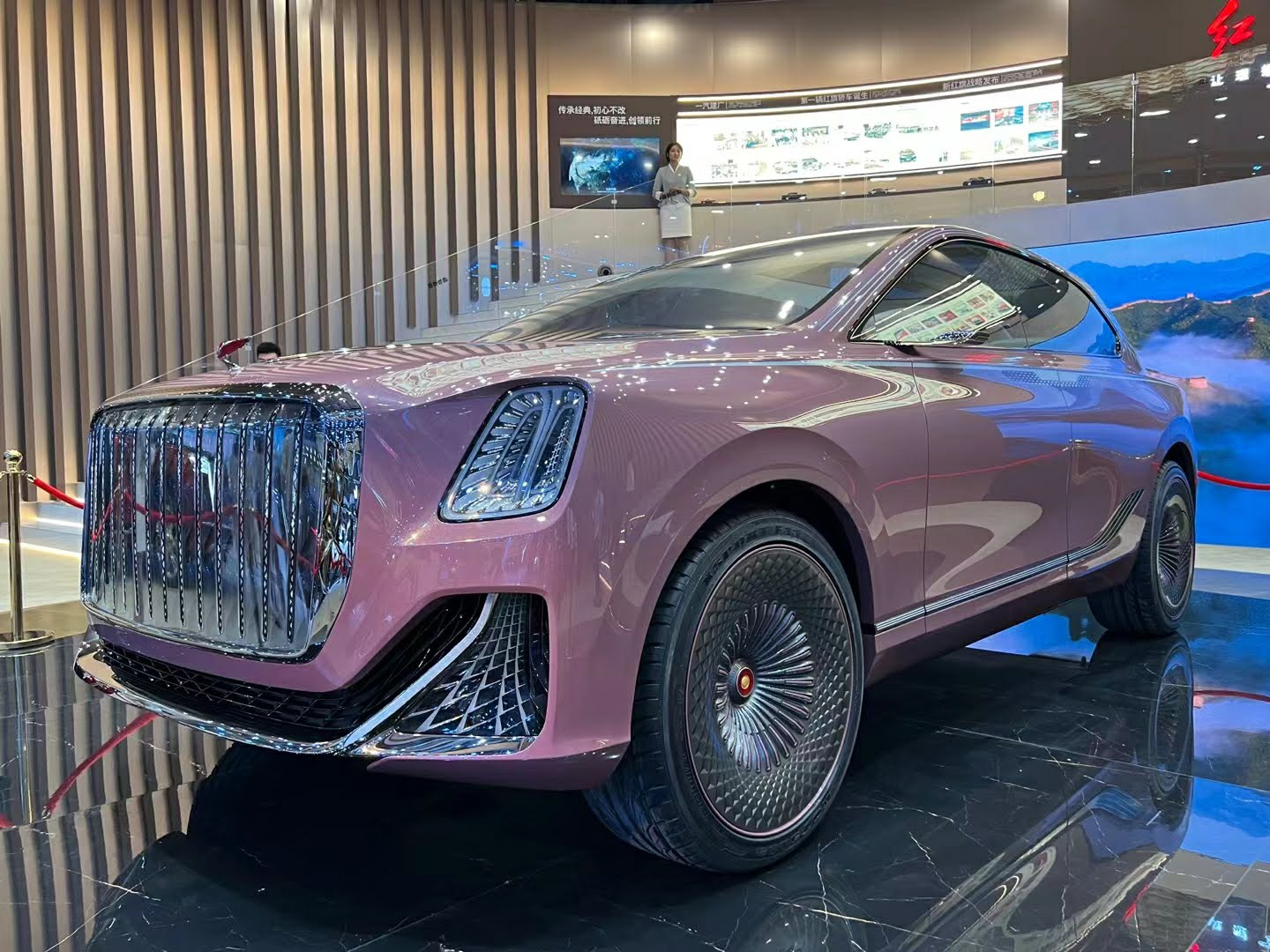
Hongqi E-LS Concept

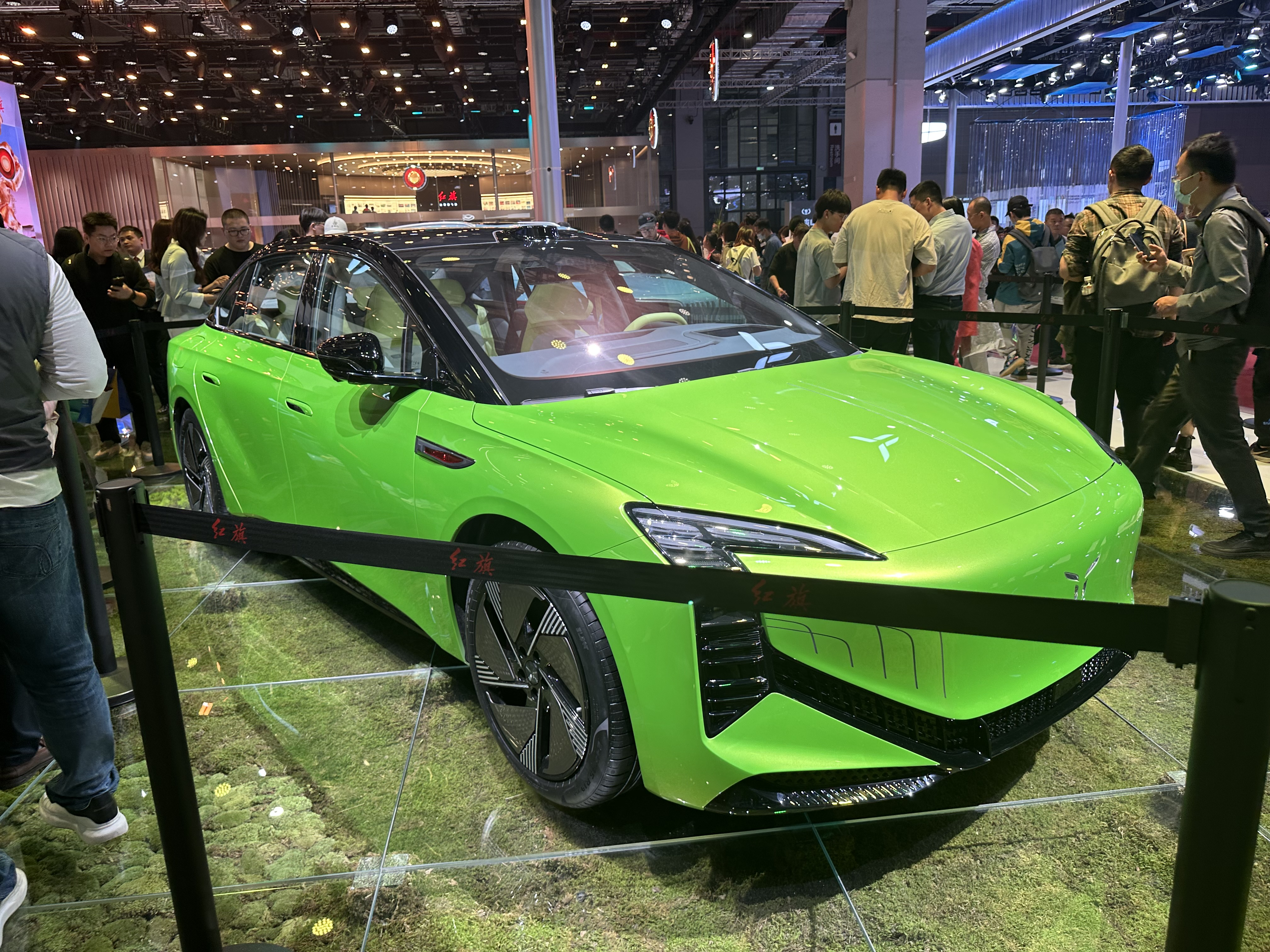
Hongqi E001 Concept

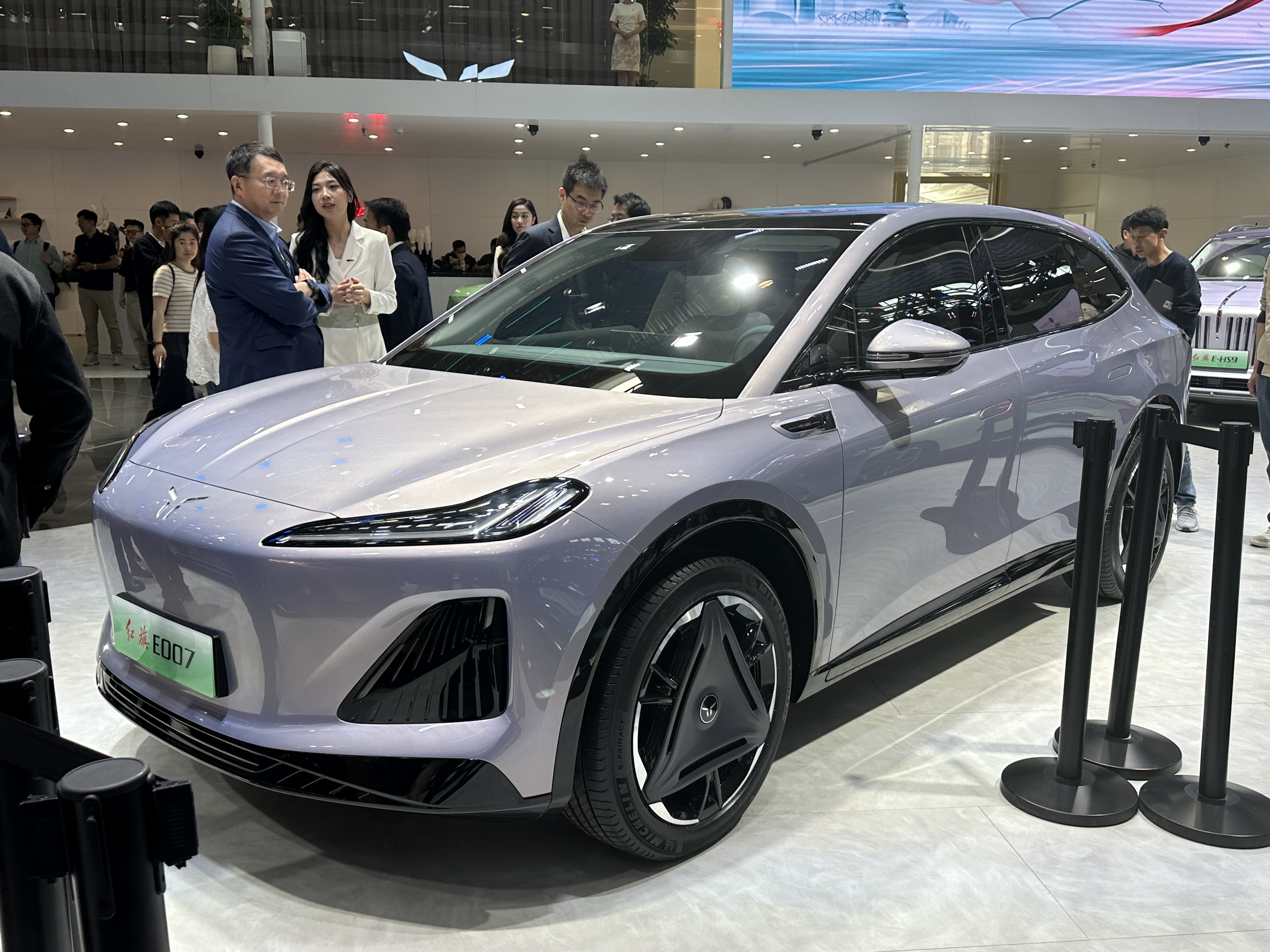
Hongqi E007 Concept

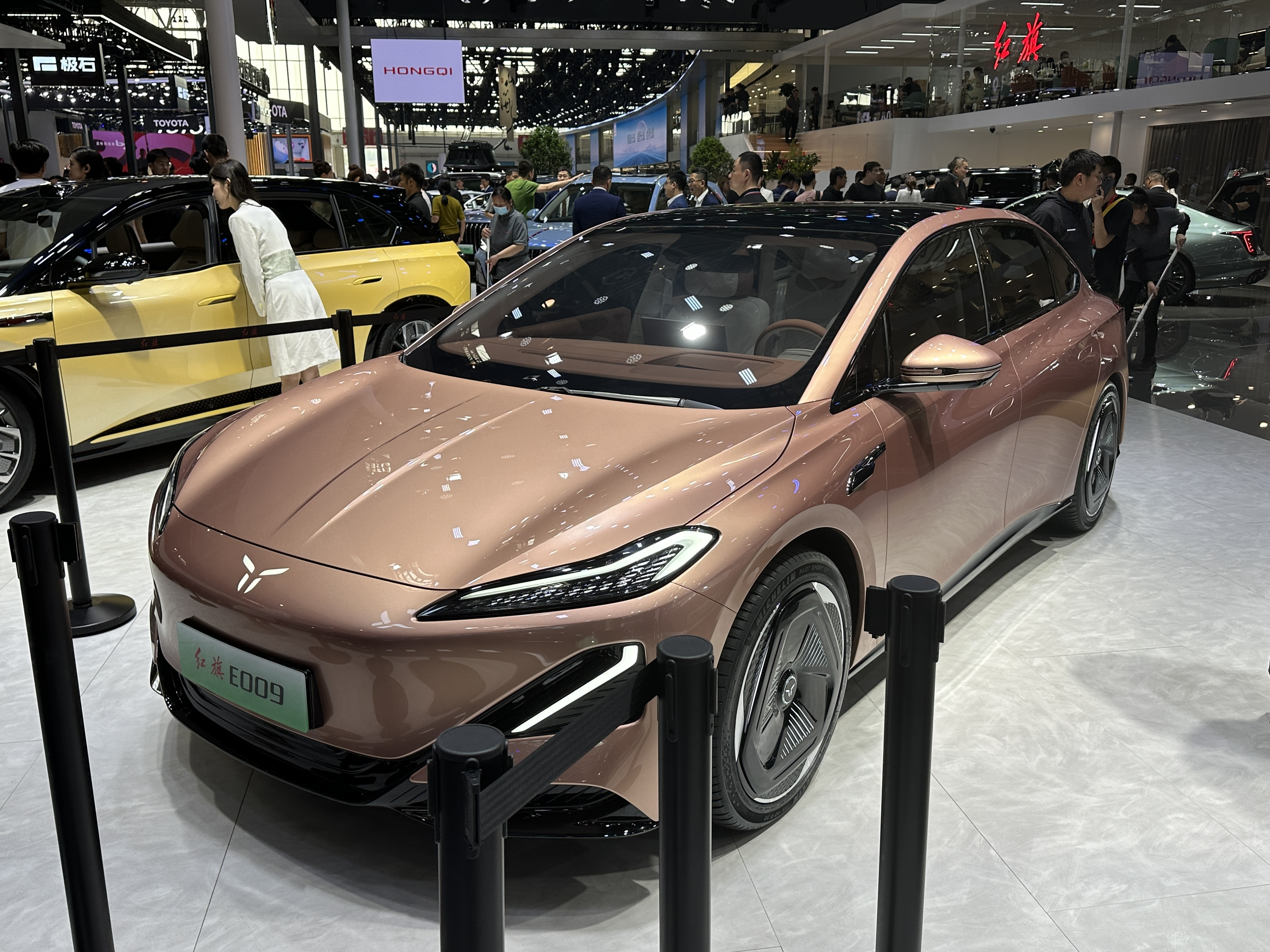
Hongqi E009 Concept

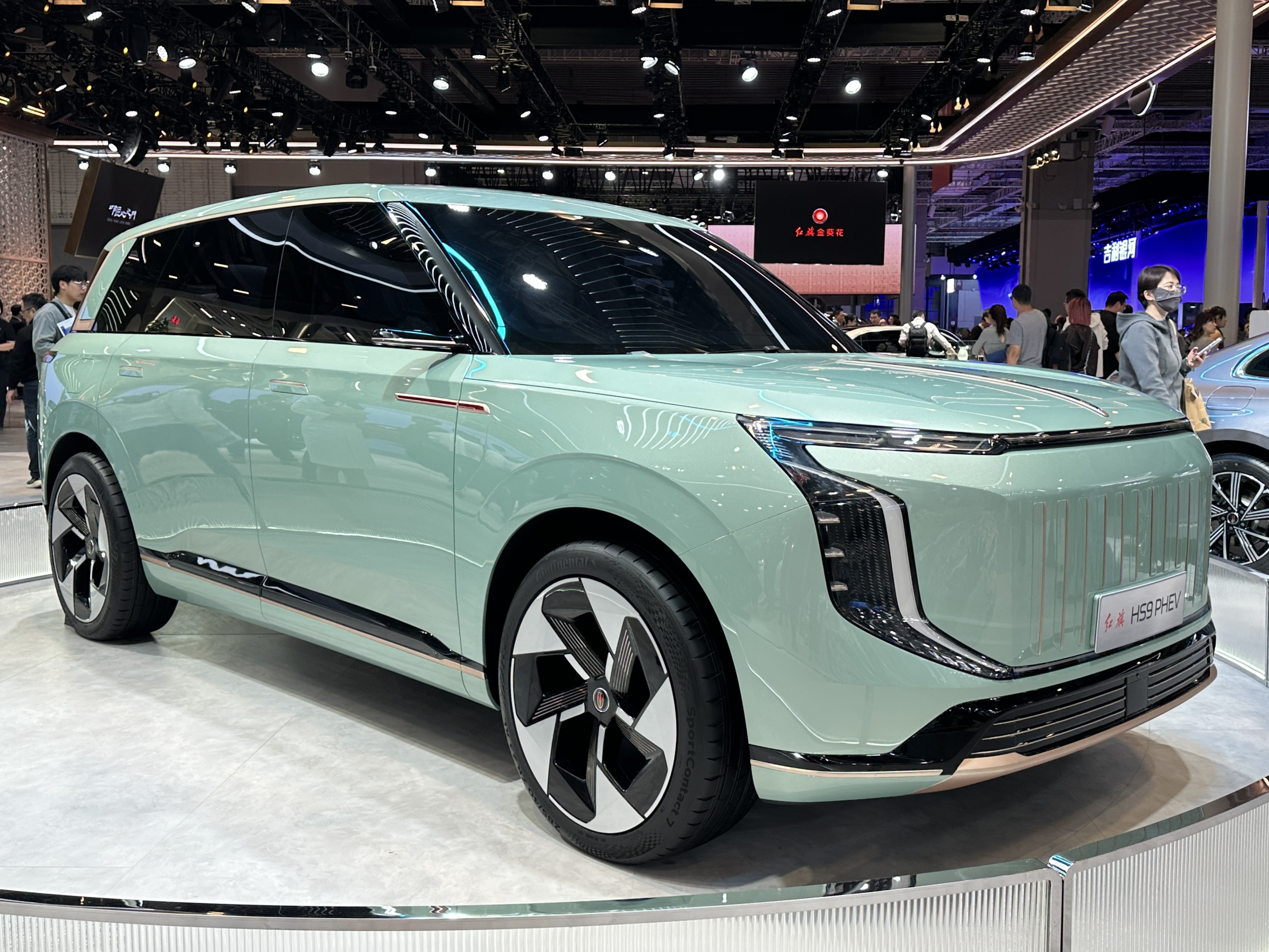
Hongqi HS9 Concept

=== Bestune ===
- 2014 Bestune Pi Concept
- 2016 Bestune X4 Concept
- 2016 Bestune X6 Concept
- 2018 Bestune E2 Concept
- 2019 Bestune C105 Concept
- 2019 Bestune T2 Concept
- 2020 Bestune B² Concept
- 2021 Bestune Concept Sedan
- 2021 Bestune Concept SUV
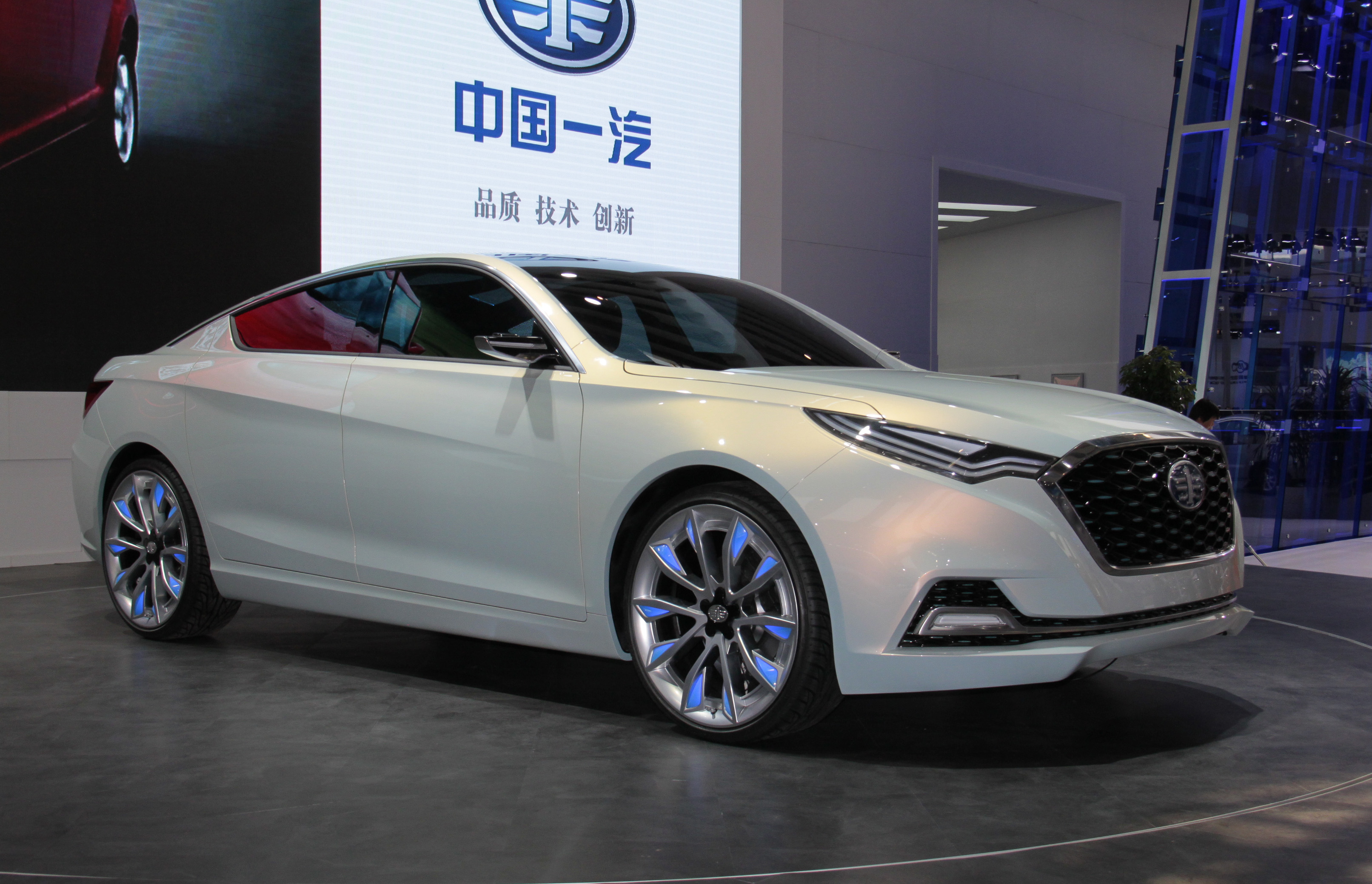
Bestune Pi Concept
