= V77 =

V77 may refer to:

- Jiabao V77, a microvan
- Mali-V77, a GPU
- Vultee V-77, an American liaison aircraft
