= V75 =

V75 may refer to:

== Biology and medicine ==
- Vitronectin, a glycoprotein
- V75, Special screening examination for other infectious diseases, in the ICD-9 V codes

== Vehicular ==
- Jiabao V75, a microvan
- Vultee V-75, an American liaison aircraft
- Bell MV-75 (V-280), the multipurpose version of the V-75 basic model tilt-rotor aircraft
- Yamaha V75, a variant of the Yamaha V50 (motorcycle)

== Other uses ==
- ITU V.75, CCITT standard for DVSD terminal control procedures
