= Silk-FAW Automotive =

Chinese-American auto company

Silk-FAW Automotive Group
- Company type: Joint venture
- Industry: Automotive
- Founded: April 2021
- Headquarters: Reggio nell'Emilia, Emilia-Romagna, Italy
- Area served: China
- Key people: Jonathan A. Krane (Chief Executive Officer, Founder of Silk EV); Walter de Silva (Vice President of Styling and Design)
- Products: Supercars
- Parent: FAW Group; Silk EV
- Website: www.silkfaw.com

Silk-FAW Automotive is a joint venture between Chinese auto manufacturer FAW group and Italy-based Silk EV founded in 2021. Based in Reggio Emilia, Silk-FAW automotive plans to invest up to US$1.2 billion to design, develop and build high performance electric cars with production planned in Italy as well as China.

In 2021 Silk-FAW started production on its first car, the Hongqi S9. Designed by Walter de Silva, the S9 features a hybrid powertrain with a 4-liter twin-turbocharged V8, which produces over 1,300 Horsepower and a top speed of close to 250 MPH. Silk-FAW plans to manufacture a line of 'S' cars, the S3, 35, and S7 respectively.

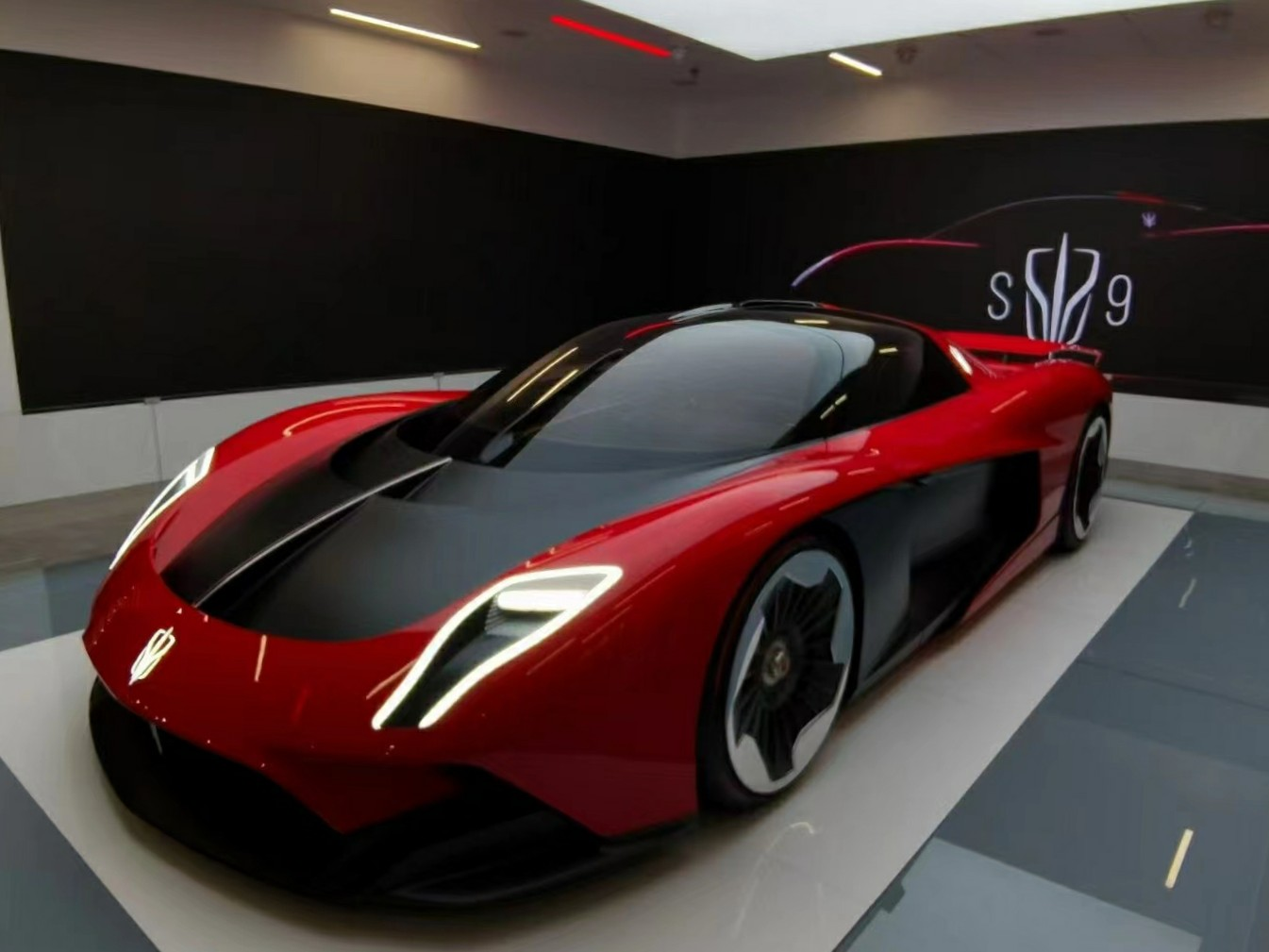
The Silk-FAW manufactured S9

== History ==
=== Hongqi S9 Concept ===
In September 2019, the Chinese company FAW Group presented a prototype of a fully electric hypercar brand Hongqi, previously focused on luxury limousines and SUVs. Hongqi S9 Concept debuted at the IAA 2019 international trade fair in Frankfurt am Main, announcing the debut of its production version two years later.

=== Joint-venture ===
In order to develop the production Hongqi S9, FAW Group decided to cooperate with the Italian engineering and design company Silk EV. The partnership was intended to acquire experienced engineers and designers as well as technological resources. In April 2020, a joint-venture company called Silk-FAW was established, which was officially launched in February 2021. At the same time, it was announced that the alliance would also engage in long-term cooperation in the development of other luxury, electrified sports cars for Chinese and global markets. Production of future Silk-FAW vehicles has been indicated at both Italy and the FAW plant in Changchun, China.

With the launch of Silk-FAW in February 2021, it was announced that the famous Italian stylist Walter de Silva was at the helm of the design department, whose first project was the production Hongqi S9. 3 months later, another experienced Italian in the automotive industry, former CEO of Ferrari Amedeo Felisa, joined the Silk-FAW team.

A month earlier, during the Shanghai Auto Show 2021, the official world premiere of the production Hongqi S9 took place. The hypercar received a completely new body design by Walter de Silva, however, despite the dedicated Silk-FAW company logo, it was decided to keep the Hongqi brand for it. The production vehicle is not a fully electric car, but a plug-in hybrid. In May 2021, it was announced that the Hongqi S9 will be a strictly limited vehicle that will be built in 99 units at the Italian Silk EV factory in Modena. However, these plans did not come to fruition due to legal problems of the Italian subsidiary of the joint venture, as a result, limited production plans were transferred to China without a specific date or pool. In May 2023, Hongqi S9 was exhibited at the prestigious Italian Concorso d'Eleganza Villa d'Este event., while after 2023 the company no longer continued its operations.
