= Hongqi S9 =

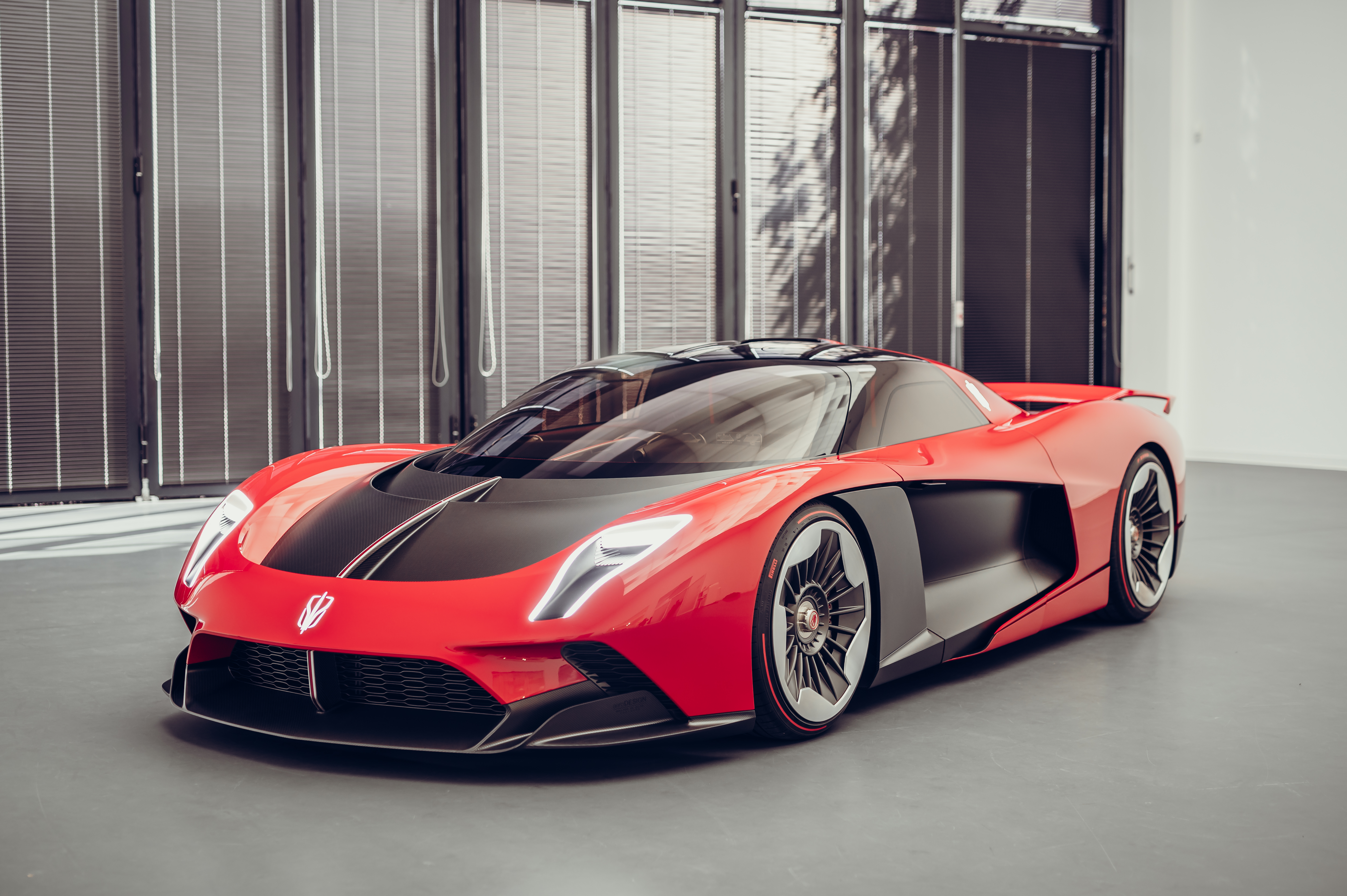

Overview
- Manufacturer: Hongqi (Silk-FAW Automotive)
- Production: 2021–2023 (99 Units)
- Assembly: Italy: Reggio Emilia (Silk-FAW Automotive); China: Changchun, Jilin
- Designer: Walter de Silva; Yangfeng Ding (concept)

Body and chassis
- Class: Sports car (S)
- Body style: 2-door coupé
- Layout: Rear mid-engine, rear-wheel-drive
- Doors: Butterfly

Powertrain
- Engine: 4.0 L CA74000 twin-turbocharged V8
- Electric motor: 3x e-motors
- Power output: 1 MW (1,381 hp; 1,400 PS) total
- Electric range: 40 km (25 miles)

Dimensions
- Length: 4,885 mm (192.3 in)
- Width: 2,053 mm (80.8 in)
- Height: 1,166 mm (45.9 in)

The Hongqi S9 is a hybrid sports car produced by Chinese automobile manufacturer Hongqi, a subsidiary of FAW Group, which was presented at the 2019 Frankfurt Motor Show.

== Presentation ==
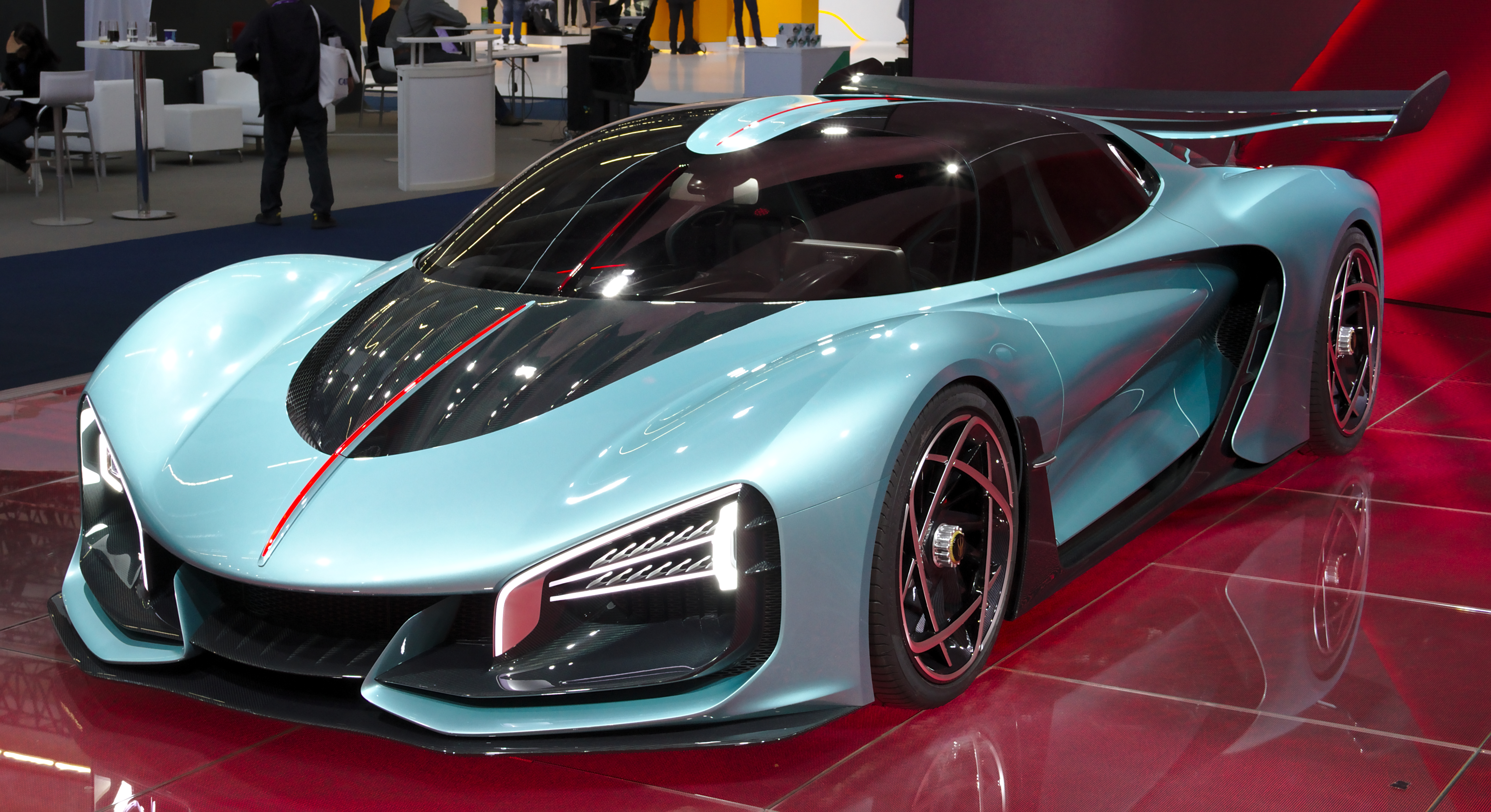
Hongqi S9 concept

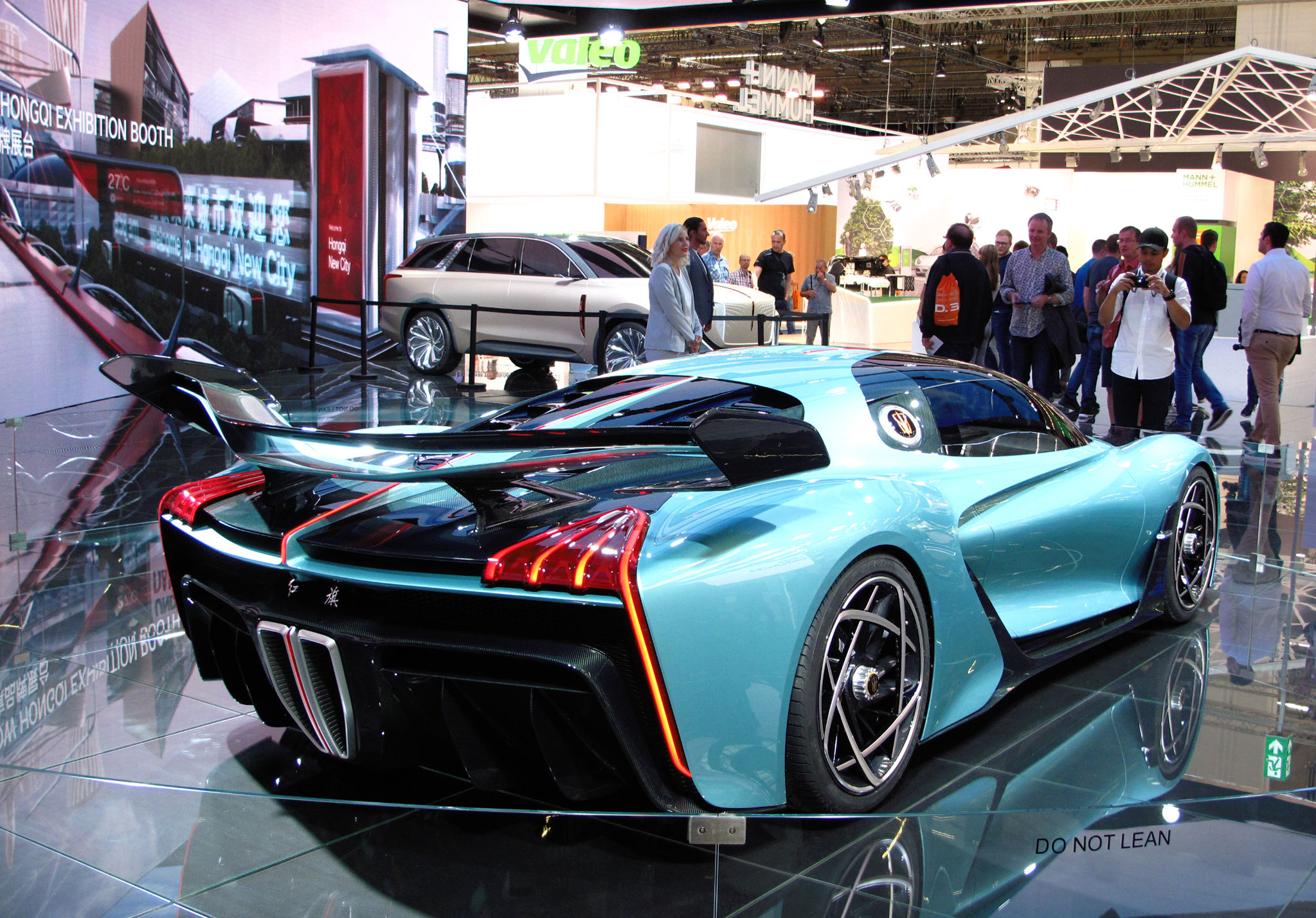
Hongqi S9 concept rear

The Hongqi S9 concept was presented on 13 September 2019 at the Frankfurt Motor Show and celebrates 70 years of the People's Republic of China. It foreshadows the plan to launch a hybrid supercar from the Chinese manufacturer limited to 70 copies.

In 2021, the FAW Group announced that it will build the car in the Emilia-Romagna region of Italy as part of a joint venture with Silk EV and hired former Alfa Romeo, SEAT and Audi designer Walter de Silva as Vice President of Styling and Design for a range of Hongqi S vehicles. The production version of the S9 was introduced in 2021 Auto Shanghai.

== Technical characteristics ==
The S9 is powered by a combustion 4.0 L twin-turbo V8 engine associated with a hybrid system, providing it with an output of 1,400 PS (1,381 hp).
