= Hongqi HQ9 =

Large MPV

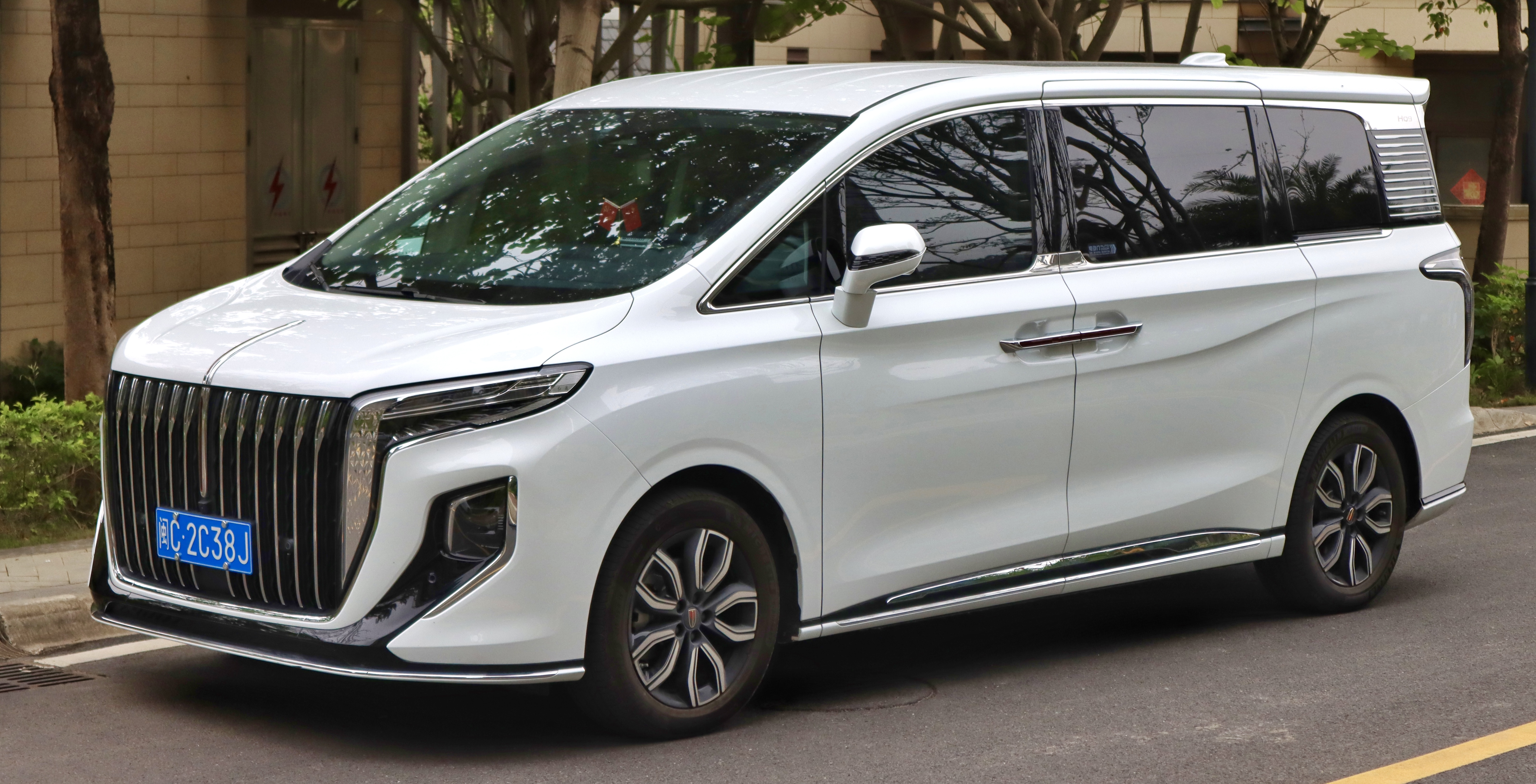

Overview
- Manufacturer: Hongqi (FAW Group)
- Model code: D711 (Bestune M9)
- Also called: Bestune M9; Hongqi C095 (development code)
- Production: 2022–present (Hongqi HQ9); 2023–2025 (Bestune M9)
- Assembly: China: Changchun, Jilin
- Designer: Giles Taylor

Body and chassis
- Class: Large MPV (M)
- Body style: 5-door minivan

Powertrain
- Engine: 2.0 L CA4GC20TD-35 I4
- Electric motor: 48 V permanent magnet synchronous motor
- Power output: 252 hp (188 kW; 255 PS)
- Transmission: 8-speed automatic
- Hybrid drivetrain: Power-split
- Battery: 1.6 kWh nickel–metal hydride

Dimensions
- Wheelbase: 3,200 mm (126.0 in)
- Length: 5,222 mm (205.6 in)
- Width: 2,005 mm (78.9 in)
- Height: 1,892 mm (74.5 in)
- Curb weight: 2,885 kg (6,360 lb)

The Hongqi HQ9 is a large MPV produced by Chinese automobile manufacturer Hongqi, a subsidiary of FAW Group.

== Overview ==
The HQ9 is a 7-seater vehicle. The interior features leather seats, wooden trim, and a two-screen setup. The center console is dominated by a large wireless charging pad and additionally, a 16-speaker Dynaudio sound system is in charge of the music. The front row of the HQ9 has a digital instrument cluster and a central infotainment screen on the dashboard.

The HQ9 is powered by a 2.0-litre turbocharged gasoline engine plus 48V mild hybrid system with a maximum output of 252 hp and 380Nm, mated to an eight-speed semi-automatic transmission. Acceleration time from 0 to 100 km/h (62 mph) is 9.5 seconds and fuel consumption is 8.8L/100 km.

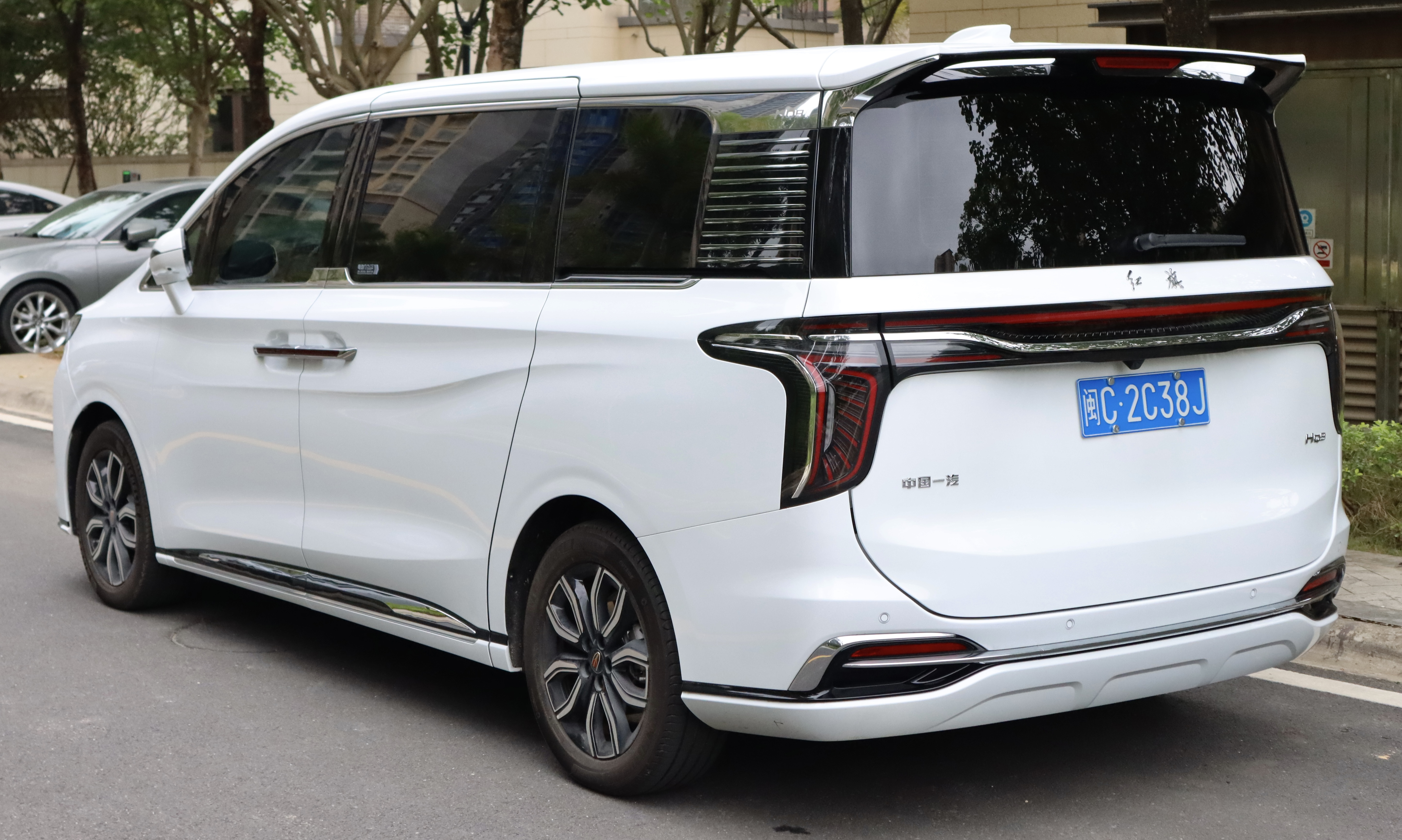
Rear view

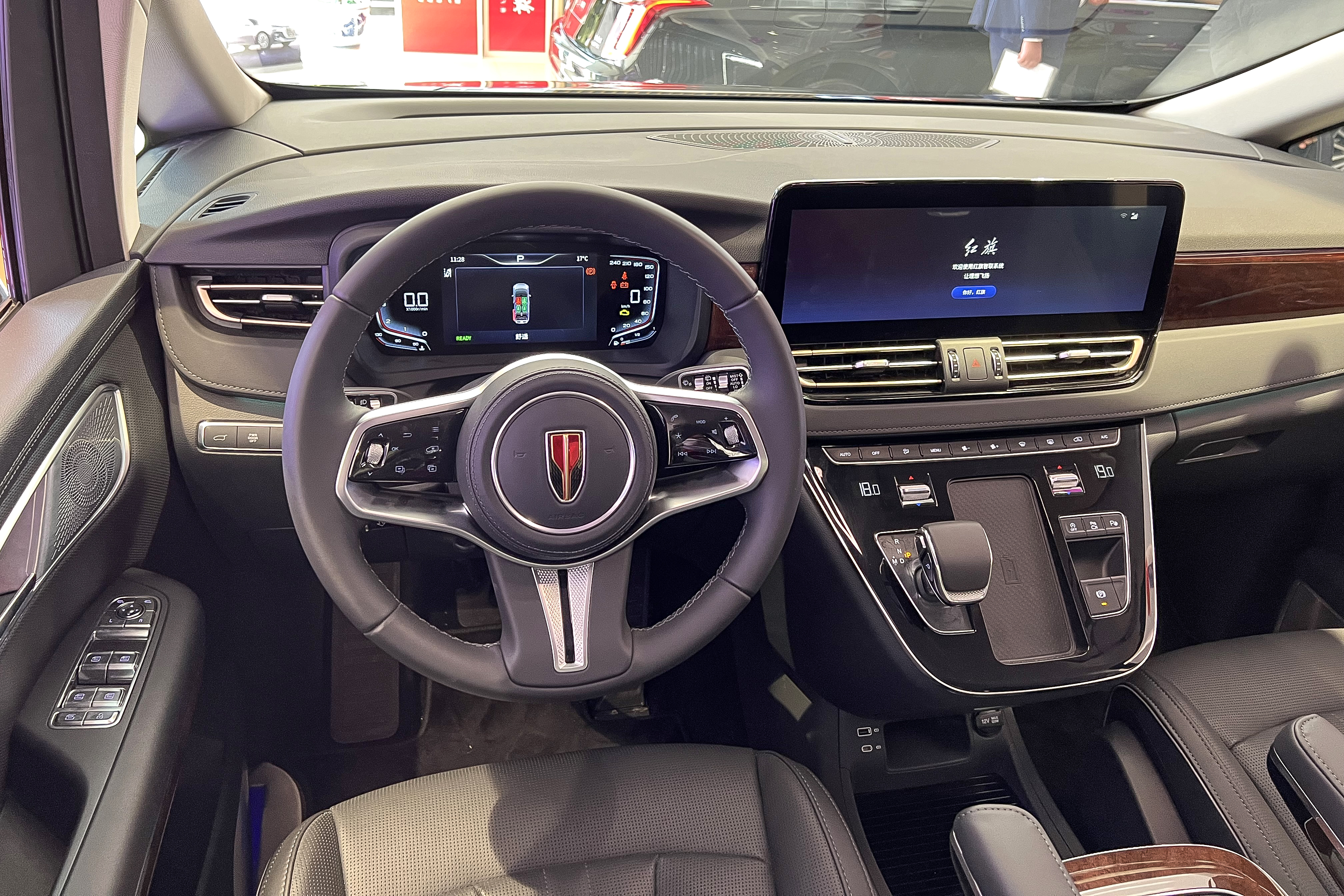
Interior

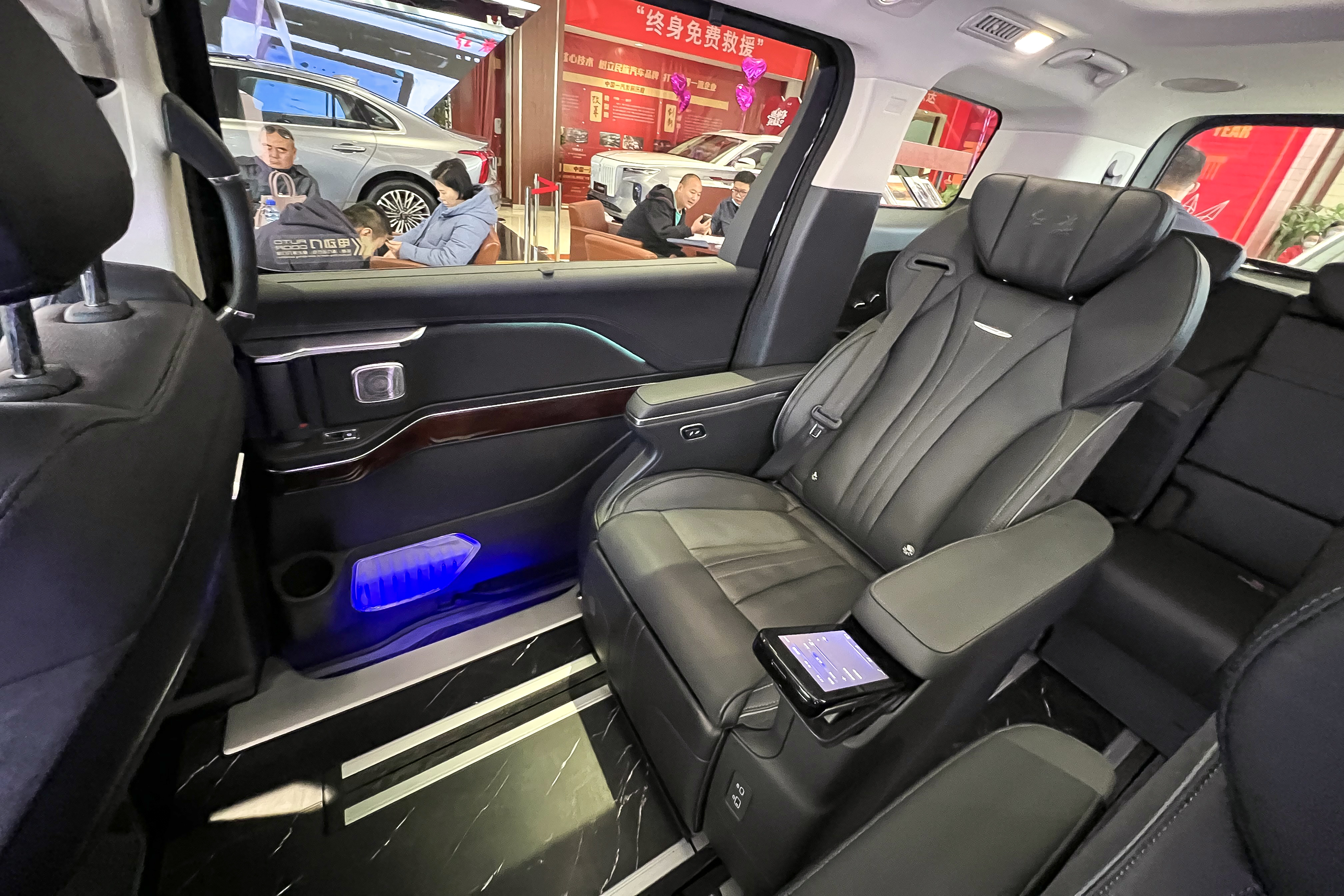
Rear passenger seating

== Bestune M9 ==
A rebadged version produced by Bestune was launched in November 2022 during the 2022 Guangzhou Auto Show. The Bestune version of the MPV was expected to be named the Bestune M9, and features restyled front and rear end designs.

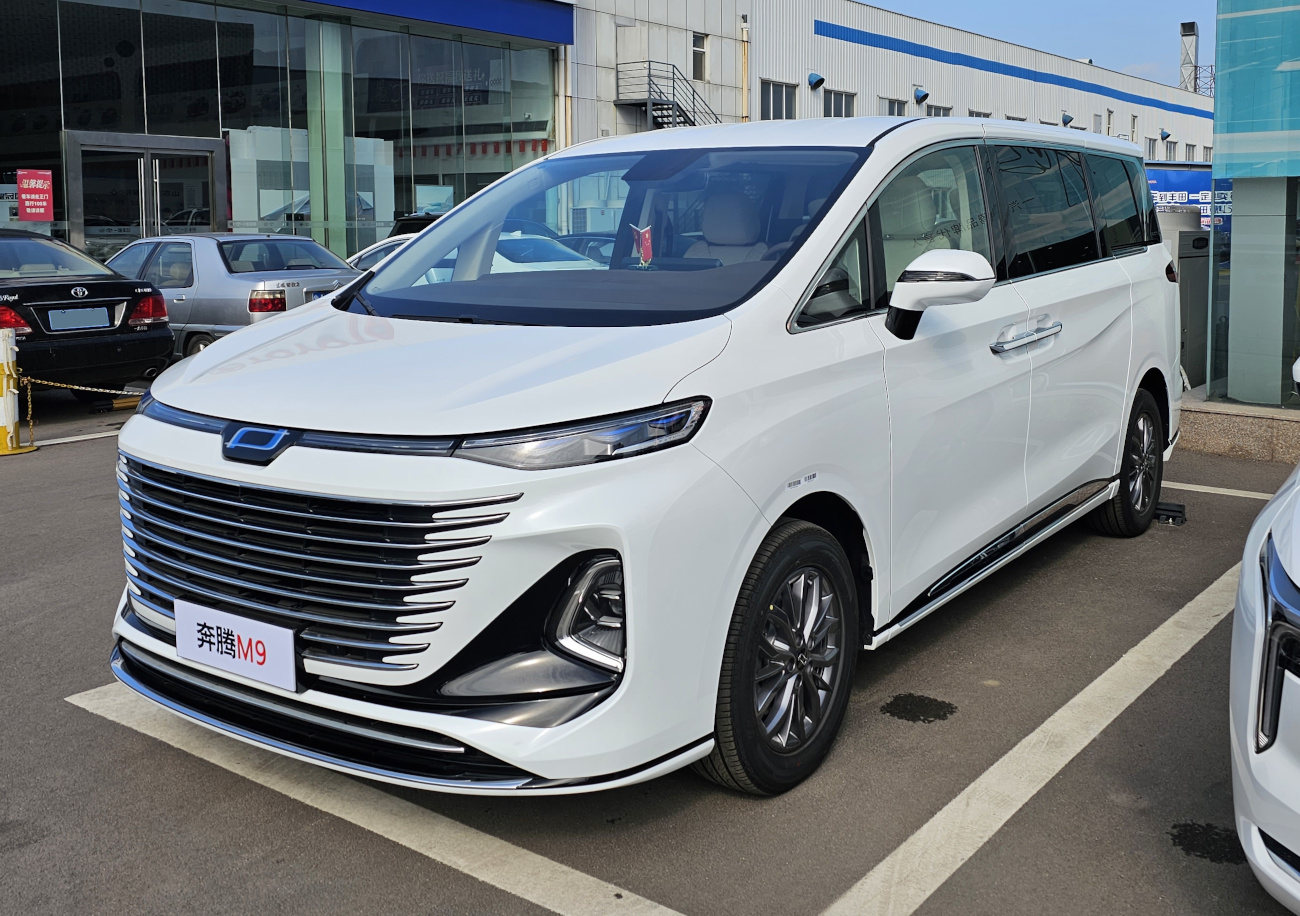
Bestune M9

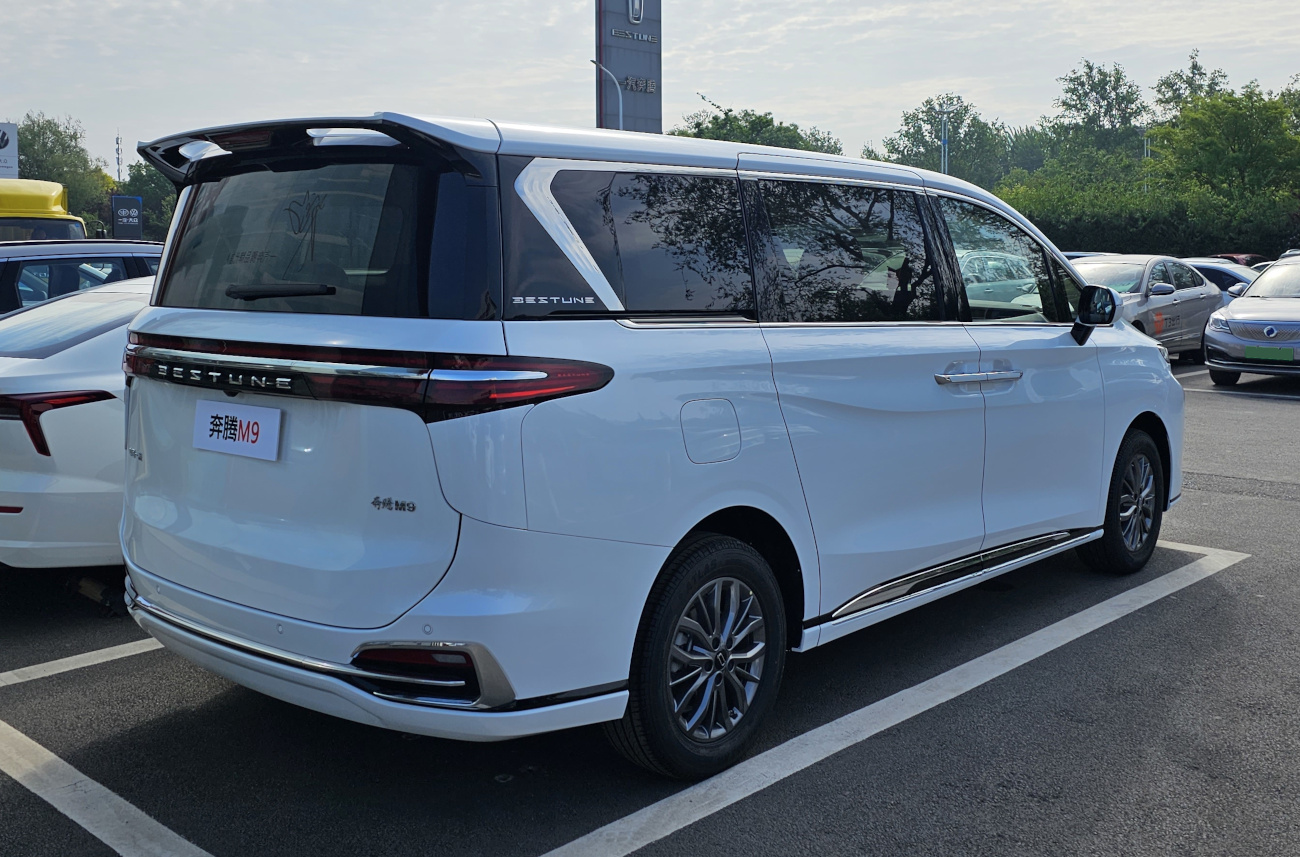
Rear view

== Sales ==
| Year | China | | | |
| Year | HQ9 | PHEV | M9 | Total |
|---|---|---|---|---|
| 2023 | 8,793 | – | 576 | 8,793 |
| 2024 | 1,248 | 3,877 | 558 | 5,125 |
| 2025 | 942 | 3,521 | 292 | 4,463 |
