= Junpai A70 =

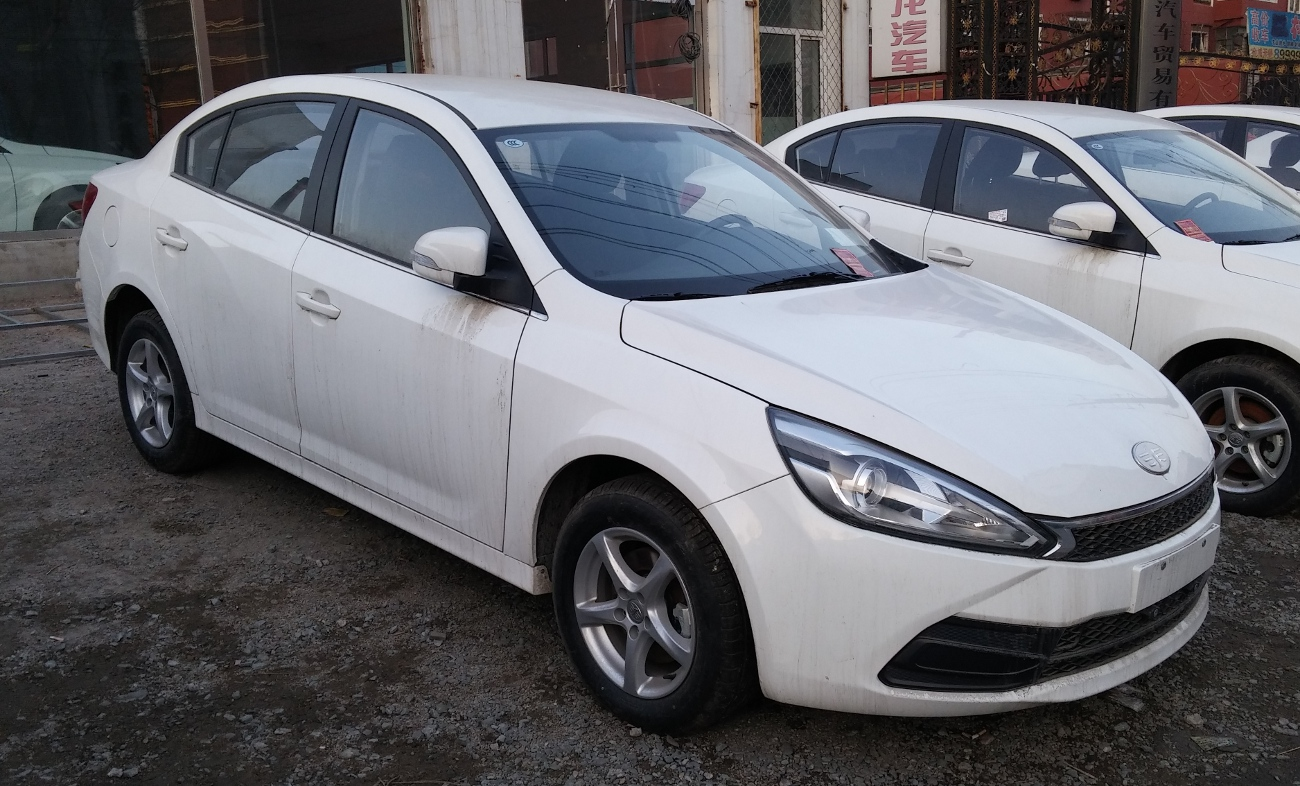
- Junpai A70

Overview
- Manufacturer: FAW Group - Junpai
- Production: 2016–2018
- Assembly: Tianjin, China

Body and chassis
- Class: Compact car (C)
- Body style: 4-door saloon
- Layout: Front engine, front-wheel-drive

Powertrain
- Engine: 1.6 L CA4GB16 I4 (Petrol) (A70)
- Electric motor: One 80 kW
- Transmission: 5 speed manual 6 speed automatic 1 speed Electric gearbox

Dimensions
- Wheelbase: 2,630 mm (104 in)
- Length: 4,610 mm (181 in) (4-door)
- Width: 1,790 mm (70 in)
- Height: 1,500 mm (59 in)

The Junpai A70 is a compact sedan produced by the FAW Group under the Junpai brand.

== Overview ==
The Junpai A70 was launched in the Chinese market in November 2015, with prices ranging from 64,800 yuan to 87,800 yuan. The Junpai A70 shares the same platform as the Besturn B30 subcompact sedan produced by FAW Group, and was classified as the A-class segment of the Chinese car market which is equivalent to the B-segment in foreign markets or subcompact cars.

The Junpai A70 debuted on the 2016 Beijing Auto Show in April 2016, with the market launch in August 2016.

An electric version is available as the A70E.
