= Junpai D80 =

Chinese subcompact crossover

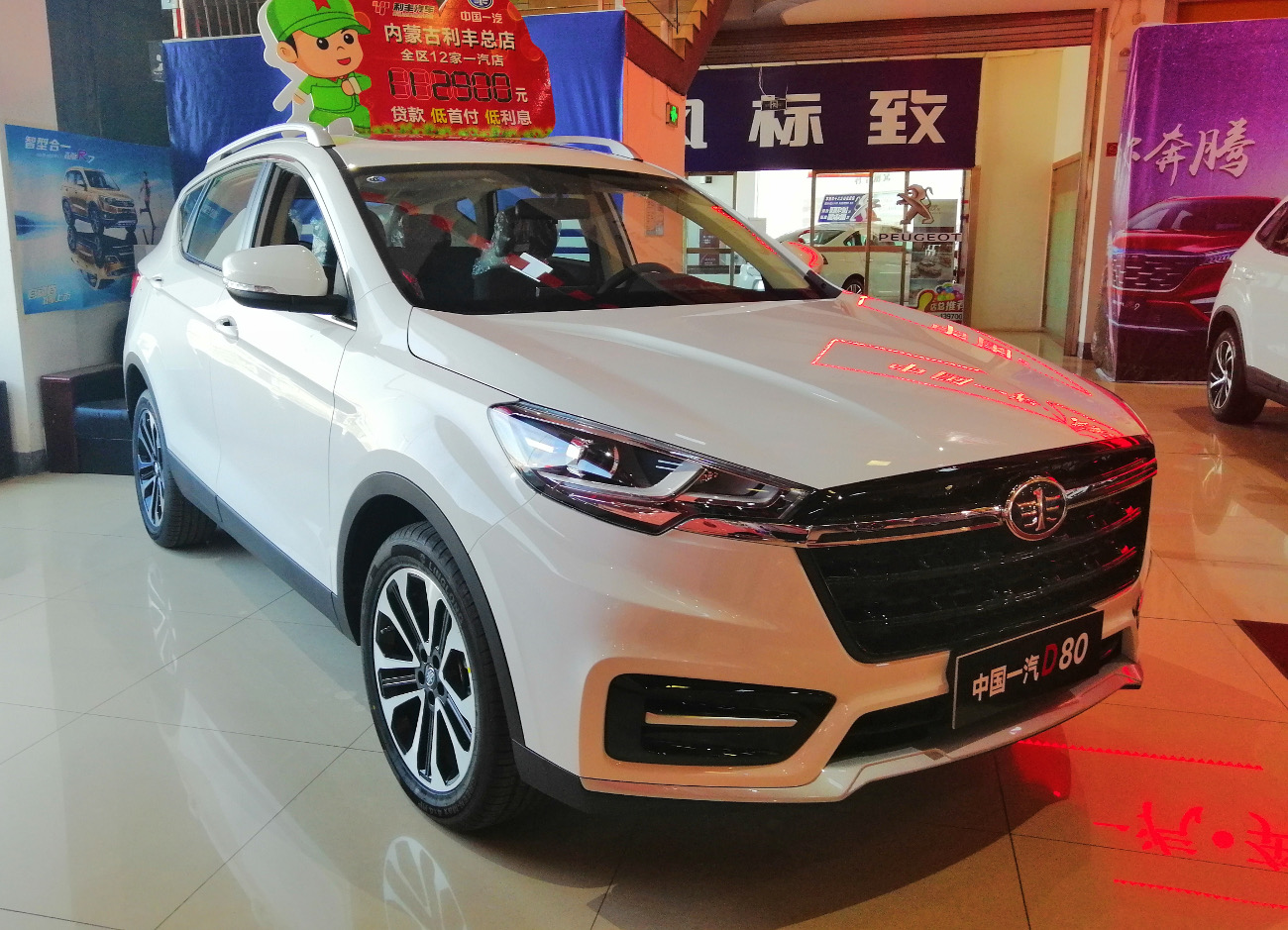

Overview
- Manufacturer: FAW Group
- Production: 2018–2019
- Model years: 2018–2019
- Assembly: Tianjin, China

Body and chassis
- Class: Compact crossover SUV
- Body style: 5-door station wagon
- Layout: FF

Powertrain
- Engine: 1.2 L FAW CA4GA12TD I4 (petrol)
- Transmission: 6-speed manual 7-speed DCT

Dimensions
- Wheelbase: 2,700 mm (106.3 in)
- Length: 4,500 mm (177.2 in)
- Width: 1,835 mm (72.2 in)
- Height: 1,700 mm (66.9 in)
- Curb weight: 1,405–1,435 kg (3,097–3,164 lb)

The Junpai D80 or Jumpal D80 is a compact crossover SUV produced by Jumpal or Junpai (骏派), a sub-brand of FAW Group.

== Overview ==
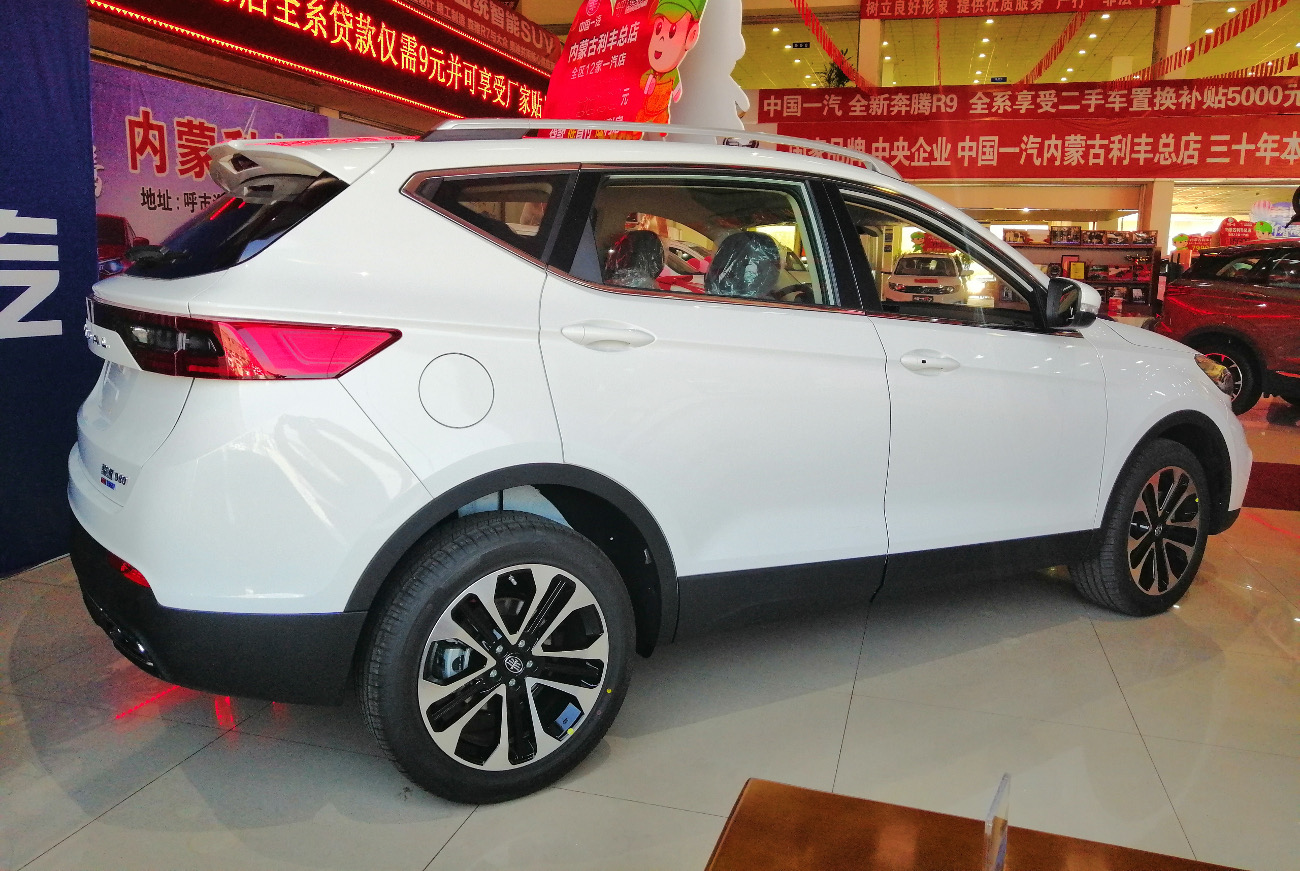
FAW Junpai D80 rear quarter

The Junpai D80 crossover was first launched in 2018. Formerly known as the FAW Junpai T086, the crossover was originally launched in January 2018. The Junpai D80 was available with a single option, a petrol-fueled four-cylinder 1.2 liter producing 143 hp (107 kW) and 204 N⋅m (150 lbf⋅ft) of torque, and two gearbox options available including a 6-speed manual gearbox and a 7-speed dual-clutch transmission. Prices of the Junpai D80 at launch ranges from 79,900 yuan to 125,900 yuan.
