= Junpai A50 =

Chinese compact sedan

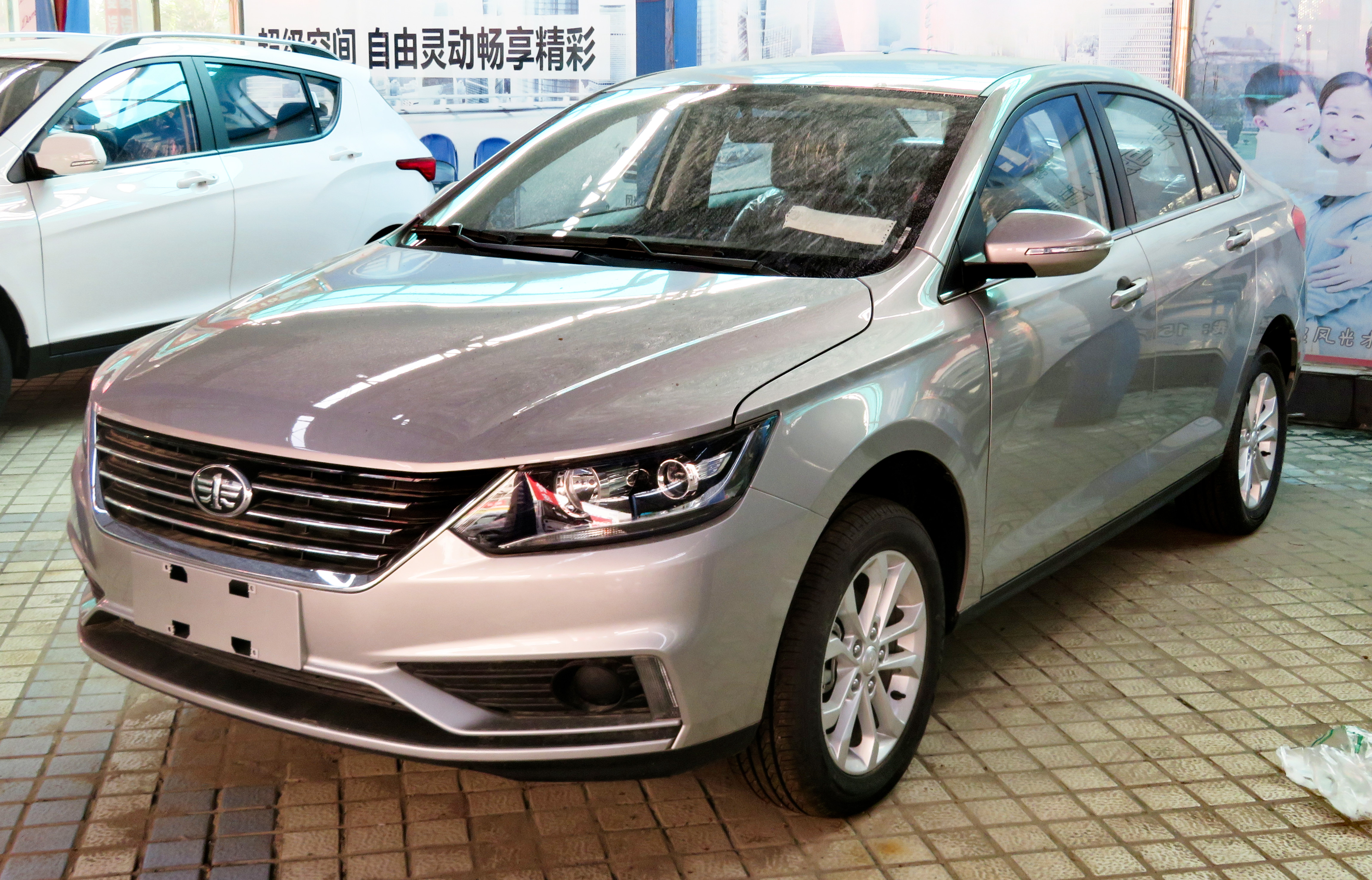

Overview
- Manufacturer: FAW Group
- Production: 2018–2019
- Designer: Filippo Perin (IDG-Italdesign)

Body and chassis
- Class: compact sedan
- Body style: 4-door sedan
- Layout: FF
- Related: Junpai CX65

Powertrain
- Engine: 1.5 L CA4GA15 I4 (petrol)
- Transmission: 5-speed manual

Dimensions
- Wheelbase: 2,610 mm (102.8 in)
- Length: 4,586 mm (180.6 in)
- Width: 1,765 mm (69.5 in)
- Height: 1,496 mm (58.9 in)
- Curb weight: 1,206 kg (2,659 lb)

The Junpai A50 (Chinese: 骏派 A50) is a compact sedan produced by Junpai, a sub-brand of FAW Group.

== History ==
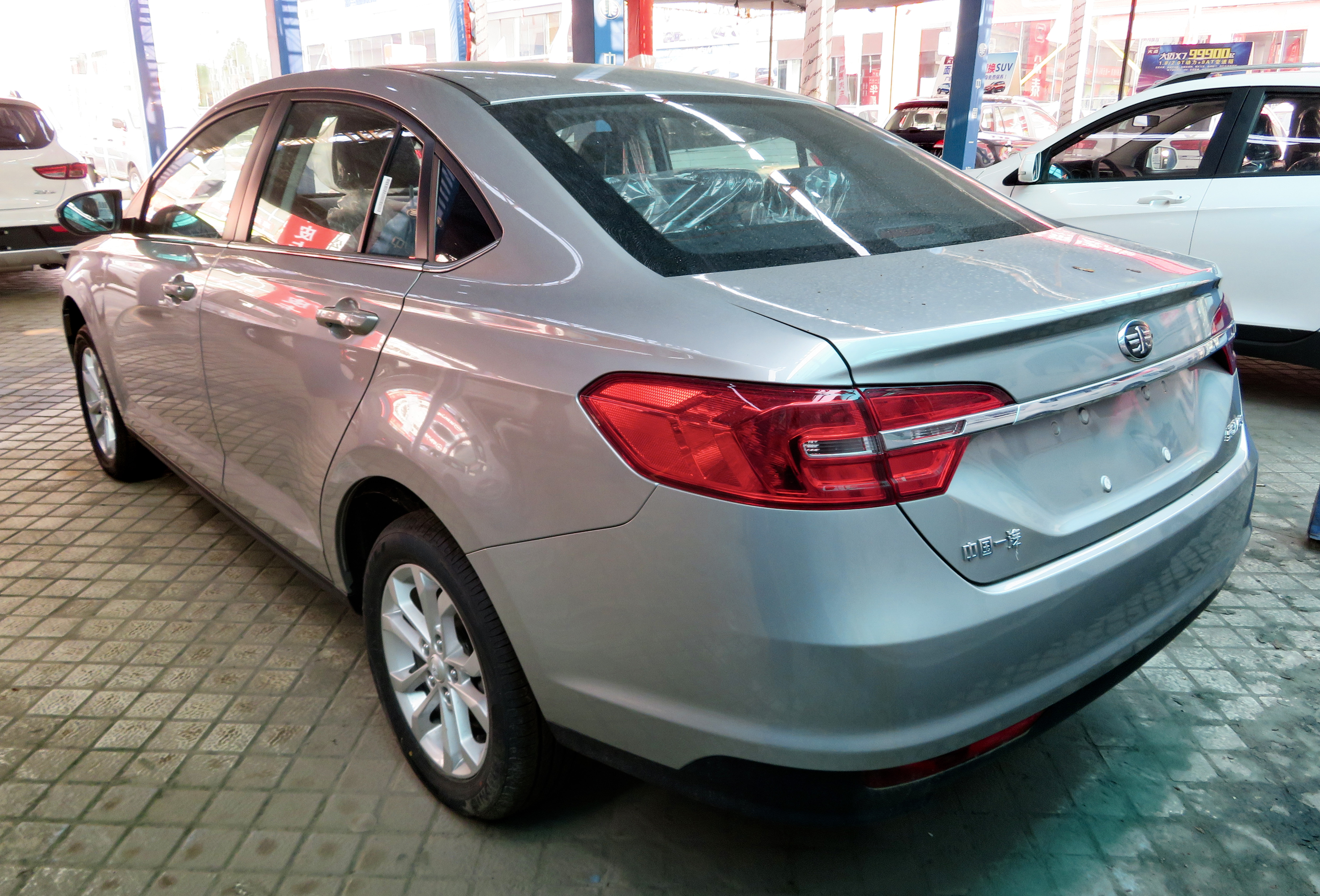
2018 FAW-Junpai A50, rear

The vehicle was unveiled at Auto Shanghai in April 2017 and is being sold exclusively in China since April 2018. The Junpai CX65 crossover estate uses the same platform.

The only engine available for the CX65 is a 1.5-litre engine.
