= Junpai CX65 =

Chinese compact crossover

Overview
- Manufacturer: FAW Group
- Production: 2018–2019
- Assembly: Tianjin, China
- Designer: Filippo Perin (IDG-Italdesign)

Body and chassis
- Class: Compact crossover SUV
- Body style: 5-door Station wagon
- Layout: FF
- Related: Junpai A50

Powertrain
- Engine: 1.5 L CA4GA5 I4 (petrol)
- Transmission: 5-speed manual

Dimensions
- Wheelbase: 2,610 mm (102.8 in)
- Length: 4,596 mm (180.9 in)
- Width: 1,785 mm (70.3 in)
- Height: 1,525 mm (60.0 in)
- Curb weight: 1,220 kg (2,690 lb)

The Junpai CX65 (Chinese: 骏派 CX65) is a compact estate car produced by Junpai, a sub-brand of FAW Group.

== History ==
The vehicle was unveiled at Auto Shanghai in April 2017 and is being sold exclusively in China since April 2018. The CX65 is essentially the crossover estate version of the Junpai A50 saloon and uses the same platform.

The only engine available for the CX65 is a 1.5-litre engine.

Junpai CX65 rear

Junpai CX65 interior
