= Jiabao V75 =

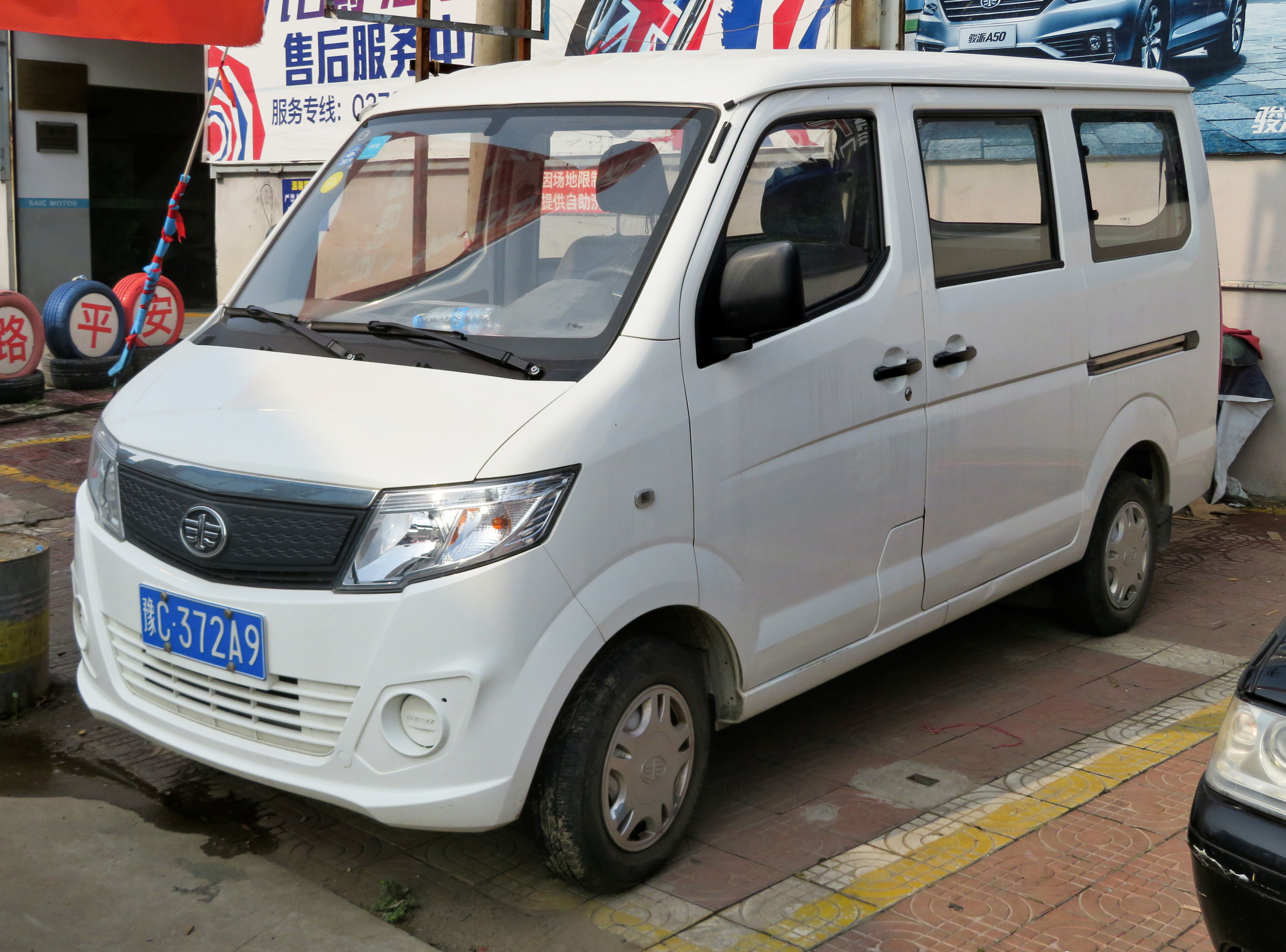

Overview
- Manufacturer: FAW Jilin (FAW Group)
- Also called: Jiabao V77; Naenara Minivan (North Korea)
- Production: 2015-present

Body and chassis
- Class: Microvan
- Body style: Microvan

Powertrain
- Engine: 1.0L I3; 1.0L I4; 1.3L I4
- Transmission: 5 speed manual

Dimensions
- Wheelbase: 2,500 mm (98.4 in)
- Length: 3,820 mm (150.4 in)(V75); 4,020 mm (158.3 in)(V77)
- Width: 1,595 mm (62.8 in)
- Height: 1,880 mm (74.0 in)

Chronology
- Predecessor: Jiabao V70

The Jiabao V75 and the Jiabao V77 are a five- to eight-seater Microvan made by FAW Jilin under the Jiabao sub-brand, with the V77 being the long version based on the V75.

== Overview ==
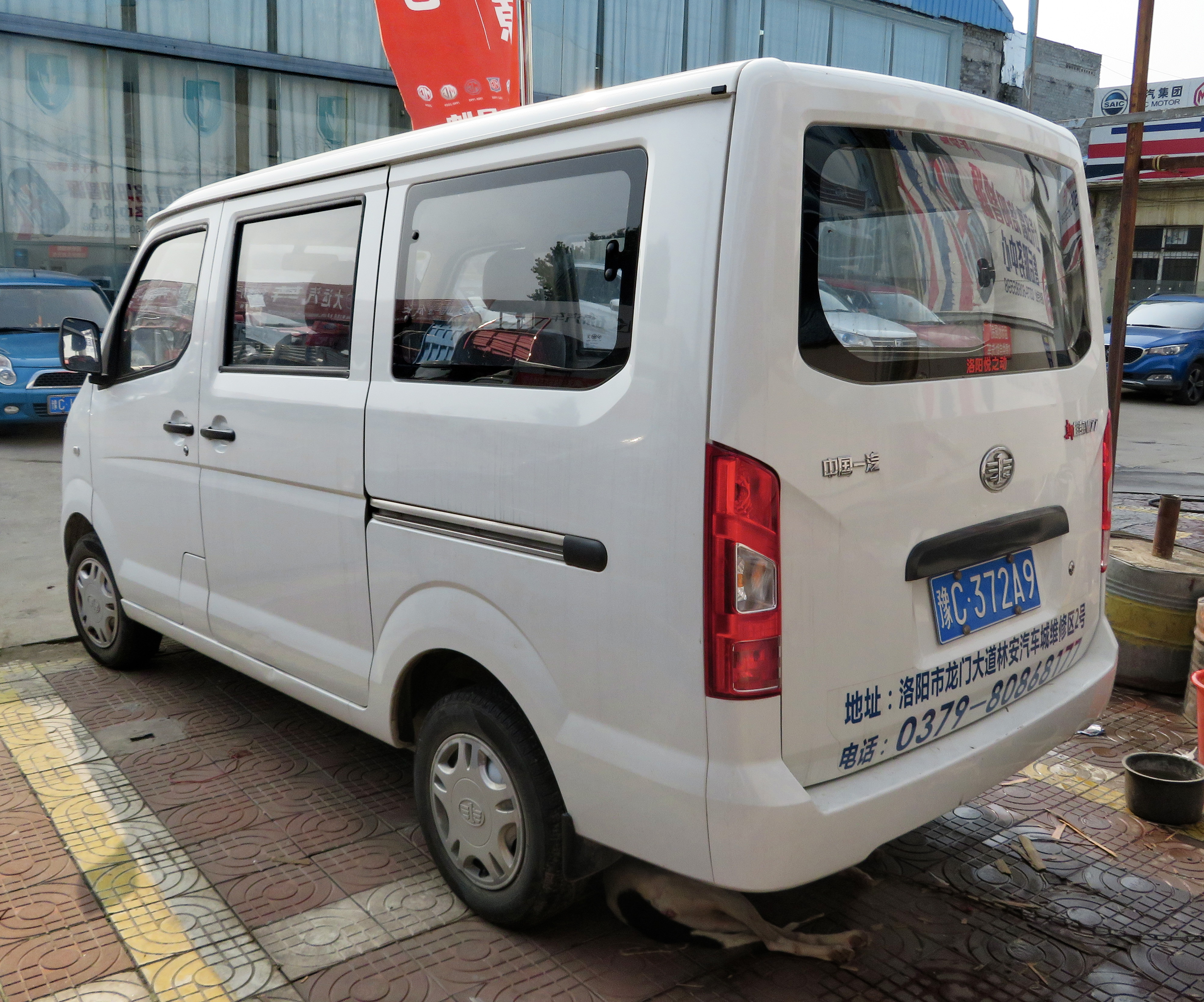
FAW Jiabao V77 rear

Launched in 2015, the Jiabao V75 is powered by a 75 hp 1.0 liter Inline-three petrol engine and the Jiabao V77 is powered by either a 75 hp 1.0 liter Inline-four petrol engine or an 88 hp 1.3 liter Inline-four petrol engine. The Jiabao V75 is priced between 28,900 yuan and 30,900 yuan and the longer Jiabao V77 priced between 30,900 yuan and 35,900 yuan. There is also a 304 mm longer version spawned called the Jiabao V55 with a single model priced at 32,900 yuan, which is powered by the same engine.
